= State agencies of Thailand =

Government agencies in Thailand

The state agencies (Thai: หน่วยงานของรัฐ) that form Thailand's public sector consist of several types of functioning bodies. While some agencies established by mandate of the constitution are independent, others are directly or indirectly answerable to the executive of the Royal Thai Government. The majority of these are government agencies, which employ the civil service as well as the military. Others include public organizations and state enterprises.

== Constitutional organizations ==
In addition to the constituents of the three branches of government, the (now-repealed) 2007 constitution provided for certain regulatory and advisory bodies. For further details, see Constitutional organizations of Thailand.

== Agencies under executive regulation ==
Government agencies under direct control of the ministries are the oldest type of state agency. They date to the establishment of the modern bureaucracy by King Chulalongkorn in the 19th century, while state enterprises were introduced in the first half of the 20th century.

By the 1990s, the bureaucratic structure of government agencies had become recognized as a source of inefficiency, and administrative reforms begun in 1997 sought to ameliorate the issue by creating new forms of state agencies with greater autonomy and operational flexibility. Thailand's state agencies now fall into the following types, as classified by the Office of the Public Sector Development Commission:

1. Government agencies
2. State enterprises
3. Public organizations
4. New state agency forms
  1. Independent administrative organizations
  2. Legal-entity funds
  3. Service delivery units

=== Government agencies ===
Government agencies (ส่วนราชการ) make up the majority of the machinery of government. They serve the basic functions of government, providing administrative public services, and follow the policies of the executive. Their operation is based on the laws and regulations of the civil service and the military.

Within the central administration, government agencies include the ministries (กระทรวง) and sub-ministries (ทบวง), and their constituent departments (กรม) or equivalent agencies. Within the provincial administration, they include the provinces and their districts. Within the local administration, they include the administrative organizations of local governments, including provincial administration organizations, municipalities and subdistrict administration organizations.

=== State enterprises ===
State enterprises (รัฐวิสาหกิจ) provide industrial and commercial public services. They exist both as purpose-established organizations (e.g., the State Railway of Thailand) and limited companies in which the government is the majority shareholder (e.g., Krung Thai Bank PLC).

=== Public organizations ===
Public organizations (องค์การมหาชน), also known as autonomous public organizations, were introduced in 1999. They provide social and cultural public services, and operate under supervision of the government, while maintaining a greater degree of administrative independence.

Most newer public organizations are established under the Public Organization Act, B.E. 2542 (1999 CE), the first being Banphaeo Hospital in 2000. Others, such as the National Science and Technology Development Agency, are established by respective acts of parliament, and are also referred to as autonomous agencies. Autonomous universities (as opposed to those that function as government agencies) also fall under this category.

=== Independent administrative organizations ===
Independent administrative organizations (หน่วยธุรการขององค์การของรัฐที่เป็นอิสระ) serve the operations of regulatory bodies (e.g., the Office of the National Broadcasting and Telecommunications Commission) or other public agencies whose independence is in the public interest (e.g., the Thai Public Broadcasting Service).

=== Legal-entity funds ===
Legal-entity funds (กองทุนที่เป็นนิติบุคคล) are established by acts of parliament to serve certain economic purposes that are of public benefit.

=== Service delivery units ===
Service delivery units (หน่วยบริการรูปแบบพิเศษ) were introduced in 2005. They are service-oriented, quasi-autonomous units operating under government departments, but have a more flexible internal management system. Their services are primarily aimed for their mother agency.

== List of state agencies of Thailand ==
=== Constitutional organizations ===
- Independent organizations
  1. Office of the Election Commission
  2. Office of the Ombudsman
  3. Office of the National Anti-Corruption Commission
  4. Office of the Auditor General
- Other organizations
  1. Office of the Attorney General
  2. Office of the National Human Rights Commission
  3. Office of the National Economic and Social Advisory Council

=== Governmental agencies ===
- Office of the Prime Minister
  - Departments:
    - Office of the Permanent Secretary
    - Government Public Relations Department
    - Office of the Consumer Protection Board
  - Departments directly reporting to the prime minister:
    - Secretariat of the Prime Minister
    - Secretariat of the Cabinet
    - National Intelligence Agency
    - Bureau of the Budget
    - Office of the National Security Council
    - Office of the Council of State
    - Office of the Civil Service Commission
    - Office of the National Economic and Social Development Council
    - Office of the Public Sector Development Commission
    - Office of the Board of Investment
- Ministry of Defence
  - Office of the Minister
  - Office of the Permanent Secretary
  - Royal Aide-de-Camp Department
  - Royal Security Command
  - Royal Thai Armed Forces
    - Royal Thai Armed Forces Headquarters
    - Royal Thai Army
    - Royal Thai Navy
    - Royal Thai Air Force
- Ministry of Finance
  - Office of the Minister
  - Office of the Permanent Secretary
  - Treasury Department
  - Comptroller General's Department
  - Customs Department
  - Excise Department
  - Revenue Department
  - State Enterprise Policy Office
  - Public Debt Management Office
  - Fiscal Policy Office
- Ministry of Foreign Affairs
  - Office of the Minister
  - Office of the Permanent Secretary
  - Department of Consular Affairs
  - Department of International Cooperation
  - Department of Protocol
  - Department of European Affairs
  - Department of Technical and Economic Cooperation
  - Department of International Economic Affairs
  - Department of Treaties and Legal Affairs
  - Department of Information
  - Department of International Organizations
  - Department of American and South Pacific Affairs
  - Department of ASEAN Affairs
  - Department of East Asian Affairs
  - Department of South Asian, Middle East and African Affairs
- Ministry of Tourism and Sports
  - Office of the Minister
  - Office of the Permanent Secretary
  - Department of Physical Education
  - Department of Tourism
- Ministry of Social Development and Human Security
  - Office of the Minister
  - Office of the Permanent Secretary
  - Department of Social Development and Welfare
  - Office of Women's Affairs and Family Development
  - National Office for Empowerment of Persons with Disabilities
  - Office of Welfare Promotion, Protection and Empowerment of Vulnerable Groups
- Ministry of Agriculture and Cooperatives
  - Office of the Minister
  - Office of the Permanent Secretary
  - Rice Department
  - Royal Irrigation Department
  - Cooperative Auditing Department
  - Department of Fisheries
  - Department of Livestock Development
  - Department of Royal Rainmaking and Agricultural Aviation
  - Land Development Department
  - Department of Agriculture
  - Department of Agricultural Extension
  - Cooperative Promotion Department
  - Queen Sirikit Department of Sericulture
  - Agricultural Land Reform Office
  - National Bureau of Agricultural Commodity and Food Standards
  - Office of Agricultural Economics
- Ministry of Transport
  - Office of the Minister
  - Office of the Permanent Secretary
  - Marine Department
  - Department of Land Transport
  - Department of Airports
  - Department of Highways
  - Department of Rural Roads
  - Office of Transport and Traffic Policy and Planning
  - Department of Rail Transport
- Ministry of Natural Resources and Environment
  - Office of the Minister
  - Office of the Permanent Secretary
  - Pollution Control Department
  - Department of Marine and Coastal Resources
  - Department of Mineral Resources
  - Department of Water Resources
  - Department of Groundwater Resources
  - Royal Forest Department
  - Department of Environment Quality Promotion
  - Department of National Parks, Wildlife and Plant Conservation
  - Office of Natural Resources and Environmental Policy and Planning
- Ministry of Digital Economy and Society
  - Office of the Minister
  - Office of the Permanent Secretary
  - Thai Meteorological Department
  - National Statistical Office
- Ministry of Energy
  - Office of the Minister
  - Office of the Permanent Secretary
  - Department of Mineral Fuels
  - Department of Energy Business
  - Department of Alternative Energy Development and Efficiency
  - Energy Policy and Planning Office
- Ministry of Commerce
  - Office of the Minister
  - Office of the Permanent Secretary
  - Department of Foreign Trade
  - Department of Internal Trade
  - Department of Trade Negotiations
  - Department of Intellectual Property
  - Department of Business Development
  - Department of International Trade Promotion
  - Trade Policy and Strategy Office
- Ministry of Interior
  - Office of the Minister
  - Office of the Permanent Secretary
  - Department of Provincial Administration
  - Community Development Department
  - Department of Lands
  - Department of Disaster Prevention and Mitigation
  - Department of Public Works and Town & Country Planning
  - Department of Local Administration
- Ministry of Justice
  - Office of the Minister
  - Departments:
    - Office of the Permanent Secretary
    - Department of Probation
    - Rights and Liberties Protection Department
    - Legal Execution Department
    - Department of Juvenile Observation and Protection
    - Department of Corrections
    - Department of Special Investigation
    - Office of Justice Affairs
    - Central Institute of Forensic Science
  - Departments reporting directly to the minister:
    - Office of the Narcotics Control Board
- Ministry of Labour
  - Office of the Minister
  - Office of the Permanent Secretary
  - Department of Employment
  - Department of Skill Development
  - Department of Labour Protection and Welfare
  - Social Security Office
- Ministry of Culture
  - Office of the Minister
  - Office of the Permanent Secretary
  - Religious Affairs Department
  - Fine Arts Department
  - Department of Cultural Promotion
  - Office of Contemporary Art and Culture
- Ministry of Higher Education, Science, Research and Innovation
  - Office of the Minister
  - Office of the Permanent Secretary
  - Department of Science Service
  - Office of Atoms for Peace
  - Office of the Higher Education Commission
  - Office of the National Research Council of Thailand
- Ministry of Education
  - Office of the Minister
  - Office of the Permanent Secretary
  - Office of the Education Council
  - Office of the Basic Education Commission
  - Office of the Vocational Education Commission
- Ministry of Public Health
  - Office of the Minister
  - Office of the Permanent Secretary
  - Department of Medical Services
  - Department of Disease Control
  - Department for Development of Thai Traditional and Alternative Medicine
  - Department of Medical Sciences
  - Department of Health Service Support
  - Department of Mental Health
  - Department of Health
  - Food and Drug Administration
- Ministry of Industry
  - Office of the Minister
  - Office of the Permanent Secretary
  - Department of Industrial Works
  - Department of Industrial Promotion
  - Department of Primary Industries and Mines
  - Office of the Cane and Sugar Board
  - Thai Industrial Standards Institute
  - Office of Industrial Economics
- Departments independent of ministries:
  - National Office of Buddhism
  - Office of the Royal Development Projects Board
  - Royal Institute
  - Royal Thai Police
  - Anti-Money Laundering Office

=== Public organizations ===
Public organizations established under the Public Organizations Act

- Community Organizations Development Institute
- Mahidol Wittayanusorn School
- Banphaeo Hospital
- Geo-Informatics and Space Technology Development Agency
- The Office for National Education Standards and Quality Assessment
- Princess Maha Chakri Sirindhorn Anthropology Centre
- The International Institute for Trade and Development
- Thailand Convention and Exhibition Bureau
- Agricultural Research Development Agency
- The Energy Fund Administration Institute
- Designated Areas for Sustainable Tourism Administration
- Software Industry Promotion Agency
- The SUPPORT Arts and Crafts International Centre of Thailand
- The Gem and Jewelry Institute of Thailand
- Office of Knowledge Management and Development
- Neighbouring Countries Economic Development Cooperation Agency
- National Institute of Educational Testing Service
- Highland Research and Development Institute
- Thailand Institute of Nuclear Technology
- Thailand Greenhouse Gas Management Organization
- Biodiversity-based Economy Development Office
- Synchrotron Light Research Institute
- Hydro and Agro Informatics Institute
- National Astronomical Research Institute of Thailand
- Defence Technology Institute
- The Golden Jubilee Museum of Agriculture Office
- The Healthcare Accreditation Institute
- Film Archive
- National Innovation Agency
- Electronic Government Agency
- Electronic Transactions Development Agency
- Thailand Institute of Occupational Safety and Health
- Thailand Professional Qualification Institute
- The Land Bank Administration Institute
- Thailand Center of Excellence for Life Sciences
- Moral Promotion Center
- Thailand Institute of Justice
- National Vaccine Institute
- Pinkanakorn Development Agency

Public organizations established under specific acts

- National Science and Technology Development Agency
- The Thailand Research Fund
- Health Systems Research Institute
- National Institute of Metrology
- Institute for the Promotion of Teaching Science and Technology
- Office of Small and Medium Enterprises Promotion
- Thai Health Promotion Foundation
- National Health Security Office
- Secretariat Office of the Teachers Council of Thailand
- Office of the Welfare Promotion Commission for Teachers and Education Personnel
- National Village and Urban Community Fund Office
- National Health Commission Office
- Thailand Arbitration Center
- National Science Technology and Innovation Policy Office
- National Institute for Emergency Medicine

=== Independent administrative organizations ===
- Bank of Thailand
- Office of the Securities and Exchange Commission
- Office of Insurance Commission
- Office of the Energy Regulatory Commission
- Thai Public Broadcasting Service
- Deposit Protection Agency
- Office of the National Broadcasting and Telecommunications Commission
- The Civil Aviation Authority of Thailand
- Office of Trade Competition Commission (OTCC)

=== Service delivery units ===
- Institute for Good Governance Promotion
- Cabinet and Royal Gazette Publishing Office

== Former state agencies ==
=== Royal agencies ===
In 2017, several government agencies were transferred to the direct control of the king, and ceased to be considered state agencies. They were the Bureau of the Royal Household (previously a ministry-independent department) and its subsidiary the Office of His Majesty's Principal Private Secretary, the Royal Aide de Camp Department and the Royal Guard Command (previously under the Ministry of Defence), and the Royal Court Security Police (previously under the Royal Thai Police).

== See also ==
- List of professional regulatory councils in Thailand - independent organizations, established by Acts of Parliament, that exercise certain legal authority but are not considered part of the state machinery
