= List of female cabinet ministers of Thailand =

The following is a list of female cabinet ministers of Thailand.

denotes the first female minister of that particular department.

Minister	Position	Year Appointed	Administration
Government
Yingluck Shinawatra	Prime Minister	2011	Herself
Paetongtarn Shinawatra	Prime Minister	2024	Herself
Suphajee Suthumpun	Deputy Prime Minister	2026	Anutin Charnvirakul
Minister of the Office of the Prime Minister
Supatra Masdit	Minister of the Office of the Prime Minister	1988	Chatichai Choonhavan
Saisuree Chutikul	Minister of the Office of the Prime Minister	1991	Anand Panyarachun
Saisuree Chutikul	Minister of the Office of the Prime Minister	1992	Anand Panyarachun
Pimpa Chandraprasong	Minister of the Office of the Prime Minister	1994	Chuan Leekpai
Supatra Masdit	Minister of the Office of the Prime Minister	1997	Chuan Leekpai
Paweena Hongsakula	Minister of the Office of the Prime Minister	1999	Chuan Leekpai
Tipawadee Meksawan	Minister of the Office of the Prime Minister	2006	Surayud Chulanont
Kritsana Sihalak	Minister of the Office of the Prime Minister	2011	Yingluck Shinawatra
Nalinee Thaveesin	Minister of the Office of the Prime Minister	2012	Yingluck Shinawatra
Sansanee Nakpong	Minister of the Office of the Prime Minister	2012	Yingluck Shinawatra
Puangpetch Chunla-iad	Minister of the Office of the Prime Minister	2023	Srettha Thavisin
Jiraporn Sindhuprai	Minister of the Office of the Prime Minister	2024	Srettha Thavisin
Supamas Isarabhakdi	Minister of the Office of the Prime Minister	2025	Anutin Charnvirakul
Minister of Agriculture and Cooperatives
Sudarat Keyuraphan	Minister of Agriculture and Cooperatives	2005	Thaksin Shinawatra
Narumon Pinyosinwat	Minister of Agriculture and Cooperatives	2024	Paetongtarn Shinawatra
Minister of Commerce
Pornthiva Saksirivethkul	Minister of Commerce	2008	Abhisit Vejjajiva
Apiradi Tantraporn	Minister of Commerce	2015	Prayut Chan-o-cha
Suphajee Suthumpun	Minister of Commerce	2025	Anutin Charnvirakul
Minister of Culture
Uraiwan Thienthong	Minister of Culture	2002	Thaksin Shinawatra
Uraiwan Thienthong	Minister of Culture	2005	Thaksin Shinawatra
Khaisri Sri-aroon	Minister of Culture	2006	Surayud Chulanont
Sukumol Kunplome	Minister of Culture	2011	Yingluck Shinawatra
Sudawan Wangsuphakijkosol	Minister of Culture	2024	Paetongtarn Shinawatra
Paetongtarn Shinawatra	Minister of Culture	2025	Herself
Sabida Thaiseth	Minister of Culture	2025	Anutin Charnvirakul
Minister of Defence
Yingluck Shinawatra	Minister of Defence	2013	Herself
Minister of Digital Economy and Society
Ranongrak Suwanchawee	Minister of Information and Communication Technology	2008	Abhisit Vejjajiva
Minister of Education
Trinuch Thienthong	Minister of Education	2021	Prayuth Chan-o-cha
Narumon Pinyosinwat	Minister of Education	2025	Paetongtarn Shinawatra; Anutin Charnvirakul
Minister of Energy
Poonpirom Liptapanlop	Minister of Energy	2008	Samak Sundaravej
Minister of Higher Education, Science, Research and Innovation
Wimolsiri Chumnanvej	Minister of State University Affairs	1976	Thanin Kraivichien
Nongyao Chaiseri	Minister of University Affairs	1997	Chavalit Yongchaiyudh
Kalaya Sophonpanich	Minister of Science and Technology	2008	Abhisit Vejjajiva
Atchaka Sibunruang	Minister of Science and Technology	2016	Prayut Chan-o-cha
Supamas Isarabhakdi	Minister of Higher Education, Science, Research and Innovation	2023	Srettha Thavisin; Paetongtarn Shinawatra
Sudawan Wangsuphakijkosol	Minister of Higher Education, Science, Research and Innovation	2025	Paetongtarn Shinawatra
Minister of Industry
Atchaka Sibunruang	Minister of Industry	2015	Prayut Chan-o-cha
Pimpatra Wichaikul	Minister of Industry	2023	Srettha Thavisin
Minister of Labor
Uraiwan Thienthong	Minister of Labor	2003	Thaksin Shinawatra
Uraiwan Thienthong	Minister of Labor	2008	Samak Sundaravej
Uraiwan Thienthong	Minister of Labor	2008	Somchai Wongsawat
Trinuch Thienthong	Minister of Labour	2025	Anutin Charnvirakul
Minister of Natural Resources and Environment
Anongwan Thepsutin	Minister of Natural Resources and Environment	2008	Samak Sundaravej
Anongwan Thepsutin	Minister of Natural Resources and Environment	2008	Somchai Wongsawat
Minister of Public Health
Sudarat Keyuraphan	Minister of Public Health	2001	Thaksin Shinawatra
Minister of Social Development and Human Security
Paweena Hongsakula	Minister of Social Development and Human Security	2013	Yingluck Shinawatra
Minister of Tourism and Sports
Kobkarn Wattanavrangkul	Minister of Tourism and Sports	2014	Prayut Chan-o-cha
Sudawan Wangsuphakijkosol	Minister of Tourism and Sports	2023	Srettha Thavisin
Minister of Transport
Lursakdi Sampatisiri	Minister of Transport	1976	Thanin Kraivichien

== See also ==
- Cabinet
- Cabinet of Thailand
- Politics of Thailand
