= Ministry of Science and Technology (Thailand) =

Kingdom of Thailand Ministry of Science and Technology
- กระทรวงวิทยาศาสตร์และเทคโนโลยี
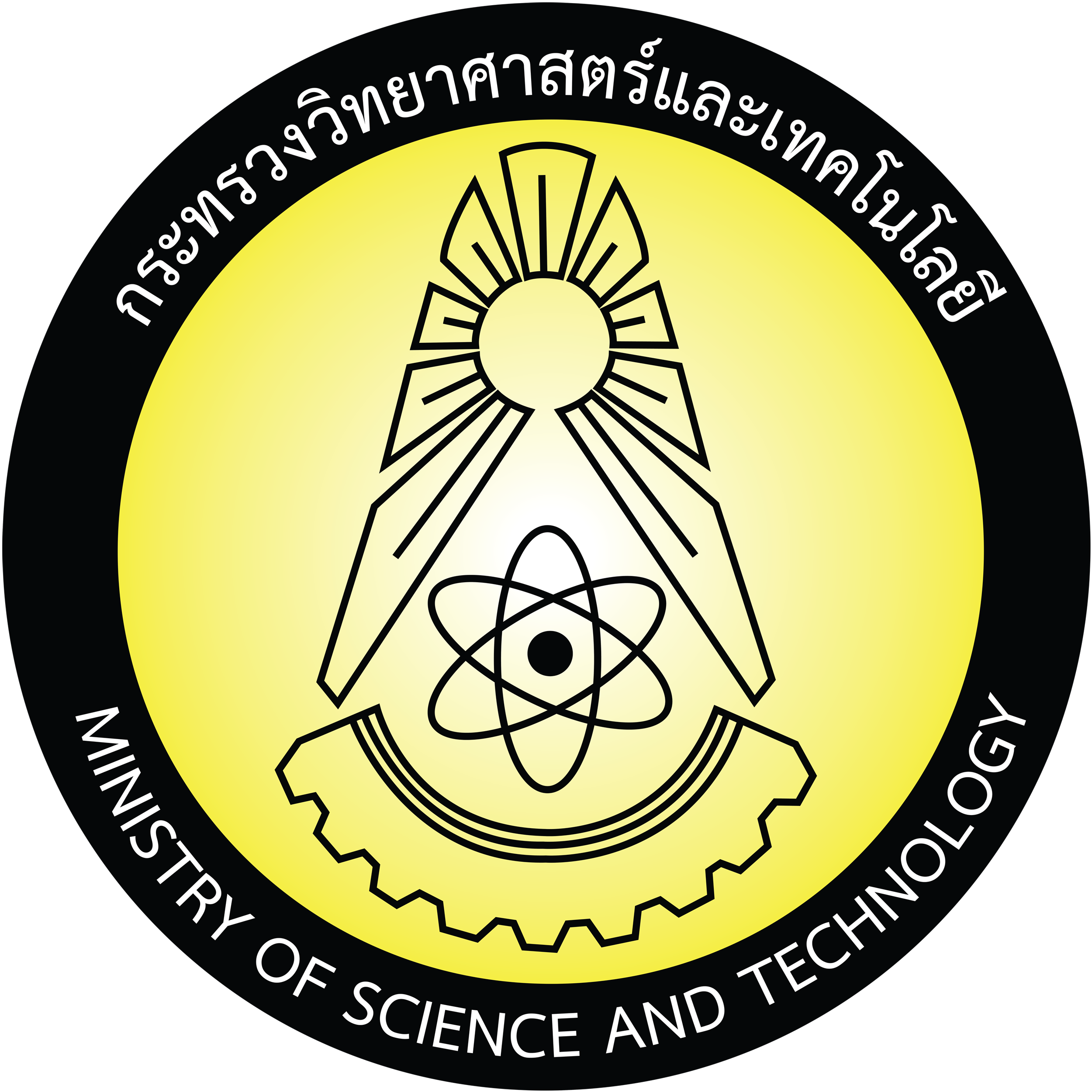

Ministry overview
- Formed: 3 October 2002
- Dissolved: 2 May 2019
- Superseding Ministry: Ministry of Higher Education, Science, Research and Innovation
- Jurisdiction: Government of Thailand
- Headquarters: Ratchathewi, Bangkok
- Annual budget: 14,885.4 million baht (FY2019)
- Website: www.most.go.th/main/en/

The Ministry of Science and Technology (Thai: กระทรวงวิทยาศาสตร์และเทคโนโลยี; RTGS: krasuang witthaya sat lae theknoloyi; Abrv: MOST), was a Thai government body responsible for the oversight of science and technology in Thailand.

== Background ==
=== Creation ===
The Ministry of Science and Technology was created by the Restructuring of Government Agencies Act of 2002, split off from the Ministry of Science, Technology and Environment, which operated from 1992 until 2002.

=== Dissolution ===
On 24 October 2018, the Thai cabinet approved the creation of the Ministry of Higher Education Science Research and Innovation. The new ministry will merge the Ministry of Science and Technology, the Office of the Higher Education Commission (OHEC), the National Research Council of Thailand, and the Thailand Research Fund. The Minister of Science and Technology, Suvit Maesincee, will head the new ministry. Its mission will be "...to develop high technology, enhancing the efficiency of the R&D and support Thailand 4.0 policy, as well as human resource development." The government has allotted a 97 billion baht budget to the new ministry in its first year, FY2019.

On 1 May 2019, the Royal Gazette published the Act of Ministries, Bureaus, and Departments Improvement (No. 19), 2562 BE, which is effective on 2 May 2019, resulting in the Ministry of Higher Education, Science, Research and Innovation establishment came up instead of the Ministry of Science and Technology that was dissolved.

== Budget ==
The ministry's budget for FY2019 is 14,885.4 million baht.

== Organization ==
=== Departments ===
- Office of the Minister
- Office of the Permanent Secretary
- Office of Atoms for Peace
- Department of Science Service (DSS)

=== Supervised public organizations ===
- National Science and Technology Development Agency
- National Institute of Metrology
- National Science Technology and Innovation Policy Office
- Geo-Informatics and Space Technology Development Agency
- National Astronomical Research Institute of Thailand
- National Innovation Agency
- Thailand Institute of Nuclear Technology
- Synchrotron Light Research Institute
- Hydro and Agro Informatics Institute
- Thailand Center of Excellence for Life Sciences

=== State enterprises ===
- Thailand Institute of Scientific and Technological Research
- National Science Museum

== See also ==
- List of government ministries of Thailand
