= Chaeng Watthana Government Complex =

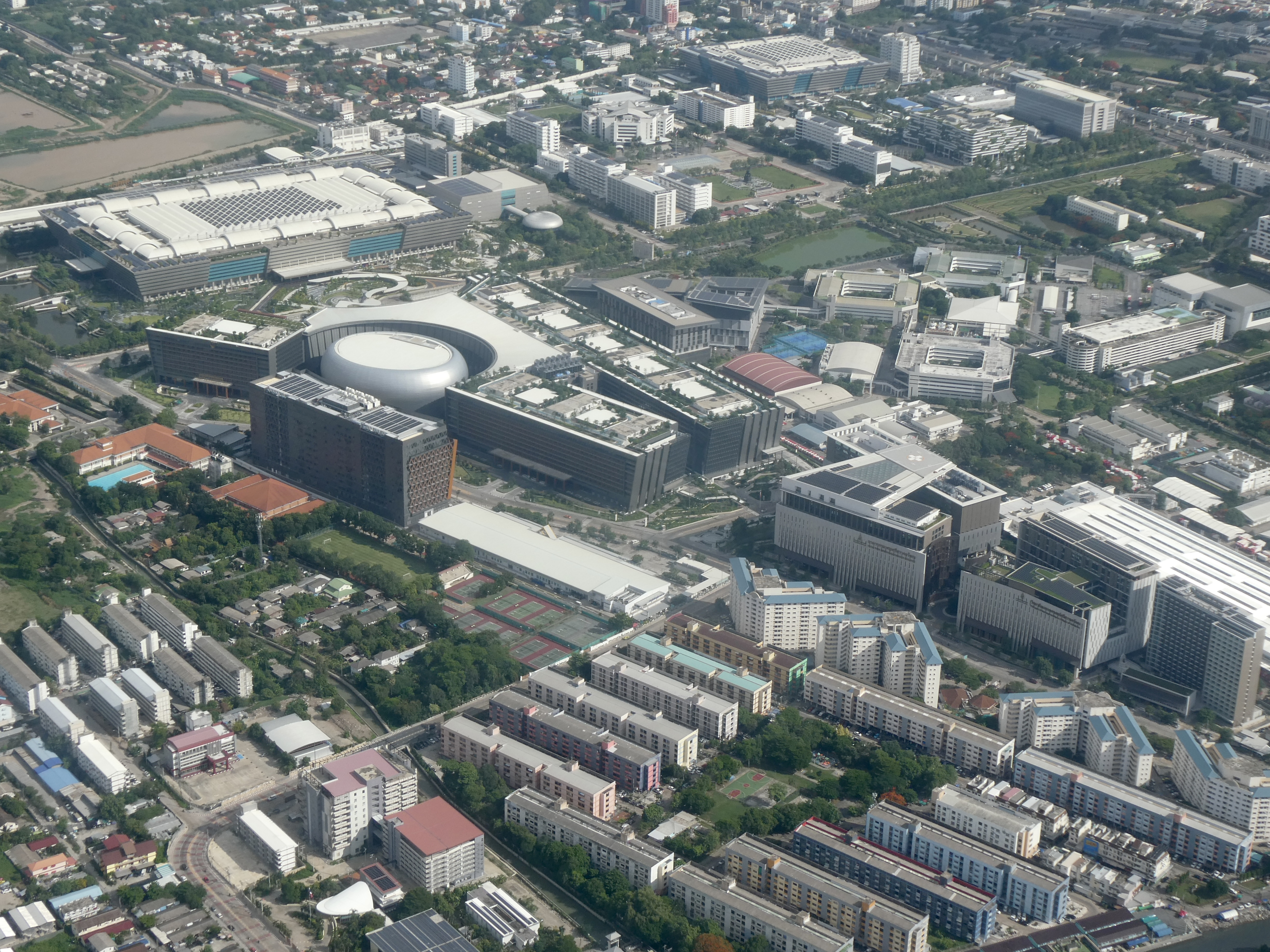

- Location within Bangkok
- Interactive map of the Chaeng Watthana Government Complex area

General information
- Architectural style: Modern
- Location: Lak Si, Bangkok, Thailand
- Coordinates: 13°53′N 100°34′E
- Construction started: 2005
- Completed: 2008
- Client: Royal Thai Government

Chaeng Watthana Government Complex (Thai: ศูนย์ราชการแจ้งวัฒนะ), or formally, the Government Complex Commemorating His Majesty the King's 80th Birthday Anniversary, 5 December, BE 2550 (2007) (Thai: ศูนย์ราชการเฉลิมพระเกียรติ 80 พรรษา 5 ธันวาคม 2550), is a complex of Thai Government buildings on Chaeng Watthana Road, Thung Song Hong Subdistrict, Lak Si District, Bangkok. The complex was built in commemoration of King Bhumibol Adulyadej's 80th birthday. The complex construction project started in 2005 under Thaksin Shinawatra's regime and was completed in 2008. Its opening ceremony was held on 17 February 2010 by Crown Prince Vajiralongkorn and Prince Dipangkorn Rasmijoti. The project cost 20,000 million baht.

The 349 rai (55.8 ha; 138 acres) of land on which the complex sits belongs to the Treasury Department, Ministry of Finance. The complex is administered by Dhanarak Asset Development (ธนารักษ์พัฒนาสินทรัพย์) or DAD, a state enterprise attached to the Treasury Department.

It was served by Government Complex MRT station since 21 November 2023.

== Structure ==
The complex is divided into three zones: Zone A (100 rai) and Zone B (197 rai) are for government buildings, and Zone C (152 rai) supports the growth of the complex itself. The governmental buildings in the complex are divided into two groups:

=== Ratchaburidirekrit Building ===
Building A (อาคารเอ), or formally, the Ratchaburidirekrit Building (อาคารราชบุรีดิเรกฤทธิ์; named for Prince Raphi Phatthanasak, Prince of Ratchaburi (1874–1920), whom some consider to be the "father of Thai law"), is in Zone A and includes the justice-related agencies:

- Administrative Courts
  - Central Administrative Court
  - Office of Administrative Courts
  - Supreme Administrative Court
- Constitutional Court
- Courts of Justice
  - Central Bankruptcy Court
  - Central Intellectual Property and International Trade Court
  - Supreme Court of Justice
  - Don Mueang Kwaeng Court
- Office of the Attorney General

=== Ratthaprasatphakdi Building ===
Building B (อาคารบี), or formally, the Ratthaprasatphakdi Building (อาคารรัฐประศาสนภักดี), is in Zone B and is includes administrative agencies:

- Independent agencies
  - Office of Election Commission of Thailand
  - Office of National Human Rights Commission
  - Office of Ombudsmen
- Ministry of Finance
  - Bangkok Regional Revenue Office 9
  - Treasury Department
- Ministry of Foreign Affairs
  - Thailand International Cooperation Agency (TICA)
  - Devawongse Varopakarn Institute of Foreign Affairs (DVIFA)
- Ministry of Digital Economy and Society
  - National Statistical Office of Thailand
  - Permanent Secretariat for Information and Communication Technology
  - Digital Economy Promotion Agency (Public Organisation)
- Ministry of Interior
  - Department of Community Development
  - Department of Land
- Ministry of Justice
  - Central Institute of Forensic Science
  - Office of Justice Affairs
- Ministry of Natural Resources and Environment
  - Biodiversity-Based Economy Development Office (Public Organisation)
  - Department of Marine and Coastal Resources
  - Thailand Greenhouse Gas Management Organisation (Public Organisation)
- Ministry of Public Health
  - Office of National Health Security
- Ministry of Science and Technology
  - Geo-Informatics and Space Technology Development Agency (Public Organisation)
- Office of the Prime Minister
  - Office of Consumer Protection Commission
  - Office of National Economic and Social Advisory Council
  - Office of the National Security Council
- Parliamentary agency
  - King Prajadhipok's Institute
- Royal Thai Police
  - Immigration Bureau
  - Office of Forensic Science Police

=== Other buildings ===
Other buildings include the "Chaeng Watthana Centara Government Complex Hotel and Convention Centre", a hotel with a convention centre called "Wayuphak Hall".
