= Streptomyces xylanilyticus =

Scientific classification
- Domain: Bacteria
- Kingdom: Bacillati
- Phylum: Actinomycetota
- Class: Actinomycetia
- Order: Streptomycetales
- Family: Streptomycetaceae
- Genus: Streptomyces
- Species: S. xylanilyticus

Binomial name
- Streptomyces xylanilyticus Moonmangmee et al. 2017

Type strain
- KCTC 39909, TISTR 2493, SR2-123

Species of bacterium

Streptomyces xylanilyticus is a bacterium species from the genus of Streptomyces which has been isolated from soil from the Sakaerat Environmental Research Station in Thailand.

== See also ==
- List of Streptomyces species
