= Gemstone irradiation =

Process to enhance a gemstone's optical properties

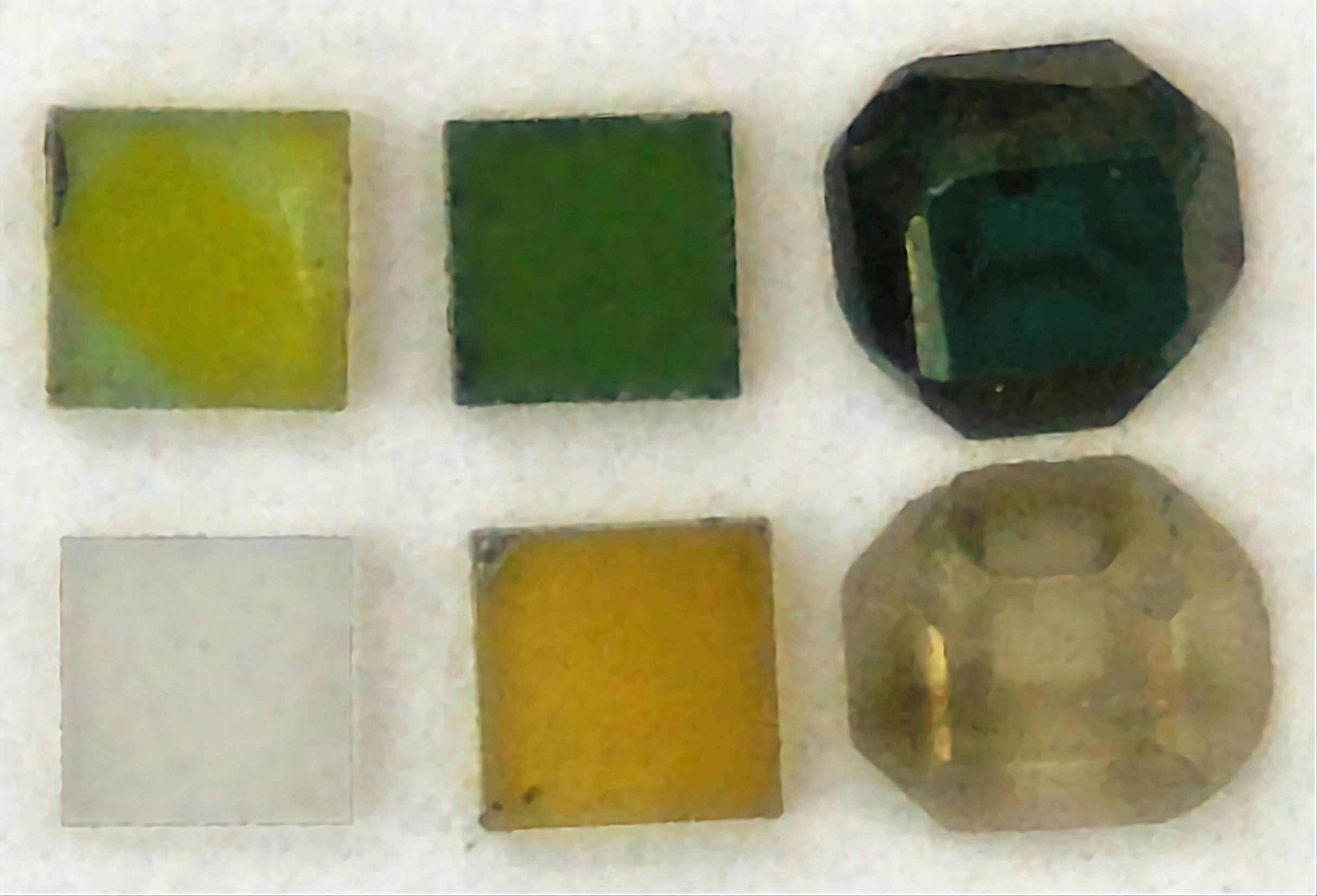
Pure diamonds, before and after irradiation treatment
- A: Initial (2×2 mm size)
- B: Irradiated by different doses of 2 MeV electrons
- C: Irradiated by different doses and then annealed at 800 °C (1,470 °F)

Gemstone irradiation is a process in which a gemstone is intentionally exposed to large amounts of ionizing radiation in order to enhance its optical properties. Large amounts of ionizing radiation can rearrange the gemstone's crystal structure, altering its optical properties. This can significantly alter the gemstone's color or lessen the visibility of its inclusions.

The process, widely practiced in jewelry industry, is done in either a particle accelerator for electron bombardment, a gamma ray facility using the radioactive isotope cobalt-60, or a nuclear reactor for neutron bombardment. Irradiation treatment has enabled the creation of gemstone colors that do not exist or are extremely rare in nature. However, the process, particularly when done in a nuclear reactor, can make the gemstones radioactive. Health risks related to the residual radioactivity in the irradiated gemstones have led to government regulations in many countries.

== Radioactivity and regulations ==
Alpha (α) radiation is stopped by a sheet of paper. Beta (β) radiation is halted by an aluminium plate. Gamma (γ) radiation is eventually absorbed as it penetrates a dense material. Neutron (n) radiation consists of free neutrons that are blocked by light elements, which slow and/or capture them.

The term irradiation broadly refers to the exposure of matter to subatomic particles or electromagnetic radiation across the entire spectrum, which includes—in order of increasing frequency and decreasing wavelength—infrared, visible light, ultraviolet, X-rays, and gamma rays. Certain natural gemstone colors, such as blue-to-green colors in diamonds or red colors in zircon, are caused by exposure to natural radiation in the earth, which is usually alpha or beta particles. The limited penetrating ability of these particles result in partial coloring of the gemstone's surface. Only high-energy radiation such as gamma rays or neutrons can produce fully saturated body colors, and the sources of these types of radiation are rare in nature, which necessitates the artificial treatment in jewelry industry. The process, particularly when done in a nuclear reactor for neutron bombardment, can make gemstones radioactive. (Note: Generally speaking, either photons having energy of at least 10 MeV or neutrons are needed to induce significant radioactivity in a material.) Neutrons penetrate the gemstones easily and may cause visually pleasing uniform coloration, but also penetrate into the atomic nucleus and cause the excited nucleus to decay, thereby inducing radioactivity. So neutron-treated gemstones are set aside afterward for a couple of months to several years to allow the residual radioactivity to decay, until they reach a safe level of less than 1 nanocurie per gram (37 Bq/g) to 2.7 nanocuries per gram (100 Bq/g) depending on the country. (Note: As of 1987, most developed countries regarded 2 nanocuries per gram (74 Bq/g) as safe to release to the public while the U.S. federal release limits for most nuclides were 1 nanocurie per gram (37 Bq/g) or less, and that of the United Kingdom was 2.7 nanocuries per gram (100 Bq/g). As of 2022, the release limit of the European Union is 2.7 nanocuries per gram (100 Bq/g).)

The first documented artificially irradiated gemstone was created by English chemist William Crookes in 1905 by burying a colorless diamond in powdered radium bromide. After having been kept there for 16 months, the diamond became olive green. This method produces a dangerous degree of long-term radioactive contamination and is no longer in use. Some of these radium-treated diamonds—which are still occasionally put on sale and can be detected by particle detectors such as the Geiger counter, the scintillation counter, or the semiconductor detector—are so high in radiation emission that they may darken photographic film in minutes.

The concerns for possible health risks related to the residual radioactivity of the irradiated gemstones led to government regulations in many countries. In the United States, the Nuclear Regulatory Commission (NRC) has set strict limits on the allowable levels of residual radioactivity before an irradiated gemstone can be distributed in the country. All neutron- or electron beam-irradiated gemstones must be tested by an NRC-licensee prior to release for sales; however, when treated in a cobalt-60 gamma ray facility, gemstones do not become radioactive and thus are not under NRC authority. In India, the Board of Radiation and Isotope Technology (BRIT), the industrial unit of the Department of Atomic Energy, conducts the process for private sectors. In Thailand, the Office of Atoms for Peace (OAP) did the same, irradiating 413 kilograms (911 lb) of gemstones from 1993 to 2003, until the Thailand Institute of Nuclear Technology was established in 2006 and housed the Gem Irradiation Center to provide the service.

== Materials and results ==
Effects of irradiation on various gemstone materials
Material	Starting color	Ending color
Amber	Light yellow	Orangey red, orangey yellow
Beryl	Colorless	Yellow
Beryl	Blue	Green
Beryl	Colorless to pale pink (Maxixe-type)	Deep blue
Diamond	Colorless or yellow to brown	Green to blue
Fluorite	Colorless	Various
Pearl	Light colors	Brown, gray to black or gray-blue
Quartz	Colorless to yellow or pale green	Amethyst, brown, rose, "smoky" (light gray)
Sapphire	Pink with blue tint	Tint removed
Topaz	Yellow to orange	Intensify colors
Topaz	Colorless to pale blue	Brown, dark blue, green, sky blue
Tourmaline	Colorless to pale colors	Brown, green-red (bicolor), intense pink, pink, red, yellowish orange
Tourmaline	Pink	Intense pink, orangey pink
Tourmaline	Blue	Purple
Zircon	Colorless	Brown to red

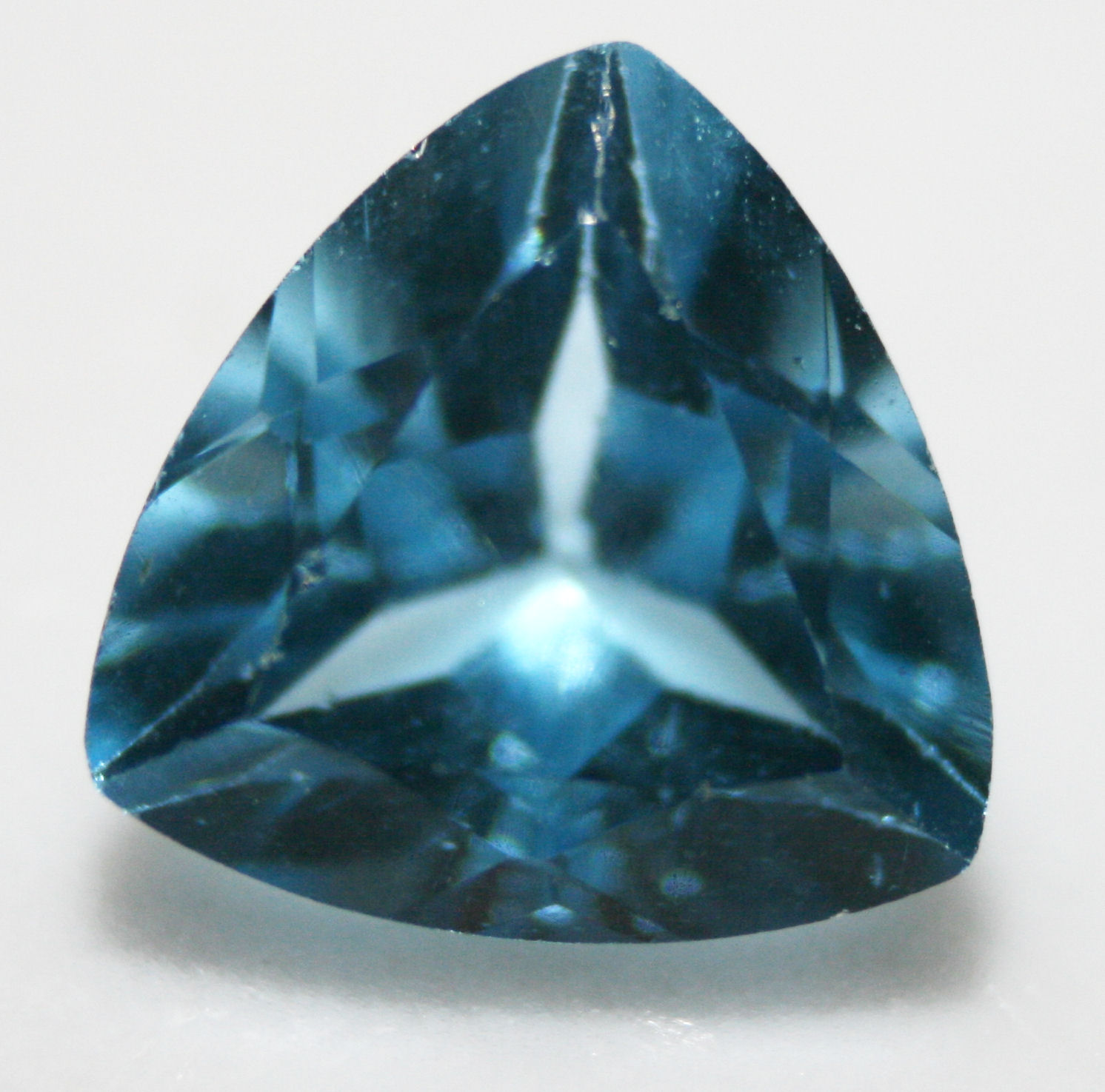
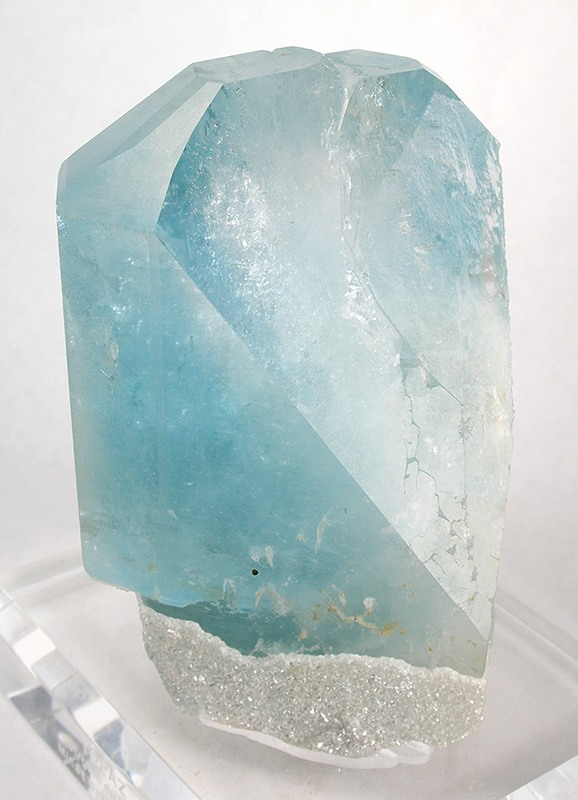
London Blue (left), one of the neutron-bombarded varieties of topaz, compared to a natural blue topaz (right). Intensely blue topaz does not exist in nature and is caused by artificial irradiation.

The most commonly irradiated gemstone is topaz, which usually becomes blue after the process. Intensely blue topaz does not exist in nature and is caused by artificial irradiation. According to the American Gem Trade Association, approximately 30 million carats (6,000 kg or 13,000 lb) of topaz are irradiated every year globally, 40 percent of which were done in the United States as of 1988. Dark-blue varieties of topaz, including American Super Blue and London Blue, are caused by neutron bombardment, while lighter sky-blue ones are often caused by electron bombardment. Swiss Blue, subtly lighter than the US variety, is caused by a combination of the two methods.

Diamonds are mainly irradiated to become blue-green or green, although other colors are possible. When light-to-medium-yellow diamonds are treated with gamma rays they may become green; with a high-energy electron beam, blue. The difference in results may be caused by local heating of the stones, which occurs when the latter method is used.

Colorless beryls, also called goshenite, become pure yellow when irradiated, which are called golden beryl or heliodor. Quartz crystals turn "smoky" or light gray upon irradiation if they contain an aluminum impurity, or amethyst if small amounts of iron are present in them; either of the results can be obtained from natural radiation as well.

Pearls are irradiated to produce gray blue or gray-to-black colors. Methods of using a cobalt-60 gamma ray facility to darken white Akoya pearls were patented in the early-1960s. But the gamma ray treatment does not alter the color of the pearl's nacre, therefore is not effective if the pearl has a thick or non-transparent nacre. Most black pearls available in markets prior to the late-1970s had been either irradiated or dyed.

=== Uniformity of coloration ===
Gemstones that have been subjected to artificial irradiation generally show no visible evidence of the process, although some diamonds irradiated in an electron beam may show color concentrations around the culet or along the keel line.

=== Color stability ===
In some cases, the new colors induced by artificial irradiation may fade rapidly when exposed to light or gentle heat, so some laboratories submit them to a "fade test" to determine color stability. Sometimes colorless or pink beryls become deep blue upon irradiation, which are called Maxixe-type beryl. However, the color easily fades when exposed to heat or light, so it has no practical jewelry application.
