= Hong Thai =

Thai traditional herbal inhaler

Hong Thai (Thai: หงส์ไทย; lit. 'Thai Swan') is a Thai brand of traditional herbal inhaler produced by Thai Herbal Hong Thai Co., Ltd. The brand was the subject of media coverage in 2023 after Lisa of Blackpink was photographed carrying one of its inhalers.

== History ==
Hong Thai was founded by Theerapong Rabueatham. He began his career as a street vendor in the Talat Phlu area of Bangkok in 1987. He developed the product from a traditional formula discovered in a newspaper; the business later expanded beyond local sales and entered overseas markets.

== International recognition ==
In April 2023, Lisa of Blackpink was photographed carrying a Hong Thai inhaler. Thai media reported that the product subsequently sold out at stores across Thailand.

In September 2024, the brand was identified by the Thai Ministry of Commerce as a "soft power" product, part of a national strategy to promote Thai herbal goods in the global market.

== Quality control and safety ==
In 2024 and 2025, regulators in Singapore and the United Arab Emirates recalled specific batches of Hong Thai inhalers due to microbial contamination. The manufacturer later announced sterilization measures in cooperation with the Thailand Institute of Nuclear Technology (TINT)
