= THEOS-2 =

Thai Earth observation satellite launched in 2023

- Mission type: Earth Observation
- Operator: GISTDA
- COSPAR ID: 2023-155A
- SATCAT no.: 58016

Spacecraft properties
- Manufacturer: Airbus Defence and Space

Start of mission
- Launch date: 9 October 2023
- Rocket: Vega
- Launch site: Guiana Space Centre
- Contractor: Arianespace

Orbital parameters
- Reference system: Geocentric
- Regime: Sun-synchronous, LEO
- Eccentricity: ≈0

THEOS-2 (Thailand Earth Observation System-2), is a Thai Earth observation satellite capable of observing Earth's surface with a resolution of up to 50cm, and covering about 74,000 square kilometers per day. It is the second generation of the Thai Geo-Informatics and Space Technology Development Agency earth observation system, following the THEOS satellite launched in 2008.

== Development and mission ==
THEOS-2 was constructed by Airbus on an AstroBus-S satellite bus in conjunction with Thai engineers. System testing occurred in Thailand at the Satellite Assembly and Testing Center in Si Racha district, Chonburi province. In March 2017, the Thai government announced ฿7.8 million in funding for the development and launch of THEOS-2.

THEOS-2 was launched by a Vega rocket from Guiana Space Centre in French Guiana on 9 October 2023. Its planned lifespan is 5 years.

Following THEOS-2, Thailand intends to build the THEOS-3 satellite completely domestically as its replacement.

== Specifications ==
The satellite's dimensions are 1.2 meters by 1.2 meters by 1.8 meters, and its weight (including fuel) is approximately 455 kilograms. Its primary payload is an imaging system with a resolution of 2 meters in multispectral imaging mode and 50 centimeters in panchromatic imaging mode.

== THEOS-2A ==
As part of the THEOS-2 project, a small satellite known as THEOS-2 SmallSat or THEOS-2A, constructed by Surrey Satellite Technology, was planned to be part of the GISTDA's Development Survey Satellite System Project (โครงการระบบดาวเทียมสำรวจเพื่อการพัฒนา) together with THEOS-2. THEOS-2A was lost in the PSLV-C62 launch accident on 12 January 2026.
