= Ministry of Science, Technology and Environment =

Ministry of Science, Technology and Environment may refer to:

- Ministry of Science, Technology and Environment (Cuba)
- Ministry of Science, Technology and Environment (Malaysia)
- Ministry of Science, Technology and Environment (Nepal)
- Ministry of Science, Technology and Environment (Thailand)
