= Freedom of religion in Thailand =

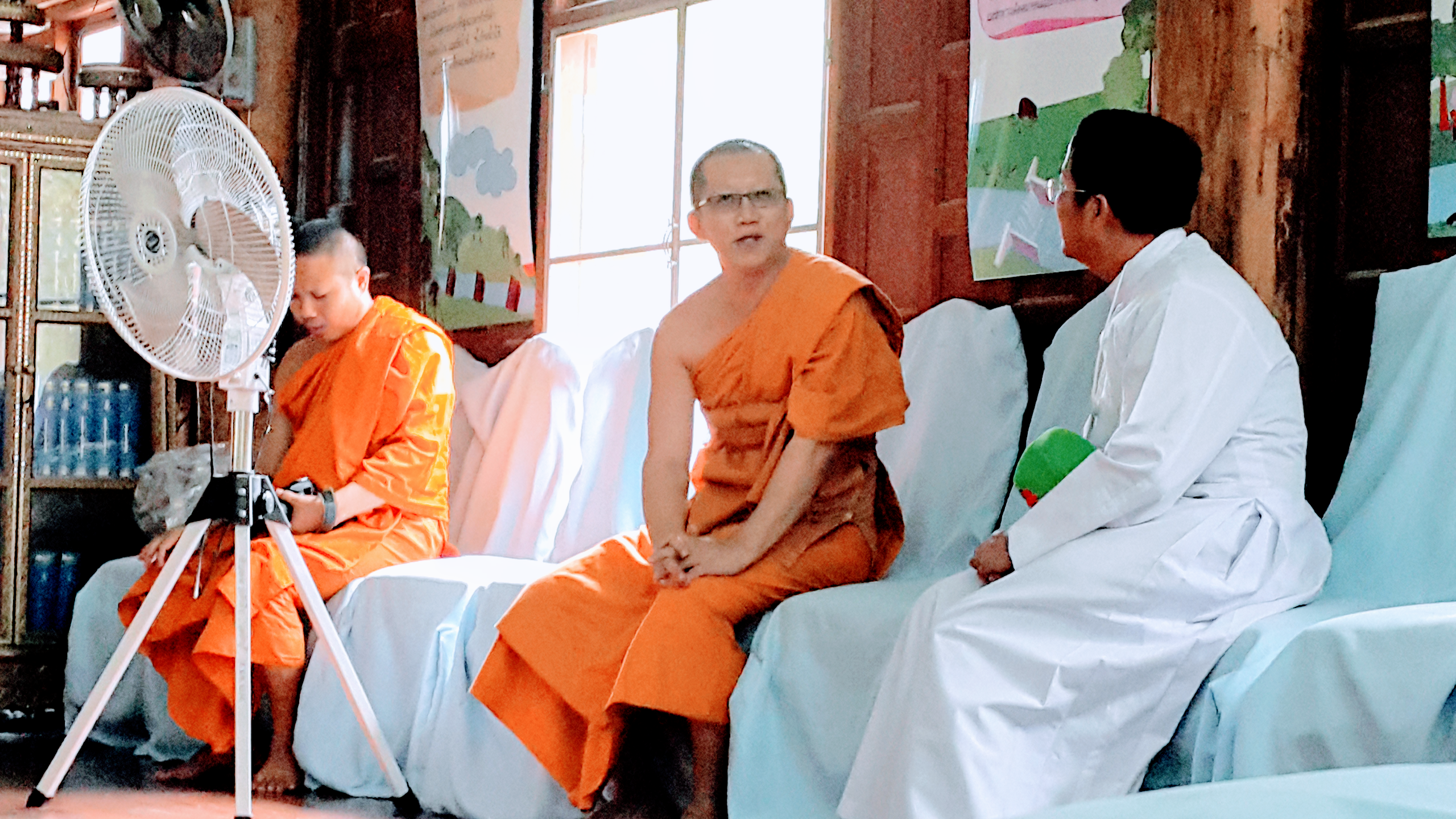
A Buddhist monk talking to a Catholic priest in a temple in Kanchanaburi

According to the 2018 census, Buddhism is the largest religion in Thailand, practiced by over 94% of the population; Islam makes up 5% of the population. The Thai government officially recognizes five religions: Buddhism, Islam, Hinduism, Sikhism, and Christianity.

Due to violence in the south of the country, in 2023, the country was scored 3 out of 4 for religious freedom.

This article is informed by the US State Dept 2007 report. Later reports are available.

In Thailand, the freedom of religion is protected through statutory means. The law provides for freedom of religion, and the government generally has respected this right in practice; however, it does not register new religious groups that have not been accepted into one of the existing religious governing bodies on doctrinal or other grounds. In practice, unregistered religious organizations have operated freely, and the government's practice of not recognizing any new religious groups has not restricted the activities of unregistered religious groups. The government officially limits the number of foreign missionaries that may work in the country, although unregistered missionaries have been present in large numbers and have been allowed to live and work freely. There have been no reports of societal abuses or discrimination based on religious belief or practice; however, in the far southern border provinces, continued separatist violence has resulted in increasingly tense relations between the Buddhist and Muslim communities.

== Religious demography ==
The country has an area of 198,000 square miles (510,000 km^{2}) and population of 70 million. According to the government's National Statistics Office, approximately 94.8 percent of the population is Buddhist and 4.5 percent is Muslim; however, non-governmental organizations, academics, and religious groups estimated that approximately 85 to 90 percent of the population is Theravada Buddhist and up to 10 percent of the population is Muslim. Christians, mainly Catholics, represent 0.7% of the population. There are small animist, Confucian, Hindu, Jewish, Sikh, and Taoist populations. According to the Ministry of Culture's Religious Affairs Department (RAD), the numbers of atheists or persons who do not profess a religious faith make up less than one percent of the population.

The dominant religion is Theravada Buddhism. The Buddhist clergy, or Sangha, consists of two main schools, which are governed by the same ecclesiastical hierarchy. Monks belonging to the older Mahanikaya school far outnumber those of the Dhammayuttika school, an order that grew out of a 19th-century reform movement led by King Mongkut (Rama IV).

Islam is the dominant religion in four of the five southernmost provinces, which border Malaysia. The majority of Muslims are ethnic Malay, but the Muslim population encompass groups of diverse ethnic and national origin, including descendants of immigrants from South Asia, China, Cambodia, and Indonesia. The RAD reported that there are 3,567 registered mosques in 64 provinces, of which 2,289 are located in the 5 southernmost provinces. According to the RAD, 99 percent of these mosques are associated with the Sunni branch of Islam. Shi'a mosques make up the remaining 1 percent.

According to RAD statistics, there are an estimated 351,987 Christians in the country, constituting 0.5 percent of the population. There are several Protestant denominations, and most belong to one of four umbrella organizations. The oldest of these groupings, the Church of Christ in Thailand, was formed in the mid-1930s. The largest is the Evangelical Fellowship of Thailand. Baptists and Seventh-day Adventists are recognized by authorities as separate Protestant denominations and are organized under similar umbrella groups.

According to the most recent government survey in 2002, there are 9 recognized tribal groups (chao khao), comprising approximately 920,000 persons. Syncretistic practices drawn from Buddhism, Christianity, Taoism, and spirit worship are common among the tribal groups. The Sikh Council of Thailand estimates the Sikh community to have a population of approximately 70,000 persons, most of whom reside in Bangkok, Chiang Mai, Nakhon Ratchasima, Pattaya, Ko Samui, and Phuket. There are 18 Sikh temples in the country. According to RAD statistics and local Hindu organizations, there are an estimated 95,000 Hindus in the country.

The ethnic Chinese minority (Sino-Thai) has retained some popular religious traditions from China, including adherence to popular Taoist beliefs. Members of the Mien hill tribe follow a form of Taoism.

Mahayana Buddhism is practiced primarily by small groups of Chinese and Vietnamese immigrants. There are more than 675 Chinese and Vietnamese Mahayana Buddhist shrines and temples throughout the country.

Religious groups proselytize freely. Monks working as Buddhist missionaries (Dhammaduta) have been active since the end of World War II, particularly in border areas among the country's tribal populations. According to the National Buddhism Bureau, as of December 2006 there are 6,458 Dhammaduta working in the country. In addition, the government sponsored the international travel of another 1,414 Buddhist monks sent by their temples to disseminate religious information. Muslim organizations reported having small numbers of citizens working as missionaries in the country and abroad. Christian organizations reported much larger numbers of missionaries, both foreign and Thai, operating in the country.

== Status of religious freedom ==
=== Legal and policy framework ===
The law provides for freedom of religion, and the government generally respected this right in practice; however, it restricted the activities of some groups. On September 19, 2006, in a bloodless coup d'état, the military overthrew the government and repealed the constitution. On October 1, 2006, the military coup leaders promulgated an interim constitution, established an interim government, and convened a Constitutional Drafting Assembly to draft a new constitution. Legal experts maintained that the interim constitution incorporates by reference many of the civil rights and protections contained in the 1997 constitution. The repealed 1997 constitution required that the monarch be a Buddhist. This provision was retained in the April 2007 first draft of the country's next constitution. The state religion in effect is Theravada Buddhism; however, it is not officially designated as such. During the reporting period, some Buddhist organizations called for the designation of Buddhism as the state religion in the new draft constitution, but as of June 2007 such a provision had not been included.

The repealed 1997 constitution stated that discrimination against a person on the grounds of "a difference in religious belief" shall not be permitted. The September 2006 interim constitution appears to retain by reference this prohibition against discrimination, and it has been included explicitly in the April 2007 draft constitution. There was no significant pattern of religious discrimination during the period covered by this report.

The repealed 1997 constitution and the interim constitution by reference provided for a large measure of freedom of speech; however, laws prohibiting speech likely to insult Buddhism remain in place. The 1962 Sangha Act specifically prohibits the defamation or insult of Buddhism and the Buddhist clergy. Violators of the law could face up to 1 year imprisonment or fines of up to $5,800 (188,000 baht). The Penal Code prohibits the insult or disturbance of religious places or services of all officially recognized religions.

The government plays an active role in religious affairs. The RAD, which is subordinate to the Ministry of Culture, registers religious organizations. Under the provisions of the Religious Organizations Act, the RAD recognizes a new religion if a national census shows that it has at least 5,000 adherents, has a uniquely recognizable theology, and is not politically active. A religious organization must be accepted into an officially recognized ecclesiastical group before the RAD will grant registration. During the reporting period, there were five recognized religious groups: Buddhists, Muslims, Brahmin-Hindus, Sikhs, and Catholics. Four Protestant groups are recognized as subgroups of the Catholics. Government registration confers some benefits, including access to state subsidies, tax-exempt status, and preferential allocation of resident visas for organization officials. However, since 1984 the government has not recognized any new religious groups. In practice, unregistered religious organizations operated freely, and the government's practice of not recognizing any new religious groups did not restrict the activities of unregistered religious groups.

The repealed 1997 constitution required the government "to patronize and protect Buddhism and other religions." The September 2006 interim constitution appears to retain by reference this protection for religion, and it has been included explicitly in the April 2007 draft constitution. The state subsidizes activities of the three largest religious communities (Buddhist, Islamic, and Christian). The government allocated approximately $92.6 million (3 billion baht) during fiscal year 2007 to support the National Buddhism Bureau, which was established in 2002 as an independent state agency. The office oversees the Buddhist clergy and approved the curricula of Buddhist teachings for all Buddhist temples of educational institutions. In addition, the bureau promotes the Buddhist faith by sponsoring educational and public relations materials on the faith and practice in daily life.

For fiscal year 2006 the government, through the RAD, budgeted $950,000 (30.8 million baht) for Islamic organizations and $88,000 (2.85 million baht) for Christian, Brahman-Hindu, and Sikh organizations.

The budgets for Buddhist and Muslim organizations included funds to support Buddhist and Muslim institutes of higher education, fund religious education programs in public and private schools, provide daily allowances for monks and Muslim clerics who hold administrative and senior ecclesiastical posts, and subsidize travel and health care for monks and Muslim clerics. Also included is an annual budget for the renovation and repair of Buddhist temples and Muslim mosques, the maintenance of historic Buddhist sites, and the daily upkeep of the central mosque in Pattani, Thailand. Other registered religious groups can request government support for renovation and repair work but do not receive a regular budget to maintain religious buildings, nor do they receive government assistance to support their clergy. In 2007 the government budgeted approximately $580,000 (18.8 million baht) for the restoration of religious buildings of religious groups, of which $362,000 (11.7 million baht) was allotted for the Muslim community, $145,000 (4.7 million baht) for the Christian, Brahmin-Hindu, and Sikh communities, and $73,000 (2.4 million baht) for special projects of all communities. Private donations to registered religious organizations are tax deductible.

Religious instruction is required in public schools at both the primary and secondary education levels. The Ministry of Education has formulated a course called "Social, Religion, and Culture Studies," which students in each grade study for one to two hours each week. The course contains information about all of the recognized religions in the country. Students who wish to pursue in-depth studies of other religions or of their belief may study at the religious schools and can transfer credits to the public school. Schools, working in conjunction with their local school administrative board, are authorized to arrange additional religious studies courses. The Sangha Supreme Council and the Central Islamic Committee of Thailand have created special curricula for Buddhist and Islamic studies.

There are a variety of Islamic education opportunities for children. Tadika is an after-school religious course for children in grades one through six, which is under the supervision of the RAD, except for the three southern provinces of Narathiwat, Yala, and Pattani, where the courses were supervised by the Ministry of Education. The education generally takes place in a mosque. According to government statistics, as of April 2007 there were 1,618 registered Islamic Religious and Moral Education centers teaching Tadika in the 3 southern provinces, with 170,989 students and 5,749 teachers. In the remainder of the country, the RAD registered 994 centers, with 110,783 students and 2,693 teachers. For secondary school children, the Ministry of Education allows two separate curricula for private Islamic studies schools. The first type teaches only Islamic religious courses. As of April 2007 there were 107 schools with 2,044 students and 277 teachers using this curriculum in the 3 southern provinces. The Government registers but does not certify these schools, and students from these schools cannot continue to any higher education within the country. The number of this type of school declined because students opted to attend schools that afford alternatives for higher education. The second curriculum teaches both Islamic religious courses and traditional state education coursework. As of April 2007, 144 schools with 72,618 students used this curriculum in the 3 southern provinces. The government recognizes these private schools, and graduating students can continue to higher education within the country. A third type of Islamic education available, mostly in the southern part of the country, is that provided by traditional, privately operated religious day schools, known as pondok schools. As of April 2007, there were 328 registered pondok schools primarily in Pattani, Yala, and Narathiwat Provinces. Previously, these religious schools were not required to register with the Government and received no government oversight or funding. The registration effort began in April 2004 following an attack on a military post and arms depot in Narathiwat in January 2004. Government investigations into that incident led the authorities to pursue suspects associated with pondok schools. The total number of pondoks is still unknown. Sources believed that there could be as many as 1,000.

The government actively sponsors interfaith dialogue. The abrogated 1997 constitution required the state to "promote good understanding and harmony among followers of all religions." This language was included in the April 2007 draft constitution. The government funds regular meetings and public education programs. These programs included the RAD annual interfaith meeting for representatives and members of all religious groups certified by RAD. The programs also included monthly meetings of the 17 member Subcommittee on Religious Relations, located within the Prime Minister's National Identity Promotion Office (the subcommittee is composed of one representative from the Buddhist, Muslim, Roman Catholic, Hindu, and Sikh communities in addition to civil servants from several government agencies). The RAD held an interfaith event focusing on religious youth from June 26–28 in Chonburi Province, just outside Bangkok. Approximately 250 youth from across the country attended. In July 2006 the RAD organized another interfaith convention in Surat Thani, which had approximately 1,000 participants. The RAD sponsored a public relations campaign promoting interreligious understanding and harmony, including prime-time television announcements. However, a continuing separatist insurgency by militant ethnic Malay Muslims in the southernmost provinces led to concerns that the violence may be contributing to increased tensions between the local Buddhist and Muslim communities.

=== Restrictions on religious freedom ===
During the reporting period, the Falun Gong abandoned a petition challenging the government's September 2005 denial of their application to register as an association with the Office of the National Cultural Commission. The petition was abandoned after no action had been announced on a second petition submitted to the police department to print and distribute a weekly Falun Gong magazine. The group was able to print and distribute religious materials both in Thai and Chinese on a small, informal basis for free distribution. Falun Gong maintained a website that advertises daily gatherings in Bangkok.

The government does not recognize religious groups other than the five existing groupings; however, unregistered religious organizations operated freely.

Although unregistered missionaries were present in large numbers, the number of foreign missionaries registered with the government is limited to a quota that originally was established by the RAD in 1982. The quota is divided along both religious and denominational lines. There were close to 1,500 registered foreign missionaries in the country, most of them Christian. During the period covered by this report, the government increased by 10 slots its quota for Christian missionaries. In addition to these formal quotas, far more missionaries, while not registered, were able to live and work in the country without government interference. While registration conferred some benefits, such as longer terms for visa stays, being unregistered was not a significant barrier to foreign missionary activity. Many foreign missionaries entered the country using tourist visas and proselytized or disseminated religious literature without the acknowledgment of the RAD. There were no reports that foreign missionaries were deported or harassed for working without registration. Muslim professors and clerics, particularly in the far south, continue to face additional scrutiny because of continued government concern about the resurgence of Muslim separatist activities; however, this did not appear to interfere with their activities or their ability to practice their faith.

Muslim female civil servants were not permitted to wear headscarves when dressed in civil servant uniforms; however, in practice most female civil servants were permitted by their superiors to wear headscarves if they wished, particularly in the country's southernmost provinces. Muslim female civil servants not required to wear uniforms were allowed to wear headscarves.

=== Abuses of religious freedom ===
There were no reports of religious prisoners or detainees in the country. However, in many Thai schools Buddhism praying is a compulsory activity along with paying respect to Thai Flag, but the student of other religions can freely choose not to perform Buddhism praying (for example, Muslim students are not forced to pray the Buddhism ritual).

=== Forced religious conversion ===
There were no reports of forced religious conversions, including of minor U.S. citizens who had been abducted or illegally removed from the United States, or of the refusal to allow such citizens to be returned to the United States.

== Societal abuses and discrimination ==
There were no reports of societal abuses or discrimination based on religious belief or practice; however, religious groups closely associated with ethnic minorities, such as Muslims, experienced some societal economic discrimination. Such discrimination appeared to be linked more to ethnicity than to religion. Continued violence in the far southern regions of the country contributed to negative stereotypes of Muslims held by persons from other geographic areas of the country. Killings clearly targeted at Buddhists increased ethnic tensions between Muslim and Buddhist communities in the far south.

Violent acts committed by suspected separatist militants in the Muslim-majority provinces of Narathiwat, Pattani, Songkhla, and Yala affected the ability of some Buddhists in this predominantly Muslim region to undertake the full range of their traditional religious practices. During the reporting period, 13 suspects were arrested and were in the process of being tried for the deaths of a Buddhist monk and two novices in an October 2005 attack on a Buddhist temple in Pattani Province.

There were almost daily attacks by suspected separatist militants in the country's southernmost provinces on both government officials and Buddhists and Muslim civilians. On March 14, 2007, assailants ambushed a van in Yala Province killing eight Buddhist passengers including two teenage girls. That evening, 2 bombs exploded outside a nearby mosque and teashop, killing 3 Muslims and injuring 20. On March 19, 2007, gunmen killed three Muslim students and injured seven others at an Islamic boarding school in Songkhla Province. The violence contributed to an atmosphere of fear and suspicion in the southern provinces. As a result of a series of increasingly provocative attacks, the level of tension between the local Muslim and Buddhist communities continued to grow. Government officials and observers expressed concern that the violence could result in open communal conflict.

On October 11, 2006, a monk was injured by a bomb in Narathiwat Province. Three others were injured in a separate incident on October 23. The monks were performing the morning ritual of receiving donations of food and were guarded by three armed soldiers, one of whom subsequently died from the explosion.

At the end of the reporting period, no one had been arrested for the 2004 killing of three Buddhist monks and the beheading of one civilian Buddhist rubber tapper, or for the 2004 attacks on Buddhist temples and one Chinese shrine in the southern provinces of the country. The Government continued to investigate these incidents in the context of security operations involving the ongoing separatist violence in the South. Buddhist monks continued to report that they were fearful and thus no longer able to travel freely through southern communities to receive alms. They also claimed that laypersons sometimes declined to assist them in their daily activities out of fear of being targeted by militants. In response to the killings, the Government stationed troops to protect the religious practitioners and structures of all faiths in communities where the potential for violence existed and provided armed escort for Buddhist monks, where necessary, for their daily rounds to receive alms.

== See also ==
- Religion in Thailand
- Human rights in Thailand
