= True–DTAC merger =

A corporate merger between True Corporation and DTAC, Thailand's second- and third–largest mobile network operators, took place in 2023, following its first public announcement on 22 November 2021. The deal, which made the combined entity the largest mobile network ahead of current market leader AIS and reduced the mobile provider market to a duopoly, was strongly opposed by academics and civil society groups as detrimental to consumers and the public interest. The National Broadcasting and Telecommunications Commission (NBTC) acknowledged the merger with certain conditions on 20 October 2022, though there had been some legal uncertainty over whether the NBTC had authority to approve such a merger and whether the Trade Competition Commission should be involved. Petitions challenging the decision were made to the Administrative Court in November, by the Thailand Consumers Council and AIS.

The company Citrine Global was formed as a joint venture between True parent Charoen Pokphand Group and DTAC parent Telenor. The company was registered with the Department of Business Development on 9 July 2021 with a registered capital of 100,000 baht. Its office is located at 313 CP Tower Building, Silom Road, Silom, Bang Rak, Bangkok

The company began to appear in its name and role as a Tender Offeror of True and DTAC. After True and DTAC will be merged, the company will buy shares from True at a price of 5.09 baht per share and buy shares from DTAC at a price of 47.76 baht per share. The merger was expected to be completed in late September 2022. Later on 4 April 2022, At the 2022 Annual General Meeting of Shareholders of True Corporation, the meeting resolved to approve the merger with DTAC, Same for DTAC, The meeting on the same day that the Extraordinary General Meeting of Shareholders resolved to approve the merger with True Corporation. The merger was "acknowledged" by the regulator NBTC at a meeting on 20 October 2022. The newly merged company still retain the True Corporation name, which was founded on 1 March 2023 and it was listed on the Stock Exchange of Thailand under the stock ticker symbol TRUE on 3 March 2023.

== Post-merger market conditions and regulatory enforcement ==
Subsequent analysis of the market 1,000 days after the merger took place, highlights a significant deterioration of competition and a failure of regulatory enforcement. The NBTC's decision, achieved through a contested 4-2 vote, was immediately followed by a period of "regulatory slumber," during which the body failed to enforce its own merger conditions designed to mitigate negative impacts, including a mandated 12% average service rate reduction and guaranteed network access for competitors.

This regulatory inaction solidified the new True Corporation and AIS as a full duopoly, controlling 100% of the mobile market with an "extreme concentration" level (Herfindahl-Hirschman Index of 5,000 as of Q3 2025), and protected by consolidated spectrum holdings that act as an "economic moat" against any future competition. The failure to enforce the price conditions led to a rise in Average Revenue Per User (ARPU) for the incumbents, contrary to the promised price cuts.

The regulatory failure was particularly acute in the Mobile Virtual Network Operator (MVNO) sector. Despite conditions that mandated the merged entity make 20% of its network capacity available, create a dedicated MVNO business unit, and offer fair, cost-based wholesale prices without a margin squeeze, these requirements have been ignored.

This inaction led to the complete demise of the MVNO sector; by August 2025, all MVNOs in Thailand, including I-Kool, Penguin SIM, Fields Telecom, Infinite SIM, and redONE, had to cease operation due to not having any network access.

Furthermore, the NBTC Office was accused of "intentional regulatory manipulation" to obstruct new entrants, notably by unilaterally reclassifying a network access dispute filed by MVNO Services Co., Ltd. (a licensed Mobile Virtual Network Aggregator) with the merged company - from a legally binding 'Dispute' to an ignorable 'General Complaint,' thus preventing a timely resolution and creating a bureaucratic trap that blocked market entry.
