= Thailand Tokamak-1 =

TT-1
Thailand Tokamak-1
- Device type: Tokamak
- Location: Nakhon Nayok province, Thailand
- Affiliation: Thailand Institute of Nuclear Technology

Technical specifications
- Major radius: 65 cm (26 in)
- Minor radius: 20 cm (7.9 in)
- Magnetic field: 1.0 T (10,000 G) (toroidal)
- Plasma current: 150 kA

History
- Year(s) of operation: 2023–present

Thailand Tokamak-1 (or TT-1) is a small research tokamak operated by the Thailand Institute of Nuclear Technology in Nakhon Nayok province, Thailand. The tokamak was built in collaboration with the Institute of Plasma Physics of the Chinese Academy of Sciences and features an upgraded design based on the HT-6M tokamak developed in 1984. The first successful test of the device occurred on 21 April 2023. TT-1 officially began operations on 25 July 2023 and became the first tokamak to operate in Southeast Asia.
