= Boonthida Somchai =

Thai politician (born 1984)

- บุณย์ธิดา สมชัย
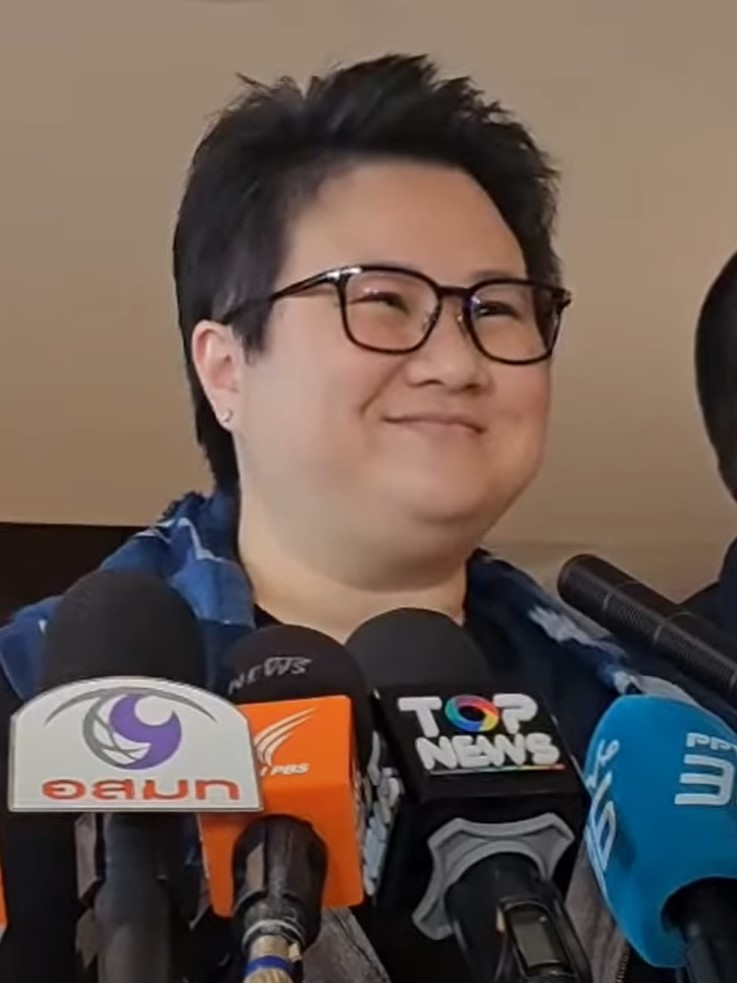
- Boonthida in 2025

Deputy Minister of Digital Economy and Society
- Incumbent
- Assumed office 30 March 2026
- Prime Minister: Anutin Charnvirakul
- Minister: Chaichanok Chidchob

Member of the House of Representatives
- Incumbent
- Assumed office 3 July 2011
- Constituency: Ubon Ratchathani

Personal details
- Born: 7 February 1984 (age 42)
- Party: Bhumjaithai Party (since 2023)
- Parent: Issara Somchai (father)

Boonthida Somchai (Thai: บุณย์ธิดา สมชัย; born 7 February 1984) is a Thai politician serving as a member of the House of Representatives since 2011. She is the daughter of Issara Somchai.
