= Defence Technology Institute =

Thai research and development agency

Defence Technology Institute (Public Organization)
- สถาบันเทคโนโลยีป้องกันประเทศ (องค์การมหาชน)

Agency overview
- Formed: 2009; 17 years ago
- Type: Research institute
- Jurisdiction: Government of Thailand
- Headquarters: Pak Kret, Nonthaburi, Thailand; 13.9105°N 100.5498°E
- Parent department: Ministry of Defence
- Website: Official website

The Defence Technology Institute (Public Organization) (DTI) is a research and development agency operating as a public organization under the oversight of the Thai Ministry of Defence.

== Background ==
The DTI was founded on 1 January 2009 as part of a programme to increase domestic arms manufacturing capabilities.

== Research and development ==
The DTI produces the Black Widow Spider 8x8 armoured vehicle for the Thai army in collaboration with Ricardo.

In 2017 DTI signed a Memorandum of Understanding with Leonardo helicopters covering "technology transfer and the establishment of helicopter maintenance, repair & overhaul".

The DTI has been involved in experiments to reduce air pollution in Bangkok using water-spraying drones.

In 2018, DTI signed a Memorandum of Agreement (MOA) with UK defence company, Arturius International and its Thai representative, GCS Group Corporation Company. The collaboration aims to create a Counter Threat Centre of Excellence in Thailand.

Gp Capt Chamnan Kumsap, director for knowledge management and the publication department at the DTI told the Bangkok post in 2018 that, "We plan to draft the Defence Technology Agency bill because it will unlock our ability to conduct joint defence projects".

== See also ==
- Agency for Defense Development - South Korea
- Defense Advanced Research Projects Agency - United States
- Defence Industry Agency - Turkey
- Defence Research and Development Organisation - India
- Military Institute of Armament Technology - Poland
- National Chung-Shan Institute of Science and Technology - Taiwan
- Rafael Advanced Defense Systems - Israel
- Swedish Defence Research Agency - Sweden
