= Sakaerat Biosphere Reserve =

Biosphere reserve in Nakhon Ratchasima province, Thailand

Sakaerat Biosphere Reserve พื้นที่สงวนชีวมณฑลสะแกราช
- Interactive map of Sakaerat Biosphere Reserve พื้นที่สงวนชีวมณฑลสะแกราช
- Location: Nakhon Ratchasima province
- Nearest city: Nakhon Ratchasima
- Coordinates: 14°29′15″N 101°54′36″E
- Area: 82,315 ha (203,400 acres)
- Established: 1976

Sakaerat Biosphere Reserve (Thai: พื้นที่สงวนชีวมณฑลสะแกราช) is a biosphere reserve in Nakhon Ratchasima province, Thailand. Located west of Khao Yai National Park and south of Nakhon Ratchasima city center, the reserve is composed primarily of dry evergreen forests, mixed deciduous forests, dry dipterocarp forests, and reforested areas. This reserve has been listed as a biosphere reserve by UNESCO, nominated in 1976. The reserve's area is 82,315 hectares (823.15 km^{2}), with over 380 floral species, 486 wildlife species, and 533 species of invertebrates.

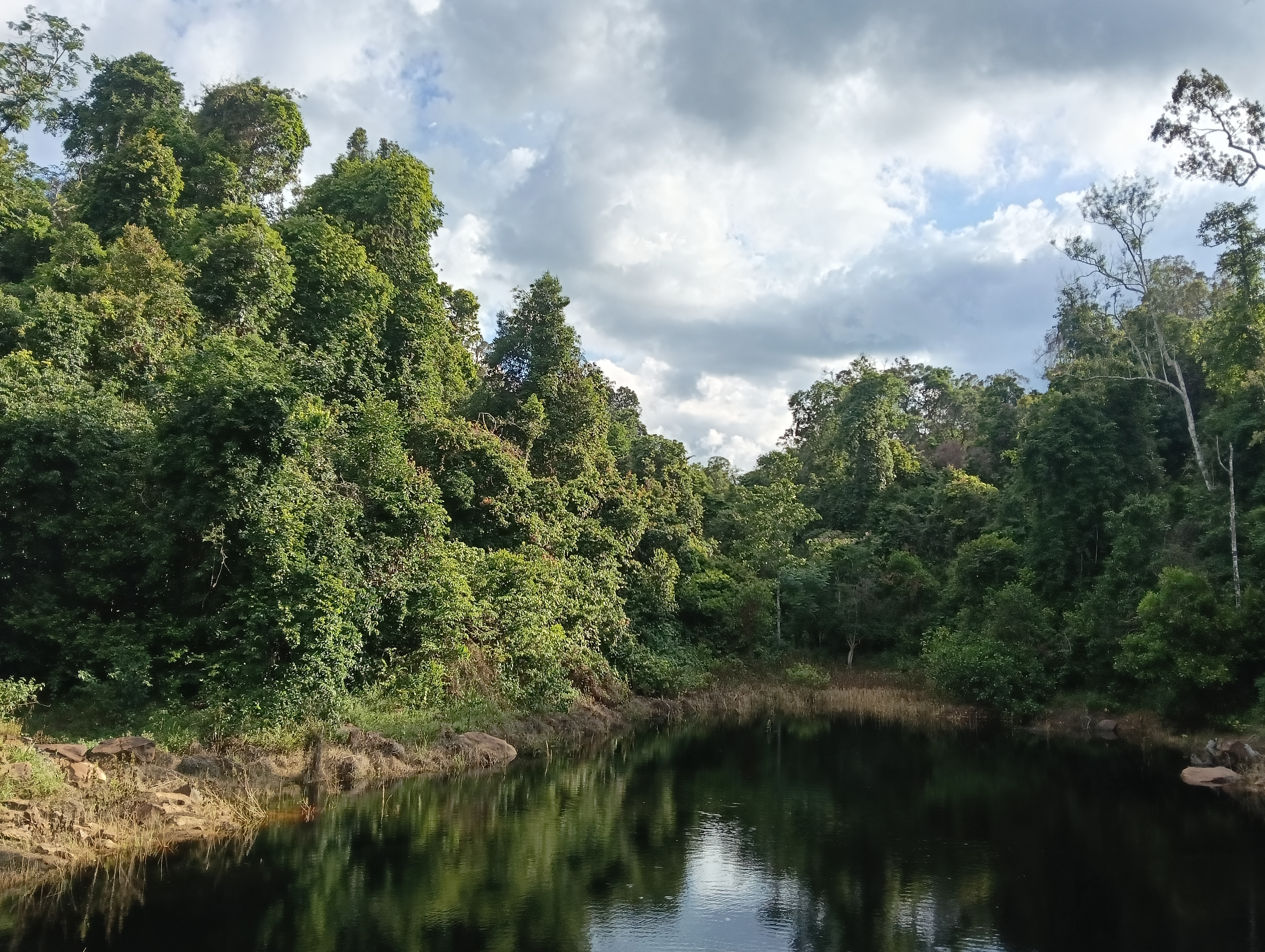

== Sakaerat Environmental Research Station ==
The Sakaerat Environmental Research Station (SERS) (Thai: สถานีวิจัยสิ่งแวดล้อมสะแกราช) was established by the Thai government on 19 September 1967. The station is administered by the Thailand Institute of Scientific and Technological Research.

=== Herpetology research ===
Sakaerat is a prominent location for herpetology research, held in conjunction with Suranaree University of Technology (SUT). The School of Biology of SUT's Institute of Science established a tropical snake study program in 2010.

==== Sakaerat Conservation and Snake Education Team (SCSET) ====
Target species include the Burmese python, king cobra, Malayan krait, and green cat snake.

Sakaerat Najas Project

Target species include the Indochinese spitting cobra and monocled cobra.

Sakaerat Tortoise Telemetry Project

Target species include the elongated tortoise.
