= Thailand Center of Excellence for Life Sciences =

Thai governmental research institute

- ศูนย์ความเป็นเลิศด้านชีววิทยาศาสตร์
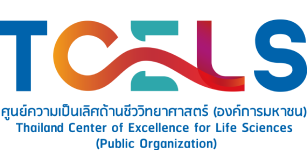

Public organization overview
- Formed: 2004
- Type: Research institute
- Jurisdiction: Government of Thailand
- Headquarters: Building C, Chaeng Watthana Government Complex
- Public organization executive: Jittiporn Thammajinda, CEO
- Parent department: Ministry of Higher Education, Science, Research and Innovation
- Website: Official website

The Thailand Center of Excellence for Life Sciences (TCELS) was founded in 2004 by the government of Thailand. TCELS is a public organization under the auspices of the Ministry of Higher Education, Science, Research and Innovation. TCELS has the responsibility of providing a link between innovation in life sciences and investment, and spurring domestic and international partnership in the life science business in Thailand.

== History ==
TCELS was founded in 2004. Initially, TCELS was established as an organization under the umbrella of the Office of Knowledge Management and Development (OKMD), which houses a group of public organizations under the supervision of the Office of the Prime Minister. On 27 May 2011, TCELS was elevated to a public organization under the Ministry of Science and Technology (MST).

== Mission ==
- Support and develop the life sciences business and industry.
- Promote and support innovations, research, and knowledge related to the commercialization of life sciences products and services.
- Develop and support the necessary infrastructure and human capacity for life sciences business and industry.
- Create a strategic plan for developing life sciences business and industry.
- Serve as the coordination center for facilitating cooperation among domestic and international organizations for life sciences business and industry.
- Serve as Thailand’s life sciences business information and knowledge center.

== Focus areas ==
=== Pharmaceuticals and biotechnology ===
A key project is pharmacogenomics. TCELS supports the Medical Genomic Center to promote awareness of this diagnostic tool.

=== Natural products ===
TCELS has supported a project with the aim of developing new products from Hevea brasiliensis. The research is conducted by a team from Prince of Songkhla University.

=== Biomedical engineering ===
TCELS conducts various projects in medical robotics, medical devices, and operates the Advanced Dental Technology Center (ADTEC).

=== Medical services ===
- Advanced Cell and Gene Therapies Program
- Automated Cell and Tissue Production Plant
