= Jiraporn Sindhuprai =

Thai politician

- จิราพร สินธุไพร
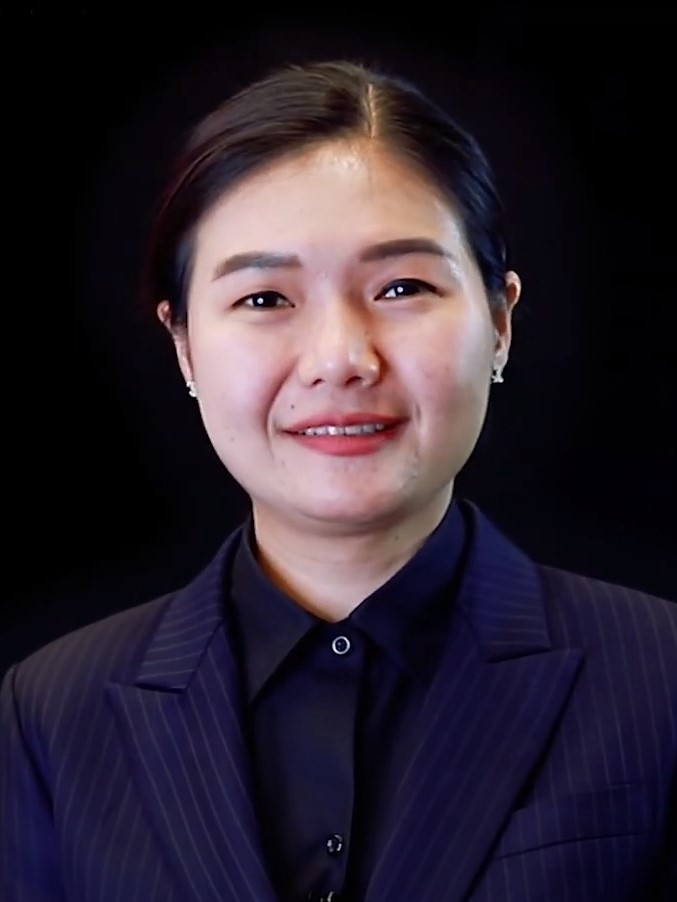

Acting Minister of Culture
- Incumbent
- Assumed office 8 July 2025
- Monarch: Vajiralongkorn
- Prime Minister: Paetongtarn Shinawatra
- Preceded by: Supamas Isarabhakdi

Minister Attached to the Prime Minister's Office
- Incumbent
- Assumed office 27 April 2024
- Monarch: Vajiralongkorn
- Prime Minister: Srettha Thavisin; Paetongtarn Shinawatra

Member of the House of Representatives
- Incumbent
- Assumed office 24 March 2019
- Preceded by: Em-on Sindhuprai

Personal details
- Party: Pheu Thai

Jiraporn Sindhuprai (Thai: จิราพร สินธุไพร, RTGS: Chiraphon Sinthuphrai) is a Thai politician, serving as the acting Minister of Culture since July 2025, and a Member of the House of Representatives for Roi Et since 2019. She is the daughter of Nisit Sindhuprai, former Member of the House of Representatives for Roi Et, and Em-on Sindhuprai, former party-list MP for Pheu Thai.

== Royal decorations ==
Jiraporn her received the following royal decorations in the Honours System of Thailand:

- 2024 - Knight Grand Cross of the Most Exalted Order of the White Elephant
- 2020 - Knight Commander of the Most Noble Order of the Crown of Thailand
