= Office of the Council of State =

- สำนักงานคณะกรรมการกฤษฎีกา

Agency overview
- Formed: 1874
- Headquarters: Bangkok, Thailand
- Agency executive: Pakorn Nilprapunt, Secretary-General
- Parent agency: Office of the Prime Minister
- Website: ocs.go.th

The Office of the Council of State (OCS, Thai: สำนักงานคณะกรรมการกฤษฎีกา) is a department-level Thai government agency under the Office of the Prime Minister. The office serves as the operating body of the Council of State, a legal advisory body for the Royal Thai Government. The OCS reports directly to the prime minister.

== Function ==
The OCS is most familiar to the public for its role in interpreting laws and issues with their implementation (such as their constitutionality), but is importantly also responsible for drafting laws for the Cabinet and state agencies. It is also tasked with developing administrative jurisprudence, providing training for public lawyers, coordinating with international legal institutions, and researching improvements to the country's legal code.

The OCS also vets the qualifications of candidates nominated for cabinet positions.
