= Digital Government Development Agency =

Thai public organization for digitizing Thai government services

- สำนักงานพัฒนารัฐบาลดิจิทัล

Public Organization overview
- Formed: 13 May 2018; 8 years ago
- Preceding agencies: Electronic Government Agency (EGA); Government Information Technology Services (GITS)
- Headquarters: Bangkok, Thailand
- Annual budget: 1,662 million baht (FY2019)
- Public Organization executive: Nopparat Maythaveekulchai, President
- Parent department: Ministry of Digital Economy and Society
- Website: Official website

The Digital Government Development Agency (Public Organization) (Abrv: สพร.-DGA; Thai: สำนักงานพัฒนารัฐบาลดิจิทัล, RTGS: samnak ngan phatthana rat ban dichiton) is a Thai governmental agency whose mission is to digitize the workings of the Thai government through goal and standards setting, establishing best practices, and training of government employees. In the United Nations E-Government Survey 2018, Thailand was ranked 73 of 193 nations in the provision of digital services to citizens.

== History ==
On 21 May 1997 the government established the Government Information Technology Services (GITS) under the National Science and Technology Development Agency (NSTDA). On 21 February 2011, the Electronic Government Agency (Public Organization) (EGA) replaced GITS. The new agency, EGA, reported to the Ministry of Information and Communication Technology which later became the Ministry of Digital Economy and Society. On 13 May 2018, the Electronic Government Agency (EGA) became the Digital Government Development Agency (DGA) reporting to the Office of the Prime Minister.

As of October 2019, the president and CEO of the DGA is Dr Sak Segkhoonthod.

DGA's budget for FY2019 was 1,662 million baht.

In 2026, The Digital Government Development Agency (DGA) has been transferred under the direct control of the Ministry of Digital Economy and Society. This move ensures unified policy implementation and aligns with the Ministry's mission.

== Mission ==
The Thai government has set the goal of all state agencies to become fully digitized by 2022. In October 2019 the DGA was given the mission of drafting a digital road map (2020-2022) for the government by November 2019. The road map will then be submitted to the cabinet to make it official policy. The agency has been working off of interim plans approved by the cabinet for several years already.

== Programs and plans ==
The agency introduced the e-government portal www.egov.go.th several years ago to serve as a central information hub, helping people to obtain public services. It also developed and introduced in early-2019 the CITIZENinfo application, offering information for those searching for state agencies at 8,000 locations nationwide as well as posting the forms required by citizens to conduct business with those state agencies.

In 2018 the DGA published a two-year digital road map. The road map includes seven functions that ensure a full digital government transformation: government data exchange; one-stop service; government data centers; open government data; unified government communications; secure government intranet; and digital transformation programs.

== See also ==
- Digital identity
- E-government
