= National Science Museum (Thailand) =

State enterprise in Thailand

National Science Museum Organisation Of Thailand
- องค์การพิพิธภัณฑ์วิทยาศาสตร์แห่งชาติ
- Established: January 30, 1995; 31 years ago
- Coordinates: 14.0484458°N 100.7168597°E
- Type: Science centre
- Accreditation: Asia Pacific Network of Science & Technology Centres (ASPAC)
- President: Assistant professor Rawin Raviwongse
- Owner: Ministry of Higher Education, Science, Research and Innovation
- Website: Official website

The National Science Museum Organisation Of Thailand (NSM) (Thai: องค์การพิพิธภัณฑ์วิทยาศาสตร์แห่งชาติ) is a state enterprise established on 30 January 1995 under the Ministry of Higher Education, Science, Research and Innovation. NSM develops and currently operates 4 museums and 2 learning centers to raise public awareness of science for Thai society. The museums are the Science Museum, Natural History Museum, Information Technology Museum and RAMA 9 Museum. All the museums are located at Technopolis Khlong 5, Khlong Luang, Pathum Thani. The NSM's learning centers are NSM Science Square @ the Street Ratchada located in Bangkok and NSM Science Square @ Chiang Mai located in Princess Siridhorn AstroPark.

== Gallery ==
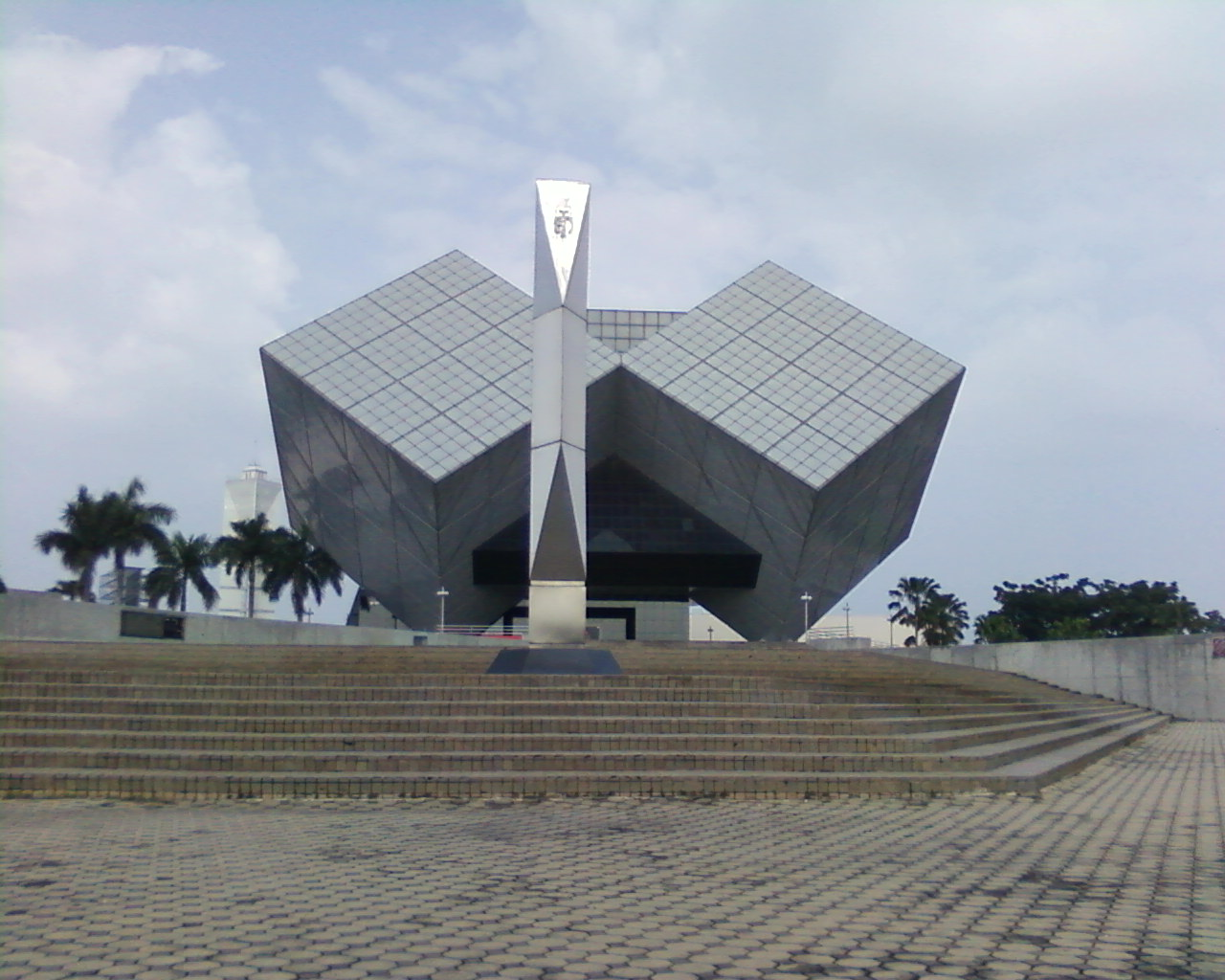

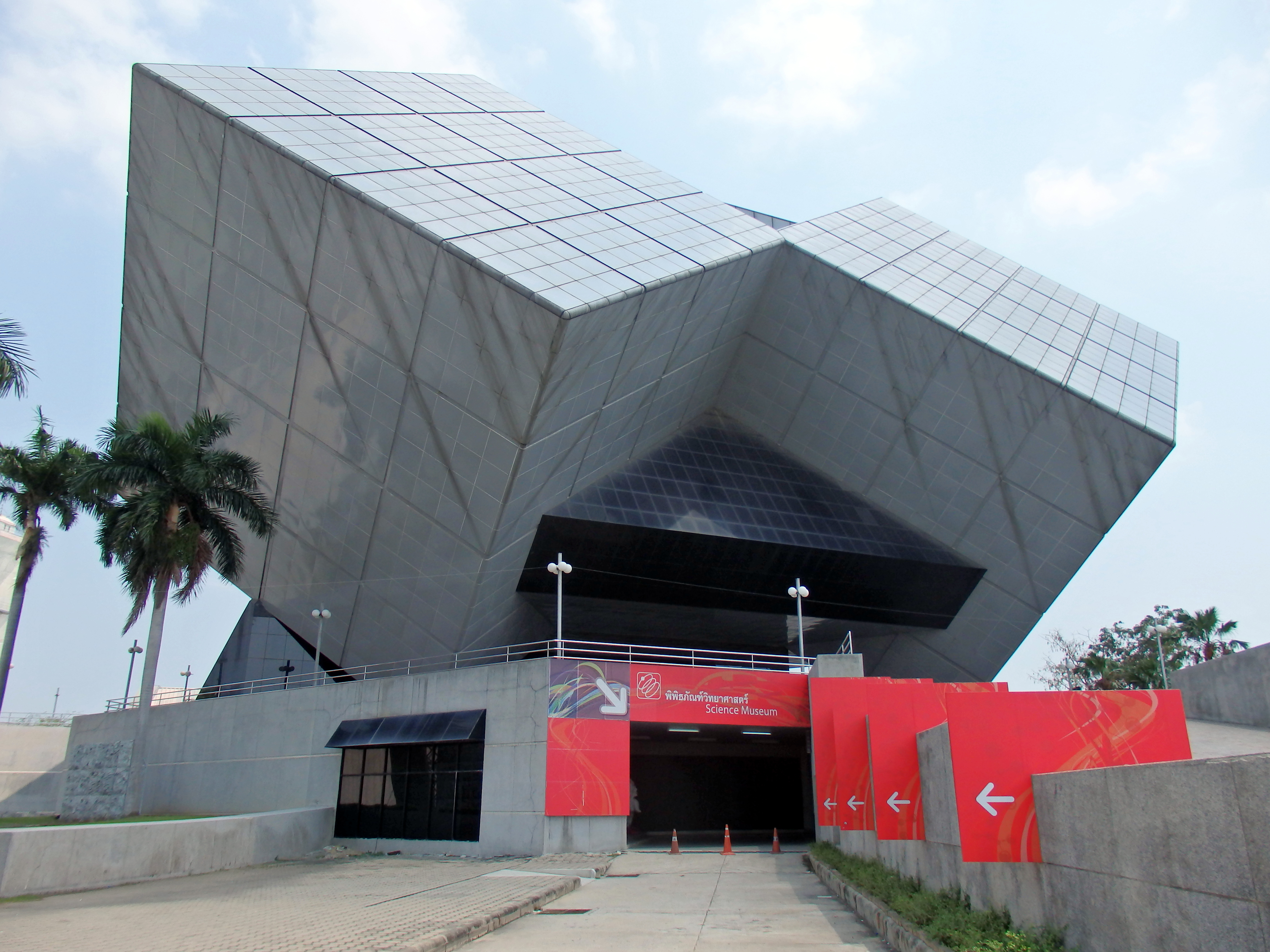

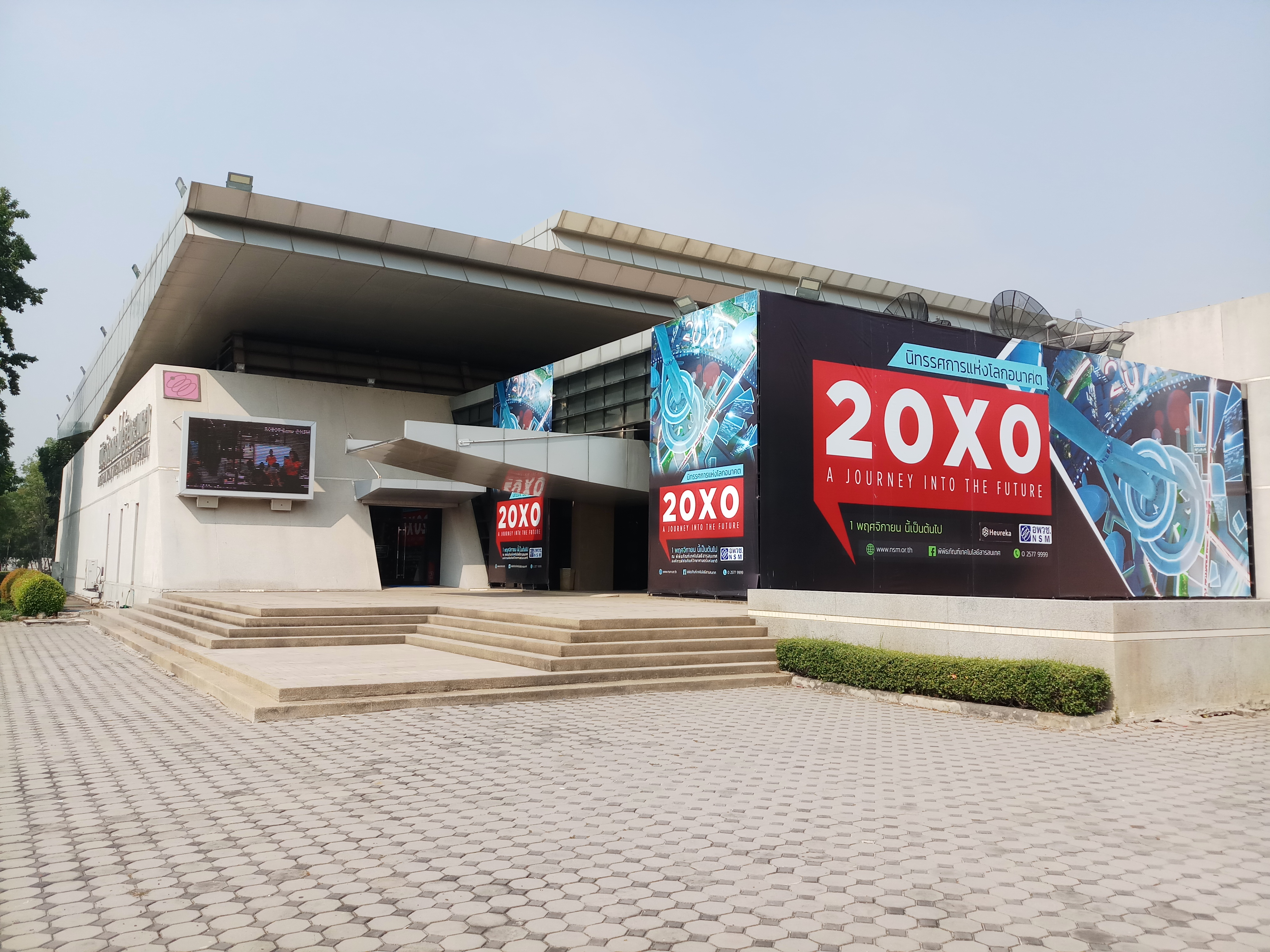

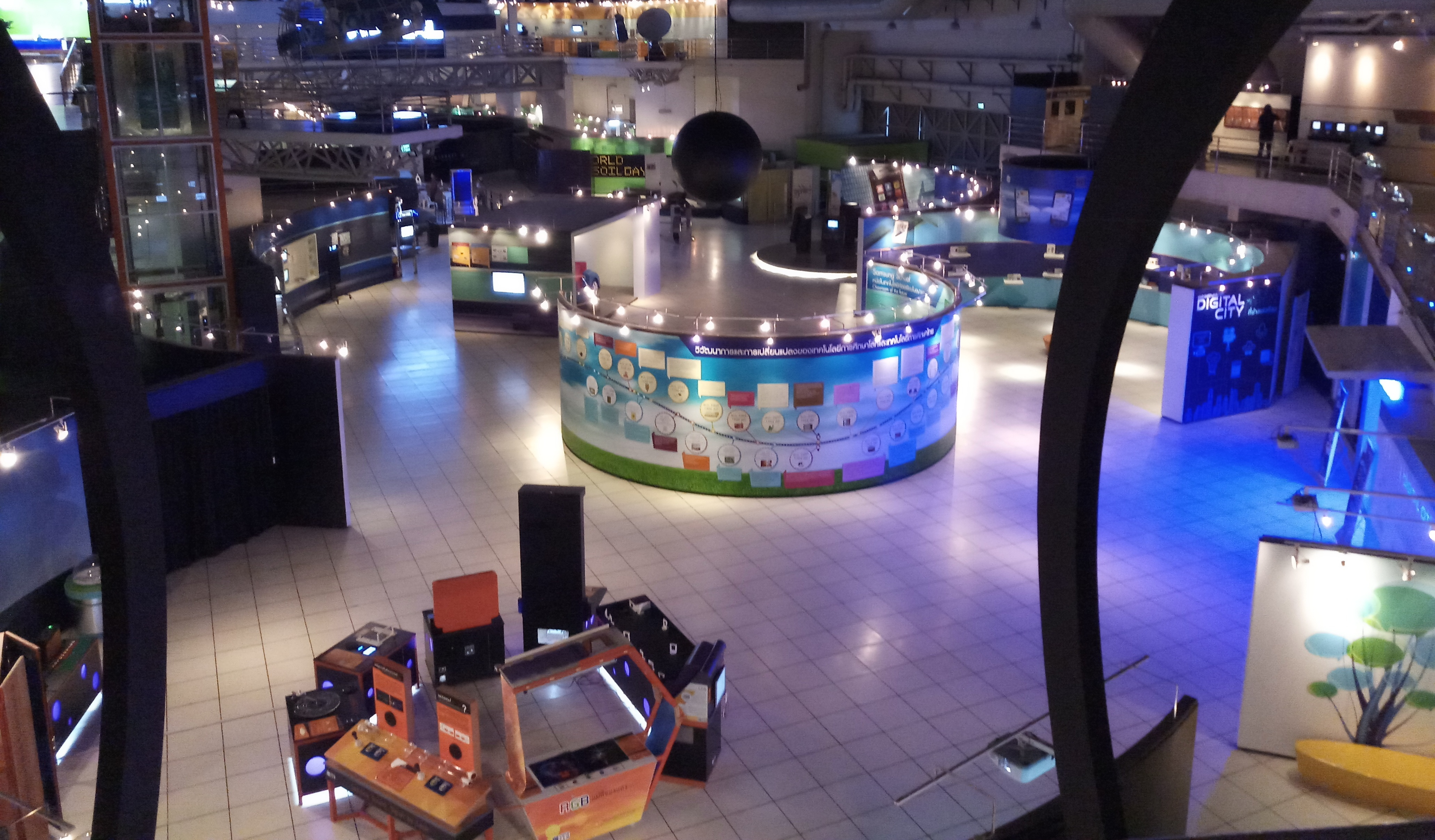

== Literature ==
- Lenzi, Iola (2004). Museums of Southeast Asia. Singapore: Archipelago Press. p. 200 pages. ISBN 981-4068-96-9.
