= Trade Competition Commission =

The Trade Competition Commission (TCC, Thai: คณะกรรมการการแข่งขันทางการค้า), served by its operating body the Trade Competition Commission of Thailand (TCCT สำนักงานคณะกรรมการการแข่งขันทางการค้า, previously the Office of Trade Competition Commission, OTCC), is the competition regulator of Thailand. First established in 1999, it was reconceived as an independent agency with regulatory powers in 2017.

Prior to 2017, the relevant law, the Trade Competition Act, B.E. 2542 (1999), first established the body as a bureau under the Ministry of Commerce's Department of Internal Trade, operating as a government agency overseen by an appointed Trade Competition Board (TCB) chaired ex officio by the commerce minister. Over the following decade, this legal structure proved inefficient and inadequate—the TCB pursued only one case, against A.P. Honda in 2003, which was dropped after the statute of limitations expired as the case was drawn out for ten years—leading the TCB to be widely seen as a paper tiger. A new law, the Trade Competition Act, B.E. 2560 (2017), repealed the old structure and re-established the OTCC as an independent regulatory agency with broader powers, including the authority to impose fines and penalties and to approve or reject proposed mergers that could lead to "a monopoly or undue market dominance against consumer interests". However, its authority does not extend to sectors with other regulatory laws in place such as telecommunications and energy.

The first high-profile case to come before the new TCC was the sale of the Tesco Lotus hypermarket chain to CP Group in 2020, which was seen as a major test of the agency's will to take on Thailand's powerful business tycoons. The deal was approved with restrictions in a 4–3 vote, where the commission noted that "the deal may significantly lower competition but won't create major damage to the economy or consumers' benefits." The decision was sharply criticised by academics, members of the public, as well as dissenting commission members, including the chairman.
