= Geo-Informatics and Space Technology Development Agency =

Thai space agency

- สำนักงานพัฒนาเทคโนโลยีอวกาศและภูมิสารสนเทศ
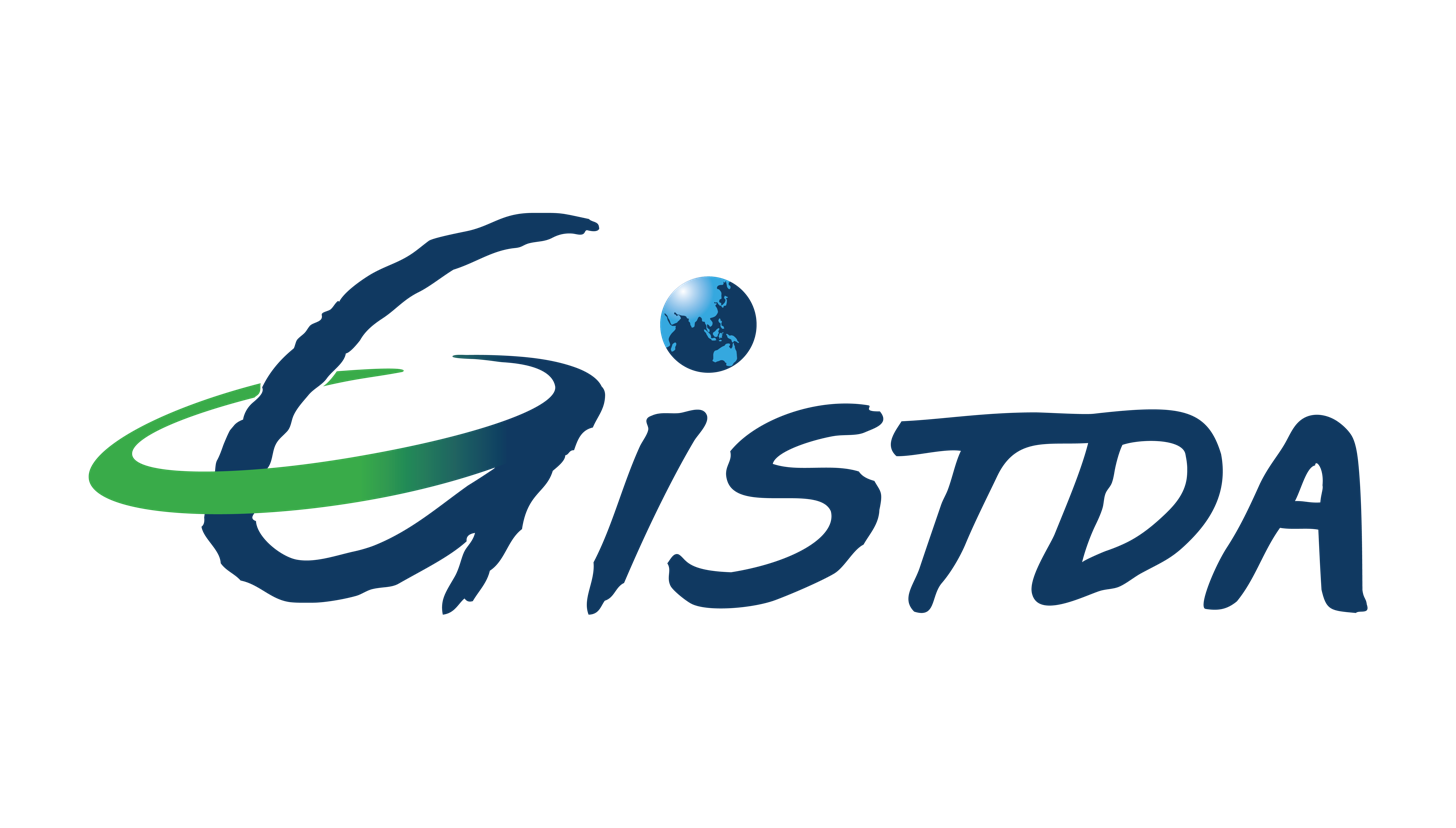

Agency overview
- Abbreviation: GISTDA
- Formed: 3 November 2000
- Type: Space agency
- Headquarters: Chaeng Watthana Government Complex, Lak Si, Bangkok
- Motto: Delivering Values From Space
- Primary spaceports: GISTDA THEOS Control & Receiving Station (Si Racha)
- Owner: Ministry of Higher Education, Science, Research and Innovation
- Website: www.gistda.or.th

The Geo-Informatics and Space Technology Development Agency (Public Organization) (Thai: สำนักงานพัฒนาเทคโนโลยีอวกาศและภูมิสารสนเทศ, romanized: Samnakngan Phatna Theknoloyi Awakat Lae Phumi Sansonthet) or, in brief, GISTDA (Thai: สทอภ), is a Thai space agency and space research organisation. It is responsible for remote sensing and technology development satellites.

It has its offices in Chaeng Watthana Government Complex, Bangkok.

== History ==
In 1971, Thailand had a satellite natural resource survey project by joining the NASA ERTS-1, which is a project of the National Aeronautics and Space Administration (NASA) under the operation of the National Research Council of Thailand at that time. Due to the success of the project, the status of the project has changed is the division level name to "Satellite Natural Resources Survey Division" in 1979.

In 2000, the Ministry of Science Technology and Environment has set up a new space technology unit by combining the Satellite Natural Resources Survey Division of Office of the National Research Council and the Department of Coordination and Promotion of Geographic information system Development Information Center of the Office of the Permanent Secretary for Science Technology and Environment, into the name of Geo-Informatics and Space Technology Development Agency (Public Organization).

== Satellite programs ==
=== THEOS ===
GISTDA owns the THEOS (Thaichote) satellite, which was launched by a Dnepr rocket from the Dombarovskiy Cosmodrome in Russia on 1 October 2008.

=== THEOS-2 and 2A ===
In June 2018, GISTDA selected Airbus to build the THEOS-2 satellite, an observation satellite that will replace THEOS satellite. The satellite was launched by the Vega rocket from Guiana Space Centre in French Guiana on 9 October 2023.

In October 2023, GISTDA made plans to launch an accompanying smallsat, THEOS-2A, on a PSLV. The satellite was launched on 12 January 2025 with flight PSLV-C62 from Satish Dhawan Space Centre in India. However, the satellite launch failed because the PSLV-C62 rocket malfunctioned during the final phase of the third stage. An anomaly in the stability control system caused the flight path to deviate from the planned trajectory, preventing the THEOS-2A satellite from entering orbit.

=== THEOS-3 ===
In September 2023, GISTDA announced their intention to build the third THEOS-3 satellite, an observation micro satellite in a Sun-synchronous orbit. Its design is based on the THEOS-2A satellite.

== Human spaceflight program ==
Although Thailand does not currently have its own astronauts, Pirada Techavijit, a satellite control team leader of the GISTDA, was previously selected to train for sub-orbital spaceflight with the Axe Apollo sub-orbital spaceflights aboard the XCOR Lynx spaceplane in 2014. However, Unilever's plan to send people to space did not proceed because XCOR Aerospace, the developer of the Lynx spacecraft, went bankrupt in 2017. Had the mission succeeded, Pirada would have been the first Thai astronaut to reach outer space.

== See also ==
- List of government space agencies
