= THEOS (satellite) =

Thai Earth observation satellite

- Names: Thaichote
- Mission type: Earth Observation
- Operator: GISTDA
- COSPAR ID: 2008-049A
- SATCAT no.: 33396

Spacecraft properties
- Manufacturer: Astrium SAS
- Launch mass: 715 kg (1,576 lb)
- Dimensions: 2.1x2.1x2.4 m (6.89x6.89x7.87 ft)
- Power: 840 W

Start of mission
- Launch date: 06:37, 1 October 2008 (UTC)
- Rocket: Dnepr

Orbital parameters
- Reference system: Geocentric
- Regime: Sun-synchronous, LEO
- Eccentricity: ≈0
- Perigee altitude: 825 km (513 mi)
- Apogee altitude: 826 km (513 mi)
- Inclination: 98.78°
- Period: 101.4 minutes

THEOS, also known as Thaichote, is an Earth observation mission of Thailand, developed at EADS Astrium SAS, Toulouse, France. In July 2004, EADS Astrium SAS signed a contract for delivery of THEOS with GISTDA (Geo-Informatics and Space Technology Development Agency) of Bangkok, Thailand. GISTDA is Thailand's leading national organization (i.e., space agency) in the field of space activities and applications. The Thai Ministry of Science and Technology funds the program.

THEOS was launched from Dombarovskiy at 06:37 UTC on 1 October 2008, by a Dnepr rocket. The satellite was initially planned for a 2007 launch using the space vehicle Rokot of Eurockot Launch Services . The contract was however canceled when Eurockot faced a parts shortage.

On 24 March 2014, THEOS captured images showing some 300 objects in close proximity to the suspected crash site of Malaysia Airlines Flight MH370, in the Indian Ocean. The discovery was reported by GISTDA on 27 March 2014. The objects have not yet been identified as debris.

== Benefits ==
THEOS was used to observe natural resources in the country by gathering information to be used by both the government and public for research and mapping. THEOS observation missions are conducted to observe agriculture sites, the production of agricultural crops, forest demolition, forest types, shrimp farms, water pollution from oil leaks, water sources, community areas, illegal farms, disaster areas, and the satellite can also be used for city planning. THEOS also reduces the cost of purchasing satellite images from other countries. Moreover, the information that is gathered from the satellite can also be sold to other countries. Thailand has also gained knowledge and technology for designing and building satellite from the French. In addition, specialists from France also travel to Thailand to teach Thai personnel every year.

== Overview ==
THEOS was designed to be a small sized satellite with a mass of 750 kg (include equipment and fuel). It has a hexagonal shape with a height of 2.4 meters and a width of 2 meters (when the solar panel folds). It was launched into low Earth orbit in 2008 to an altitude of 822 km and with an inclination of 98 degrees. It is equipped with optical imagery which can observe in the visible band to near infrared. Its mission duration is expected to be at least 5 years.
