= Digital Economy Promotion Agency =

Thai government agency

- สำนักงานส่งเสริมเศรษฐกิจดิจิทัล

Agency overview
- Formed: January 23, 2017
- Agency executives: Nuttapon Nimmanphatcharin, President and CEO; Supakorn Siddhichai, Executive Vice President
- Parent Agency: Ministry of Digital Economy and Society
- Website: depa.or.th

The Digital Economy Promotion Agency (depa, Thai: สำนักงานส่งเสริมเศรษฐกิจดิจิทัล) is a government agency under the purview of the Thai Ministry of Digital Economy and Society. Established by the Digital Economy and Society Development Act B.E. 2560 (2017), the agency supports the growth and development of Thailand’s digital economy.

== Operations ==
=== Smart city initiatives ===
depa launched the smart city ambassadors (SCA) program to development smart cities alongside local agencies. As of 2023, Thailand has over 100 smart cities under development, an increase from 27 at the launch of the national smart nation framework in 2019.

In September 2024, depa announced that four southern provinces and cities in China are collaborating to develop smart cities. Part of the Belt and Road Initiative (BRI), the collaboration aims to develop soft digital infrastructure, including submarine cables and constructing laser centers.

=== Digital content ===
In October 2024, depa launched an initiative to support Thailand's digital content industry, including gaming and e-sports.

=== Skill and job development ===
In January 2025, depa outlined plans for Thailand to become a global technology and supply chain hub. The initiative aims to promote digital talent and job creation across Thailand through tax incentives. This includes launching the Thailand Digital Catalog, which compiles digital services and products for the public and private sectors.

== Artificial intelligence ==
depa's Thailand Digital Technology Foresight 2035 report predicted Thailand's AI market size by 2030 will reach 114 billion baht. Statista estimates Thailand's GenAI market will reach $180 million in 2024 and $1.7 billion in 2030.
