= Sudawan Wangsuphakijkosol =

Thai politician

- สุดาวรรณ หวังศุภกิจโกศล
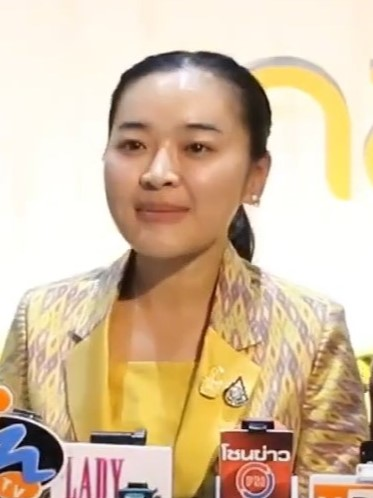
- Sudawan in 2024

Minister of Higher Education, Science, Research and Innovation
- In office 30 June 2025 – 19 September 2025
- Prime Minister: Paetongtarn Shinawatra

Minister of Culture
- In office 27 April 2024 – 30 June 2025
- Prime Minister: Srettha Thavisin; Phumtham Wechayachai (acting); Paetongtarn Shinawatra
- Preceded by: Sermsak Pongpanich
- Succeeded by: Paetongtarn Shinawatra

Minister of Tourism and Sports
- In office 1 September 2023 – 27 April 2024
- Prime Minister: Srettha Thavisin
- Preceded by: Phipat Ratchakitprakarn
- Succeeded by: Sermsak Pongpanich

Personal details
- Born: 8 August 1982 (age 43)
- Party: Pheu Thai Party (2023–present); Bhumjaithai (until 2023)
- Parent: Weerasak Wangsuphakijkosol (father)
- Education: Suranaree University of Technology (BS)

Sudawan Wangsuphakijkosol (Thai: สุดาวรรณ หวังศุภกิจโกศล, RTGS: Sudawan Wangsuphakitkoson; born 8 August 1982) is a Thai politician who served as Minister of Culture from April 2024 to June 2025. She previously served as Minister of Tourism and Sports from 2023 to 2024.

== Early life and education ==
Born in 1982, Sudawan is the eldest daughter of former Deputy Commerce Minister Weerasak Wangsuphakijkosol and Yolada Wangsuphakijkosol, chief executive of the Nakhon Ratchasima Provincial Administrative Organization. Sudawan received a Bachelor of Science in engineering from Suranaree University of Technology.

== Royal decorations ==
Sudawan has received the following royal decoration in the Thai honours system:

- 2024 – Knight Grand Cross of the Most Exalted Order of the White Elephant
