= List of professional associations and regulatory councils in Thailand =

Several professional associations and professional regulatory councils operate in Thailand.

== Regulatory councils ==
There are thirteen professional regulatory councils, as stipulated by their respective laws. They have the authority to issue and revoke licences to practise the professions under their regulatory control.

- Architect Council
- Dental Council
- Council of Engineers
- Council of Science and Technology Professionals
- Federation of Accounting Professions
- Lawyer Council
- Medical Council
- Medical Technology Council
- Nursing and Midwifery Council
- Pharmacy Council
- Physical Therapy Council
- Teacher's Council (Khurusapha)
- Veterinary Council

Eleven of them—the medical, nursing, pharmacy, dental, engineers, veterinary, medical technology, physical therapy, architect, lawyer, and accounting councils—together form the Federation of Professional Councils of Thailand.

== Professional associations ==
Professional associations are private bodies established to further education and the interests of their respective professions.

- Association of Medical Technologists of Thailand
- Association of Siamese Architects
- Dental Association Of Thailand
- Education Society of Thailand
- Engineering Institute of Thailand
- Federation of Teachers Association of Thailand
- Medical Association of Thailand
- National Federation of Motion Pictures and Contents Associations (NFMPCA)
- National Thai Teacher Union
- Nurses' Association of Thailand
- Pharmaceutical Association of Thailand
- Physical Therapy Association of Thailand
- Private School Teachers' Association of Thailand
- Secondary School Administrator Association of Thailand
- Thai Accountant Association
- Thai Accounting Firms Association
- Thai Bar Association
- Thai CPA Firms Association
- Thai Institute of Chemical Engineering and Applied Chemistry (TICEAC)
- Veterinary Practitioners Association of Thailand
