= Office of the Higher Education Commission =

Government organization in Bangkok, Thailand

- สำนักงานคณะกรรมการการอุดมศึกษา

Department overview
- Formed: 2003
- Preceding department: Ministry of University Affairs
- Headquarters: Bangkok, Thailand
- Employees: 500 people
- Parent ministry: Ministry of Higher Education, Science, Research and Innovation
- Website: www.ops.go.th

The Office of the Higher Education Commission (OHEC, Thai: สำนักงานคณะกรรมการการอุดมศึกษา, RTGS: Samnakngan Khanakammakan Kan Udomsueksa) is a department-level agency of the Thai government. It is the operating body of the Higher Education Commission, which oversees the country's universities and other higher education institutions.

The office was established as the Ministry of State University Affairs in 1972, operating as a sub-ministry under the Office of the Prime Minister. It was elevated to ministry level in 1977, and became known as the Ministry of University Affairs (ทบวงมหาวิทยาลัย, RTGS: Thabuang Mahawitthayalai) until 2003, when it was restructured and absorbed into the Ministry of Education as the Office of the Higher Education Commission.

In 2019, the Office was transferred to the new Ministry of Higher Education, Science, Research and Innovation.
