= Supamas Isarabhakdi =

Thai politician

- ศุภมาส อิศรภักดี
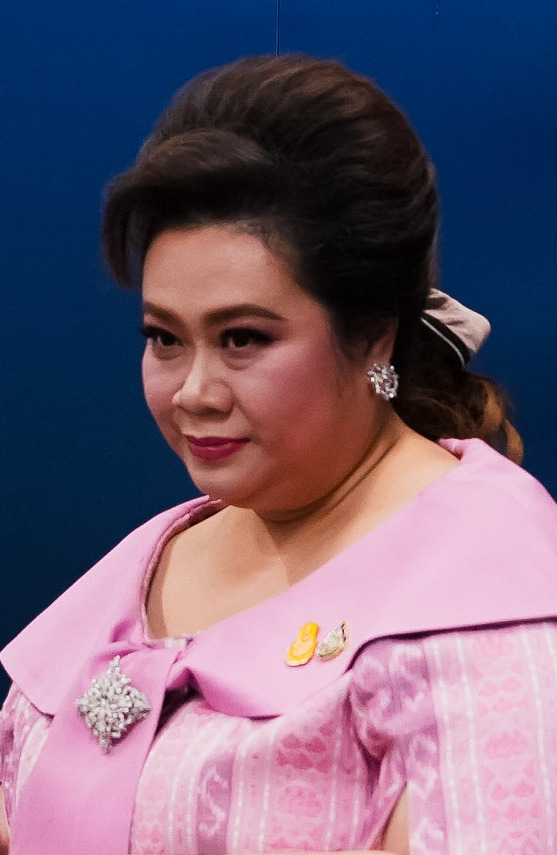
- Supamas in 2024

Minister of Office of the Prime Minister
- Incumbent
- Assumed office 19 September 2025
- Prime Minister: Anutin Charnvirakul

Minister of Higher Education, Science, Research and Innovation
- In office 1 September 2023 – 19 June 2025
- Prime Minister: Srettha Thavisin; Paetongtarn Shinawatra

Personal details
- Born: April 3, 1973 (age 53)
- Party: Bhumjaithai Party (2008–present)
- Other political affiliations: People's Power (2007–2008); Thai Rak Thai (2000–2007)
- Spouse: Lompan Pornthanprathet
- Education: Chulalongkorn University (BEng); University of Warwick (MEng)

Supamas Isarabhakdi (Thai: ศุภมาส อิศรภักดี, RTGS: Suphamat Itsaraphakdi; born 3 April 1973) is a Thai politician who served as Minister of Higher Education, Science, Research and Innovation from 2023 to 2025.

== Royal decorations ==
Supamas has received the following royal decorations in the Honours System of Thailand:

- 2020 - Knight Grand Cordon of the Most Exalted Order of the White Elephant
- 2008 - Knight Grand Cordon of The Most Noble Order of the Crown of Thailand
