= Thailand Institute of Scientific and Technological Research =

Scientific research institute of Thailand

Coordinates: 14.044282°N 100.718847°E

- Native name: สถาบันวิจัยวิทยาศาสตร์และเทคโนโลยีแห่งประเทศไทย
- Company type: State enterprise
- Industry: Scientific research institute
- Founded: 25 May 1963
- Headquarters: Khlong Luang, Pathum Thani, Thailand
- Area served: Thailand
- Key people: Chutima Eamchotchawalit (governor)
- Parent: Ministry of Higher Education, Science, Research and Innovation
- Website: Official website

Thailand Institute of Scientific and Technological Research (TISTR) (Thai: สถาบันวิจัยวิทยาศาสตร์และเทคโนโลยีแห่งประเทศไทย) is a scientific research institute of Thailand's Ministry of Higher Education, Science, Research and Innovation. Its headquarters is in Pathum Thani Province, Thailand.
