= Ministry of Digital Economy and Society =

Government ministry of Thailand

- กระทรวงดิจิทัลเพื่อเศรษฐกิจและสังคม
- Seal of Budha holding a scripture and a sword, with halo indicating wisdom

- Flag of Budha holding a scripture and a sword, with halo indicating wisdom

Ministry overview
- Formed: 16 September 2016; 9 years ago
- Preceding Ministry: Ministry of Information and Communication Technology (MICT)
- Jurisdiction: Government of Thailand
- Headquarters: Chaeng Watthana Government Complex, Building B, Chaeng Watthana Road, Lak Si, Bangkok
- Annual budget: 7,684 million baht (FY2017)
- Minister responsible: Chaichanok Chidchob, Minister
- Deputy Minister responsible: Boonthida Somchai, Deputy Minister
- Ministry executive: Wisit Wisitsora-At, Permanent Secretary
- Website: www.mdes.go.th

The Ministry of Digital Economy and Society (Abrv: MDES; Thai: กระทรวงดิจิทัลเพื่อเศรษฐกิจและสังคม, RTGS: Krasuang Dichithan Phuea Setthakit Lae Sangkhom), formerly known as the Ministry of Information and Communication Technology (MICT), Thai: กระทรวงเทคโนโลยีสารสนเทศและการสื่อสาร, is a cabinet ministry of Thailand. The MICT was established on 3 October 2002 by the Administrative Reorganisation Act, 2002. The new ministry was created as the Ministry of Digital Economy and Society by the Re-organization of Ministry, Bureau and Department Act, B.E. 2558.

== History ==
In September 2016, the Ministry of Information and Communication Technology (MICT) was dissolved and replaced by the Ministry of Digital Economy and Society. The ministry assumed the responsibilities of the MICT. The MICT's former agencies, the National Statistical Office of Thailand, the Thai Meteorological Department, the Electronic Transactions Development Agency, Thailand Post, TOT, and CAT Telecom, were transferred to the Ministry of Digital Economy and Society. The National Disaster Warning Center, formerly under the MICT, was transferred to the Interior Ministry. The MICT's Software Industry Promotion Agency (SIPA) was dissolved and some of its staff transferred to a newly established unit, the Digital Economy Promotion Agency under the MDES.

In 2018, the ministry announced plans to set up a cybersecurity agency and hacker training centre. It planned to recruit at least 1,000 trainers to educate people in 24,700 villages nationwide to use information communication technology (ICT) to construct "national broadband villages".

== Departments ==
=== Administration ===
- Office of the Minister
- Office of the Permanent Secretary

=== Dependent departments ===
- Thai Meteorological Department
- National Statistical Office of Thailand
- Office of the National Digital Economy and Society Commission
- Anti-Fake News Center

=== State Enterprise ===
- National Telecom Public Company Limited
- Thailand Post Company limited

=== Public organizations ===
- Electronic Transactions Development Agency (ETDA)
- Digital Economy Promotion Agency (DEPA)
- Office of the Personal Data Protection Commission (PDPC)
- Big Data Institute (BDI)
- Digital Government Development Agency (DGA)

== See also ==
- List of ministries of Thailand
- Censorship in Thailand
- Internet censorship and surveillance by country – Thailand
