= Ministry of Higher Education, Science, Research and Innovation =

Government ministry of Thailand

Ministry of Higher Education Science, Research and Innovation (กระทรวงการอุดมศึกษา วิทยาศาสตร์วิจัยและนวัตกรรม)
- กระทรวงวัฒนธรรม วิทยาศาสตร์ วัฒนธรรม
- Seal of vajra in front of an atom with four electrons (aspects of the ministry)

- Logo of the MHESI

Ministry overview
- Formed: 2 May 2019; 7 years ago
- Preceding Ministry: Ministry of Science and Technology; Office of the Higher Education Commission; National Research Council
- Jurisdiction: Government of Thailand
- Headquarters: Ratchathewi, Bangkok
- Annual budget: 14,885.4 million baht (FY2019)
- Minister responsible: Yodchanan Wongsawat, Minister
- Ministry executive: Supachai Pathumnakul, Permanent Secretary
- Website: www.mhesi.go.th

The Ministry of Higher Education, Science, Research and Innovation (Abrv: MHESI; Thai: กระทรวงการอุดมศึกษา วิทยาศาสตร์ วิจัยและนวัตกรรม, RTGS: Krasuang Kan Udommasueksa Witthayasat Wichai Lae Nawattakam), is a Thai government body responsible for the oversight of Higher education, research, and science and technology in Thailand.

== Background ==
Ministry of Higher Education, Science, Research and Innovation is a Thai government ministry created the Act of Ministries, Bureaus, and Departments Improvement (No. 19), 2562 BE (2019), which took effect 2 May 2019 during the administration of Prime Minister Prayut Chan-o-cha.

== Organization ==
=== Departments ===
- Office of the Minister
- Office of the Permanent Secretary
- Office of Atoms for Peace
- Department of Science Service (DSS)
- Office of the National Research Council of Thailand
- National Science and Technology Development Agency
- Thailand Science Research and Innovation

=== Supervised public organizations ===
- National Institute of Metrology
- Office of the National Policy Higher Education, Science, Research and Innovation Council
- Geo-Informatics and Space Technology Development Agency
- National Astronomical Research Institute of Thailand
- National Innovation Agency
- Thailand Institute of Nuclear Technology
- Synchrotron Light Research Institute
- Hydro and Agro Informatics Institute
- Thailand Center of Excellence for Life Sciences

=== State enterprises ===
- Thailand Institute of Scientific and Technological Research
- National Science Museum organisation

== List of ministers ==
The following is a list of Ministers of Higher Education, Science, Research and Innovation.

	Name	Took office	Left office	Cabinet
1	Suvit Maesincee	10 July 2019	15 July 2020	Second Prayut
2	Anek Laothamatas	5 August 2020	31 August 2023	Second Prayut
3	Supamas Isarabhakdi	1 September 2023	3 September 2024	Srettha
3	Supamas Isarabhakdi	3 September 2024	19 June 2025	Paetongtarn
4	Sudawan Wangsuphakijkosol	30 June 2025	18 September 2025	Paetongtarn
5	Surasak Phancharoenworakul	19 September 2025	30 March 2026	First Anutin
6	Yodchanan Wongsawat	30 March 2026	Incumbent	Second Anutin

== See also ==
- List of government ministries of Thailand
