= Ministry of Science, Technology and Environment (Thailand) =

The Ministry of Science, Technology and Environment (MoSTE) was a Thai government ministry from 1992 until 2002. With the coming into effect of the Restructuring of Government Agencies Act of 2002, the ministry was reorganized into the following separate ministries:

- Ministry of Science and Technology
- Ministry of Energy
- Ministry of Natural Resources and Environment

== See also ==
- List of government ministries of Thailand
