= Office of Atoms for Peace =

Thai nuclear research authority

- สำนักงานปรมาณูเพื่อสันติ

Department overview
- Formed: 1961
- Type: Ministerial department
- Jurisdiction: Government of Thailand
- Headquarters: Bangkok, Thailand
- Employees: 400
- Department executive: Associate Professor Pasit Lorterapong, Secretary-General
- Parent department: Ministry of Higher Education, Science, Research and Innovation
- Website: oap.go.th

The Office of Atoms for Peace (OAP) of Thailand (สำนักงานปรมาณูเพื่อสันติ) in Chatuchak district, Bangkok, Thailand, was established in 1961 as the Office of Atomic Energy for Peace. The OAP serves as the main authority for nuclear research in Thailand. The OAP employs approximately 400 people. The research topics and services provided at the OAP include radioisotope production, gamma radiography, neutron activation analysis, neutron radiography, and gemstone irradiation.

The OAP operated a 2-megawatt nuclear research reactor, Thai Research Reactor 1/Modification 1 (TRR-1/M1). The TRR-1/M1 is of the type TRIGA Mark III, built by General Atomics, and began operation in 1962 after being commissioned in 1961 as a 1MW reactor. The TRR-1/M1 underwent its modification during 1975-1977, at which point it began operation as a 2MW reactor. TRR-1/M1 is the only nuclear reactor in Thailand.

In 2006, OAP was divided into two separate entities: the original OAP, which will oversee nuclear and radiation regulations nationally, and the new Thailand Institute of Nuclear Technology (TINT), which will conduct peaceful nuclear research and offer services to the public.

== OAP functions ==
1. To be the Secretariat of the Atomic Energy for Peace Commission (AEC).
2. To regulate radiation safety, nuclear safety, and nuclear material.
3. To conduct research and development of nuclear technology.
4. To co-ordinate formulation of national policy and strategic plans on peaceful utilization of atomic energy.
5. To co-ordinate and carry out commitments and obligations with international organizations and with foreign institutes.
6. To co-ordinate and support national security relevant to atomic energy issues.
7. To co-ordinate and carry out technical co-operation with organizations in Thailand and abroad.
