= National Statistical Office (Thailand) =

Thailand government institution in charge of statistics and census data

- สำนักงานสถิติแห่งชาติ

Agency overview
- Headquarters: Bangkok, Thailand
- Agency executive: Piyanuch Wuttisorn, Director-General
- Parent agency: Ministry of Digital Economy and Society
- Website: nso.go.th

The National Statistical Office of Thailand (NSO) (Thai: สำนักงานสถิติแห่งชาติ; RTGS: samnak ngan sathiti haeng chat) is the government of Thailand's official statistics surveyor. It is an agency of the Ministry of Digital Economy and Society (MDES). One of its tasks is a nationwide census conducted every 10 years, the latest in 2010.

== Organization ==
TNSO has two main administrative branches, central and local, and several other administrative units apart from those two branches. The central administration oversees 11 smaller administrative units: Local administration is composed of 76 Provincial Statistical Offices. The NSO has two other administrative bodies: an Administrative Development Group (กลุ่มงานพัฒนาระบบบริหาร) and an Internal Audit Group (กลุ่มตรวจสอบภายใน).

== History ==
The predecessor of the National Statistical Office was established on 1 April 1915, by King Vajiravudh as the Department of Statistical Forecasting (กรมสถิติพยากรณ์), under the Ministry of Finance. In September 1915, King Vajiravudh expanded the department's responsibilities and renamed it the Department of Commerce and Statistical Forecasting (กรมพาณิชย์และสถิติพยากรณ์), still as part of the Ministry of Finance. The first Statistical Yearbook was published for the year 1916. The Ministry of Commerce was established in August 1920, and regulation over commerce was reassigned to it, with the newly renamed Department of Public Statistical Forecasting (กรมสถิติพยากรณ์สาธารณะ) under the new ministry. However, the statistics department was moved back under the Ministry of Finance in July 1921. In May 1933, the Department of Public Statistical Forecasting was once again reorganized under the Department of Commerce, Ministry of Finance, this time as a division (กอง), a lower administrative unit than a department, with its name changed to the Division of Statistical Forecasting Compilation (กองประมวลสถิติพยากรณ์).

In October 1935, the Division of Statistical Forecasting Compilation was moved under the jurisdiction of the Secretariat of the Cabinet, Office of the Prime Minister. The Statistics Prediction Act of B.E. 2479 (1936) (พระราชบัญญัติการสถิติพยากรณ์ พ.ศ. ๒๔๗๙) reorganized the duties and administration of the division. In May 1942, the division was reassigned to Department of Information under the Ministry of Commerce, but was moved back under the Secretariat of the Cabinet again in May 1943. With increases in the need for and use of official statistics, in February 1950 the Division of Statistical Forecasting Compilation was reassigned to the National Economic Council (สภาเศรษฐกิจแห่งชาติ), which at that time had the status of a subministry (ทบวง), not under any ministry, in order to allow for equal access to statistics-gathering services by all offices of the government. In December 1950, the division was expanded and renamed the Central Statistical Office (สำนักงานสถิติกลาง). The Statistics Act of B.E. 2495 (1952) (พระราชบัญญัติสถิติ พ.ศ. ๒๔๙๕) laid out the expanded authority and duties of the Central Statistical Office. These included administration of government statistics gathering, census-taking, as well as study, training, and research in the field of statistics.

In September 1959 the Office of the National Economic Development Council was established under the Office of the Prime Minister, and the Central Statistical Office was moved under its jurisdiction and further expanded. With its new authority, the Central Statistical Office took its first population census in 1960, which was Thailand's sixth population census. On 23 May 1963, the Central Statistical Office was upgraded to the National Statistical Office, now with departmental status (กรม), directly under the Office of the Prime Minister. This is considered the date of establishment of the modern NSO. The Statistics Act of B.E. 2508 (1965) (พระราชบัญญัติสถิติ พ.ศ. ๒๕๐๘) again redefined the authority and duties of the NSO.

== See also ==
- Office of the Prime Minister (Thailand)
