= Thailand Institute of Nuclear Technology =

Thai public organization

- สถาบันเทคโนโลยีนิวเคลียร์แห่งชาติ

Public organization overview
- Formed: 2006
- Type: Research institute
- Jurisdiction: Government of Thailand
- Headquarters: Bangkok, Thailand
- Public organization executive: Associate Professor Thawatchai Onjun, Executive Director
- Parent department: Ministry of Higher Education, Science, Research and Innovation
- Website: Official website

The Thailand Institute of Nuclear Technology (TINT) (สถาบันเทคโนโลยีนิวเคลียร์แห่งชาติ) is a public organization in Bangkok, Thailand.

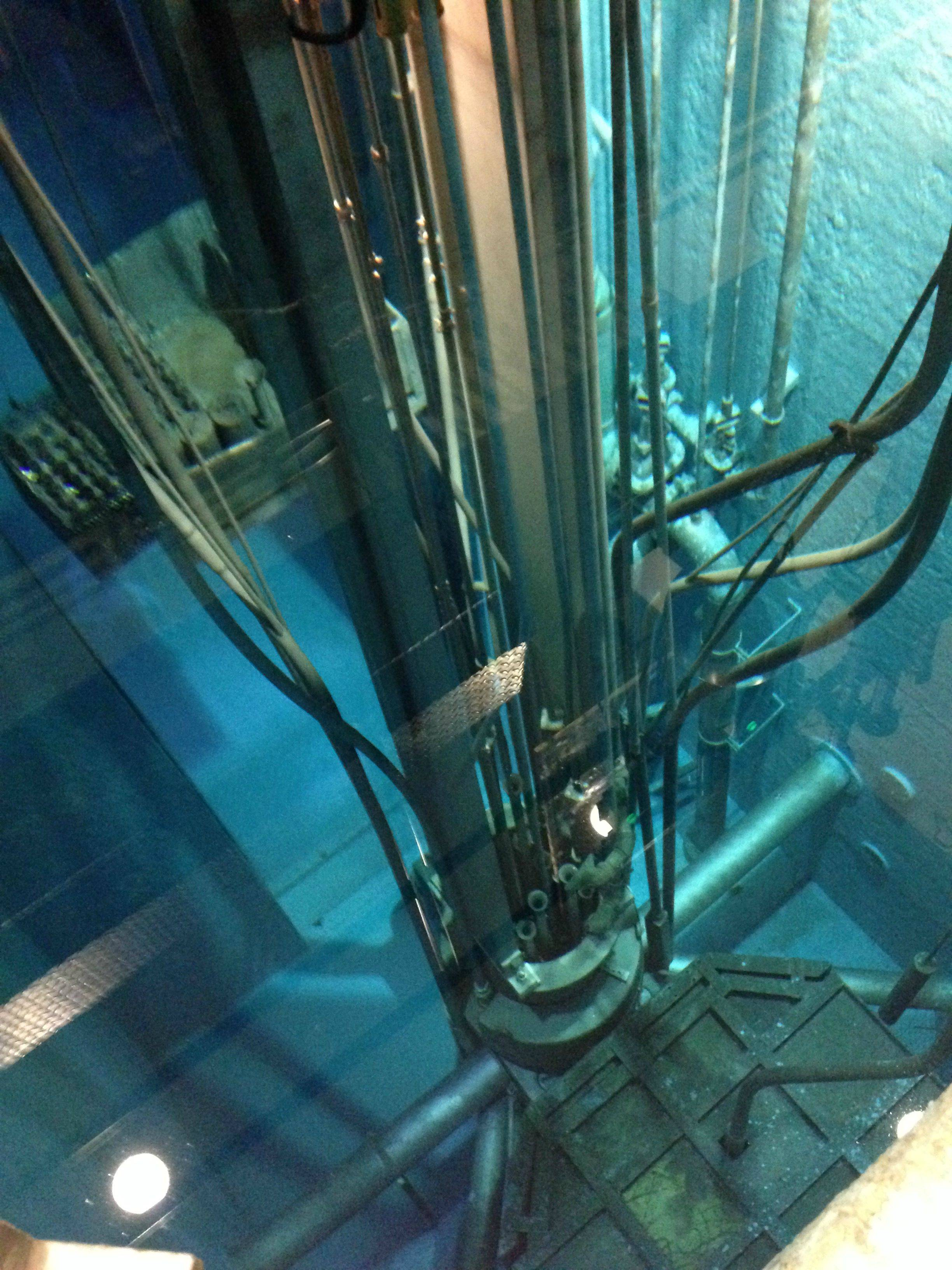
TRR1/M1 research reactor at the Thailand Institute of Nuclear Technology

== Overview ==
The institute is an entity established in December 2006 for national nuclear research and development. It is aimed to serve as the research body, cooperating with the Office of Atoms for Peace (OAP) who serves as the nuclear regulatory body of the country. TINT operates under Ministry of Higher Education, Science, Research and Innovation (MoST) and works closely with OAP and the International Atomic Energy Agency (IAEA).

Research programs:

1. Medical and Public Health
2. Agricultural
3. Material and Industrial
4. Environmental
5. Advanced Technology

Nuclear operations:

1. Safety
2. Nuclear Engineering
3. Reactor Operation
