= Electrical and Electronics Institute of Thailand =

Electrical and Electronics Institute
- Abbreviation: EEI
- Formation: 7 July 1998
- Founder: Government of Thailand
- Type: Not-for-profit
- Headquarters: 6th Floor, Department of Industrial Works Building, 57 Prasumen Road (Banglumphu), Pranakorn, Bangkok 10200
- Location: Thailand
- Coordinates: 13.745112°N 100.491077°E
- Leader: Mr.Narat Rujirat
- Board of directors: Executive Director
- Parent organization: Foundation for Industrial Development (FID)
- Affiliations: Ministry of Industry Network
- Website: www.thaieei.com

The Electrical and Electronics Institute (EEI) is a not-for-profit entity under the Foundation for Industrial Development (FID), which itself falls under the Ministry of Industry (Thailand).

== History and mission ==
The Electrical and Electronics Institute (EEI) was established on July 7, 1998. The EEI was set up as an autonomous body but is under the supervision of the Ministry of Industry of Thailand (MOI). It is operated as a non-profit organization and receives an investment grant from the Thai government each year.

The EEI was established to strengthen the competitiveness of the Thai electrical and electronics industry n international markets. It carries out its mission by coordinating between the private sector and the government. In addition to the MOI, it has shown to have working relationships with The Thai Industrial Standards Institute (TISI) (which transferred some of its activities to it in 1999), the Thailand Board of Investment (BOI) and The Ministry of Commerce (MOC).

In 2005 EEI was involved in the Capacity Building for a Recycling-Based Economy in APEC project. In this project they co-organized a symposium for APEC Capacity Building on a Recycling-based Economy: Guidelines for Thailand where EEI's director, Mr. Charuek Hengrasmee, gave a presentation on Current Status of Recycling in E&E Industry in Thailand.

It was reported on November 8, 2016 that the EEI, along with the 10 other independent organizations under the Ministry of Industry, were to be tasked to develop key Thai industries. This was part of the Ministry of Industry's proposed plan for a new venture capital fund to support startups and small and medium-sized enterprises (SMEs) in gaining access to funding.

In September 2020, the Bangkok Post reported that the EEI was jointly conducting a study with the Electricity Generating Authority of Thailand (EGAT), the Pollution Control Department, and the Federation of Thai Industries to create a business model for electronic waste management to better cope with the surge of hazardous rubbish in Thailand. The study is expected to take over a year, ending in November 2021.

== Activities ==
The EEI activities cover the following areas:

1. Safety testing of electrical and electronics products and parts based on TISI Standards
2. Compulsory standards testing required by TISI
3. Voluntary standards testing services to satisfy the demand from the private sector for export, import and manufacturing
4. CE-Marking Test according to EU Directive

The EEI also arranges mutual recognition agreements (MRA) on electrical and electronic products as well as proposes Thai national standards of electrical and electronics products through TISI.

The EEI also creates forecasts and other data related reports for Thailand's electrical and electronics (E&E) industry.

== Foundation for Industrial Development ==
EEI, along with seven sister institutes, falls under the oversight of the Foundation for Industrial Development (FID), which is sometimes referred to in translation as The Industrial Development Foundation. The Board of Directors of the FID provides oversight to the Board of Directors of the institute.

The other institutes under the FID are:

- Thai-German Institute (TGI)
- Thailand Textile Institute (THTI)
- National Food Institute (NFI)
- Management System Certification Institute (MASCI)
- Thailand Automotive Institute (TAI)
- Iron and Steel Institute of Thailand (ISIT)
- Plastics Institute of Thailand (PITH)

== Ministry of Industry Network ==
On 1 March 2019, the driving committee of the institutions under the Ministry of Industry aimed to create public awareness of its network of institutions. An Industry Network logo was created to be used in publicizing the mission of the institution networks as a symbol of their cooperation in driving Thailand's mission in the digital age. EEI is one of the institutes in this network and displays the symbol as one of its members.

== See also ==
- Cabinet of Thailand
- Economy of Thailand
- Federation of Thai Industries
- Government of Thailand
- List of Government Ministers of Thailand
