= Thailand Textile Institute =

Thailand Textile Institute (THTI)
- สถาบันพัฒนาอุตสาหกรรมสิ่งทอ
- Abbreviation: THTI
- Formation: October 15, 1996
- Founder: Government of Thailand
- Type: Not-for-profit
- Purpose: Support Thai textile industry
- Headquarters: Soi Trimit, Rama 4 Road, Phrakanong, Khlong Toei, Bangkok 10110
- Location: Thailand
- Coordinates: 13.719100°N 100.562260°E
- Leader: Mr. Pramode Vidtayasuk
- Board of directors: President
- Parent organization: Foundation for Industrial Development (FID)
- Affiliations: Ministry of Industry Network
- Website: www.thaitextile.org

Thailand Textile Institute (THTI; สถาบันพัฒนาอุตสาหกรรมสิ่งทอ) is a not-for-profit entity under the Foundation for Industrial Development (FID), which itself falls under the Ministry of Industry (Thailand).

== History, mission and activities ==
The Thailand Textile Institute was established on 15 October 1996. Their mission is to manage planning, development and support for the textile industry. THTI promotes the development of textiles and garments and helps business operators enhance their competitiveness. THTI also works with textile and clothing manufacturers to improve their design, management, and brand-name development and to establish relationships with foreign firms.

=== Representing Thailand and the Thai textile industry ===
THTI represents Thailand and the Thai textile industry at international events. Some events they have attended and their role:

Year	Event	Role
2005	APEC Seminar on Textile Trade under the World Trade Organisation (WTO) Legal Framework	Plenary Speaker; Mr. Virat Tandaechanurat, Executive Director
2005	Symposium - APEC Capacity Building on a Recycling-based Economy: Guidelines for Thailand	co-organizer and presenter

=== Thai textile industry statistics reporting ===
Some statistical reports are produced by the THTI. One report they produced was the Trend of Textile Export in 2005.A more recent example is the Thailand Textile Institute's (THTI's) 2010-2011 Thai Textile Statistics report which covers information on Thailand's textile industry such as its contribution to the country's GDP and amount and types of textiles produced. THTI also contributes to regional and international reporting and information sources such as the 2010 Guide to Investment Regimes of APEC Member Economies (7th Edition).

=== Organized competitions ===
THTI also is involved in textile design competitions. In 2015, THTI coordinated the SDC International Design Competition in Bangkok.

=== Projects and collaborations ===
THTI conducts collaborate work with universities and other organizations. Mr. Virat Tandaechanurat, THTI's former executive director, said that as part of the effort to boost the industry's success, in 2004 THTI launched the "Trendy Fabric Manufacturing by SMEs" project — aimed at improving the competitiveness and textile quality of smaller firms' and established clusters of factories to provide one-stop shopping for buyers. Virat also pointed to the Bangkok Fashion City project — a US $46 million undertaking to develop an international fashion school, textile and garment industry development programs, and fashion road shows — and the creation of the "Thai Textile Trend (T3) Style in Italy" brand, in conjunction with Italian fashion consultants.

In 2005 THTI was involved in the Capacity Building for a Recycling-Based Economy in APEC project. In this project they co-organized a symposium for APEC Capacity Building on a Recycling-based Economy: Guidelines for Thailand where THTI's director, Mr. Virat Tandaechanurat, gave a presentation on Current Status of Recycling in Textile Industry in Thailand.

Another project they participated in was a collaboration with Rajamangala University of Technology Thanyaburi (RMUTT) to develop green coconut fibers to produce textile products with special antibacterial features that suit the elderly.

It was reported on November 8, 2016, that THTI, along with the 10 other independent organizations under the Ministry of Industry, were to be tasked to develop key Thai industries. This was part of the Ministry of Industry's proposed plan for a new venture capital fund to support startups and small and medium-sized enterprises (SMEs) in gaining access to funding.

In 2017, THTI and 22 cloth producers collaborated in the Electricity Generating Authority of Thailand (EGAT) Energy Efficiency Label No. 5 program to develop clothes to reduce the use of electricity from ironing. They specifically joined in the Shirt No. 5 initiative that marked 24 years since this major national energy demand management program was initiated in 1993.

On 18 February 2020, THTI's Executive director Chanchai Sirikasemlert said that the institute recently arranged business meetings between hospitals and textile suppliers so the former can produce products that serve the specific needs of hospitals. The institute also collaborate with textile machinery manufacturers to help textile producers improve their capacity to produce material and fabric from farm products such as pineapple peels, banana peels and coconut husks.

== Executive Management ==
The executive management of THTI as of June, 2020 consists of:

- Executive Director - Dr. Chanchai Sirikasemlert
- Director of Industry Development Department - Ms. Suda Younghaipon
- Director of Textile Testing Center - Ms.Tipawan Panitchakran

== Foundation for Industrial Development ==
THTI, along with seven sister institutes, falls under the oversight of the Foundation for Industrial Development (FID), which is sometimes referred to in translation as The Industrial Development Foundation. The Board of Directors of the FID provides oversight to the Board of Directors of the institute.

The other institutes under the FID are:

- Thai-German Institute (TGI)
- National Food Institute (NFI)
- Management System Certification Institute (MASCI)
- Electrical and Electronics Institute (EEI)
- Thailand Automotive Institute (TAI)
- Iron and Steel Institute of Thailand (ISIT)
- Plastics Institute of Thailand (PITH)

== Ministry of Industry Network ==
On 1 March 2019, the driving committee of the institutions under the Ministry of Industry aimed to create public awareness of its network of institutions. An Industry Network logo was created to be used in publicizing the mission of the institution networks as a symbol of their cooperation in driving Thailand's mission in the digital age. THTI is one of the institutes in this network and displays the symbol as one of its members.

== See also ==
- Cabinet of Thailand
- Economy of Thailand
- Federation of Thai Industries
- Government of Thailand
- List of Government Ministers of Thailand
