= Plastics Institute of Thailand =

Institution to support Thai plactics industry

- Abbreviation: PITH
- Formation: November 16, 2010
- Founder: Government of Thailand
- Type: Not-for-profit
- Purpose: Support development of Thai plastics industry
- Headquarters: 86/6 Tri Mit Alley, Phra Khanong, Khlong Toei, Bangkok 10110
- Location: Thailand
- Coordinates: 13.708500°N 100.587390°E
- Leader: Mr. Siriruj Chulakaratana
- Board of directors: Chairman
- Parent organization: Foundation for Industrial Development (FID)
- Affiliations: Ministry of Industry Network
- Website: www.thaiplastics.org

Plastics Institute of Thailand (PITH) is a not-for-profit entity under the Foundation for Industrial Development (FID), which itself falls under the Ministry of Industry (Thailand).

== History ==
The Plastics Institute of Thailand was founded by resolution of Thailand's Ministry of Industry on November 16, 2010. It was given the mission of supporting the long-term development of the Thai plastics industry through a three prong strategy:
Strategy 1: Technology and management development
Strategy 2: Increasing marketing capabilities
Strategy 3: Creating a plastic industry database

On July 25, 2015, it was reported that PITH was ordered by the Ministry of Industry to work out details for the initial plan to use 10,000 tonnes of rice from government stockpiles to produce environmentally friendly bioplastic products to coincide with an initiative of the Prime Minister of Thailand General Prayut Chan-o-cha. This was to be completed by July 29, 2020.

It was reported on November 8, 2016, that PITH, along with the 10 other independent organizations under the Ministry of Industry, were to be tasked to develop key Thai industries. This was part of the Ministry of Industry's proposed plan for a new venture capital fund to support startups and small and medium-sized enterprises (SMEs) in gaining access to funding.

PITH is involved in the public and private effort to control plastic waste. PITH executive director Dr. Kriengsak Wongpromrat reported in a July 1, 2019 article on Thailand's plastic waste problem that the production capacity of plastic beads in Thailand will be flat, staying at 8 million tonnes from 2018 to 2019, because the government's policy is promoting lower use of some plastic products and outright banning others. "In the past, the plastics sector expanded 1-2% annually, but this trend is expected to become a contraction in the future," Kriengsak said. He went on to say other countries are also facing pressure to reduce plastic use as environmental concerns gain traction. "Plastic waste cannot be destroyed easily, so all authorities have to issue new policies to resolve the overwhelming waste problem," he said.

Kriengsak promoted the production of bioplastics in Thailand in an August 18, 2019 article. He stated that the strategy that he is trying to support is to convert bioresin made from sugar into finished and semi-finished plastic products. "We want to try to maximize the value chain of biopolymers but currently have to accept that Total Corbion is mainly exporting to EU and other countries,” he said. “The institute is working with small and medium-scale processors to support them in developing bioplastics conversion expertise. We’ve worked with 82 converters to date in developing products such as bags and thermoformed trays and bowls, but we need more to participate.”

== Activities ==
Some of the activities conducted by PITH are:

- Support technology and management development of the Thai plastics industry
- Support marketing of the Thai plastics industry
- Create and maintain a database of the Thai plastics industry
- Statistical gathering and reporting on the Thai plastics industry
- Supporting Thai government plastic waste management efforts
- Promoting the Thai plastics industry

== Foundation for Industrial Development ==
PITH, along with seven sister institutes, falls under the oversight of the Foundation for Industrial Development (FID), which is sometimes referred to in translation as The Industrial Development Foundation. The Board of Directors of the FID provides oversight to the Board of Directors of the institute.

The other institutes under the FID are:

- Thai-German Institute (TGI)
- Thailand Textile Institute (THTI)
- National Food Institute (NFI)
- Management System Certification Institute (MASCI)
- Electrical and Electronics Institute (EEI)
- Thailand Automotive Institute (TAI)
- Iron and Steel Institute of Thailand (ISIT)

== Ministry of Industry Network ==
On 1 March 2019, the driving committee of the institutions under the Ministry of Industry aimed to create public awareness of its network of institutions. An Industry Network logo was created to be used in publicizing the mission of the institution networks as a symbol of their cooperation in driving Thailand's mission in the digital age. PITH is one of the institutes in this network and displays the symbol as one of its members.

== See also ==
- Cabinet of Thailand
- Economy of Thailand
- Federation of Thai Industries
- Government of Thailand
- List of Government Ministers of Thailand
