= Iron and Steel Institute of Thailand =

- Abbreviation: ISIT
- Formation: November 2000
- Founder: Government of Thailand
- Type: Not-for-profit
- Headquarters: 75/6 RAMA 6 Thung Phaya Thai, Ratchatevee 10400
- Location: Thailand
- Coordinates: 13.7625°N 100.5280°E
- Leader: Mr.Anusorn Nuangpolmak
- Board of directors: Chairman
- Parent organization: Foundation for Industrial Development (FID)
- Affiliations: Ministry of Industry Network

The Iron and Steel Institute of Thailand (ISIT) is a not-for-profit entity under the Foundation for Industrial Development (FID), which itself falls under the Ministry of Industry (Thailand).

== History, mission and activities ==
The Iron and Steel Institute of Thailand (ISIT) was established as an independent body by Thailand's Ministry of Industry under the Foundation for Industrial Development (FID) in November 2000. Their mission is to enhance the strength of the Thai iron and steel industry by uniting efforts between the state and the private sector.

Some of the areas the ISIT has activities in are:

- Thai Iron and Steel Industry Data Reporting
- Accredited Laboratory Testing
- Advising the Thai government on trade issues and national planning
- Organizing and conducting professional industry symposiums

In 2013, ISIT and five other ASEAN regional iron and steel associations joined forces seeking a review in the Asean-China Free Trade Agreement (FTA) following the dramatic influx of steel products from China into Asean. The ISIT and the other association presidents brought up their concerns with their respective governments.

It was reported on November 8, 2016, that ISIT, along with the 10 other independent organizations under the Ministry of Industry, were to be tasked to develop key Thai industries. This was part of the Ministry of Industry's proposed plan for a new venture capital fund to support startups and small and medium-sized enterprises (SMEs) in gaining access to funding.

ISIT data on the Thai iron and steel industry is periodically cited in the news and other organization's reports. ISIT has also issued reports in the past such as the "Thailand Steel Industry 2017 and Outlook 2018".

In March 2018, ISIT participated in discussions with the Thai Department of Foreign Trade (DFT) in its request to exclude Thailand from US tariffs on steel and aluminum product imports.

On October 9, 2018, it was reported that the ISIT teamed up with the Federation of Thai Industries (FTI) club in calling on the Thai government to speed up new measures to protect local steel makers from Chinese steel dumping. Both parties agreed the government should accelerate the country's anti-dumping measures to protect the Thai steel industry.

== Foundation for Industrial Development ==
ISIT, along with seven sister institutes, falls under the oversight of the Foundation for Industrial Development (FID), which is sometimes referred to in translation as The Industrial Development Foundation. The Board of Directors of the FID provides oversight to the Board of Directors of the institute.

The other institutes under the FID are:

- Thai-German Institute (TGI)
- Thailand Textile Institute (THTI)
- National Food Institute (NFI)
- Management System Certification Institute (MASCI)
- Electrical and Electronics Institute (EEI)
- Thailand Automotive Institute (TAI)
- Plastics Institute of Thailand (PITH)

== Ministry of Industry Network ==
On 1 March 2019, the driving committee of the institutions under the Ministry of Industry aimed to create public awareness of its network of institutions. An Industry Network logo was created to be used in publicizing the mission of the institution networks as a symbol of their cooperation in driving Thailand's mission in the digital age. ISIT is one of the institutes in this network and displays the symbol as one of its members.

== See also ==
- Cabinet of Thailand
- Economy of Thailand
- Federation of Thai Industries
- Government of Thailand
- List of Government Ministers of Thailand
