= National Food Institute of Thailand =

Institution of the Government of Thailand

National Food Institute (NFI)
- Abbreviation: NFI
- Formation: 15 October 1996
- Founder: Government of Thailand
- Type: Not-for-profit
- Headquarters: No. 2008, Soi Arun Amarin 36. Bangyeekhan, Bang Phlad. Bangkok 10700
- Location: Thailand
- Coordinates: 13.768430°N 100.493540°E
- Leader: Dr. Atchaka Sibunruang
- Board of directors: Chairman
- Parent organization: Foundation for Industrial Development (FID)
- Affiliations: Ministry of Industry Network
- Website: www.nfi.or.th

The National Food Institute (NFI) is a not-for-profit entity under the Foundation for Industrial Development (FID), which itself falls under the Ministry of Industry (Thailand).

== History and mission ==
The National Food Institute (NFI) was established on October 15, 1996, by the Ministry of Thailand via cabinet resolution, order No. 440/2539 dated November 28, 1996. The NFI was founded to be an independent organization to promote and facilitate the development of Thailand's food industry.

NFI's stated mission is, "To provide academic and technical knowledge and updated information that can enhance food research and development within the government and the private sectors so as to boost the competitiveness of the food sector." They further state that they are "a core agency that provides both academic and technological services to create value of Thai food for the benefit for the country’s food industry development at the international level."

It was reported on November 8, 2016, that NFI, along with the 10 other independent organizations under the Ministry of Industry, were to be tasked to develop key Thai industries. This was part of the Ministry of Industry's proposed plan for a new venture capital fund to support startups and small and medium-sized enterprises (SMEs) in gaining access to funding.

In 2016, the NFI was also very active in promoting halal food certification to help the Thai food industry move into the Islamic food industry. The NFI president at the time, Yongvut Saovapruk, signed a memorandum of understanding (MOU) with officials from Japan Halal Development and Promotion, a government agency for boosting halal food standards in Japan and promoting Japanese food products in Muslim countries. Under the MOU, the NFI would assist Japanese investors to gain the official halal trademark from the Central Islamic Council of Thailand.

On August 8, 2019, the NFI signed a memorandum of understanding (MOU) with the Asian Institute of Technology (AIT) to conduct joint research and development and create a network of food researchers. The NFI also said that it would offer internship opportunities to AIT students and participate in the AIT Entrepreneurship Centre that would work with Thai small and medium-sized enterprises (SME).

In November 2019, it was reported that scientists from the NFI were working with scientists from the Technical University of Denmark's (DTU) and Aarhus University in Denmark and that they had developed a method to distill protein powder from grass matter, particularly ryegrass. The resulting human digestible powder has a similar amino acid profile to soy, eggs, and whey and can be used in a variety of food applications.

As of August 15, 2020, the NFI president was Mrs. Anong Paijiprapapon.

== Services and Programs ==
As of December, 2017, the NFI has services based on around three main missions:

1. To enhance competitive-edge and flexibility among Thai food entrepreneurs and to create a network of ‘Food Warriors’—new-generation of food entrepreneurs who will serve the industry in the future. The government will support development of expertise, marketing strategies, production & product development and marketing strategies.
2. To create infrastructure and enabling factors with the “World Food Valley Thailand” project to facilitate and encourage more investment from new food entrepreneurs in the form of private sector-state cooperation, leading to the future restructuring of the country's food industry.
3. To implement Future Food market development and enhance distribution channels at the international level, thereby enabling Thai SMEs to connect with the global food supply chain via a series of promotional activities, including World Food Expo, Window of Thai Food, National and Regional Food Festival. Also, virtual market development will be implemented to promote products and create awareness of Thai food in digital markets.

In addition to this they promote food innovation and food standards. They have used various names over the years for programs related to these goals such as "Thailand Food Forward" and "Authentic Thai Food for the World". These are all a part of their efforts towards making Thailand the "Kitchen of the World".

The NFI participates in some international food related research. In 2019, for example, NFI scientists worked with scientists from Denmark to develop a method to make grass protein digestible for humans. The NFI also makes forecasts about Thai food industry output. For example, they made the following forecast for 2020, "Prior to the COVID crisis, the National Food Institute estimated that the value of Thai food exports would be U.S. $34.9 billion in 2020, an increases of 5.4 percent from the previous year." As of August 15, 2020, NFI was working with the Board of Trade (BOT) of Thailand and the Federation of Thai Industries to make these forecasts.

== Foundation for Industrial Development ==
The NFI, along with seven sister institutes, falls under the oversight of the Foundation for Industrial Development (FID), which is sometimes referred to in translation as The Industrial Development Foundation. The Board of Directors of the FID provides oversight to the Board of Directors of the institute.

The other institutes under the FID are:

- Thai-German Institute (TGI)
- Thailand Textile Institute (THTI)
- Management System Certification Institute (MASCI)
- Electrical and Electronics Institute (EEI)
- Thailand Automotive Institute (TAI)
- Iron and Steel Institute of Thailand (ISIT)
- Plastics Institute of Thailand (PITH)

== Ministry of Industry Network ==
On 1 March 2019, the driving committee of the institutions under the Ministry of Industry aimed to create public awareness of its network of institutions. An Industry Network logo was created to be used in publicizing the mission of the institution networks as a symbol of their cooperation in driving Thailand's mission in the digital age. The NFI is one of the institutes in this network and displays the symbol as one of its members.

== See also ==
- Thai cuisine
- Cabinet of Thailand
- Economy of Thailand
- Federation of Thai Industries
- Government of Thailand
- List of Government Ministers of Thailand
