= Thailand Automotive Institute =

Non-profit in Thailand

- Abbreviation: TAI
- Formation: 7 July 1998
- Founder: Government of Thailand
- Type: Not-for-profit
- Headquarters: 655 soi 1, Bang Poo Industrial Estate, Moo 2, Sukhumvit Road, Km.34, Muang, Samutprakarn 1028
- Location: Thailand
- Coordinates: 15.512883°N 101.301707°E
- Services: Testing; consulting; certification; quality system auditing
- Leader: Anusorn Nuangpolmak
- Board of directors: President
- Parent organization: Foundation for Industrial Development (FID)
- Affiliations: Ministry of Industry Network
- Website: www.thaiauto.or.th

The Thailand Automotive Institute (TAI) is a not-for-profit entity under the Foundation for Industrial Development (FID), which itself falls under the Ministry of Industry (Thailand).

== History, mission and activities ==
The Thailand Automotive Institute (TAI) was established by cabinet resolution on July 7, 1998. The initiative to set up the TAI is attributed to having been driven by Nattapol Rangsitpol, one of the Thai government's officials most familiar with the Thai automotive industry and the director general of the Office of Industrial Economics (as of June, 2020). In 1998, Nattapol recalls, "The Department of Industrial Works was my first workplace in the position of engineer but in that period, the government planned to establish the TAI, separately as a new agency from the Thai Industrial Standards Institute (TISI), and I was assigned to draft the TAI's regulations and master plan for transport and environment in order to carry on the automotive policy in the country."

The mission of the TAI was to assist in the development and promotion of the Thai automotive industry so that it could better compete in the global market.

The stated vision of the TAI is (to be) "The leading organization of automotive and auto parts industry development with environmental-friendly business ecosystem and modernization". Their stated mission has five parts:

- To be knowledge center and expertise for automotive industry development
- To support operation of organizations in testing standard, inspection and innovation development
- To develop human resources in automotive, auto parts and related industry
- To expand research & development and enhance competence of entrepreneur for more productivity
- To collaborate among organizations in Thailand and international for automotive industry development

Some of the areas the TAI has activities in are:

- Engineering Development
- Thai Automotive Industry Data Reporting
- Training and Consulting
- Entrepreneur Development
- Organizing and conducting professional industry symposiums
- Thai Government Policy Proposals and Coordination

In 2005 TAI was involved in the Capacity Building for a Recycling-Based Economy in APEC project. In this project they co-organized a symposium for APEC Capacity Building on a Recycling-based Economy: Guidelines for Thailand where TAI's director, Mr. Vallop Tiasiri, gave a presentation on Overview of a Recycling-based Economy: System and Technologies in Automotive Sector in Thailand.

In December 2012, TAI issued their "Master Plan for Automotive Industry 2012 – 2016" report. This report looked back at the past six decades of the Thai automotive industry as well as made projections to the year 2050 to include looking at the Thailand automotive industry within the context of total ASEAN motor vehicle production.

It was reported on November 8, 2016, that TAI, along with the 10 other independent organizations under the Ministry of Industry, were to be tasked to develop key Thai industries. This was part of the Ministry of Industry's proposed plan for a new venture capital fund to support startups and small and medium-sized enterprises (SMEs) in gaining access to funding.

In 2018, TAI signed a letter of intent with Japan External Trade Organization (Jetro) for talks on next-generation vehicles to develop the EV industry in Thailand.

In early September 2019, TAI proposed a committee be established to drive the Thai government's electric vehicle (EV) scheme and increase sales as the market develops. The TAI stated it has a long-term roadmap for Thailand to become a production hub for EVs in Southeast Asia, with a goal to produce 2.5 million cars in 2030. Of the goal, 1.5 million cars are set for domestic sale.

=== Automotive testing, research and development center ===
TAI operates a testing research and development center which provides services and performs activities as follows:

- Testing services for national standardization and customer needs in the five categories:
  - Emission testing
  - Mechanical and tire testing
  - Environmental and corrosion testing
  - Chemical testing
  - Dimension measurement
- Engineering services - consulting services for testing and testing design
- International certification and homologation service
- Standard/Regulations support

== Foundation for Industrial Development ==
TAI, along with seven sister institutes, falls under the oversight of the Foundation for Industrial Development (FID), which is sometimes referred to in translation as The Industrial Development Foundation. The board of directors of the FID provides oversight to the board of directors of the institute.

The other institutes under the FID are:

- Thai-German Institute (TGI)
- Thailand Textile Institute (THTI)
- National Food Institute (NFI)
- Management System Certification Institute (MASCI)
- Electrical and Electronics Institute (EEI)
- Iron and Steel Institute of Thailand (ISIT)
- Plastics Institute of Thailand (PITH)

== Ministry of Industry Network ==
On 1 March 2019, the driving committee of the institutions under the Ministry of Industry aimed to create public awareness of its network of institutions. An Industry Network logo was created to be used in publicizing the mission of the institution networks as a symbol of their cooperation in driving Thailand's mission in the digital age. TAI is one of the institutes in this network and displays the symbol as one of its members.

== See also ==
- Cabinet of Thailand
- Economy of Thailand
- Federation of Thai Industries
- Government of Thailand
- List of Government Ministers of Thailand
