= Thai-German Institute =

Thai-German Institute (TGI)
- Abbreviation: TGI
- Formation: September 1992
- Founder: Government of Thailand
- Type: Not-for-profit
- Purpose: Technology transfer
- Headquarters: 700/1 Moo 1 Amata City Chonburi, Bangna-Trad(57 Km) Rd, Klongtamru, Muang Chonburi 20000
- Location: Thailand
- Coordinates: 13.449530°N 100.991730°E
- Services: Training; consulting; promotion
- Leader: Dr.Pasu Loharjun
- Board of directors: president
- Parent organization: Foundation for Industrial Development (FID)
- Affiliations: Ministry of Industry Network
- Website: www.tgi.or.th

The Thai-German Institute (TGI) is a not-for-profit entity under the Foundation for Industrial Development (FID), which itself falls under the Ministry of Industry (Thailand). The aim of the organization is to act as a training center for transferring advanced manufacturing technology to the Thai industry.

== History and mission ==
The Thai-German Institute was established by the Cabinet of Thailand in September, 1992. It was founded as a joint initiative of the Government of the Kingdom of Thailand and the Government of the Federal Republic of Germany. To stress its oriented-ness towards the industry, the TGI was set up as an autonomous body outside the formal education system with its operation under the supervision of the Foundation for Industrial Development and a broad oversight by the Ministry of Industry. TGI officially started operation in 1995, in a zone north of Bangkok, with the assistance of the German multinational company Festo. TGI was the largest joint-venture project in Thailand at the time. TGI's first training courses started in January 1998.

TGI embarked on a program to promote and educate Thailand's engineering industries in machine calibration and probing technologies in 2009. The aim of this effort was to help improve manufacturing processes and they enlisted the cooperation of British engineering company Renishaw to help with this endeavor by signing a Memorandum of understanding (MOU) with them.

In 2014, TGI started working with Thailand's Geo-Informatics and Space Technology Development Agency (GISTDA) and Taiwan's National Space Organization (NSPO) co-developed project WATER (Wise Antenna for Transmission Execution and Receiving System) to develop an S-BAND antenna to communicate with Thailand's Thaichote satellite.

It was reported on November 8, 2016 that TGI, along with the 10 other independent organizations under the Ministry of Industry, were to be tasked to develop key Thai industries. This was part of the Ministry of Industry's proposed plan for a new venture capital fund to support startups and small and medium-sized enterprises (SMEs) in gaining access to funding.

In 2017, TGI announced that in accordance with the government's Thailand 4.0 strategy, it would take on an important role in assisting in the upgrading of target industry productivity by enhancing technology, innovation, and human resources in the robotics and automation industry so that they will be capable and competitive in the Industry 4.0 era. TGI had researched and studied the needs of the Thai industrial sector over the past 20 years and had found a constant lack of human resources in Computer Numerical Control (CNC), Computer Aided Design (CAD), Computer Aided Manufacturing (CAM), Mould and Die and Automation.

In a 2019 TGI had become a unit operating under the CoRE (Center of Robotics Excellence). Its specific duties under CoRE included certifying and supporting entrepreneurs in the robotics and automation industry, developing commercial prototypes and training personnel for the robotics and automation industry.

It was officially noted in the summary of Thai cabinet resolutions on April 24, 2019 that TGI was part of meetings to determine how technology and innovation could be applied to both agricultural and industrial sectors.

== Services and training ==
TGI was initially setup mainly as a training institute. In the early 2000's, this was delivered by a Thai staff of around 90 people supplemented by five German technical specialists and one German co-director funded by GTZ.

The TGI offers short courses for further training of employees as well as specialized job-entry training according to a company's needs. They have been cited by national organizations for their low-cost advanced technical training. Part of the reason for the low cost of the training is that there are international funds, like the Japanese Miyazawa programme or fund, available to cover the costs of some training, with up to 70% of the course costs being subsidized.

Some of the types of training and services it offers:

- ‘tailor-made training’ for companies
- further training for vocational school teachers
- advisory and consulting services in technology and training
- joint projects
- high-tech product promotion
- machine time sharing

TGI training covers such technologies as:

- industrial automation technology
- process control
- industrial electronics
- programming and operation of Cumputer Numerical Control machines
- applications of Computer-aided design CAD and Computer-aided manufacturing (CAM)
- Plastic injection moulding
- Tool and Die Making
- Mould making
- Metrology

== Foundation for Industrial Development ==
TGI, along with seven sister institutes, falls under the oversight of the Foundation for Industrial Development (FID), which is sometimes referred to in translation as The Industrial Development Foundation. The Board of Directors of the FID provides oversight to the Board of Directors of the institute.

The other institutes under the FID are:

- Thailand Textile Institute (THTI)
- National Food Institute (NFI)
- Management System Certification Institute (MASCI)
- Electrical and Electronics Institute (EEI)
- Thailand Automotive Institute (TAI)
- Iron and Steel Institute of Thailand (ISIT)
- Plastics Institute of Thailand (PITH)

== Ministry of Industry Network ==
On 1 March 2019, the driving committee of the institutions under the Ministry of Industry aimed to create public awareness of its network of institutions. An Industry Network logo was created to be used in publicizing the mission of the institution networks as a symbol of their cooperation in driving Thailand’s mission in the digital age. TGI is one of the institutes in this network and displays the symbol as one of its members.

== See also ==
- Cabinet of Thailand
- Economy of Thailand
- Federation of Thai Industries
- Government of Thailand
- List of Government Ministers of Thailand
