= Leader of the Opposition (Thailand) =

Politician who leads the parliamentary opposition in Thailand

Leader of the Opposition in the House of Representatives
- ผู้นำฝ่ายค้านในสภาผู้แทนราษฎร
- Seal of the Parliament of Thailand

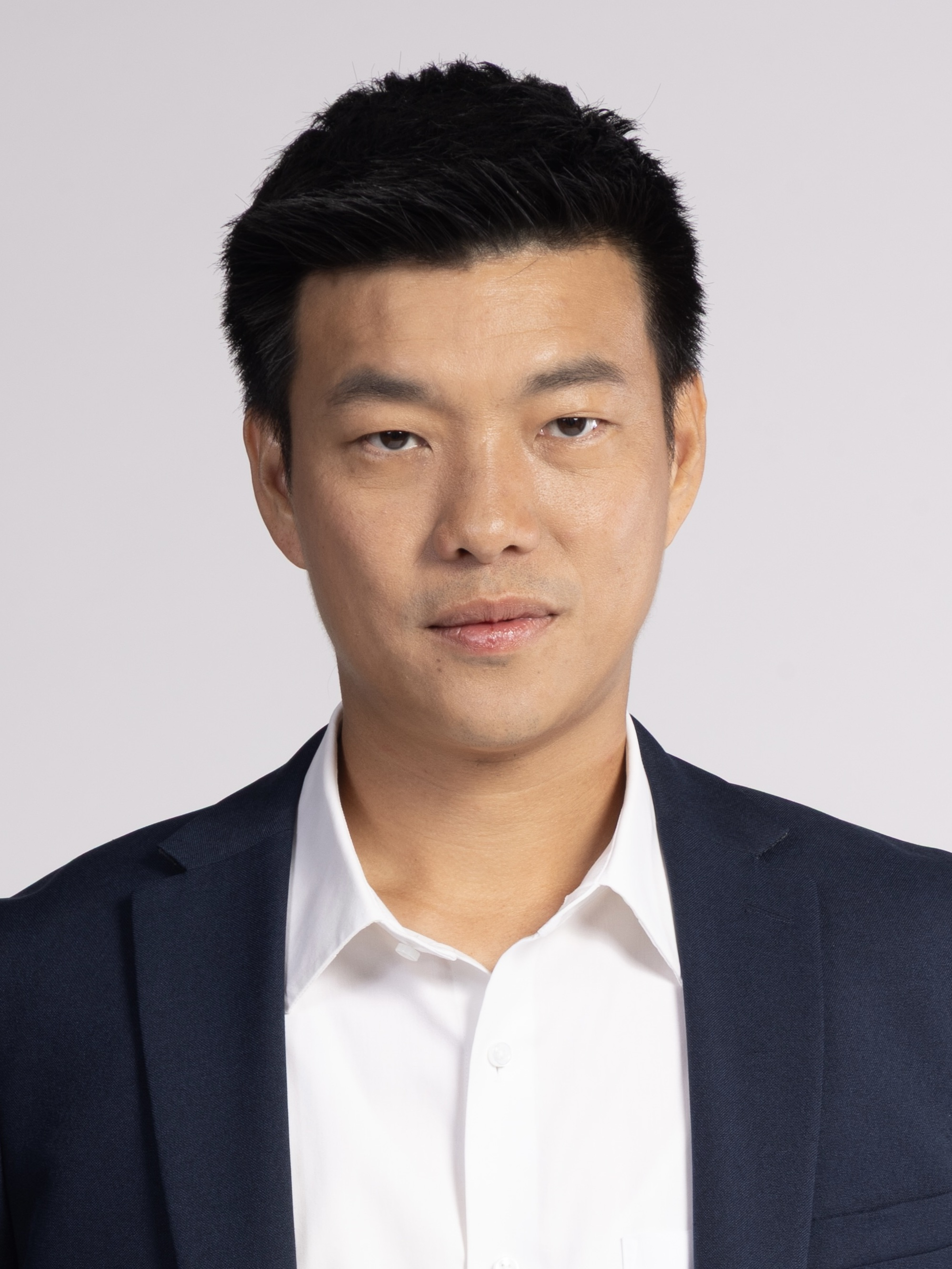
- Incumbent; Natthaphong Ruengpanyawut since 25 September 2024
- National Assembly
- Style: Leader of the Opposition
- Status: Leader of the Opposition
- Member of: House of Representatives
- Seat: Sappaya-Sapasathan
- Nominator: Speaker of the House of Representatives
- Appointer: Monarch by royal command
- Term length: While leader of the largest political party in the House of Representatives that is not in government, including speaker or deputy speaker of the House of Representatives and according to the term of the House of Representatives
- Constituting instrument: Constitution of Thailand
- Inaugural holder: Seni Pramoj
- Formation: 22 March 1975; 51 years ago
- Salary: ฿73,240 monthly

The Leader of the Opposition in the House of Representatives (Thai: ผู้นำฝ่ายค้านในสภาผู้แทนราษฎร; RTGS: Phu Nam Fai Khan Nai Sapha Phuthaen Ratsadon), more commonly described as the Leader of the Opposition, is the politician in the politics of Thailand who leads the main minority party in the House of Representatives. The Leader of the Opposition is the leader of the largest political party in the House of Representatives that is not in government and including of speaker or deputy speaker of the House of Representatives.

Following the Westminster-style parliamentary system, Thailand has had an official Leader of the Opposition since 1975. Under the 2017 Constitution the Leader of the Opposition was given an official role within the Thai political system. The constitution stipulates that the Leader of the Opposition must be selected after the Prime Minister and the Cabinet has taken office.

To be nominated as candidate one must be the leader of the largest political party with no member holding any ministerial positions and the member of the party do not hold the position of speaker or deputy speaker of the House of Representatives. The appointment will then be formalized by the King.

The Leader of the Opposition also an ex-officio member of several selection committees for: Constitutional Court Judges, Election Commissioners, Ombudsmen and commissioners of the National Anti-Corruption Commission and members of the State Audit Commission.

== List of Leaders of the Opposition ==
No.	Portrait	Name (Lifespan)	Term of office			Party	Ref.
No.	Portrait	Name (Lifespan)	Start	End	Duration	Party	Ref.
1		Mom Rajawongse; Seni Pramoj เสนีย์ ปราโมช (1905–1997)	22 March 1975	12 January 1976	296 days	Democrat	
2		Pramarn Adireksarn ประมาณ อดิเรกสาร (1913–2010)	24 May 1983	1 May 1986	2 years, 342 days	Thai Nation	
3		Chavalit Yongchaiyudh ชวลิต ยงใจยุทธ (born 1932)	15 May 1992	16 June 1992	32 days	New Aspiration	
(2)		Pramarn Adireksarn ประมาณ อดิเรกสาร (1913–2010)	30 October 1992	7 May 1994	1 year, 189 days	Thai Nation	
4		Banharn Silpa-archa บรรหาร ศิลปอาชา (1932–2016)	27 May 1994	19 May 1995	357 days	Thai Nation	
5		Chuan Leekpai ชวน หลีกภัย (born 1938)	4 August 1995	8 November 1997	2 years, 96 days	Democrat	
(3)		Chavalit Yongchaiyudh ชวลิต ยงใจยุทธ (born 1932)	26 November 1997	30 April 2000	2 years, 156 days	New Aspiration	
(5)		Chuan Leekpai ชวน หลีกภัย (born 1938)	11 March 2001	3 May 2003	2 years, 53 days	Democrat	
6		Banyat Bantadtan บัญญัติ บรรทัดฐาน (born 1942)	23 May 2003	5 January 2005	1 year, 227 days	Democrat	
7		Abhisit Vejjajiva อภิสิทธิ์ เวชชาชีวะ (born 1964)	23 April 2005	17 December 2008	3 years, 238 days	Democrat	
—		Chalerm Yubamrung (Note: De facto, as Floor Leader of the Pheu Thai Party in the House of Representatives.) เฉลิม อยู่บำรุง (born 1947); Acting Leader of the Opposition	12 January 2009	23 March 2011	2 years, 70 days	Pheu Thai	
—		Mingkwan Saengsuwan (Note: De facto) มิ่งขวัญ แสงสุวรรณ์ (born 1952); Acting Leader of the Opposition	23 March 2011	10 May 2011	48 days	Pheu Thai	
(7)		Abhisit Vejjajiva อภิสิทธิ์ เวชชาชีวะ (born 1964)	16 September 2011	8 December 2013	2 years, 83 days	Democrat	
8		Sompong Amornwiwat สมพงษ์ อมรวิวัฒน์ (born 1941)	17 August 2019	28 October 2021	2 years, 72 days	Pheu Thai	
9		Cholnan Srikaew ชลน่าน ศรีแก้ว (born 1961)	23 December 2021	20 March 2023	1 year, 87 days	Pheu Thai	
10		Chaithawat Tulathon ชัยธวัช ตุลาธน (born 1978)	17 December 2023	7 August 2024	234 days	Move Forward	
11		Natthaphong Ruengpanyawut ณัฐพงศ์ เรืองปัญญาวุฒิ (born 1987)	25 September 2024	Incumbent	2 years, 19 days	People's	

== See also ==
- Prime Minister of Thailand
- Shadow Cabinet of Thailand
- List of political parties in Thailand
- House of Representatives (Thailand)
