= Ministry of Industry (Thailand) =

Government ministry of Thailand

- กระทรวงอุตสาหกรรม
- Seal of Narayana Churning the Ocean of Milk by Prince Narisara Nuvadtivongs

- Flag of Narayana Churning the Ocean of Milk by Prince Narisara Nuvadtivongs

Ministry overview
- Formed: 5 May 1942; 84 years ago
- Jurisdiction: Government of Thailand
- Headquarters: Ratchathewi, Bangkok; 13.7641°N 100.5270°E
- Annual budget: 5,231.2 million baht (FY2019)
- Minister responsible: Varawut Silpa-archa, Minister
- Ministry executive: Nattapol Rangsitpol, Permanent Secretary
- Website: www.industry.go.th/en

The Ministry of Industry (Abrv: M-Industry;MIND Thai: กระทรวงอุตสาหกรรม, RTGS: Krasuang Utsahakam) is a cabinet ministry in the Government of Thailand. The ministry is responsible for the promotion and regulation of industries.

== History ==
The Ministry of Industry (MIND) began in 1933 as a division of the Thai government, the Industrial Division (Thai: กองอุตสาหกรรม), in the Department of Commerce (Thai: กรมพาณิชย์), ( now the Ministry of Commerce), which was part of the defunct Ministry of Economics (Thai: กระทรวงเศรษฐกิจ). In 1941, the division was upgraded to the Department of Industry (still in the Economic Ministry). On 5 May 1942, the Ministry of Industry was created in its own right.

== Budget ==
The ministry's fiscal year 2019 (FY2019) budget is 5,231.2 million baht, down from 5,653.7 million baht in FY2018.

== Ministry of Industry Network ==
On 1 March 2019, the driving committee of the institutions under the Ministry of Industry aimed to create public awareness of its network of institutions. An Industry Network logo was created to be used in publicizing the mission of the institution networks as a symbol of their cooperation in driving Thailand’s mission in the digital age.

== Departments ==
Organization of the MOI is based on information from the following sources:

- Ministry of Industry - Organization Chart

=== Administration ===
- Office of the Minister
- Office of the Permanent Secretary

=== Dependent departments ===
- Industry Economic Cluster
  - The Office of Industry Economics (OIE)
  - Office of Cane and Sugar Board (OCSB)
- Production Process Supervision Cluster
  - Department of Industry Works (DIW)
  - Department of Primary Industry and Mines (DPIM)
- Industry and Entrepreneurial Promotion CLuster
  - Department of Industry Promotion (DIP)
  - Thai Industry Standards Institute Office (TISI)

== State enterprises ==
- Industrial Estate Authority of Thailand

== Independent and autonomous organizations ==
The first institutes under the MOI were established in the 1970s under the Department of Industrial Promotion (DIP) and covered a few areas like textiles and metalworking. In the second half of the 1990s, these initial institutes were revamped with several of its divisions and centers being made autonomous, including the National Food Institute, the Thailand Textile Institute, the Electrical and Electronics Institute, and the Thai Productivity Institute, primarily through relocating some research and laboratory testing functions. These were established outside the bureaucratic structure to provide better support services that included training, consultancy, testing and laboratory services, and provision of market information. As autonomous institutes, they were able to provide better compensation to attract private sector managers and professionals and were also able to have more flexible budgetary arrangements. These autonomous institutes were given five years in which to become financially self-supporting.

- Foundation for Industrial Development (FID)
  - Thai-German Institute (TGI)
  - Thailand Textile Institute (THTI)
  - National Food Institute (NFI)
  - Management System Certification Institute (MASCI)
  - Electrical and Electronics Institute (EEI)
  - Thailand Automotive Institute (TAI)
  - Iron and Steel Institute of Thailand (ISIT)
  - Plastics Institute of Thailand (PITH)
- National Hazardous Substances Committee (NHSC)
- Thailand Productivity Institute
- The Institute for Small and Medium Enterprise Development (ISMED)
- ~~The Office of Small and Medium Enterprises Promotion (OSMEP)~~ (moved from under the MOI in 2014)

== Others ==
- General Environmental Conservation Public Company Limited
- Narai Phand Company Limited

== See also ==
- Cabinet of Thailand
- Economy of Thailand
- Federation of Thai Industries
- Government of Thailand
- List of Government Ministers of Thailand
