= Ministry of Justice (Thailand) =

Government ministry of Thailand

Coordinates: 13°54′15.29″N 100°31′47.43″E

- กระทรวงยุติธรรม
- Seal of the Scales of Justice by Prince Narisara Nuwattiwong

- Flag of the Scales of Justice by Prince Narisara Nuwattiwong

Ministry overview
- Formed: 25 March 1891; 135 years ago
- Jurisdiction: Government of Thailand
- Headquarters: 404, Chaengwatthana Rd., Lak Si, Bangkok
- Annual budget: 26,757 million baht (FY2020)
- Minister responsible: Police Major General Rutthaphon Naowarat, Minister of Justice
- Ministry executive: Pongsawat Nilayothin, Permanent Secretary
- Website: www.moj.go.th

The Ministry of Justice (Abrv: MOJ; Thai: กระทรวงยุติธรรม, RTGS: Krasuang Yutti Tham) is a cabinet ministry in the Government of Thailand. The ministry is in charge of the criminal justice system in the kingdom. As well as running prisons and aiding the Royal Thai Police, the ministry also runs the government's drug and narcotic control policies. The ministry is headed by the Minister of Justice, Tawee Sodsong. Its fiscal year 2020 budget is 26,757 million baht.

== History ==
The ministry was established in 1891 by King Chulalongkorn (Rama V). The monarch centralized the court and judicial system of the country. The sixteen courts were combined into seven courts. In 1912, under King Vajiravudh (Rama VI), the ministry was divided when the Court of Justice was given responsibilities over judicial affairs and the ministry retained responsibility for the legal and administrative areas.

In 1991, the National Assembly of Thailand passed the Improvement of Government Organisation Act. Article 21 of the act indicated the ministry was to be responsible for the administration of the Courts of Justice (except for adjudications and the criminal justice system.

== Departments ==
=== Administration ===
- Office of the Minister's Secretary
- Office of the Inspector General
- Office of the Auditor
- Office of the Permanent Secretary
- Office of the Justice Affairs
- Department of Special Investigation
- Central Institute of Forensic Science
- Rights and Liberties Protection Department
- Legal Execution Department
- Department of Juvenile Observation and Protection
- Department of Corrections
- Department of Probation
- Office of the Narcotics Control Board (ONCB)

=== Public organizations ===
- Thailand Institute of Justice
- Thailand Arbitration Center

=== Department directly under the justice minister ===
- Office of the Public Sector Anti-Corruption Commission (PACC)

== See also ==
- Cabinet of Thailand
- Government of Thailand
- Justice ministry
- Law of Thailand
- List of Government Ministers of Thailand
- Politics of Thailand
- รัฐมนตรีว่าการกระทรวงยุติธรรมของไทย (Thai Minister of Justice)
