= Board of Investment =

Board of Investment or Board of Investments may refer to:

- Board of Investment (Mauritius), the investment promotion agency of Mauritius
- Board of Investment (Sri Lanka), the investment promotion agency of Sri Lanka
- Board of Investments (Philippines), the investment promotion agency of the Philippines
- Thailand Board of Investment, the investment promotion agency of Thailand
- Pakistan Board of Investment, the investment promotion agency of Pakistan
