= EDB =

EDB may refer to:

Organizations:

- Economic Development Board of the Government of Singapore
- Economic Development Board (South Australia)
- EDB Business Partner, a Norwegian IT services company
- Education Bureau, a policy bureau in Hong Kong
- Electricity Distribution Business
- EnterpriseDB, an American software company
- Entschädigungseinrichtung deutscher Banken
- Eurasian Development Bank, a regional development bank created by Russia and Kazakhstan

Other:

- Edinburgh Waverley railway station, in Scotland
- Electrodynamic bearing
- Energy Science and Technology Database, maintained by the United States Department of Energy
- Estradiol dibenzoate, an estrogen ester
- Ethylene dibromide
- Extensor digitorum brevis muscle
- External data bus: The primary data highway of all computers. Everything in a computer is tied either directly or indirectly to the external data bus.
- EURING Databank, the European database for bird ringing data.

== See also ==
- Economic Development Board (disambiguation)
