= Economic Development Board (disambiguation) =

Economic Development Board is a Singapore government investment promotion agency, promoting investment in Singapore.

It may also refer to other agencies, named as such, promoting investment in their respective country, state, region or city:

- Economic Development Board (Mauritius) - Mauritius government agency
- Economic Development Board (South Australia) - defunct South Australia regional agency

There are also agencies, similarly named, with investment promotion as part of their mission:

- National Economic and Development Authority - Philippine government agency
- Office of the National Economic and Social Development Council - Thailand government agency
- Rwanda Development Board - Rwanda government agency
