= Office of the Prime Minister (Thailand) =

Government organization in Thailand

- สำนักนายกรัฐมนตรี

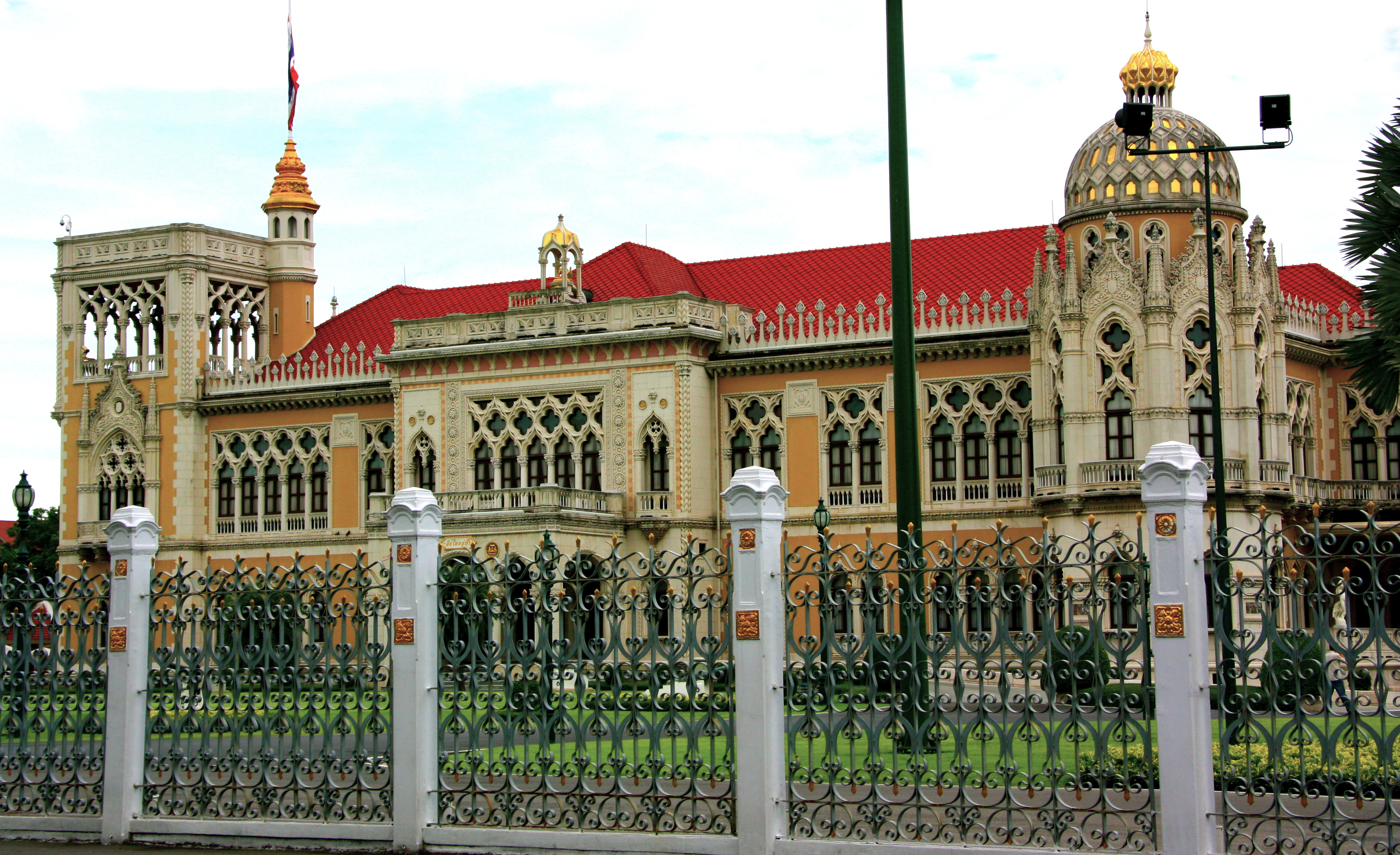
- Government House

Ministry overview
- Formed: 9 December 1933; 92 years ago
- Jurisdiction: Government of Thailand
- Headquarters: Government House, Dusit, Bangkok; 13°45′46.58″N 100°30′43.63″E
- Annual budget: 41,216.2 million baht (FY2019)
- Ministers responsible: Supamas Isarabhakdi, Minister; Napinthorn Srisanpang, Minister; Paradorn Prissananantakul, Minister; Suksomruay Wantaneeakul, Minister
- Ministry executive: Yupa Thaveewatnakitvon, Permanent Secretary
- Website: Official website

The Office of the Prime Minister (Abrv: OPM; Thai: สำนักนายกรัฐมนตรี, RTGS: Samnak Nayok Ratthamontri) is the central executive agency in the Government of the Kingdom of Thailand. It is classified as a cabinet department and is led by a permanent secretary. Its main responsibility is to assist the Prime Minister of Thailand in the role of head of government and chair of the Cabinet of Thailand.

== Function ==
As the central executive agency, the Office of the Prime Minister is in charge of the coordination and management of the executive branch of the government of Thailand. It assists prime ministers in the execution of their duties and helps them manage and formulate policies. It also acts as the cabinet office, recording and assisting the cabinet as a central functioning organ of the government. The prime minister must appoint a permanent secretary in charge, who is also a member of the cabinet, to oversee its operations. It also houses the offices of the various deputy prime ministers of Thailand. The office is located in the Government House Complex, in Dusit, Bangkok.

In late 2016, the OPM acquired an additional function: as a "holding pen" for government officials accused of corruption. Former Prime Minister Prayut Chan-o-cha invoked his special powers under Section 44 of the interim charter to create 50 posts at the OPM for civil servants being investigated for alleged wrongdoing. Transferred officials will continue to receive their salaries.

== Budget ==
The OPM budget for fiscal year 2019 (FY2019) (1 October 2018–30 September 2019) is 41.216.2 million baht. Its budget was 36,001.3 million baht in FY2016, 35,412.3 million baht in FY2017, and 34,256.5 million baht in FY2018.

== Departments ==
=== Departments ===
- Office of the Permanent Secretary
- The Government Public Relations Department (PRD)
- The Office of the Consumer Protection Board

=== Agencies directly under the Prime Minister ===
For list, see Thailand's Budget in Brief Fiscal Year 2019.

- Secretariat of the Prime Minister
- Secretariat of the Cabinet
  - National Reconciliation Commission
  - Royal Gazette
- Office of the National Security Council (NSC)
- National Intelligence Agency (NIA)
- Budget Bureau
- Office of the Council of State
- Office of the Civil Service Commission
- Office of the National Economic and Social Development Council
- Office of Public Sector Development Commission
- Office of the Board of Investment (BOI)
- Office of the National Water Resources (ONWR)
- Office of the National Land Policy
- National Cyber Security Agency (NCSA)

=== Regulatory agencies under the Office of the Prime Minister ===
- Internal Security Operations Command (ISOC)
- Maritime Enforcement Command Center (MECC)
- Southern Border Provinces Administration Centre (SBPAC)

=== State enterprises ===
- MCOT Public Company Limited (Formerly known as Mass Communications Organization of Thailand)

=== Agencies or departments under the Prime Minister's command ===
- National Office of Buddhism
- Office of the Royal Development Projects Board
- Royal Society of Thailand
- Royal Thai Police
- Anti-Money Laundering Office
- Office of Public Sector Anti-Corruption Commission
- National Village and Urban Community Fund Office
- Office of Thai Health Promotion Foundation
- Equitable Education Fund
- Eastern Special Development Zone Policy Office
- Strategic Transformation Office (STO)

== Public organisations ==
- Designated Areas for Sustainable Tourism Administration
- The Office for National Education Standards and Quality Assessment
- Office of Knowledge Management and Development
- Pinkanakorn Development Agency
- Thai Public Broadcasting Service (TPBS)
- Thailand Convention and Exhibition Bureau (TCEB)
- Thailand Professional Qualification Institute
- The Thailand Research Fund
- The Office of Small and Medium Enterprises Promotion (OSMEP)

== See also ==
- Prime Minister of Thailand
- Cabinet of Thailand
- List of Government Ministers of Thailand
- Government of Thailand
