= Industrial Estate Authority of Thailand =

State-owned industry group in Thailand

The Industrial Estate Authority of Thailand (I-EA-T), (Thai: การนิคมอุตสาหกรรมแห่งประเทศไทย) is a state enterprise under control of the Ministry of Industry of Thailand. It was established by the Declaration of the Revolutionary Council No. 339 in 1972. The responsibilities of the authority are to create and organize industrial estates, grouping together industrial facilities in a synergistic manner. The authority also has the responsibility of decentralization of industrial activity away from the capital to outlying provinces of Thailand. The authority is active in fields of environmental issues, workplace safety, land use, insurance, import and export management and promotion, and factory-related infrastructure development such as water supply, electricity distribution, telephony, shopping, housing, and roads.

As of May 2021, there were 62 industrial estates in operation across 16 provinces, of which 12 are operated by I-EA-T and 50 are jointly operated with developers. I-EA-T claims they employ 605,234 workers.

In 2024 Yuthasak Supasorn is president of Industrial Estate Authority of Thailand

== Role and responsibilities ==
As a state enterprise under the Ministry of Industry, the Industrial Estate Authority of Thailand is responsible for the development and establishment of industrial estates, where factories for various industries are systematically clustered together. With industrial estates as an implementation tool, I-EA-T also serves as a governmental mechanism to decentralize industrial development to provincial areas throughout the country.
