= Napinthorn Srisanpang =

Thai politician

- นภินทร ศรีสรรพางค์
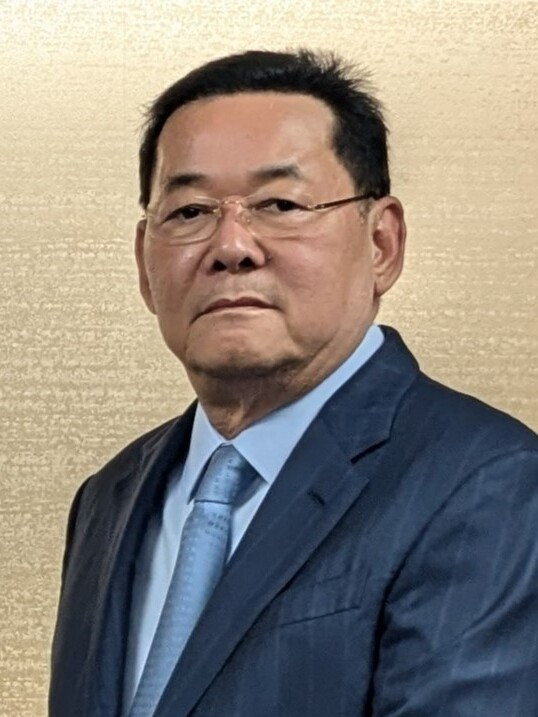
- Napinthorn in 2024

Minister of Office of the Prime Minister
- Incumbent
- Assumed office 19 September 2025
- Prime Minister: Anutin Charnvirakul

Deputy Minister of Commerce
- In office 1 September 2023 – 19 June 2025 Serving with Suchart Chomklin
- Prime Minister: Srettha Thavisin; Paetongtarn Shinawatra
- Minister: Phumtham Wechayachai; Pichai Naripthaphan

Personal details
- Born: 30 May 1959 (age 67) Ban Pong district, Ratchaburi province, Thailand
- Party: Bhumjaithai (since 2018)
- Other political affiliations: Pheu Thai (2008–2018)
- Spouse: Veena Srisanpang (m. 1991)
- Children: 1
- Profession: Politician

Napinthorn Srisanpang (Thai: นภินทร ศรีสรรพางค์, RTGS: Naphinthon Sisanphang) is a Thai politician who served as Deputy Minister of Commerce from 2023 to 2025. A member of the Bhumjaithai Party, he previously served as a senator from 2000 to 2006, representing Ratchaburi.

== Royal decorations ==
Napinthorn has received the following royal decorations in the Honours System of Thailand:

- 2011 - Knight Grand Cordon of the Most Exalted Order of the White Elephant
- 2005 - Knight Grand Cordon of The Most Noble Order of the Crown of Thailand
