= Shadow Cabinet of Thailand =

Unofficial opposition cabinet of Thailand

The Shadow Cabinet of Thailand (Thai: คณะรัฐมนตรีเงา or รัฐบาลเงา) is an unofficial group of senior opposition party's spokespeople who form an alternative cabinet to the government. The shadow cabinet members shadow or mark each individual member of the government. Although the Leader of the Opposition is an officially appointed position, the shadow cabinet currently bears no legal status. As of 2026, shadow cabinets have only been formed three times, two times by the Democrat Party after the 2007 general election and 2011 general election, and once by the People's Party after the 2026 general election.

After the People's Power Party's victory in the 2007 general election, the Democrat Party became the sole official opposition party. Abhisit Vejjajiva, leader of the Democrat Party, expressed his intention to set up a shadow cabinet to track the new administration's performance, to propose better solutions, and to provide the Democrat's standpoint on each government decision. The shadow cabinet line-up was announced on February 8, 2008, after the Samak's administration had officially assumed office. On 15 December 2008, Abhisit was elected by the House of Representatives to become the next Prime Minister, with many of the members of his new cabinet drawn from the shadow cabinet. A day later, the main opposition Pheu Thai Party MP Jatuporn Prompan stated that his party would not be forming a shadow cabinet.

After the 2011 elections, the Pheu Thai Party won the election under the leadership of Yingluck Shinawatra, and the Democrat Party was once again the main opposition party with Abhisit as its leader, which led to the formation of a second shadow cabinet by Abhisit.

== Members ==
Abhisit Vejjajiva's 2nd shadow cabinet, active from 6 September 2011 - 7 May 2014.

Ministry	Shadow Minister	Shadow Deputy Minister
Leader of the Opposition	Abhisit Vejjajiva	
Shadow Deputy Prime Minister	Korn Chatikavanij; Chamni Sakdiset; Kasit Piromya; Kiat Sittheeamorn	
Shadow Minister to the Office of the Prime Minister	Thepthai Senapong; Peerapan Saleeratthavipak; Sathit Pitutecha	
Shadow Minister of Defence	Abhisit Vejjajiva	
Shadow Minister of Finance	Juti Krairiksh	Sansern Samalapa
Shadow Minister of Interior	Suthep Thaugsuban	Nipit Intarasombat; Che-aming Tohtayong
Shadow Minister of Transport	Vitoon Nambutr	Samart Ratchapolsitte
Shadow Minister of Tourism and Sports	Anchalee Wanit Teppabut	Naraphat Kaewthong
Shadow Minister of Social Development and Human Security	Issara Somchai	
Shadow Minister of Foreign Affairs	Ong-Art Klampaiboon	
Shadow Minister of Justice	Thaworn Senniam	
Shadow Minister of Agriculture and Cooperatives	Chinnaworn Boonyakiat	Wirat Romyen; Nipon Boonyamanee
Shadow Minister of Public Health	Witthaya Kaewparadai	
Shadow Minister of Digital Economy and Society	Sirichok Sopha	
Shadow Minister of Science and Technology	Kalaya Sophonpanich	
Shadow Minister of Natural Resource and Environment	Sathit Wongnongtoey	
Shadow Minister of Energy	Alongkorn Pollabutr	Chalermchai Sri-on
Shadow Minister of Commerce	Apirak Kosayodhin	Warong Dechgitvigrom
Shadow Minister of Culture	Teera Slukpetch	
Shadow Minister of Education	Kanok Wongtrangan	Siriwan Pratsajaksatru
Shadow Minister of Industry	Chaiwut Bannawat	
Shadow Secretariat of the Prime Minister	Jurin Laksanawisit	Buranat Samutarak
Shadow Spokesperson	Attawit Suwanpakdee	Rachada Dhanadirek

== See also ==
- Shadow Cabinet
- Cabinet of Thailand
- Leader of the Opposition (Thailand)
