= Bangkok Fashion City =

Bangkok Fashion City was a campaign under the Ministry of Industry of Thailand. This 1.8-billion-baht program's purpose was to establish Bangkok as a regional fashion hub and eventually as a world fashion leader on the level of New York, Paris, and Milan. The project was initiated by the Thaksin administration in 2003. It was scrapped in 2006.
