= Office of the National Economic and Social Development Council =

- สำนักงานสภาพัฒนาการเศรษฐกิจและสังคมแห่งชาติ

Agency overview
- Formed: 1972
- Preceding agencies: National Economic Council (NEC) (1950); National Economic Development Council (NEDC) (1959); National Economic and Social Development Board (NESDB) (1972)
- Headquarters: Bangkok, Thailand
- Annual budget: 609.7 million baht (FY2019)
- Agency executives: Sanit Aksornkoae, Chairman; Danucha Pichayanan, Secretary-General
- Parent agency: Office of the Prime Minister
- Website: Official website

The Office of the National Economic and Social Development Council (Thai: สำนักงานสภาพัฒนาการเศรษฐกิจและสังคมแห่งชาติ), also known as NESDC (Thai: สภาพัฒน์), is a national economic planning agency of Thailand. It is a government department reporting directly to the Office of the Prime Minister. The NESDC maintains four regional offices in Chiang Mai, Khon Kaen, Songkhla, and Nonthaburi. Sanit Aksornkoae, Chairman of the NESDC, stated that in 2018 the Office of the National Economic and Social Development Board (NESDB) underwent a major revamp, including being officially renamed the NESDC. Its FY2019 budget is 609.7 million baht.

== History ==
=== Background ===
- Established on 15 February 1950 as the National Economic Council (NEC).
- Renamed the Office of the National Economic Development Board (NEDB) in 1959.
- Launched the first National Economic Development Plan in 1961.
- Reformed as the National Economic and Social Development Board (NESDB) in 1972, under the Prime Minister's Office.
- Reformed as the National Economic and Social Development Council (NESDC) in 2018, under the Prime Minister's Office.

=== Mission ===
NESDC is Thailand's central planning agency responsible for crafting strategies for balanced and sustainable development in the national interest.

=== Key functions ===
- Formulate the five-year National Economic and Social Development Plan. The current plan is The Twelfth National Economic and Social Development Plan, 2017–2021. The aims of the Twelfth Plan are consistent with the targets of the 20-year national strategy (2017–2036).
- Pursue four national agendas:
  1. Alleviate poverty and income distribution imbalances
  2. Enhance Thailand's competitiveness
  3. Promote social capital development
  4. Promote sustainable development
- Formulate strategies for key government policies and major development projects
- Analyze budget proposals by state-owned enterprises and related agencies
- Create an economic intelligence database, especially for GDP data
- Develop development indicators

== Organizational structure ==
The NESDC is composed of two main components:

=== NESDC board ===
- Composed of 23 members; (1) Permanent Secretary of the Ministry of Finance, (2) Secretary General of the Office of the Council of State, (3) Secretary-General of the Office of the Civil Service Commission, (4) Secretary-General of the Office of the Public Sector Development Commission, (5) Secretary-General of the National Security Council, (6) Director of the Budget Bureau, (7) Governor of the Bank of Thailand and (8) Secretary-General of the National Economic and Social Development Council. There are also 15 qualified members, appointed from among persons with knowledge, expertise, or experience in economics and society, as proposed by the Cabinet, to serve for four-year terms.
- Provides recommendations and comments on national economic and social development to the prime minister and cabinet.
- Coordinates NESDC efforts and those of related government agencies and state enterprises to formulate plans, development projects, and implementation plans.

=== Office of the NESDC ===
- Divided into 13 offices and two divisions.
- Headed by the chairman and secretary-general.
- Accommodates key development variables, notably the move towards a knowledge-based economy, civil service reforms, and good governance.

== See also ==
- Office of the Prime Minister (Thailand)
- Prime Minister of Thailand
