= Economic Development Board (Mauritius) =

Investment promotion agency of Mauritius

Economic Development Board (EDB)

Agency overview
- Jurisdiction: Government of Mauritius
- Headquarters: Port Louis, Mauritius; 20°9′55.61″S 57°30′21.04″E
- Minister responsible: Ministry of Finance and Economic Development
- Agency executive: Ken Poonoosamy, Managing Director
- Website: www.edbmauritius.org

The Economic Development Board (EDB) is the national investment promotion agency of the Government of Mauritius with the mandate to promote and facilitate investment in the country. It is the first point of contact for investors exploring business opportunities in Mauritius and the region. EDB also assists investors in the growth, nurturing and diversification of their business.

With a view to facilitating the implementation of investment projects and, more importantly, to continuously improve the investment and business climate, EDB works in close collaboration with Government bodies, institutions and private sector companies. EDB has an important role of policy advocacy to continuously improve the competitiveness of Mauritius and accompanies investors looking at opportunities in Africa.
