= Paradorn Prissananantakul =

Thai politician (born 1979)

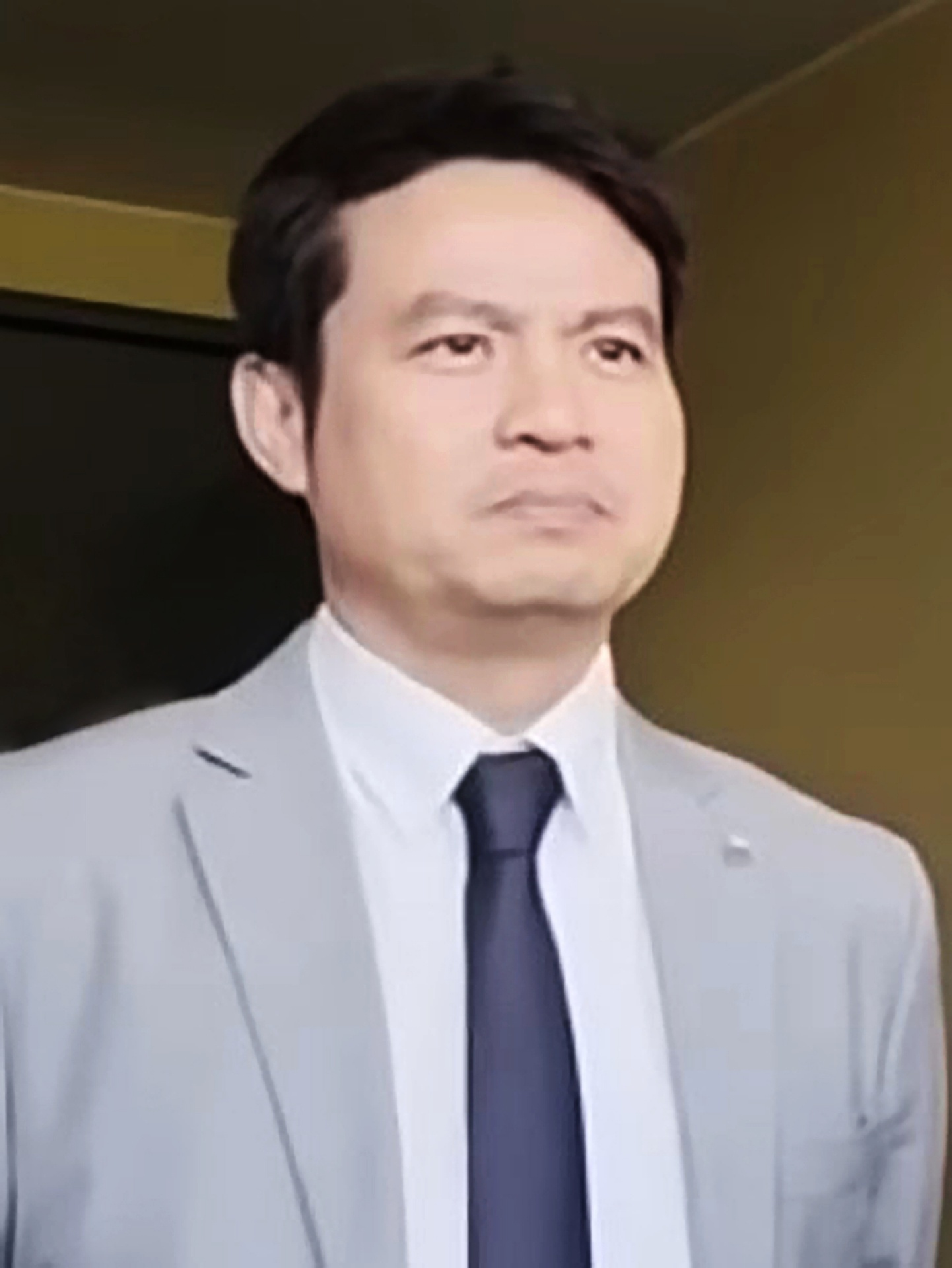
- Paradorn in 2026

Minister of Office of the Prime Minister
- Incumbent
- Assumed office 19 September 2025
- Prime Minister: Anutin Charnvirakul

First Deputy Speaker of the House of Representatives of Thailand
- In office 13 September 2024 – 19 June 2025
- Prime Minister: Paetongtarn Shinawatra
- Speaker: Wan Muhamad Noor Matha
- Preceded by: Pichet Chuamuangphan
- Succeeded by: Chalat Khamchuang

Member of the House of Representatives for Ang Thong province
- Incumbent
- Assumed office 23 December 2007
- Preceded by: Penchisa Hongupathamchai

Personal details
- Born: 18 September 1979 (age 47)
- Party: Bhumjaithai (since 2018)
- Other political affiliations: Chart Thai (2007–2008); Chart Thai Pattana (2008–2018)
- Parent: Somsak Prissanananthakul (father)

Paradorn Prissananantakul (Thai: ภราดร ปริศนานันทกุล, RTGS: Pharadon Pritsanananthakun; born 18 September 1979) is a Thai politician serving as minister attached to the Prime Minister's Office since 2025. He has been a member of the House of Representatives since 2007. He is the son of Somsak Prissanananthakul.
