= Suchart Chomklin =

Thai politician

Suchart Chomklin MPCh MVM
- สุชาติ ชมกลิ่น
- Suchart in 2025

Deputy Prime Minister of Thailand
- In office 19 September 2025 – 30 March 2026
- Prime Minister: Anutin Charnvirakul

Minister of Natural Resources and Environment
- Incumbent
- Assumed office 19 September 2025
- Prime Minister: Anutin Charnvirakul
- Preceded by: Chalermchai Sri-on

Minister of Labour
- In office 5 August 2020 – 1 September 2023
- Prime Minister: Prayut Chan-o-cha; Prawit Wongsuwon (acting)
- Preceded by: Chatumongol Sonakul
- Succeeded by: Phipat Ratchakitprakarn

Deputy Minister of Commerce
- In office 27 April 2024 – 19 September 2025
- Prime Minister: Srettha Thavisin; Phumtham Wechayachai (acting); Paetongtarn Shinawatra; Suriya Juangroongruangkit (acting)
- Minister: Phumtham Wechayachai; Pichai Naripthaphan; Jatuporn Buruspat

Member of the House of Representatives
- Incumbent
- Assumed office 8 February 2026
- Preceded by: Worath Sirirak
- Constituency: Chonburi 1st District
- In office 14 May 2023 – 8 September 2025
- Constituency: Party-list
- In office 3 July 2011 – 8 January 2023
- Preceded by: Pramual Empia
- Succeeded by: Worath Sirirak
- Constituency: Chonburi 1st District

Personal details
- Born: 15 July 1974 (age 52) Chonburi, Thailand
- Party: Bhumjaithai
- Other political affiliations: United Thai Nation (2023-2025); Palang Pracharath (2019–2022); Phalang Chon (2011–2018)
- Spouse: Wimonchit Arintamapong
- Education: Krirk University (BA)
- Profession: Politician

Suchart Chomklin (Thai: สุชาติ ชมกลิ่น, RTGS: Suchat Chomklin; born 15 July 1974) is a Thai politician. He currently serves as Deputy Prime Minister of Thailand and Minister of Natural Resources and Environment in the cabinet of Prime Minister Anutin Charnvirakul since 19 September 2025. He also has served as Minister of Labour in the second cabinet of Prime Minister Prayut Chan-o-cha from 2020 until 2023.

== Early life and education ==
Suchart Chomklin was born on 15 July 1974, is the son of Wichian Chomklin. He lives in Muang District, Chonburi Province and graduated with a bachelor's degree in Bachelor of Management from Krirk University. He married Wimonchit Arintamapong and has 2 sons.

== Political careers ==
Suchart entered the political by becoming a member of the Chonburi Provincial Administrative Organization in Mueang Chonburi District before being elected as a member of the House of Representatives for the first time in 2011 under the Phalang Chon Party and the general election of members of the Thai House of Representatives, 2019, under the Palang Pracharath Party by being elected for a total of 2 consecutive terms.

On 6 August 2020, the royal command was graciously pleased to appoint him as the Minister of Labor under Prime Minister Prayut Chan-o-cha.

In 2022, Suchart joined the Thai-Saudi relations restoration high-level meeting of Prime Minister Prayut. In the past, his father was a Thai worker who had traveled to Saudi Arabia for work before the conflict between Thailand and Saudi that stopped Thai workers from working in Saudi Arabia in 1989. Suchart played an important role in the negotiations to restore relations to bring Thai workers back to work in Saudi Arabia again.

== Royal decorations ==
Suchart has received the following royal decorations in the Honours System of Thailand:

- 2022 - Knight Grand Cordon of the Most Exalted Order of the White Elephant
- 2021 - Knight Grand Cordon of The Most Noble Order of the Crown of Thailand

Political offices
Preceded by Chatumongol Sonakul	Minister of Labour; 2020–2023	Succeeded by Phipat Ratchakitprakarn
