= Prime Minister of Thailand =

Head of government

Prime Minister of the Kingdom of Thailand
- นายกรัฐมนตรีแห่งราชอาณาจักรไทย
- Prime Ministerial Seal

- Prime Ministerial Standard

- Incumbent; Anutin Charnvirakul since 7 September 2025
- Royal Thai Government; Office of the Prime Minister
- Style: Mr. Prime Minister (informal); The Honourable (formal); His Excellency (diplomatic)
- Type: Head of government
- Member of: Cabinet of Thailand; National Security Council; Internal Security Operations Command
- Reports to: National Assembly
- Residence: Phitsanulok Mansion
- Seat: Government House
- Nominator: House of Representatives
- Appointer: King of Thailand; (by royal command)
- Term length: until the expiration of the term or the dissolution of the House of Representatives (no more than eight years in total)
- Constituting instrument: Constitution of Thailand
- Formation: 28 June 1932; 94 years ago
- First holder: Manopakorn Nitithada
- Deputy: Deputy Prime Minister
- Salary: ฿125,590 per month ($3,676 USD)
- Website: thaigov.go.th

The prime minister of Thailand (Thai: นายกรัฐมนตรี, RTGS: Nayok Ratthamontri, pronounced [naːj.jɔk̚.rat̚.tʰa.mon.triː]; literally 'chief minister of state') is the head of government of Thailand. The prime minister is also the chair of the cabinet of Thailand. The post has existed since the Siamese Revolution of 1932, when the country became a constitutional monarchy.

Prior to the 2014 coup d'état, the prime minister was nominated by a vote in the Thai House of Representatives by a simple majority, and is then appointed and sworn in by the King of Thailand. The house's selection is usually based on the fact that either the prime minister is the leader of the largest political party in the lower house or the leader of the largest coalition of parties. In accordance with the 2017 Constitution, the Prime Minister can hold the office for no longer than eight years, consecutively or not.

The current prime minister is Anutin Charnvirakul, leader of the Bhumjaithai Party, since 7 September 2025.

== History ==
The office of the "President of the People's Committee" (ประธานคณะกรรมการราษฎร), later changed to "Prime Minister of Siam" (นายกรัฐมนตรีสยาม), was first created in the Temporary Constitution of 1932. The office was modeled after the prime minister of the United Kingdom, as Siam became a parliamentary democracy in 1932 after a bloodless revolution. However, the idea of a separate head of government in Thailand is not new.

Prior to 1932, Thailand was ruled by absolute monarchs, who acted as both the head of state and the government. However, during the middle and latter reigns of the Chakri dynasty, several individuals were perceived to hold a post equivalent to a head of government. During the reign of King Mongkut, Somdet Chao Phraya Si Suriyawongse had a very significant role in an otherwise absolutist system. During the reign of King Chulalongkorn, Prince Damrong Rajanubhab took over this role. In fact, the office most considered the precursor of that of the prime minister was the ancient office of Samuhanayok (สมุหนายก), which was run by an Akkhra Maha Senabodi (อัครมหาเสนาบดี) or "chief minister in charge of civilian affairs".

The first prime minister of Siam was Phraya Manopakorn Nititada, a judge. The title of the office was changed from "Prime Minister of Siam" to "Prime Minister of Thailand" in 1945 and then permanently with the renaming of Siam to Thailand in 1949. For most of its existence, the office has been occupied by Army leaders; sixteen out of thirty. Military dominance began with the country's second prime minister, Phraya Phahon Phonphayuhasena, who ousted his civilian predecessor in a coup in 1933. The longest-serving prime minister was Field Marshal Plaek Phibunsongkhram at 14 years, 11 months, and 18 days. The shortest was Thawi Bunyaket at just 18 days. Nine were removed by coups d'état, three were disqualified by court order, and eleven resigned from office. The youngest ever to occupy office is Paetongtarn Shinawatra at 37 years old. Thailand received its first female prime minister, Yingluck Shinawatra, in 2011. Every prime minister since Manopakorn Nititada has been Buddhist.

The current 2017 constitution states that the Prime Minister shall hold the office for no longer than eight years, consecutively or not. The term limit was the subject of legal challenge in 2022 after there were debates of how to count the term. The Constitutional Court ruled 6–3 that the term would be counted from the promulgation of the 2017 constitution, so that Prayut Chan-o-cha was allowed to continue his premiership despite having held the position since the 2014 coup.

== Appointment ==
According to the 2007 constitution, the prime minister of the Kingdom of Thailand must be a member of the House of Representatives. Therefore, the qualifications for the office of prime minister are the same as the qualifications for membership in the house.

Prior to the 2014 coup d'état, to be appointed, the nominee for the office must have the support of one-fifth of the members of the House of Representatives. Then after a simple majority vote in the house, a resolution will be passed and submitted to the king, who will then make a formal appointment by giving his royal assent to the resolution. This must take place within thirty days after the beginning of the first session of the House of Representatives after an election. If no candidate can be found within this time period, then it is the duty of the president of the National Assembly of Thailand to submit the name considered most worthy for the king to formalize.

The nominee and eventual prime minister is always the leader of the largest political party in the lower house or the leader of the majority coalition formed after an election.

Under the junta, until 2019, the nominee for the office was selected by National Legislative Assembly, with the House of Representatives having been abolished. Under the constitution written by the junta, between 2019 and 2024 appointed by the full National Assembly, including the military-appointed Senate, the prime minister is currently appointed by the House of Representatives only.

== Function ==
The prime minister is the de facto chair of the Cabinet of Thailand. The appointment and removal of ministers can only be made with their advice. As the leader of the government, the prime minister is therefore ultimately responsible for the failings and performance of their ministers and the government as a whole. The prime minister cannot hold office for a consecutive period of more than eight years. As the most visible member of the government, the prime minister represents the country abroad and is the main spokesperson for the government at home. The prime minister must, under the constitution, lead the cabinet in announcing the government's policy statement in front of a joint session of the National Assembly, within fifteen days of being sworn in.

The prime minister is also directly responsible for many departments. These include the National Intelligence Agency, the Bureau of the Budget, the Office of the National Security Council, the Office of the Council of State, the Office of the Civil Service Commission, the Office of the National Economic and Social Development Board, the Office of Public Sector Development Commission, and the Internal Security Operations Command. Legislatively all money bills introduced in the National Assembly must require the prime minister's approval.

The prime minister can be removed by a vote of no confidence. This process can be evoked, firstly with the vote of only one-fifth of the members of the House of Representatives for a debate on the matter. Then after the debate a vote is taken and with a simple majority the prime minister can be removed. This process cannot be repeated within one parliamentary session.

== Office and residence ==
The prime minister is aided in their work by the Office of the Prime Minister (สำนักนายกรัฐมนตรี) a cabinet-level department headed usually by two ministers of state. These offices are housed in the Government House of Thailand (ทำเนียบรัฐบาล) in the Dusit area of Bangkok.

The official residence of the prime minister is the Phitsanulok Mansion (บ้านพิษณุโลก), in the center of Bangkok. The mansion was built during the reign of King Vajiravudh. It became an official residence in 1979. The mansion is rumored to have many ghosts, therefore most prime ministers live in their private residences and only use the house for official business.

== Deputy prime ministers ==
Several deputy prime ministers of Thailand (รองนายกรัฐมนตรี) can be appointed. This position can be combined with other ministerial portfolios.

Office (Another office)	Portrait	Name	Appointment	Party
Deputy Prime Minister (Minister of Transport)		Phipat Ratchakitprakarn	19 September 2025	Bhumjaithai
Deputy Prime Minister		Songsak Thongsri	30 March 2026	Bhumjaithai
Deputy Prime Minister (Minister of Finance)		Ekniti Nitithanprapas	19 September 2025	Bhumjaithai
Deputy Prime Minister (Minister of Foreign Affairs)		Sihasak Phuangketkeow	30 March 2026	Bhumjaithai
Deputy Prime Minister (Minister of Commerce)		Suphajee Suthumpun	30 March 2026	Bhumjaithai
Deputy Prime Minister		Pakorn Nilprapunt	30 March 2026	Independent
Deputy Prime Minister (Minister of Higher Education, Science, Research and Innovation)		Yodchanan Wongsawat	30 March 2026	Pheu Thai

== See also ==
- List of prime ministers of Thailand
- Constitution of Thailand
- Government of Thailand
- Office of the Prime Minister
- Cabinet of Thailand
