= Suphajee Suthumpun =

Thai business executive (born 1964)

- ศุภจี สุธรรมพันธ์ุ
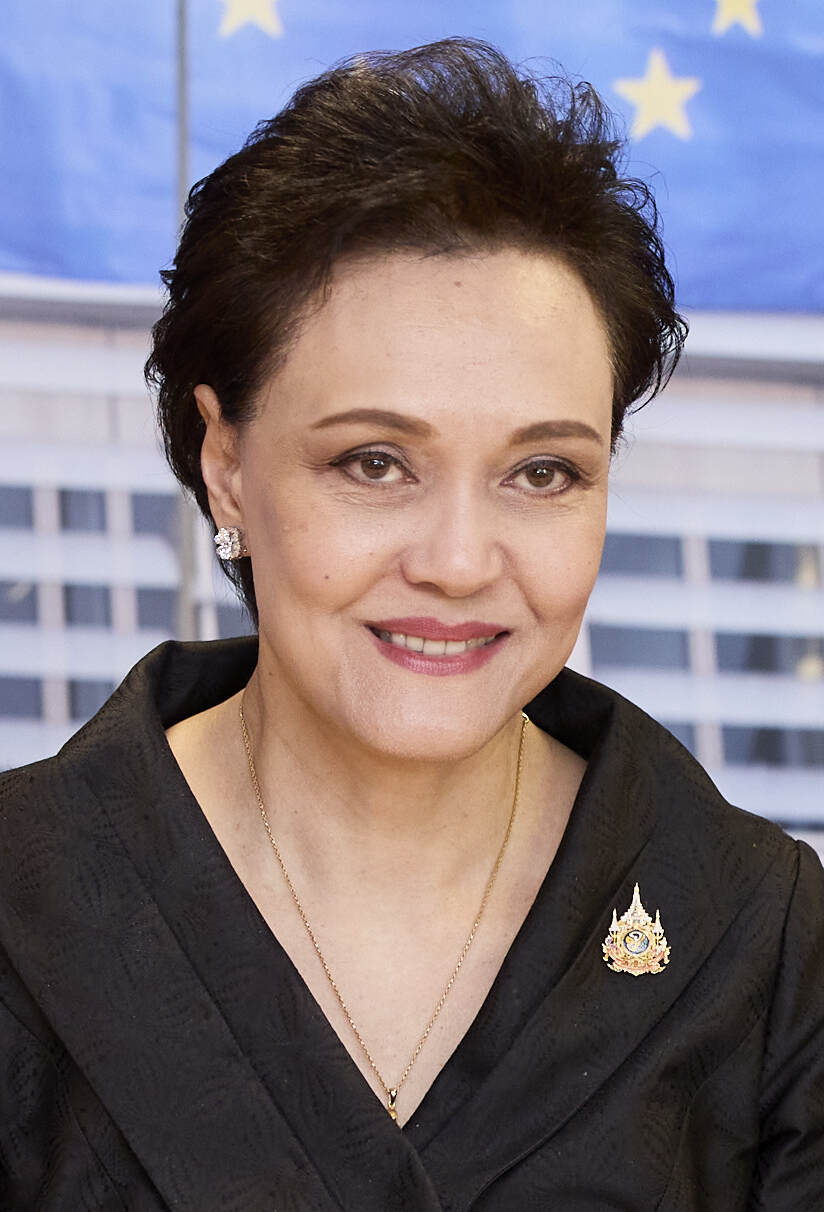
- Suphajee in 2026

Deputy Prime Minister of Thailand
- Incumbent
- Assumed office 30 March 2026
- Prime Minister: Anutin Charnvirakul

Minister of Commerce
- Incumbent
- Assumed office 19 September 2025
- Prime Minister: Anutin Charnvirakul
- Preceded by: Jatuporn Buruspat

Personal details
- Born: 13 November 1964 (age 61) Phra Pradaeng District, Samut Prakan, Thailand
- Party: Bhumjaithai
- Education: Thammasat University; Northrop University
- Occupation: bussinesswoman, politician

Suphajee Suthumpun (Thai: ศุภจี สุธรรมพันธุ์, RTGS: Suphachi Suthamphan; born 1964) is a Thai business executive who has served as the Minister of Commerce since 2025. She was the CEO of the hotel business Dusit International. And she became the first woman to hold the office of Deputy Prime Minister in the 94 years since the Siamese revolution of 1932.

== Biography ==
Suphajee completed a bachelor’s degree in sociology and anthropology at Thammasat University in Bangkok. She also holds a master's degree in business administration, specialising in international finance, from Northrop University in the United States.

Suphajee worked at IBM for over 20 years, beginning her career at the company in 1989. She served as Managing Director of IBM Thailand (2003–2007), becoming the first woman appointed as the company's general manager in Thailand. She later held regional roles at IBM ASEAN, including General Manager and Vice President for General Business (2007–2009), Client Advocacy Executive in the chairman's office at IBM headquarters in New York (2009–2010), becoming the first executive from ASEAN to hold this position; and finally returning as General Manager for Global Technology Services, IBM ASEAN (2010–2011). She has also held the position of CEO of Thaicom. In 2016 she was appointed CEO of Dusit International. She has now resigned from this position to serve as Minister in accordance with the Constitution.

Suphajee also served as an independent director for Kasikornbank and SCG Packaging. She resigned from all three positions in September 2025.

== Ministerial appointment ==
Suphajee was approached by Prime Minister Anutin Charnvirakul to serve as Minister of Commerce, and she accepted the invitation. Later, on 19 September 2025, the Royal Gazette announced her appointment to the position in the Anutin Cabinet.

Following the Bhumjaithai Party's victory in the 2026 general election, she was re-appointed as Minister of Commerce and received an additional appointment as Deputy Prime Minister.
