= List of government ministries of Thailand =

The Government Ministries of Thailand (Thai: กระทรวง: Krasuang) are the government agencies that compose the executive branch of the Government of Thailand. Each ministry is headed by a minister of state (Thai: รัฐมนตรีว่าการกระทรวง, RTGS: Ratthamontri Wa Kan Krasuang) and, depending on the prime minister, several deputy ministers (Thai: รัฐมนตรีช่วยว่าการกระทรวง) . The combined heads of these agencies form the Cabinet of Thailand. There are 19 ministries. The combined employees of these departments make up the civil service of Thailand.

== Ministries ==
Ministry Name		Location	Created	Minister	Seal		Website
English	Thai	Location	Created	Minister	Image	Name	Website
Office of the Prime Minister (OPM)	สำนักนายกรัฐมนตรี	Government House, Phitsanulok Rd., Dusit, Bangkok	1933	Supamas Isarabhakdi		Seal of Rajasiha and Gajasiha, the Protectors of the Constitution	https://www.thaigov.go.th/
Office of the Prime Minister (OPM)	สำนักนายกรัฐมนตรี	Government House, Phitsanulok Rd., Dusit, Bangkok	1933	Napinthorn Srisanpang		Seal of Rajasiha and Gajasiha, the Protectors of the Constitution	https://www.thaigov.go.th/
Office of the Prime Minister (OPM)	สำนักนายกรัฐมนตรี	Government House, Phitsanulok Rd., Dusit, Bangkok	1933	Paradorn Prissananantakul		Seal of Rajasiha and Gajasiha, the Protectors of the Constitution	https://www.thaigov.go.th/
Office of the Prime Minister (OPM)	สำนักนายกรัฐมนตรี	Government House, Phitsanulok Rd., Dusit, Bangkok	1933	Suksomruay Wantaneeakul		Seal of Rajasiha and Gajasiha, the Protectors of the Constitution	https://www.thaigov.go.th/
Ministry of Defence (MOD)	กระทรวงกลาโหม	Ministry of Defence HQ, Sanam Chai Rd., Phra Nakhon, Bangkok	1887	Adul Boonthamcharoen		Seal of the Thai Armed Forces	https://www.mod.go.th/
Ministry of Finance (MOF)	กระทรวงการคลัง	Ministry of Finance HQ, Rama VI Rd., Phaya Thai, Bangkok	1875	Ekniti Nitithanprapas		Seal of the Bird of Paradise	https://www.mof.go.th/
Ministry of Foreign Affairs (MFA)	กระทรวงการต่างประเทศ	Ministry of Foreign Affairs HQ, Si Ayutthaya Rd., Ratchathewi, Bangkok	1840	Sihasak Phuangketkeow		Seal of the Crystal Lotus	https://www.mfa.go.th/
Ministry of Tourism and Sports (MOTS)	กระทรวงการท่องเที่ยวและกีฬา	Chaeng Watthana Government Complex, Chaeng Watthana Rd., Lak Si, Bangkok	2002	Surasak Phancharoenworakul		Seal of the Lord of Strength riding Airavata above the royal barge Suphannahong	https://www.mots.go.th/
Ministry of Social Development and Human Security (MSDHS)	กระทรวงการพัฒนาสังคมและความมั่นคงของมนุษย์	Ministry of Social Development and Human Security HQ, Krung Kasem Rd., Pom Prap Sattru Phai, Bangkok	2002	Nikorn Soemklang		Seal of the Lord of Creatures	https://www.m-society.go.th/
Ministry of Higher Education, Science, Research and Innovation (MHESI)	กระทรวงการอุดมศึกษา วิทยาศาสตร์ วิจัยและนวัตกรรม	Ministry of Higher Education, Science, Research and Innovation HQ, Si Ayutthaya Rd., Ratchathewi, Bangkok	2019	Yodchanan Wongsawat		Seal of the Vajra	https://www.mhesi.go.th/
Ministry of Agriculture and Cooperatives (MOAC)	กระทรวงเกษตรและสหกรณ์	Ministry of Agriculture and Cooperatives HQ, Ratchadamnoen Nok Rd., Phra Nakhon, Bangkok	1892	Suriya Juangroongruangkit		Seal of Varuna on Naga's Back	https://www.moac.go.th/
Ministry of Transport (MOT)	กระทรวงคมนาคม	Ministry of Transport HQ, Ratchadamnoen Nok Rd., Pom Prap Sattru Phai, Bangkok	1912	Phipat Ratchakitprakarn		Seal of Rama on the Chariot	https://www.mot.go.th/
Ministry of Digital Economy and Society (MDES)	กระทรวงดิจิทัลเพื่อเศรษฐกิจและสังคม	Chaeng Watthana Government Complex, Chaeng Watthana Rd., Lak Si, Bangkok	2016	Chaichanok Chidchob		Seal of Budha	https://www.mdes.go.th/
Ministry of Natural Resources and Environment (MNRE)	กระทรวงทรัพยากรธรรมชาติและสิ่งแวดล้อม	Ministry of Natural Resources and Environment HQ, Phahonyothin Rd., Phaya Thai, Bangkok	2002	Suchart Chomklin		Seal of the Shield of Nature	http://www.mnre.go.th/
Ministry of Energy (MENE)	กระทรวงพลังงาน	Energy Complex, Vibhavadi Rangsit Rd., Chatuchak, Bangkok	2002	Akanat Promphan		Seal of Lokuttara	https://www.energy.go.th/
Ministry of Commerce (MOC)	กระทรวงพาณิชย์	Ministry of Commerce HQ, Nonthaburi 1 Rd., Mueang Nonthaburi, Nonthaburi	1892	Suphajee Suthumpun		Seal of Vishvakarma	https://www.moc.go.th/
Ministry of Interior (MOI)	กระทรวงมหาดไทย	Ministry of Interior HQ, Atsadang Rd., Phra Nakhon district, Bangkok	1892	Anutin Charnvirakul		Seal of the Lion	https://www.moi.go.th/
Ministry of Justice (MOJ)	กระทรวงยุติธรรม	Chaeng Watthana Government Complex, Chaeng Watthana Rd., Lak Si, Bangkok	1892	Rutthaphon Naowarat		Seal of the Scales of Justice	https://www.moj.go.th/
Ministry of Labour (MOL)	กระทรวงแรงงาน	Ministry of Labour HQ, Mit Maitri Rd., Din Daeng, Bangkok	1993	Julapun Amornvivat		Seal of the Three Deities	https://www.mol.go.th/
Ministry of Culture (MCUL)	กระทรวงวัฒนธรรม	Watthanatham Wisit Building, Thiam Ruam Mit Rd., Huai Khwang, Bangkok	2002	Sabida Thaised		Seal of the Illumed Baldachin	https://www.m-culture.go.th/
Ministry of Education (MOE)	กระทรวงศึกษาธิการ	Chandra Kasem Palace, Ratchadamnoen Nok Rd., Dusit, Bangkok	1892	Prasert Jantararuangtong		Seal of the Wheel of Law on the boundary stone	http://www.moe.go.th/
Ministry of Public Health (MOPH)	กระทรวงสาธารณสุข	Ministry of Public Health HQ, Tiwanon Rd., Mueang Nonthaburi, Nonthaburi	1942	Pattana Promphat		Seal of Caduceus	https://www.moph.go.th/
Ministry of Industry (MIND)	กระทรวงอุตสาหกรรม	Ministry of Industry HQ, Rama VI Rd., Ratchathewi, Bangkok	1942	Varawut Silpa-archa		Seal of Narayana Churning the Ocean of Milk	https://www.industry.go.th/

== History ==
During the Rattanakosin Period, the kingdom's administration was similar to that of the Ayutthaya Period. There were two chief ministers (Thai: อัครมหาเสนาบดี: Akkhramahasenabodi): the first running military affairs or samuhakalahom (Thai: สมุหกลาโหม), and the second Samuhanayok (Thai: สมุหนายก) for civilian affairs. The civilian ministry was divided further into four kroms (Thai: กรม), headed by a senabodi (Thai: เสนาบดี) or 'minister'. This type of administration was called the Chatusadom (Thai: จตุสดมภ์):

Ministries
Name	Thai Name	Head	Purpose
Krom Nakhonban or Kromma Wiang	กรมนครบาล หรือ กรมเวียง	Senabodi	Cities and local administration
Kromma Wang	กรมวัง	Senabodi	Palace affairs
Kromma Khlang	กรมคลัง	Senabodi	Treasury and trade
Kromma Na	กรมนา	Senabodi	Agriculture and land

=== Rama V reforms ===
King Chulalongkorn (Rama V), who had received a European education and traveled widely, reformed the administration of the state. In 1875, he issued a royal decree to bring about this reform, dividing and creating many departments, and thereby preventing the archaic system from collapsing.

The administrative reforms of Chulalongkorn created six ministries (Thai: กระทรวง: krasuang), each headed by a minister of state or (Thai: รัฐมนตรี, RTGS: ratthamontri):

Ministries
Name	Thai Name	RTGS	Head	Purpose
Ministry of Interior	กระทรวงมหาดไทย	Krasuang Mahatthai	Minister	Local administration and the north
Ministry of War	กระทรวงยุทธนาธิการ	Krasuang Yuttana Thikarn	Minister	Military and the south
Ministry of Metropolitan Affairs	กระทรวงนครบาล	Krasuang Nakhonban	Minister	Bangkok and surrounding area
Ministry of the Royal Household	กระทรวงวัง	Krasuang Wang	Minister	Palace affairs
Ministry of Finance	กระทรวงการคลัง	Krasuang Kan Khlang	Minister	Finance and commerce
Ministry of Agriculture	กระทรวงเกษตราธิการ	Krasuang Kasettrathikarn	Minister	Agriculture and land

A further four were soon added:

Ministries
Name	Thai Name	Head	Purpose
Ministry of Foreign Affairs	กระทรวงการต่างประเทศ	Minister	Foreign affairs and relations
Ministry of Justice	กระทรวงยุติธรรม	Minister	Justice and the judiciary
Ministry of Transport and Communication	กระทรวงโยธาธิการ	Minister	Transport and communication (railways and telegrams)
Ministry of Education	กระทรวงธรรมการ	Minister	Education

By 1900 the entire structure was formed. The ten ministries became the center of Siamese government and rule. After the 1932 Revolution, most of the ministries were retained by the Khana Ratsadon, however from then on the ministers were chosen by the prime minister and not the king.

== See also ==
- Cabinet of Thailand
- Independent agencies of the Thai government
- Government of Thailand
- List of state enterprises of Thailand
- Politics of Thailand
- Prime Minister of Thailand
