= Cabinet of Thailand =

Senior decision-making body of the Thai government

Council of Ministers of the Kingdom of Thailand
- Thai: คณะรัฐมนตรีแห่งราชอาณาจักรไทย
- Seal of the Council of Ministers

Cabinet overview
- Formed: 28 June 1932 (94 years ago)
- Type: A council to discharge the duties of administering the government according to collective responsibility
- Jurisdiction: Government of Thailand
- Motto: สุจริต เสียสละ สามัคคี (Honesty, Sacrifice, Unity)

The cabinet of Thailand (formally, the Council of Ministers of Thailand; Thai: คณะรัฐมนตรี; RTGS: Khana Ratthamontri) is a body composed of thirty-five (35) of the most senior members of the government of the Kingdom of Thailand. The cabinet is the primary organ of the executive branch of the Thai government. Members of the cabinet are nominated by the prime minister and formally appointed by the King of Thailand. Most members are governmental department heads with the title of "minister of state" (Thai: รัฐมนตรี; RTGS: Ratthamontri). The cabinet is chaired by the Prime Minister of Thailand. The cabinet is often collectively called "the government" or "the Royal Thai Government".

== History ==
Prior to the Revolution of 1932, the absolutist Chakri kings ruled Siam through a series of "krom" (Thai: กรม) and "senabodi" (Thai: เสนาบดี). On 15 April 1874 King Chulalongkorn founded the King's Privy Council (Thai: สภาที่ปรึกษาในพระองค์) (which still exists today) made up of 49 senior princes and officials. For the first time the kings of Siam exercised his powers through a council.

On 14 July 1925 King Prajadhipok formed the Supreme Council of State of Siam (Thai: อภิรัฐมนตรีสภา; RTGS: Aphiratthamontrisapha) made up of 5 senior princes (all of them his brothers and all of them ministers of state) to help govern the country. However, after the revolution in 1932, the Khana Ratsadon decided to dissolve this council. Instead the new constitution created a direct precursor of the cabinet called: the People's Committee of Siam (Thai: คณะกรรมการราษฎร; RTGS: Khana Kammakan Ratsadon) led by a president. The privy council from then on became a royal advisory council.

With the promulgation of "permanent" constitution at the end of that year, the name of the committee was changed to the "council of ministers" and the name of the chair to prime minister, after King Prajadhipok deemed the old names too communistic. The first cabinet of Thailand was led by Phraya Manopakorn Nititada. All government departments and agencies were then immediately transferred to its control. To date there have been 58 cabinets of Thailand.

== Ministers of State ==
=== Qualifications ===
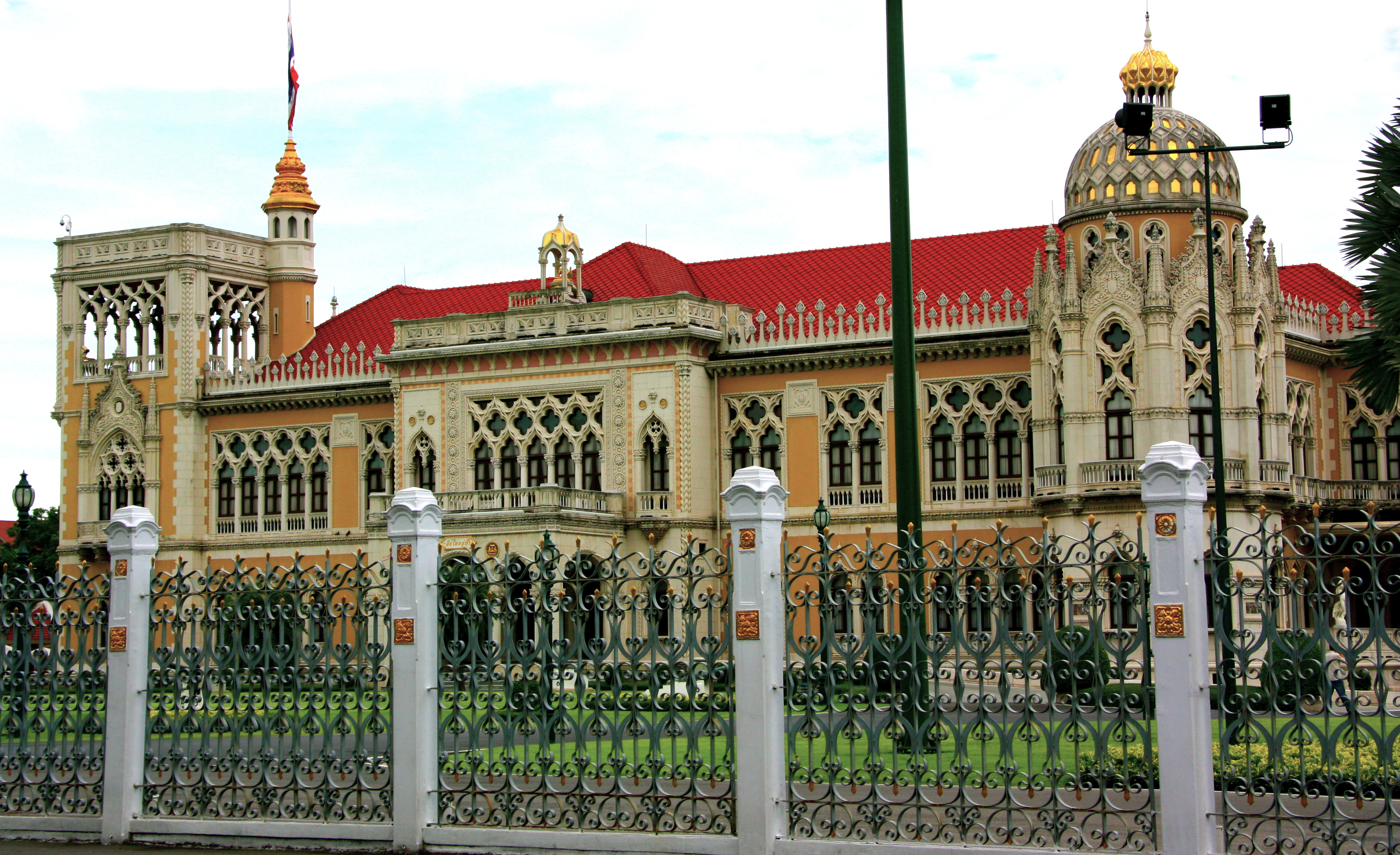
Government House in 2009, the meeting place and office of the Cabinet

According to the 2007 Constitution the cabinet is restricted to no more than 35 members. Members of the cabinet, unlike the prime minister, do not need to be a member of the House of Representatives, however most of them are. To be eligible to be a minister an individual must meet the following qualifications:

- Be a Thai national by birth.
- Be older than 35 years of age.
- Have graduated with no less than a bachelor's degree or its equivalent.
- Not be a member of the Senate (former senators must wait two years after their term of office to be eligible)

The individual must also: not be addicted to drugs, not have been bankrupt, not be a monk or a member of the clergy, not be disenfranchised, not be mentally infirm, not be under indictment or conviction, not have been expelled by a state agency for corruption or incompetence, not be a paid civil servant or member of the judiciary, and not ever been removed from any office by the Senate of Thailand.

Ministers of State are in theory appointed by the king, however in truth they are appointed at the advice of the prime minister to the king. Before taking office, a minister must make a solemn declaration before the king in the following words:

"I, (name of the declarer), do solemnly declare that I will be loyal to the King and will faithfully perform my duties in the interests of the country and of the people. I will also uphold and observe the Constitution of the Kingdom of Thailand in every respect."

=== Roles ===
The 2007 Constitution of Thailand calls the cabinet the "Council of Ministers". The entire IXth chapter is dedicated to it. There are only 20 cabinet ministries, which means that 15 ministers are without portfolio. They can, however, be appointed deputy prime ministers or deputy ministers. According to the constitution, the cabinet must, within fifteen days of being sworn in, state its policies to the National Assembly of Thailand. Ministers have the right to go in person to the national assembly to state and explain policies or opinions.

Each minister is responsible for his actions and the actions of his department and is therefore accountable to the national assembly. Therefore, the assembly can compel the minister to appear before it and explain his actions. The House of Representatives and the Senate can forcefully remove a sitting minister by a vote of no confidence. A one-sixth of the chamber vote is needed to call a debate and a simple majority is required for removal. A minister can also be removed by the king on the advice of the prime minister.

== The Cabinet ==
=== Function ===
As the primary government institution in the executive branch, the cabinet is ultimately responsible for the administration and management of various government agencies and departments. It is also the primary institution for the formulation of policies with regards to all areas of politics and governing. Legislatively the cabinet is one of the institutions allowed to submit bills to the National Assembly for consideration. The cabinet is also allowed to call a joint sitting of the National Assembly to consider important bills or even join a joint sitting of the Assembly. The cabinet is also allowed to call a national referendum.

The cabinet is governed by the rule of collective responsibility, in which the members of the cabinet must support all policies despite personal or private disagreement. As a result, if the government fails or if the policies of the government fails then the entire cabinet must take responsibility; and resign in its entirety. The cabinet's term is wedded to that of the Prime Minister. The Leader of the Opposition is allowed to create his own cabinet or the Shadow Cabinet of Thailand.

== Current Cabinet ==
List of the Prime Minister and Ministers of Thailand on 30 March 2026

On 30 March 2026, King Vajiralongkorn appointed the 35-member cabinet as selected by Anutin Charnvirakul, including seven deputy prime ministers, following his re-election for a second term.

Second Anutin cabinet
Minister	Office(s)	Took office	Political party
Anutin Charnvirakul	Prime Minister; Minister of Interior	7 September 2025 (13 months ago)	Bhumjaithai
Phipat Ratchakitprakarn	Deputy Prime Minister; Minister of Transport	30 March 2026 (6 months ago)	Bhumjaithai
Songsak Thongsri	Deputy Prime Minister	30 March 2026 (6 months ago)	Bhumjaithai
Ekniti Nitithanprapas	Deputy Prime Minister; Minister of Finance	30 March 2026 (6 months ago)	Bhumjaithai
Sihasak Phuangketkeow	Deputy Prime Minister Minister of Foreign Affairs	30 March 2026 (6 months ago)	Bhumjaithai
Suphajee Suthumpun	Deputy Prime Minister Minister of Commerce	30 March 2026 (6 months ago)	Bhumjaithai
Pakorn Nilprapunt	Deputy Prime Minister	30 March 2026 (6 months ago)	Independent
Yodchanan Wongsawat	Deputy Prime Minister Minister of Higher Education, Science, Research and Innovation	30 March 2026 (6 months ago)	Pheu Thai
Supamas Isarabhakdi	Ministers Attached to the Prime Minister's Office	30 March 2026 (6 months ago)	Bhumjaithai
Napinthorn Srisanpang	Ministers Attached to the Prime Minister's Office	30 March 2026 (6 months ago)	Bhumjaithai
Paradorn Prissananantakul	Ministers Attached to the Prime Minister's Office	30 March 2026 (6 months ago)	Bhumjaithai
Suksomruay Wantaneeakul	Ministers Attached to the Prime Minister's Office	30 March 2026 (6 months ago)	Bhumjaithai
Lieutenant General Adul Boonthumjaroen	Minister of Defence	30 March 2026 (6 months ago)	Independent
Surasak Phancharoenworakul	Minister of Tourism and Sports	30 March 2026 (6 months ago)	Bhumjaithai
Nikorn Soemklang	Minister of Social Development and Human Security	30 March 2026 (6 months ago)	Pheu Thai
Suriya Jungrungreangkit	Minister of Agriculture and Cooperatives	30 March 2026 (6 months ago)	Pheu Thai
Watcharaphol Khawkhum	Deputy Ministers of Agriculture and Cooperatives	30 March 2026 (6 months ago)	Pheu Thai
Piyarat Tiyapairat	Deputy Ministers of Agriculture and Cooperatives	30 March 2026 (6 months ago)	Pheu Thai
Siripong Angkasakulkiat	Deputy Ministers of Transport	30 March 2026 (6 months ago)	Bhumjaithai
Phattharaphong Phattharaprasit	Deputy Ministers of Transport	30 March 2026 (6 months ago)	Bhumjaithai
Sanphet Boonyamanee	Deputy Ministers of Transport	30 March 2026 (6 months ago)	Bhumjaithai
Chaichanok Chidchob	Minister of Digital Economy and Society	30 March 2026 (6 months ago)	Bhumjaithai
Boonthida Somchai	Deputy Minister of Digital Economy and Society	30 March 2026 (6 months ago)	Bhumjaithai
Suchart Chomklin	Minister of Natural Resources and Environment	30 March 2026 (6 months ago)	Bhumjaithai
Akanat Promphan	Minister of Energy	30 March 2026 (6 months ago)	Bhumjaithai
Polpheer Suwannachee	Deputy Ministers of Interior	30 March 2026 (6 months ago)	Bhumjaithai
Jeseth Thaiseth	Deputy Ministers of Interior	30 March 2026 (6 months ago)	Bhumjaithai
Vorasit Liangprasitl	Deputy Ministers of Interior	30 March 2026 (6 months ago)	Bhumjaithai
Pol. Lt. Gen. Rutthaphon Naowarat	Minister of Justice	30 March 2026 (6 months ago)	Bhumjaithai
Julapun Amornvivat	Minister of Labour	30 March 2026 (6 months ago)	Pheu Thai
Sabida Thaiseth	Minister of Culture	30 March 2026 (6 months ago)	Bhumjaithai
Prasert Jantararuangtong	Minister of Education	30 March 2026 (6 months ago)	Pheu Thai
Akkharanan Kannakittinan	Deputy Minister of Education	30 March 2026 (6 months ago)	Pheu Thai
Pattana Promphat	Minister of Public Health	30 March 2026 (6 months ago)	Bhumjaithai
Varawut Silpa-archa	Minister of Industry	30 March 2026 (6 months ago)	Bhumjaithai

== See also ==
- Prime Minister of Thailand
- King of Thailand
- List of ministries of Thailand
- List of female cabinet ministers of Thailand
- Constitutional organizations of Thailand
- Shadow Cabinet of Thailand
