= Ministry of Commerce (Thailand) =

Government ministry of Thailand

- กระทรวงพาณิชย์
- Seal of Vishvakarman by Prince Narisara Nuwattiwong

- Flag of Vishvakarman by Prince Narisara Nuwattiwong

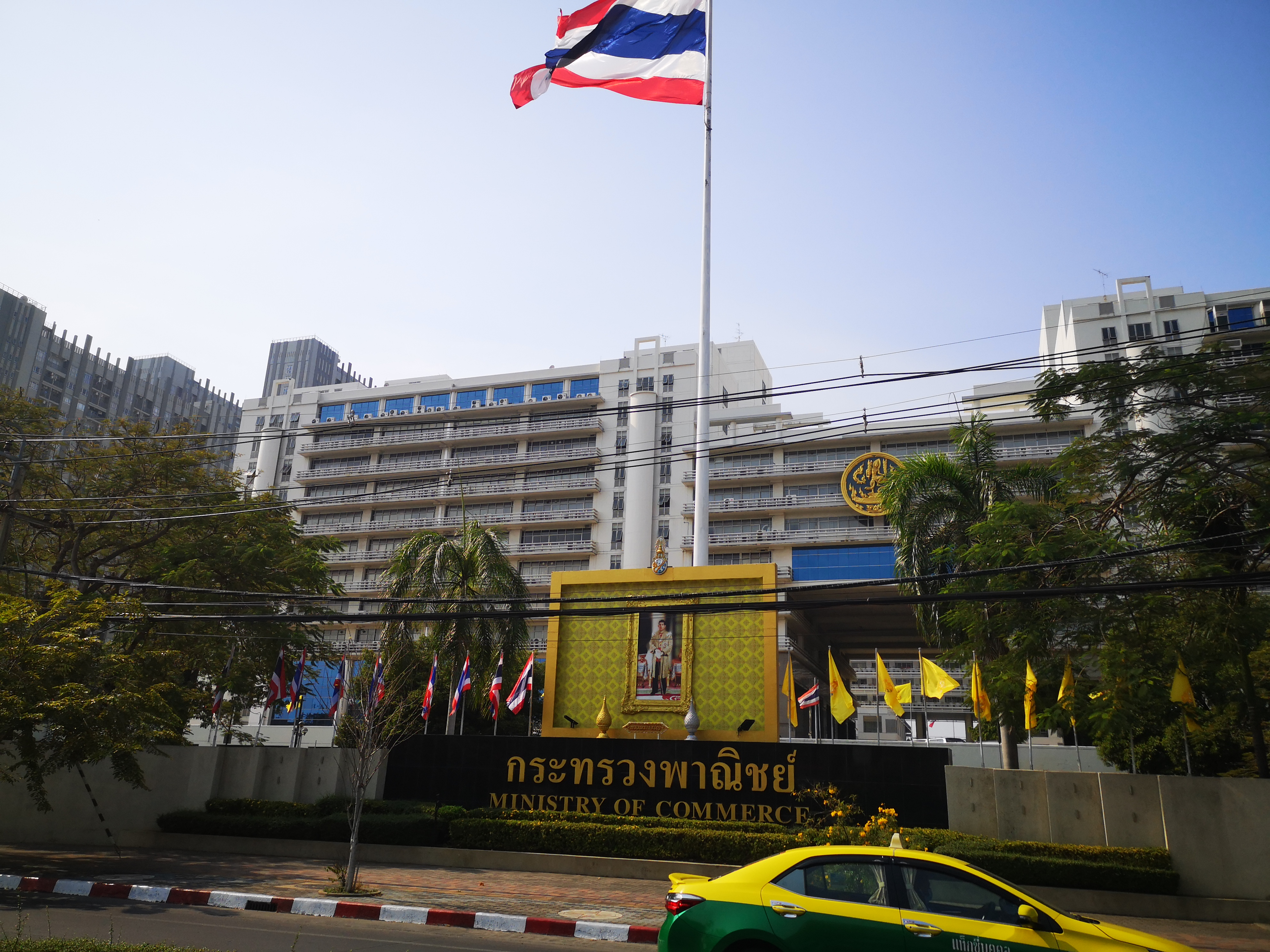
- Ministry Building in 2021

Ministry overview
- Formed: August 20, 1920; 105 years ago
- Jurisdiction: Government of Thailand
- Headquarters: Mueang Nonthaburi, Nonthaburi
- Annual budget: 6,889 million baht (FY2019)
- Minister responsible: Suphajee Suthumpun, Minister
- Ministry executive: Vuttikrai Leewiraphan, Permanent Secretary
- Website: moc.go.th/en (English) moc.go.th/th (Thai)

The Ministry of Commerce (Abrv: MOC; Thai: กระทรวงพาณิชย์, RTGS: Krasuang Phanit) is a cabinet ministry in the government of Thailand. The Minister of Commerce is a member of the Cabinet of Thailand. The ministry is responsible for trade, prices of important agricultural goods, consumer protection, entrepreneurship, insurance, intellectual property protection, exports, and representing Thailand at the World Trade Organization. The Ministry of Commerce was established by royal command of King Vajiravudh (Rama VI) on August 20, 1920, by raising the Department of Commerce and Statistics in the Ministry of Finance to a ministry called the Commerce Dissemination Council. Prince Kitiyakara Voralaksana, the older half-brother of King Vajiravudh was appointed as the first president of the council, with a status equivalent to that of a minister. The ministry moved to its present premises in Nonthaburi in 1989.

== Governance and budget ==
As of 2020, the Minister of Commerce is Jurin Laksanawisit. His deputy minister is Weerasak Wangsuphakijkosol.

MOC's budget for FY2019 is 6,889 million baht. About one-third of that figure is allocated to trade promotion.

== Departments ==
=== Administration ===
- Office of the Minister
- Office of the Permanent Secretary

=== Dependent departments ===
- Department of Trade Negotiations
- Department of Business Development
- Department of International Trade Promotion (DITP): Five offices in Thailand and 61 Thai Trade Centers abroad.
- Department of Foreign Trade (DFT)
- Department of Intellectual Property (DIP)
- Department of Internal Trade (DIT)
  - Central Bureau of Weights and Measures (CBWM)
  - Trade Competition Board (1999–2017)

=== State enterprises ===
- Public Warehouse Organization (PWO)

=== Public organizations ===
- The Gem and Jewelry Institute of Thailand (Public Organization)
- The Support Arts and Crafts International Centre of Thailand (Public Organization)
- International Institute for Trade and Development

== See also ==
- Economy of Thailand
- Foreign Business Act of 1999 (Thailand)
- Cabinet of Thailand
- List of Government Ministers of Thailand
- Government of Thailand
