= Government of Thailand =

Royal Thai Government
- Thai: รัฐบาลไทย
- Central government
- Emblem of Thailand

Overview
- Established: 24 June 1932; 93 years ago
- State: Thailand
- Leader: Prime Minister (Anutin Charnvirakul)
- Appointed by: Monarch (Vajiralongkorn)
- Main organ: Cabinet
- Ministries: 19 ministries and the Office of the Prime Minister
- Responsible to: National Assembly
- Annual budget: ฿3.78 trillion (FY2027)
- Headquarters: 1 Phitsanulok Road, Bangkok
- Website: www.thaigov.go.th

Government of Thailand, officially the Royal Thai Government (RTG; Thai: รัฐบาลไทย, RTGS: Ratthaban Thai, pronounced [rát.tʰā.bāːn tʰāj]), is the central executive authority of the Kingdom of Thailand. The government is led by the prime minister (Anutin Charnvirakul since 7 September 2025) who selects all the other ministers. The country has had a minority coalition government since 2025 led by Bhumjaithai. The country emerged as a modern nation state after the foundation of the Chakri dynasty and the city of Bangkok in 1782. The Revolution of 1932 brought an end to absolute monarchy and replaced it with a constitutional monarchy.

From then on the country was ruled by a succession of military leaders installed after coups d'état, the most recent in May 2014, and a few democratic intervals. The 2007 Constitution (drafted by a military-appointed council, but approved by a referendum) was annulled by the 2014 coup-makers who ran the country as a military dictatorship.

Thailand has so far had twenty Constitutions. Throughout, the basic structure of government has remained the same. The government of Thailand is composed of three branches: the executive, the legislative, and the judiciary. The system of government is modelled after the Westminster system. All branches of government are concentrated in Bangkok, the capital city of Thailand.

From May 2014 until July 2019, Thailand was ruled by a military junta, the National Council for Peace and Order, which partially repealed the 2007 constitution, declared martial law and nationwide curfew, banned political gatherings, arrested and detained politicians and anti-coup activists, imposed internet censorship and took control of the media. On 24 March 2019, Thailand voted in the 2019 Thai general election, supporting a spread of opinion across many political parties vying to be in government.

== The monarchy ==
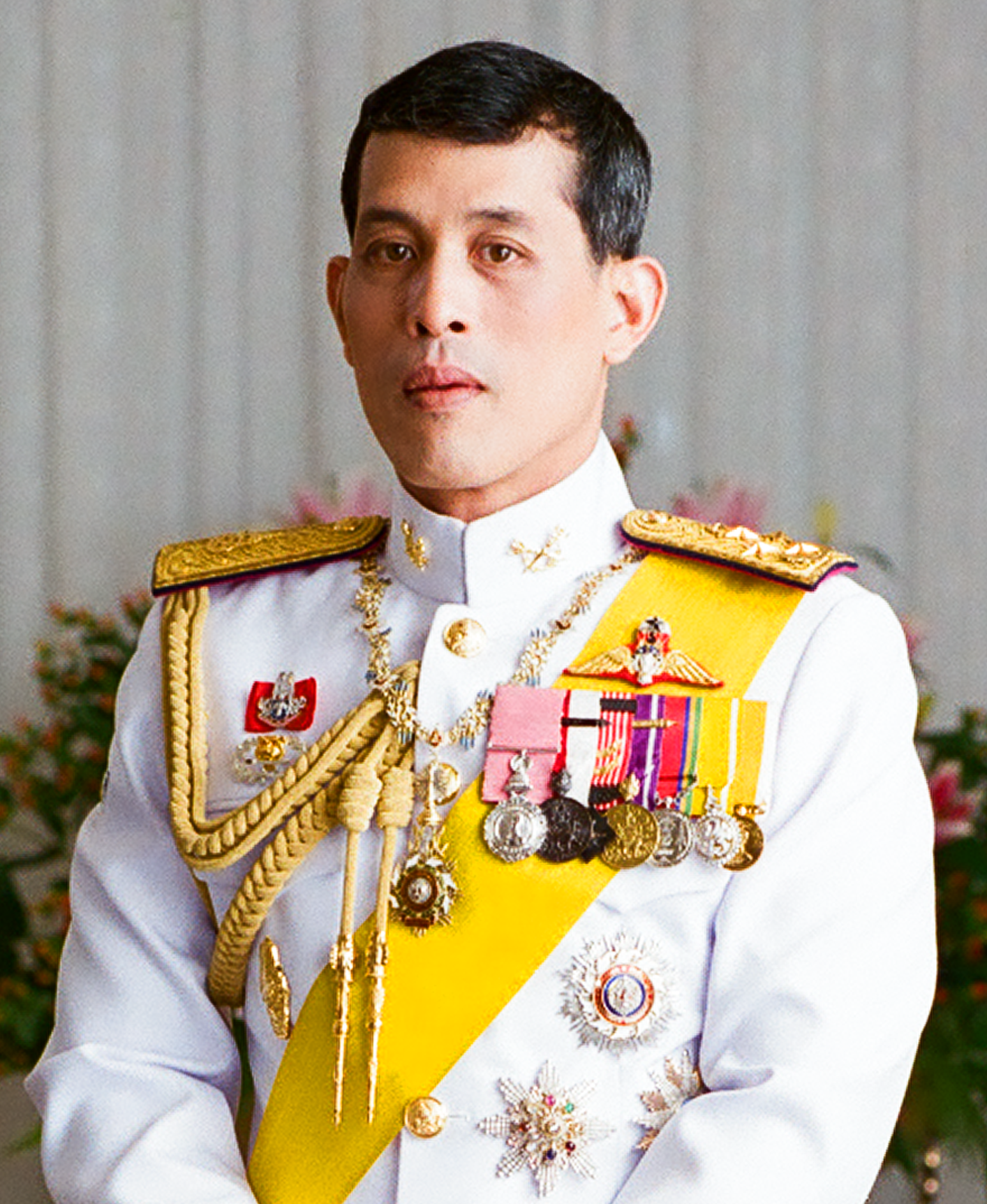
King Maha Vajiralongkorn has been on the throne since 2016.

King Vajiralongkorn (Rama X) of Thailand has reigned since the death of his father Bhumibol Adulyadej (Rama IX) on 13 October 2016; exercising limited rule since 1 December 2016 . He is the head of state, aided in his duties by the Privy Council of Thailand. The constitution stipulates that although the sovereignty of the state is vested in the people, the king will exercise such powers through the three branches of the Thai government. Under the constitution the king is given very little power, but remains a figurehead and symbol of the Thai nation. As the head of state, however, he is given some powers and has a role to play in the workings of government. According to the constitution, the king is head of the armed forces. He is required to be Buddhist as well as the defender of all faiths in the country. The king also retained some traditional powers such as the power to appoint his heirs, the power to grant pardons, and the royal assent.

The king is also head of the House of Chakri, the ruling house of Thailand founded by King Phutthayotfa Chulalok (or Rama I) in 1782. The monarchy and the royal family's influence peaked during the reign of Bhumibol Adunyadei, but it continues to command significant respect in Thailand. Bhumibol commanded popular respect and moral authority, which was used at times to resolve political crises. The monarch's official home is the Grand Palace, but the current king lives primarily in the Chitralada Palace in Bangkok. The monarch's household was managed by the Bureau of the Royal Household and his finances by the Crown Property Bureau, but these offices are being transferred to direct control by the monarchy.

The heir presumptive to the throne is Prince Dipangkorn Rasmijoti, although it is up to the king's discretion whether Prince Dipangkorn will be named Crown Prince in the future. Succession to the throne is governed by the 1924 Palace Law of Succession, promulgated by King Vajiravudh. Palace law follows the male agnatic primogeniture, where males only are allowed to succeed and inheritance is passed only from father to son and through the male line only. However, the 1974 amendment to the Thai constitution allows for a princess to ascend the throne and this particular provision is retained under Section 21 of the 2017 Constitution which reads:

In the case where the Throne becomes vacant and the King has not appointed an Heir under paragraph one, the Privy Council shall submit the name of the Successor to the Throne under section 20 to the Council of Ministers for further submission to the National Assembly for approval. In this regard, the name of a Princess may be submitted. Upon the approval of the National Assembly, the President of the National Assembly shall invite such Successor to ascend the Throne and proclaim such Successor as King.

== Legislative ==
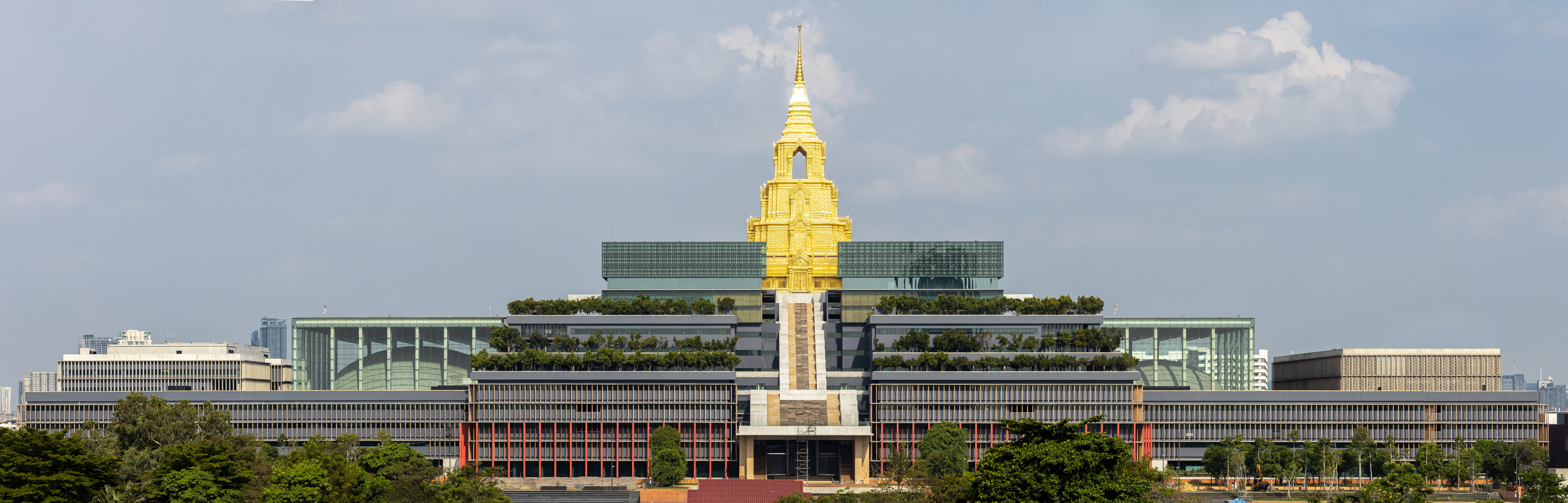
The Sappaya-Sapasathan is the meeting place of the National Assembly of Thailand

=== National assembly ===
The legislative branch (also called the Parliament of Thailand) of the Thai government was first established in the "temporary" constitution of 1932. The assembly first met on 28 June 1932 in the Ananda Samakhom Throne Hall. The National Assembly of Thailand is a bicameral legislature featuring a Senate and a House of Representatives. The legislative branch took its current form in 2007. The national assembly has 750 members. Both houses of the national assembly meet at the Sappaya-Sapasathan.

==== The House of Representatives ====
The lower house of the legislative branch has existed in some form since 1932. The House of Representatives is the primary legislative house of the government of Thailand. The House includes 500 members. 400 of the MPs are elected directly from single-seat constituencies around the country. The other 100 members are selected using proportional representation through party-lists. This latter set of members is selected from eight electoral areas and 375 constituencies. In this mixed member majoritarian system, each voter has two votes, one for the constituency MP, and the other for a party in the voter's electoral area.

The house is a partisan chamber with seven political parties. As the primary legislative chamber, the House has more power than the Senate. The House has the power to remove both the prime minister and cabinet ministers through a vote of no confidence. The house sits for a term of four years; however, a dissolution of the house can happen anytime before the expiration of the term. The house is led by the Speaker of the House of Representatives, who is also the President of the National Assembly. He is assisted by two deputy speakers.

The leader of the largest party or largest coalition party will most likely become prime minister, while the leader of the largest party with no members holding any ministerial positions will become the leader of the opposition. The leader of the opposition is a powerful position with considerable influence. The leader is assisted by a shadow cabinet. The last general election for the house was in 2007.

After the 2007 election the People's Power party (PPP) won the most seats with the Democrats and Chart Thai party trailing behind. The composition of the House changed after the 2008 political crisis and the ruling of the constitutional court on 2 December 2008, in which the PPP, the Chart Thai, and the Neutral Democratic Parties (coalition partners), as well as the prime minister and several party executives were banned from politics for five years. While the successor to the PPP retained most of its seats, its coalition partners defected and joined a Democrat-led government which was inaugurated on 17 December 2008, leaving the For Thais Party (successor of the PPP) and the Pracharaj Party in opposition.

The House of Representatives and the Senate were abolished after 22 May 2014 coup by the NCPO. Currently, according to the interim Constitution of Thailand imposed by NCPO, there is no House of Representatives. Legislative power is vested in the National Legislative Council, appointed by the NCPO.

Affiliation	Members		
Affiliation	pre-Election	Elected	Change
Bhumjaithai	71	192	▲121
People's	143	120	▼23
Pheu Thai	140	74	▼67
Kla Tham	26	58	▲32
Democrat	25	21	▼4
Palang Pracharath	20	5	▼15
United Thai Nation	36	2	▼34
Chart Thai Pattana	10	10	Steady
Prachachat	9	9	Steady
Thai Sang Thai	6	6	Steady
Chart Pattana	2	3	▲1
Thai Ruam Palang	2	2	Steady
Fair Party	1	1	Steady
Thai Liberal	1	1	Steady
New Democracy	1	1	Steady
New Party	1	1	Steady
Thai Progress	0	1	▲1
Independent (Note: Under Thai law, a member of the House of Representatives must be officially affiliated with a political party. However, if for any reason their party membership is rescinded, they can be without a party for up to thirty days. During the thirty days, they must find a new party to affiliate with or their membership of parliament will end.)	0	0	Steady
Total	500	499	▲4
Vacant	N/A	1	▼4
Government majority	N/A	293	▲293

==== The Senate ====
The upper house of the legislative branch was first established in 1946. However, for most of its history the Senate has been the stronghold of the military and the elite. The current Senate has 150 members. Seventy-six members are elected, one per province from 75 provinces of Thailand (Bueng Kan does not have an elected senator yet) and one from the Bangkok Metropolitan Area. The other 74 are selected by the Senate Selection Commission, made up of both elected and appointed officials.

The chamber is strictly non-partisan, and members may not be a member of a partisan organisation, the House of Representatives, the judiciary, or the cabinet for five years. The Senate has little legislative power, but retains considerable powers of scrutiny and appointment as the Senate is vested with the power to advise on the appointment of members of the judiciary and independent government agencies. The Senate sits for a set six year non-renewable term and cannot be dissolved. The Senate is presided over by a president of the Senate, who is also the Vice-President of the National Assembly. He is assisted by two vice-presidents of the Senate. The last election to the Senate was in 2024,

The Senate and the House of Representatives were abolished after 22 May 2014 coup by the "National Council for Peace and Order" (NCPO) government. Following the promulgation of a new constitution in 2017, Thailand held a general election on March 24, 2019, which led to the reinstatement of the House of Representatives. The Senate was also reestablished around the same time, with its initial 250 members being appointed by the National Council for Peace and Order (NCPO) as stipulated by the new constitution's transitional clauses.

== Executive ==
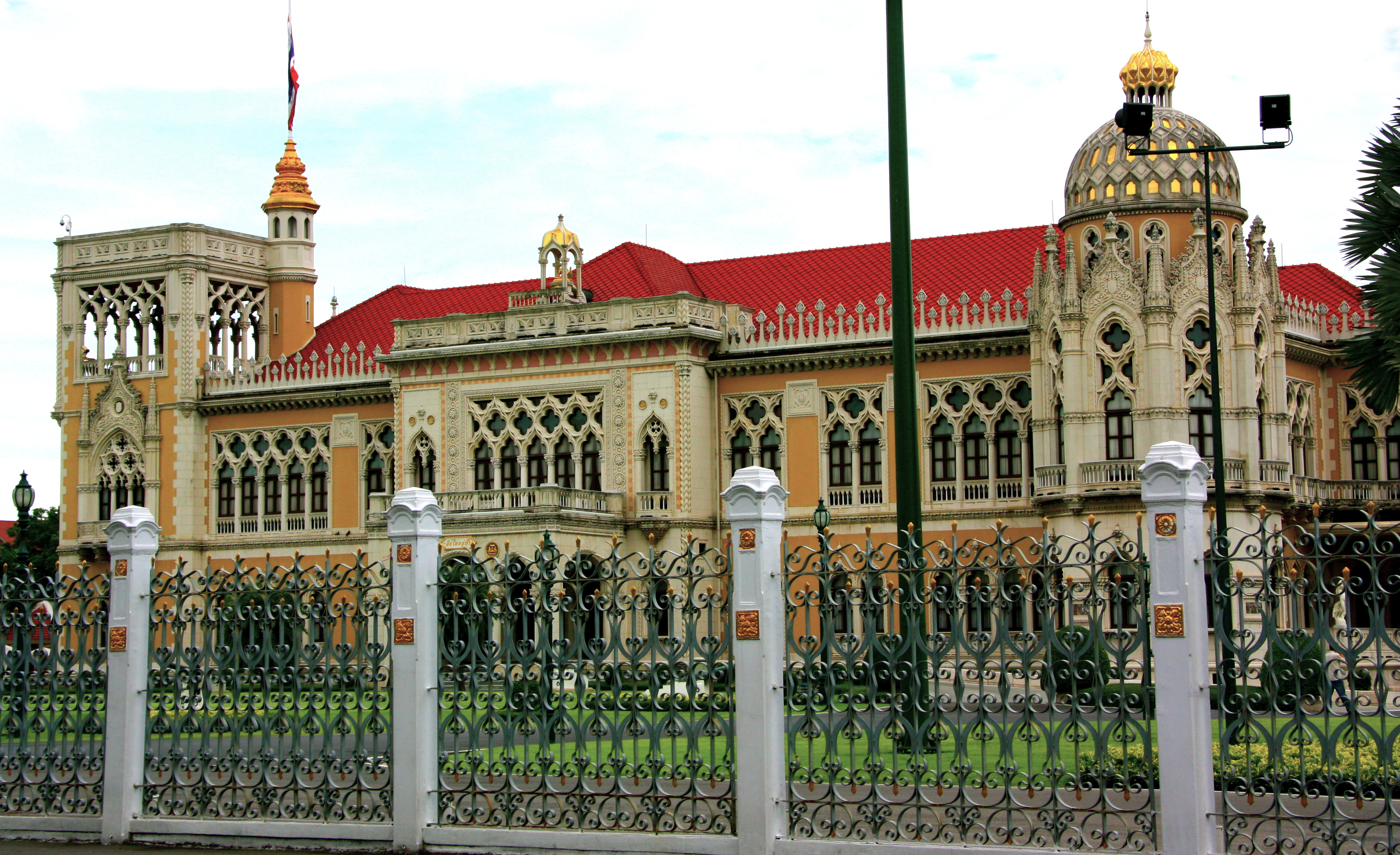
Government House of Thailand, offices of the prime minister and the cabinet of Thailand

=== Prime minister ===
Since 1932 the head of government of Thailand has been the Prime Minister of Thailand, usually the leader of the largest party or the largest coalition party in the lower house of parliament. The prime minister is, in accordance with the constitution, selected, first by an election in the lower house (According to the B.E.2560 Constitution, The Prime Minister will be elected by both houses till Next 5 years), then officially appointed by the King.

The prime minister, head of the executive branch, is also the leader of the Cabinet of Thailand. The prime minister retains the prerogative to appoint or remove any minister. As the most visible member of the government, the prime minister represents the country abroad and is the main spokesperson for the government at home. The prime minister's official residence is Phitsanulok Mansion, a mansion in the Dusit district of Bangkok.

The former prime minister was Yingluck Shinawatra of the Pheu Thai Party, the first female prime minister of Thailand. She was removed from office by the Constitutional Court of Thailand on 7 May 2014, on charges of abuse of power. She was replaced briefly by an interim prime minister, Niwatthamrong Boonsongpaisan, and then succeeded by General Prayut Chan-o-cha, leader of the 2014 Thai coup d'état. As a result of the Constitutional Court's decision on 24 August 2022 to temporarily suspend Prayut Chan-o-cha's premiership due to the ongoing debate about his 8-year term limit, Prawit Wongsuwan took over the position to serve as acting Prime Minister.

=== Cabinet ===
The Cabinet of Thailand or the Council of Ministers of Thailand is a council composed of 35 ministers of state and deputy ministers, who run the cabinet ministries of the kingdom. There are 20 cabinet ministries, accounting for the main portion of state employees. The cabinet is responsible for the formulation and execution of policies of the government. Members of the cabinet do not necessarily need to be members of the lower house as in other countries, but most often are. The Office of the Prime Minister and the cabinet offices occupy the Government House of Thailand.

== Judiciary ==
The judiciary of Thailand is composed of four distinct systems: the Military Court (which has expanded its power since 22 May 2014), the Court of Justice system, the Administrative Court system and the Constitutional Court.

=== Courts of Justice ===
The Courts of Justice are the largest branch of the Thai judiciary system. The courts as mandated in the constitution are composed of three tiers: the Court of First Instance, the Court of Appeals, and the Supreme Court of Justice of Thailand.

The trial court does not keep verbatim transcripts. Instead, the record consists only of the decision reached by the court.

Research judges assist sitting judges. Judges must take an examination and two different examinations are given: one exam is for judges trained in Thailand and a different examination is given for judges who graduate from foreign law schools. All judges are formally appointed by the king.

The Asian Human Rights Commission has called the Thai legal system a "mess" and called for a drastic overhaul of Thailand's criminal procedures. It cited the rampant use of forced confessions, and the fact that even a senior justice ministry official admitted that 30% of cases went to court without evidence. It also criticised the judiciary for failing to ensure that trials are conducted in a timely manner, citing the case of four Thai men accused of plotting to kill Supreme Court President Praman Chansue (Thai: ประมาณ ชันซื่อ). Between 1993 and 2008, the accused were taken before 91 different judges and were present in court on 461 occasions. Mr Praman died in 2007.

=== Administrative courts ===
The administrative court system is made up of two tiers: The Administrative Courts of First Instance and the Supreme Administrative Court. The court system was first created in 1997. The Administrative court primarily hears cases between private citizens and the State or its organs.

=== Constitutional court ===
First set up in 1997, the Constitutional Court of Thailand was created solely as a high court to settle matters pertaining to the constitution. It has since accumulated huge amounts of power and influence, generating many controversies on the way. The Constitutional Court's power was highlighted during the 2006 and 2008 political crises, when it settled political deadlocks and social unrest.

== Legal system ==
Thailand's legal system blends traditional Thai principles and Western laws. The Western-sourced laws are often misused and corrupted. The traditional "Thai" laws are the product of Hindu-Brahmin laws used by the Khmer Empire. There is no discovery in the Thai legal system. Slander and libel are not civil torts in Thailand but criminal offences.

Thailand's legal system has been often criticised by other countries for having penalties of life in prison or even death for crimes such as drug possession or smuggling, while having lenient penalties for crimes such as terrorism and marital abuse resulting in spousal death.

The criminally accused are entitled to have a court-appointed certified translator present in court if they cannot afford one. Appeals must be filed with the trial court within thirty (30) days of the judge reading, signing, and issuing the verdict. There are no juries in trials. Only Thai citizens can be admitted to the Bar and can practice before the courts. Attorneys must carry their current, yellow, bar card when in court and may be required to produce it on challenge.

In Thailand's southern border provinces, where Muslims constitute the majority of the population, provincial Islamic committees have limited jurisdiction over probate, family, marriage, and divorce cases.

Under Section 44 Thailand's Interim Constitution of 2014, the Prime Minister and NCPO leader has complete authority to perform any administrative, legislative, and judicial action as necessary, which then is deemed legal and constitutional.

== Local government ==
Thailand is divided into 76 provinces (changwat, singular and plural). The Ministry of the Interior appoints governors for all provinces. The metropolis of greater Bangkok is a special administrative area at the same level as a province, but the governor is popularly elected.

== Outreach ==
In November 2015 the government launched a "one-stop" website with information on all government services. The website, referred to as "GovChannel", is at GovChannel. It is operated by the Information and Communication Technology Ministry (MICT) and its subsidiary agency, the Digital Government Development Agency (DGA) (formerly the Electronic Government Agency [EGA]). GovChannel links information from four other government websites.

== Calls to move the capital ==
Bangkok, a metropolis of more than 10 million inhabitants, has been called the "world's most primate city". It is home to virtually all government ministries and functionaries. Bangkok is overcrowded, polluted, sinking, and traffic-congested. Its many problems have raised the issue of moving the nation's capital elsewhere, especially given the example of Indonesia's plans to move its capital from Jakarta. The idea is not new: two decades ago, the Thaksin Shinawatra administration assigned the Office of the National Economic and Social Development Council (NESDC), to formulate a plan to move the capital to Nakhon Nayok. The flooding of Bangkok in 2011 revived the idea of moving government functions from Bangkok given its subsidence rate of two centimetres per year and its propensity to flood. In 2017, the military government assigned NESDC to study the possibility of moving government offices from Bangkok to Chachoengsao in the east.

== See also ==
- Organization of the government of Thailand
- Independent agencies of the Thai government
- State agencies of Thailand
