= Federation of Thai Industries =

Private sector organisation

- สภาอุตสาหกรรมแห่งประเทศไทย
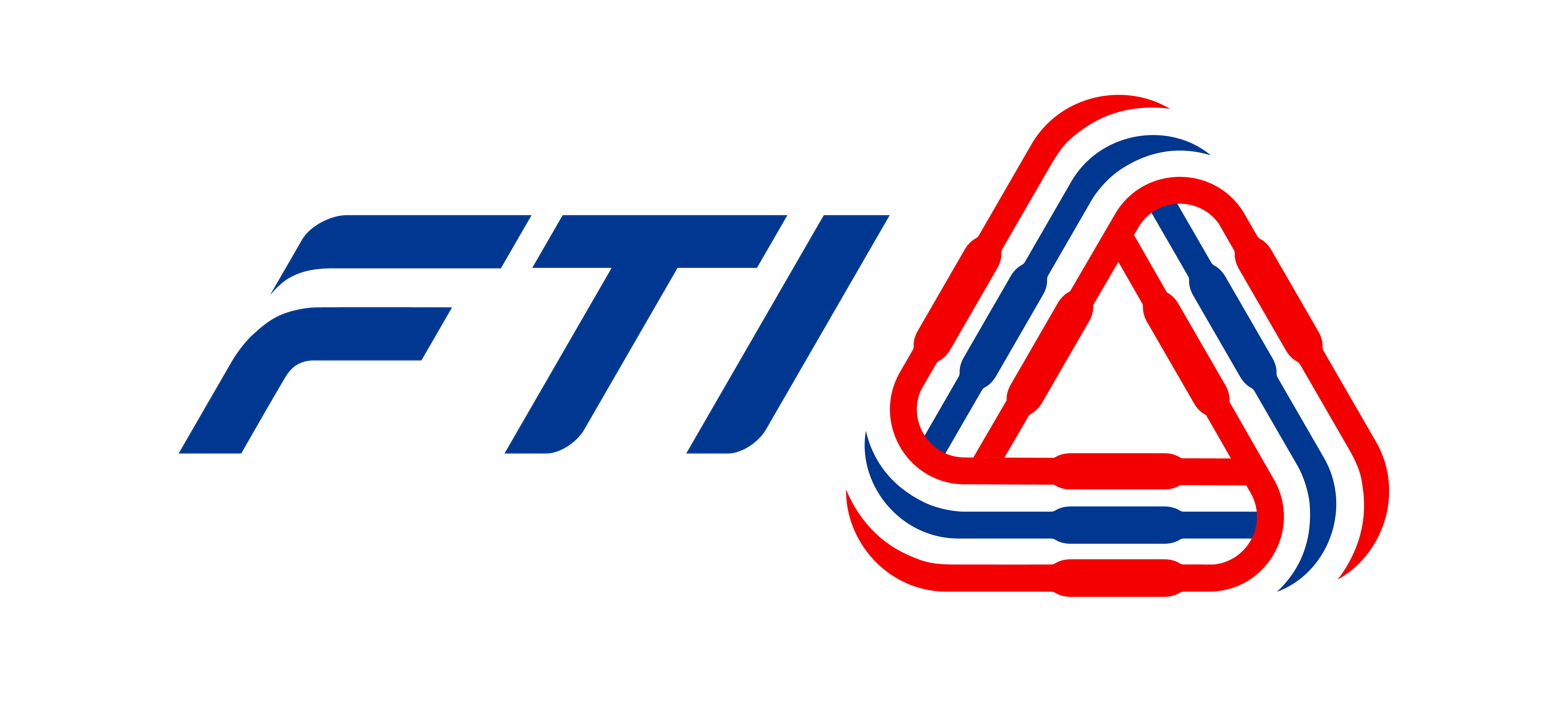
- Nickname: FTI
- Predecessor: Association of Thai Industries (1967–1987)
- Merged into: 1987
- Formation: 29 December 1987
- Type: Industry association
- Legal status: Nonprofit organization
- Purpose: Promote Thai industry
- Headquarters: Bangkok, Thailand
- Website: www.fti.or.th

Federation of Thai Industries (FTI) also formerly known as the Association of Thai Industries (ATI), came into existence on 13 November 1967, and was upgraded on 29 December 1987. It was a transformed body of ATI, which was created in 1967. FTI is a private sector organisation that brings together industrial leaders to promote Thailand's economic development. The main objectives of FTI are to represent Thai manufacturers at both national and international levels, to help promote and develop industrial enterprises, to work with the government in setting up national policies, and to offer consulting services to members.

FTI cooperates with the government to mobilize Thai industries to reach international markets. It acts as a "matchmaker" between foreign industrialists and Thai resources which combine the financial strength, planning ability, and persuasive power of Thailand's industrialists.
