= Environmental issues in Thailand =

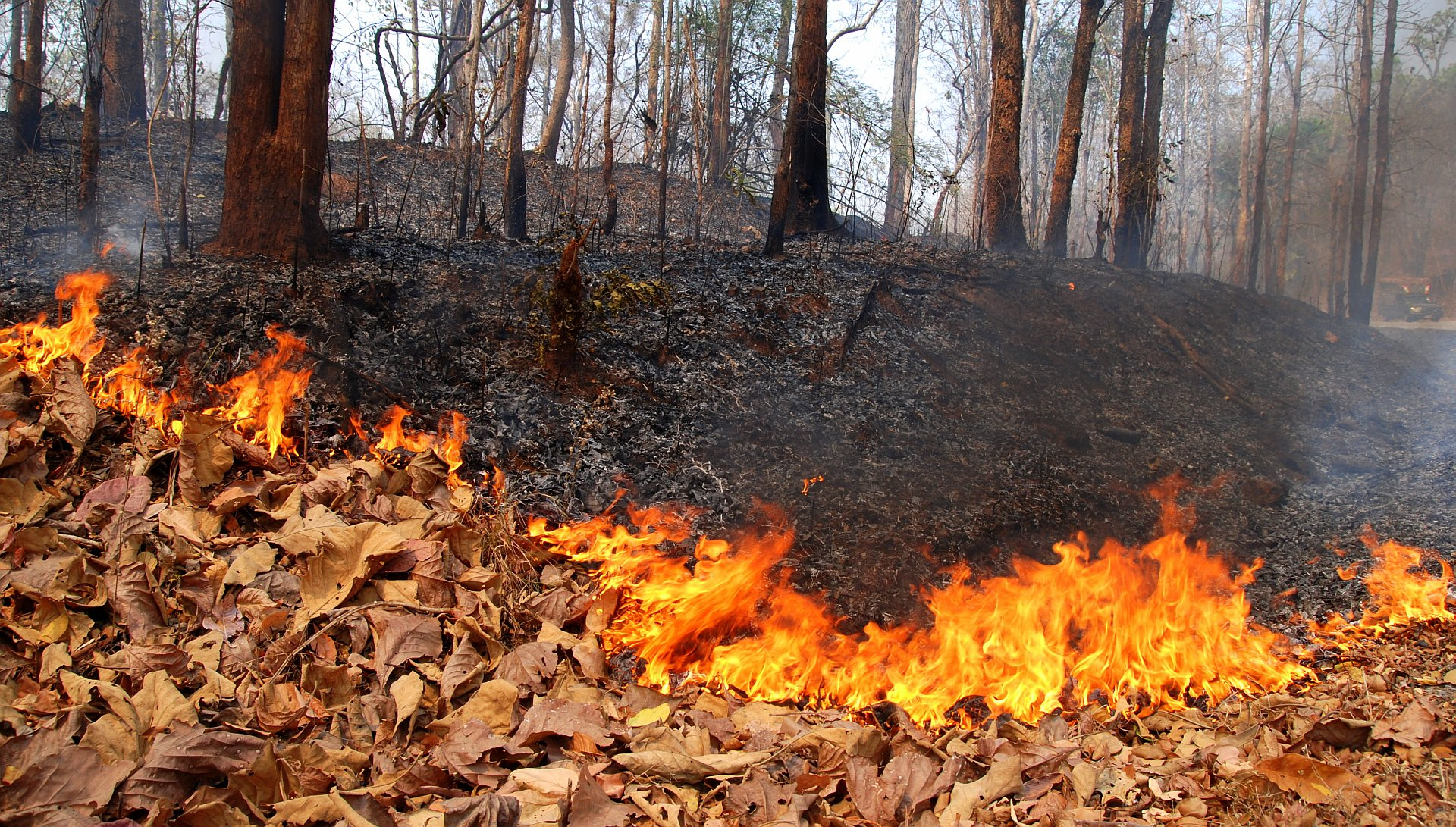
Forest fire, Mae Hong Son Province, March 2010

Thailand's dramatic economic growth has caused numerous environmental issues. The country faces problems with air, declining wildlife populations, deforestation, soil erosion, water scarcity, and waste issues. According to a 2004 indicator, the cost of air and water pollution for the country scales up to approximately 1.6–2.6% of GDP per year. As such, Thailand's economic growth has come at great cost in damage to its people and environment.

Thailand's Twelfth National Economic and Social Development Plan (2017-2021) warns that, "At present the country's natural resources and environmental quality are deteriorating, and have become a weakness in maintaining the basis of production, services and sustainable living. A large volume of the natural resources stock has been utilized for development, resulting in their continuous degradation. The forests have been depleted, the soil has become infertile, and biodiversity has been threatened. While exhibiting a future risk of water shortages, the existing supply of water has not been able to meet the demands of the various sectors. Conflicts over the use of natural resources stem from the unfair allocation of access and exploitation. Moreover, environmental problems have risen along with economic growth and urbanization. All of these problems have affected the quality of life and have added greater economic costs."

== Climate change ==
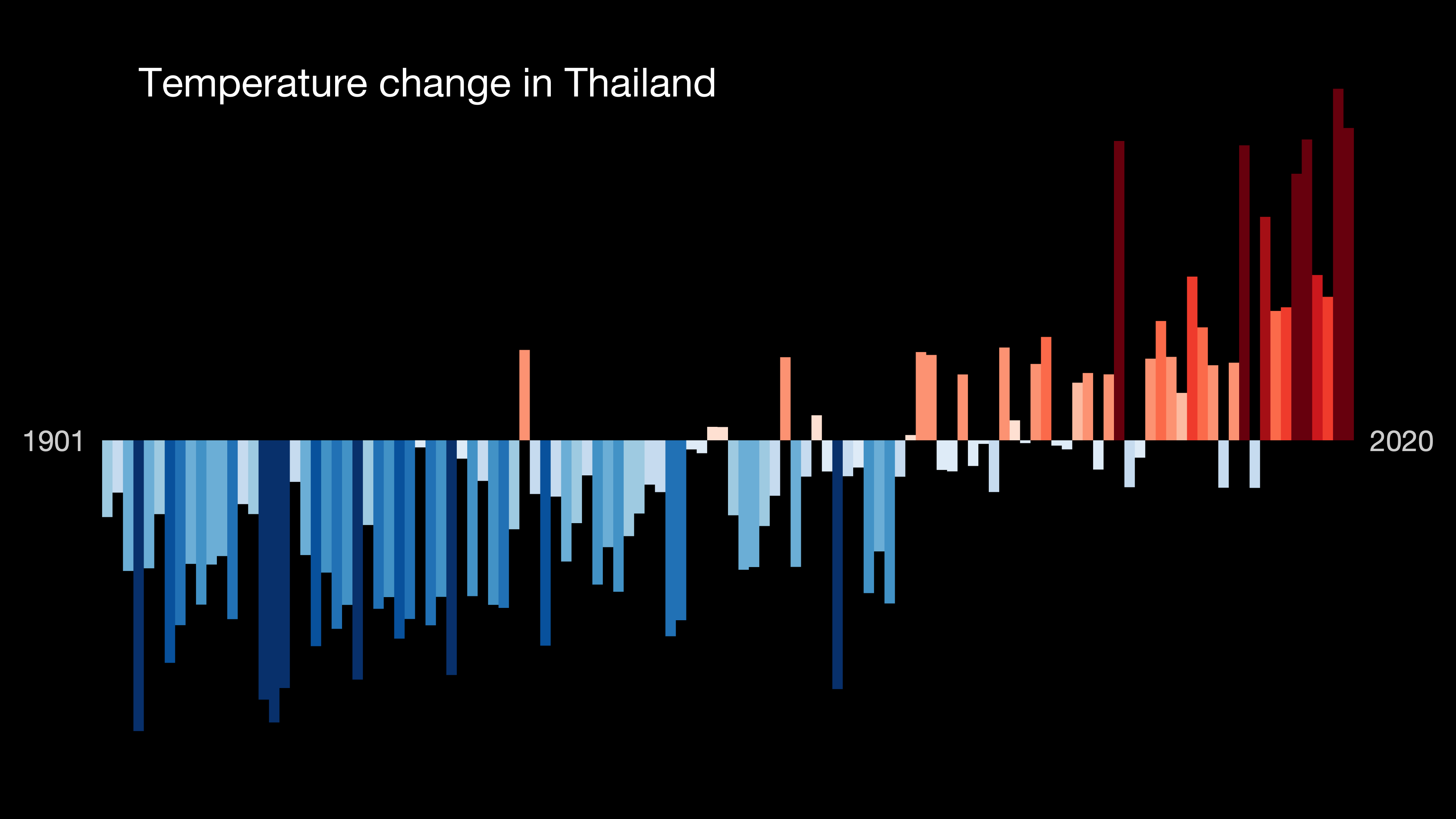
Graph showing temperature change in Thailand between 1901 and 2021

Since the 20th century, climate change has caused temperatures in Thailand to increase. Thailand is considered highly vulnerable to the effects of climate change. Extreme heat and rising sea levels threaten parts of Thailand, including the capital city of Bangkok. Erosion is considered a major problem due to climate change within the country.

As a signatory to the 2015 Paris Agreement, the Thai government has committed a nationally determined contribution to reduce its annual greenhouse gas emissions by 20–25% by 2030.

== Deforestation ==
Forest cover in Thailand has been greatly reduced as people convert forested land to agriculture, or misappropriate public lands for private use, with related estimates varying. The Sueb Nakhasathien Foundation reports that 53% of Thailand was covered by forest in 1961, but that forested areas had shrunk to 31.6% in 2015. An estimate by the World Wildlife Fund concluded that between 1973 and 2009, Thailand's forests declined by 43%. During the period 2001–2012, Thailand lost one million hectares of forest, while restoring 499,000 hectares. Between 1990 and 2005, Thailand lost 9.1% of its forest cover, or around 1,445,000 hectares. As of 2016, Thailand has an average annual deforestation rate of 0.72%. Wetlands have been converted to rice paddies and urban sprawl. With government measures in place to prohibit logging, deforestation rates have dropped, but the impacts of deforestation are still being felt.

Thai government numbers show an increase in the extent of Thai forests. Figures from the Center for Agricultural Information of Thailand's Ministry of Agriculture and Cooperatives show an increase in the extent of Thailand's forested area over the period 2006-2015 (from 99 million rai to 103 million rai), with decreases in every other type of land use. In 2019, the Forest Department said that forest cover has steadily increased due to its anti-encroachment measures under the regime's reclaim forest land policy. According to the department, the country's forest areas in 2018 covered 102.4 million rai, a 330,000-rai increase from the previous year. The increase, equivalent to an area the size of Phuket, increases forest coverage to 31.58% of the country's total land.

In early-2017, the government reaffirmed its 1975 commitment to increase its forest cover to 40% within 20 years. The aim was to have "conserved forests" blanket 25% of the nation and 15% blanketed by "commercial forests". To achieve this goal in 2018, Thailand would need to convert 27 million rai into forests. Thailand has three square meters of green area per capita. Singapore has 66 m^{2} per capita and Malaysia, 44 m^{2}.

In November 1988, heavy rains washed away the soil of newly deforested slopes, causing massive floods. Villages and agricultural land were swamped, and almost 400 people and thousands of domestic animals were killed. The Thai government banned logging on 14 January 1989, revoking all logging concessions. Consequences included the price of timber tripling in Bangkok, in turn increasing illegal logging.

In June 2015, as a severe drought gripped northeastern Thailand, Prime Minister Prayut Chan-o-cha urged farmers to forgo a second rice crop in order to save water. He attributed the drought to massive deforestation. At least 26 million rai (4.2m ha) of forested land, especially forests in the mountainous north, had been denuded, according to the prime minister, who said that forests were needed for the generation of rainfall.

In July 2015, a Bangkok Post editorial summed up Thailand's forestry issues: "Forests have rapidly declined under state policies over the past four decades. Factors include logging, mining, anti-insurgency strategies, promotion of cash crops on the highlands, construction of big dams and promotion of the tourism industry. Corruption is also deep-rooted in forestry bureaucracy." Valuable hardwood tree species, such as Siamese Rosewood, are being extracted illegally for sale, mostly to the Chinese furniture market. These trees are so valuable that poachers are armed and are prepared fight forest rangers. Both rangers and poachers have been killed in gunfights. The rates of logging now threaten the Siamese Rosewood with extinction within 10 years, according to Al Jazeera in 2014.

=== Mangroves and beach erosion ===
Deforestation creates a host of environmental problems: soil erosion, sedimentation of rivers, and loss of natural habitat. Wetlands and mangroves in coastal areas have been seriously degraded by expansion of commercial fishing, shrimp aquaculture, industry, and tourism, causing much of Thailand's biodiversity losses. Mangrove wetlands are among the leading habitats in carbon sequestration, and degradation of these habitats poses risks to global carbon accumulation. They are hypothesized to dampen the intensity of tsunami force, which would protect both human and biodiversity interests. It is estimated that Thailand in 1961 had 3,500 km^{2} of mangrove forests. By 2004 that number was less than 2,000 km^{2} according to the Thai government.

According to Thailand's deputy transport minister, some of Thailand's attractive beaches may be lost within ten years. "If we don't do anything, there will be no attractive beaches left", he said. The marine department, part of the transport ministry, manages Thailand's 3,000 km of shoreline in 23 coastal provinces. Some 670 km of shoreline exhibits severe erosion, with land being lost to the sea at a rate of more than five metres per year. To combat erosion, sections of Pattaya Beach in Chonburi Province are being topped up with more than 300,000 m^{3} of sand at a cost of 429 million baht. A two kilometer stretch of Chalatat Beach in Songkhla is being restored at a cost of 300 million baht.

Thailand had a 2018 Forest Landscape Integrity Index mean score of 6.00/10, ranking it 88th globally out of 172 countries.

While conservationists have advocated for creation of marine protected areas in mangrove forests, coastal communities in Thailand are concerned these protections may interfere with their economic growth. Mangroves provide these communities with profit opportunities, mainly through agriculture and tourism practices including the operation of rubber plantations, aquaculture, and fishing. The Thailand central government has enacted stricter, community-based mangrove restoration laws which shift emphasis from regulating mangrove removal to promoting mangrove conservation. This initiative provides flexibility for local government to approach mangrove conservation efforts as they see fit, which has proved successful for communities in the Phuket, Phang Nga, and Trang provinces. Communities without the financial means to enact these recent policy changes rely on private entities to fund restoration efforts. Another solution to satisfy environmental and economic concerns may be payment for ecosystem services (PES), a method of conservation that incentivizes sustainable environmental practices. PES helps support communities transitioning to sustainable practices, however a lack of funding challenges wide scale support for PES and its implementation.

== Air pollution ==
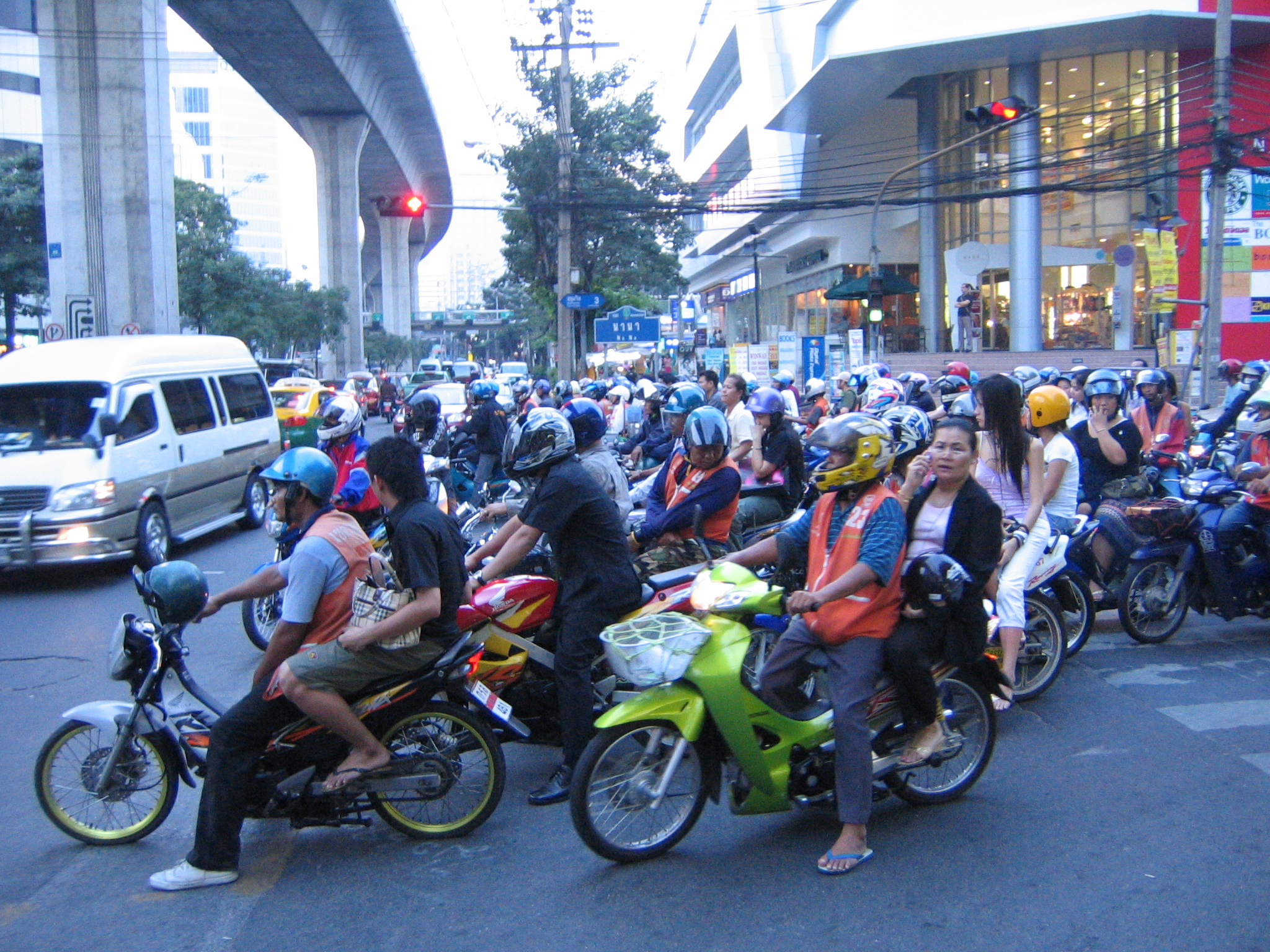
Motorbikes, Nana intersection, Bangkok

The World Bank estimates that deaths in Thailand attributable to air pollution have risen from 31,000 in 1990 to roughly 49,000 in 2013.

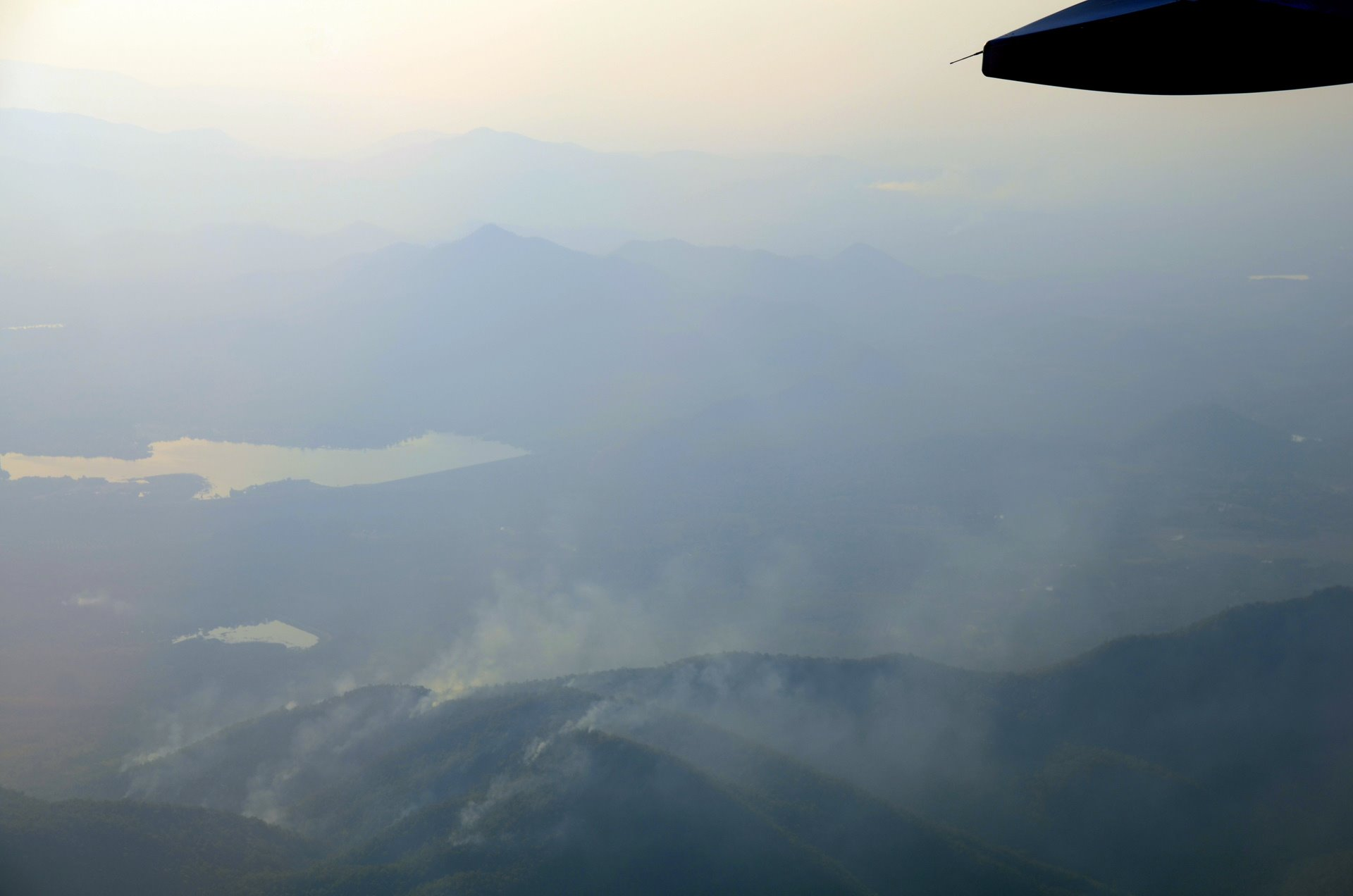
Wildfires in the Khun Tan Range, Mae Tha District, Lamphun. Every year mountain forests are set on fire by farmers to increase the yield of the valuable fungus Astraeus odoratus

Industrial growth has created high levels of air pollution in Thailand. Vehicles and factories contribute to air pollution, particularly in Bangkok, which experienced high levels of air pollution in the winter of 2019. Recent research (2019) points to agricultural burning as the root cause of PM 2.5 pollution in Thailand. PM 2.5 is a measurement of particulates in the atmosphere smaller than 2.5 microns.

The Bangkok metropolitan region, which consists of the Bangkok Metropolitan Administration (BMA) and the four surrounding provinces (Nonthaburi, Pathum Thani, Nakhon Pathom, and Samut Prakan), holds about 20% of the national population and over half of the country's factories. Due to a lack of treatment facilities, increasing volumes of hazardous substances generated by industrial activities have caused serious dumping issues. Unless treatment facilities are built and institutions starts to regulate strictly, environmental contamination caused by hazardous waste threatens to become Thailand's worst environmental problem in the future.

Thailand's Pollution Control Department (PCD) and other agencies have developed standards in order to reduce air pollution. The standards focus on shifting to lower-emissions vehicle engines and improving public transportation. In 1999, 80% of the motorcycles on the road in Bangkok had environmentally unfriendly two-stroke engines. Diesel trucks and buses also contribute many pollutants. In most areas of the country, air pollutants for vehicles are now within acceptable levels according to national standards.

Factories and power plants have been required to reduce emissions. In 2002, Bangkok and the rest of the central region contributed between 60 and 70% of the country's industrial emissions. Most power plants rely on burning fossil fuels. Other sources of air pollution include garbage burning, open cooking, and agricultural burning practices, including deliberate forest fires.

Agricultural burning in Southeast Asia often creates haze. In 2003 Thailand ratified the ASEAN Agreement on Transboundary Haze Pollution to reduce the haze from forest fires, but issues throughout the region are still common. Wildfires are started by local farmers during the dry season in northern Thailand for a variety of purposes, with February and March as the two months when conditions are at their worst. In research conducted between 2005 and 2009 in Chiang Mai, average PM10 rates during these months were found to be well above the country's safety level of 120 μg/m^{3} (microgrammes per cubic metre), peaking at 383 μg/m^{3} on 14 March 2007. They are the main cause of the intense air pollution in the Thai highlands and contribute to the floods in the country by completely denuding forest undergrowth. The dry forest soil leads to lower water intake for trees to extract when the rains arrive.

In February 2016, Director-General Chatchai Promlert of the Disaster Prevention and Mitigation Department, said that the haze affecting northern Thailand has reached levels that can be considered harmful to health. He said that the Pollution Control Department had reported that the levels of particulates measuring less than 10 micrometres—known as PM10—had crossed the prescribed safe threshold of 120 in four out of nine provinces where monitoring was conducted. The level of PM10 in the nine regions—Chiang Rai, Chiang Mai, Lampang, Lamphun, Mae Hong Son, Nan, Phrae, Phayao and Tak—was measured at between 68 and 160. The haze level was considered unhealthy in Chiang Mai, Lampang, Lamphun, and Phrae Provinces.

During the burning season 2016 (February–April), air pollution has shown no improvement despite the government's purported efforts to ameliorate the burning. The Mae Sai District of Chiang Rai Province recorded a record 410 μg/m^{3} of harmful air particles in the early morning of 25 March 2016.

From January–July 2016 the five Thai cities with the highest annual average concentrations of PM2.5 were Chiang Mai, Lampang (Mae Moh), Khon Kaen, Bangkok and Ratchaburi. Seven out of the eleven cities measured (63.6%) did not reach the National Ambient Air Quality Standard annual limit of 25 μg/m^{3} for PM2.5 and all 11 cities measured did not reach the World Health Organization (WHO) guideline annual limit of 25 μg/m^{3}. Thailand's national air quality standards are weak when compared to WHO recommendations. In the first six months of 2017, Greenpeace Thailand monitored PM2.5 in 14 provinces, as they have done since 2015, and found that every station recorded levels higher than the WHO recommendation of less than 10 milligrams per cubic meter of air. PM2.5 refers to airborne particulates smaller than 2.5 microns, particles so small that they can be inhaled into the blood system and cause cancer and heart disease. Chiang Mai, Tak, Khon Kaen, Bangkok, and Saraburi were among the worst cities with the highest PM2.5 levels in 2017.

In February 2018 and 2019, Bangkok suffered under a haze of smog and ultra-fine dust. The Pollution Control Department issued warnings that particulate levels had soared to 94 micrograms per cubic metre of air in some areas, almost double the safe limit of 50 mcg. Residents were urged to wear N95 or KN95 protective dust masks. Bangkok City Hall reassured residents that conditions will "permanently improve" in 11 years (2029) with the launch of many new and improved modes of public transport. Bangkok City Hall failed to mention that it is constructing 1,047 km of new roads due to be completed by 2029 or that in the decade 2008 to 2018 the number of cars registered in Bangkok rose from 5.9 million to 10.2 million. In January 2019, Bangkok authorities employed cloud seeding to ease air pollution in parts of the city. That month, high-pressure cannons were blasted around Bangkok's City Hall and other areas to combat the smog, leading to debate as to whether the method was effective at washing away the particularly harmful smaller particles. In January 2020, a National Institute for Development Administration survey showed that "81% of the 1,256 local residents questioned agreed that the [Thai] government" was ineffective at solving Bangkok's air pollution, with 2.7% of respondents approving the government's efforts.

=== Field and forest burning ===
Fires in Thailand fall into three main categories: forest fires, agricultural burning, and roadside burning.

Forest fires are set deliberately, as they are thought to increase forest product yields, especially the earth star mushroom (Astraeus hygrometricus (Pers.) Morgan; เห็ดถอบ hed thob or เห็ดเผาะ hed phor in Thai), which has seasonal availability and a high market price. In order to collect these fungi, local farmers use fire either to clear the forest floor to make it easier to find the mushroom or because fire is thought to stimulate the growth of this mushroom. The burning of agricultural fields and forested areas in Southeast Asia is a yearly event, mainly during the "burning season", January through March. It is particularly widespread in the northern and northeastern provinces of Thailand. Northern Thailand has the highest rates of lung cancer in the country. The incidence of other chest diseases and cardiac conditions is also high.

According to the Bangkok Post, corporations in the agricultural sector, not farmers, are the biggest contributors to smoke pollution. The main source of the fires is forested area being cleared to make room for new crops. The new crops to be planted after the smoke clears are not rice and vegetables to feed locals. A single crop is responsible: maize. The haze problem began in 2007 and has been traced at the local level and at the macro-market level to the growth of the animal feed business. "The true source of the haze ... sits in the boardrooms of corporations eager to expand production and profits. A chart of Thailand's growth in world corn markets can be overlaid on a chart of the number of fires. It is no longer acceptable to scapegoat hill tribes and slash-and-burn agriculture for the severe health and economic damage caused by this annual pollution." These data have been ignored by the government. The end is not in sight, as the number of fires has increased every year for a decade, and data show more pollution in late-February 2016 than in late-February 2015.

Charoen Pokphand (CP) Group, Thailand's largest agro-industrial and food conglomerate, and the leading purchaser of northern maize, in March 2016 announced an "agricultural social enterprise" to steer Nan Province's Pua District villagers away from maize farming. CP Group has incurred criticism for the way it purchases maize harvests for animal feed from farmers in Nan and other provinces. Suphachai Chearavanont, vice-chairman of CP Group, said that corn planters will be encouraged to grow cash crops such as coffee, which requires less farmland and makes a higher profit than maize. Not only will this address deforestation, he said, but it will also help reduce the spring haze in the north which is caused by slash-and-burn practices to prepare land for the next maize season. Chearavanont said crops like coffee take about 3½ years to show a yield, but stated that CP Group would stand by farmers and provide assistance in the meantime.

The Thai government has encouraged farmers to abandon rice farming and cultivate sugarcane instead. As a consequence, fields planted in sugarcane have soared from 6.8 million rai in harvest year 2008–2009 to 11.5 million rai in 2017–2018. Sugarcane fields are a major locus of open fires. Despite anti-burning regulations, 66% of the sugarcane that entering processing mills in 2019 had been burned prior to harvesting.

"Cheap and fast" is a shorthand explanation for the intentional use of fire to clear overgrown roadsides and open areas. Cattle herders also burn areas to stimulate the growth of Imperata grass which is able to quickly produce new leaves during the hot-dry season. New leaves produced on burnt areas have a higher nutrient value, which is perfect for cattle grazing. Roadside fires are set to clear vegetation from encroaching on roadways. Fires produce large amounts of smoke which stagnates low lying areas, causing eye irritation and respiratory ailments. Large areas of degraded forest are destroyed by fire each year.

== Fisheries ==
=== Overfishing ===
In 1950, the newly constituted Food and Agriculture Organization (FAO) of the United Nations estimated that, globally, Thailand was catching about 20 million metric tons of fish (cod, mackerel, tuna) and invertebrates (lobster, squid, clams). That catch peaked at 90 million tons per year in the late-1980s, and it has been declining ever since. Thailand is no exception to this decline, despite having had 57,141 fishing vessels and more than 300,000 people employed by the fishing industry. According to the Thai Department of Fisheries, Thailand had 11,000 registered trawlers and "about" 2,000 illegal trawlers (2016). In 2018 Thailand completed its first-ever census of fishing boats permitted to catch fish in Thai waters: 10,743.

The sheer number of Thai fishing vessels is a key contributor to overfishing. Even the president of the Thai Tuna Industry Association (TTIA), Chanintr Chalisarapong, acknowledges this. "You don't need to be a scientist to know that we're overfishing,..." said Chalisarapong. "We have to stop building new boats. Catch has to come from local fishermen using pole and line methods....We need to have less [sic] boats and less gear." Thailand has made progress in this area: As of February 2018 Thailand's fishing fleet numbers 38,956, down from 50,023 in 2015, a 22% reduction.

Thailand is a peninsular country of 514,000 km^{2} with over 3,565 km of coastline, 2,700 km on the Gulf of Thailand and 865 km on the Andaman Sea. Its exclusive economic zone extends over 306,000 km^{2}. Historically, fish from Thailand's off-shore waters have been a significant provider of protein to the population. In 2001, the average yearly fish consumption was 32.4 kg per capita and provided on average 10–14 grams of protein per capita per day. It provides 40.5% of animal protein sources and 17.6% of total protein. Consumption of fish is almost certainly higher than reported as many fish are caught by smallholders and consumed without passing through the marketplace. But numbers are dwindling: small-scale fishers were able to catch up to eight times as much fish in the 1980s than possible in the 2000s.

Thailand's marine fish resources are over-exploited. Thailand's marine capture averaged 2,048,753 tonnes from 2003 to 2012; in 2014 the catch was 1,559,746 tonnes, a decrease of 23.9%. The catch per unit of effort (CPUE) has decreased markedly. Average catches in Thai waters have fallen by 86% since the industry's large expansion in the 1960s. In 2014, Thailand was 12th in the world (of 215 nations) (1=worst, 215=best) in terms of fish species at risk (96 species).

The over-exploitation of fish stocks in Thailand has led to the creation of a huge aquaculture industry, human trafficking to man fishing vessels voyaging ever further out to sea, and the depletion of "trash fish" as well as marketable juvenile fish to feed the increasing demand for fish meal for farmed shrimp. The wisdom of using captured fish to feed domesticated fish is dubious, according to a researcher. "Using fishmeal in aquaculture,...is not ecologically sustainable because we are still relying on wild-caught fish as an input for farmed fish, so producing more farmed fish as a solution to food security does not lessen the pressure on wild-caught fish."

A twelve-month analysis of the catch composition, landing patterns, and biological aspects of sharks caught by Thai commercial fishing boats in the Andaman Sea off Thailand showed a significant difference from the results of a similar study done in 2004. Sixty-four species were observed in the 2004 study, but only 17 in the most recent. Largely absent were slow-growing, late–maturing, low-fecundity species. Their absence suggests that the populations of these groups of apex predators may be close to collapse.

Thai surimi production has fallen from around 100,000 tonnes in 2012 to just over 52,000 tonnes in 2017. Fish prices for the species from which tropical surimi is typically made—itoyori, eso, flying fish, sea bream, and ribbonfish—are rising in spite of stable low wages. Surimi expert Jae Park of Oregon State University says of Thai surimi fish: "They're overharvested, they're really overharvested".

One response of the government has been a program to buy back 1,300 sub-standard trawlers to reduce overfishing. Thailand has 10,500 registered commercial trawlers. The 1,300 boats to be purchased by the government failed licensing standards after the government imposed more stringent, environmentally friendly laws. The cabinet in December 2017 approved the buyback to pacify boat owners. Buyback costs are equivalent to 40,000 baht per gross ton, equating to 400,000 baht to 2.4 million baht per boat. As of August 2018 the government has not disbursed buyback funds. The National Fisheries Association of Thailand says its members will stop fishing unless the government pays for the 1,300 decommissioned trawlers. On 3 August 2018, the Fisheries Department announced that it would buy-back 680 unlicensed fishing boats for three billion baht.

Climate change poses a serious threat to the sustainability of the fisheries industry in the ASEAN region including Thailand.

=== Illegal fishing ===
On 21 April 2015 the European Commission threatened Thailand, the third-largest seafood exporter in the world, with a trade ban if it did not take action on illegal fishing. The EU, the world's largest importer of fish products, since 2010 has taken action against countries that do not follow international overfishing regulations, such as policing their waters for unlicensed fishing vessels and imposing penalties to deter illegal fishing. Thailand has failed to certify the origin and legality of its fish exports to the EU and now has six months, until October 2015, to implement a satisfactory action plan to address the shortcomings. EU fisheries commissioner Karmenu Vella declared that, "Analyzing what is actually happening in Thailand, we noticed that there are no controls whatsoever, there are no efforts whatsoever." The EU imported 145,907 tons of fish products worth €642 million from Thailand in 2014. In the view of the Bangkok Post, "The [Thai] fisheries bureaucracy's record is extremely shabby, resulting in a breakdown in state regulation of commercial trawlers. Fisheries officials are also known to have cozy relationships with trawler operators."

In a press release dated 21 April 2016, the European Commission updated its assessment of Thailand's progress, saying, "The dialogue is proving difficult and there remain serious concerns about the steps taken by Thailand to fight IUU [illegal, unreported and unregulated] fishing activities. This means that further action by the Commission cannot be ruled out. A meeting with the Thai authorities in May [2016] will be a new opportunity for them to show their good will and commitment." In addition to Thailand's illegal fishing concerns, what is often overlooked are abusive labor practices. The labor abuses, often referred to as sea slavery, involve the trafficking of workers onto fishing boats quite frequently in the form of force, fraud, or coercion, including debt bondage. The problem of sea slavery is connected to environmental concerns in this and other fleets because overfishing of near-shore stocks have caused a collapse in the number of fish, resulting in fishing boats needing to go further out at sea to catch bare minimum quotas. The price of venturing further from shore has given rise to a dependence on forced debt bonded or captive labor as a cost-saving measure.

=== Fishing practices ===
The Thai Department of Marine and Coastal Resources reported that the deaths of "400 rare marine animals" in 2017 were due to destructive fishing practices and equipment. Of the death toll, 57% were sea turtles, 38% dolphins and whales, and five percent dugongs. Fishing gear was the major cause, followed by disease and pollution. The death toll has hovered around 400 for three consecutive years and represents less than 10% of the 5,000 rare species found in Thailand's territorial waters. The department estimates that there are around 2,000 dolphins and whales, 3,000 sea turtles, and 250 dugongs living in Thai waters. All are protected as rare species.

Sharks were once common in Thai waters. Marine scientists now say that they may be close to collapse. Researchers examined bycatch on returning fishing boats at several Thai ports over a year. They discovered a sharp decline in the shark population. They also noted shifts in population composition compared to a previous study in 2004. They managed to count 2,123 sharks, and recorded only 17 species, compared with 64 species reported in 2004. In Thailand, sharks are often caught as bycatch when other species are being targeted. Bycatch in Thailand is largely unregulated, leaving, for example, only about 100 whale sharks in Thai waters, according to the Department of Coastal and Marine Resources. Thailand has been attempting to protect the species following an international commitment, the "International Plan of Action for Conservation and Management of Sharks", initiated by the Food and Agriculture Organization (FAO). It has been developing the "National Plan of Action for Conservation and Management of Sharks", but it is not yet implemented as of 2018.

The period from 2012 to 2016 saw Thailand export 22,467 tons of shark fins, the primary ingredient in shark fin soup—a Chinese dish signifying wealth and privilege—making it the world's leading exporter. As of 2017, 52 nations have implemented some form of ban on shark finning or fishing. Twelve countries have banned shark fishing altogether. But Indonesia, Malaysia, and Thailand still permit shark fishing. A study commissioned by WildAid, found that 57% of urban Thais have consumed shark fin at some point and 61% plan to consume shark fin in the future. More than 100 Bangkok restaurants serve shark fin soup

== Waste management ==
When Thailand was a rural, agrarian society, garbage was of no concern as everything was made of natural products such as banana leaves. Waste could be discarded to decompose naturally. Today, according to one observer, "...it would not be an exaggeration to say that every locality in the country is...mired in its own garbage." Thailand's Pollution Control Department (PCD) estimates that each Thai produces a daily average of 1.15 kg of solid waste, amounting to over 73,000 tonnes daily nationwide. According to Interior Ministry statistics, refuse nationwide in 2016 amounted to 27 million tonnes, up about 0.7% from the previous year. Of this, 4.2 million tonnes was generated in Bangkok. Thailand had 2,490 dump sites in 2014, but only 466 of them were of sanitary landfill caliber. Twenty-eight million tonnes of waste were left unprocessed. Bangkok's canals are awash in sewage, but also serve as dump sites. After recent severe flooding, tonnes of refuse blocked water gates, preventing drainage. At one water gate, more than five tonnes of debris had accumulated, consisting of everything from everyday consumer product waste to large items such as mattresses and furniture.

=== Organic waste ===
The PCD estimates that in 2017 organic waste collected by municipalities across Thailand accounted for nearly two-thirds of the country's total waste output: a reported 7.6 million tonnes— 64%—of the refuse collected was organic waste. It is thought that a significant portion of this waste is not merely fruit and vegetable peelings, but edible surplus food. This in a nation where 400,000 to 600,000 children may be undernourished due to poverty, yet ten percent of all children are obese. Prevailing attitudes do not encompass composting or waste sorting: 64 percent of the Thai population do not sort their rubbish according to one study.

=== Plastic waste ===
As of 2015, Thailand generated two million tonnes of plastic waste. One quarter of that (500,000 tonnes) is reused. Thais throw away 45 billion single-use plastic bags per year, 12% of all household waste. Wet markets are the source of 18 billion plastic bags. Grocery and department stores each account for 13.5 billion bags.

Thailand's Pollution Control Department (PCD) estimates that plastic waste in the country is increasing at an annual rate of 12%, or around two million tonnes per year. And yet, Thailand imported 480,000 tonnes of plastic garbage from abroad in 2018, and is set to import an additional 220,000 tonnes before existing contracts expire in September 2020.

Increasingly, plastic is the scourge of Bangkok's network of storm water pumping stations, clogging pumps during seasonal downpours and regularly turning thoroughfares into muddy rivers. Thailand is considered to be one of the world's largest consumers of plastic bags. Government figures suggest that the average Thai uses eight plastic bags a day. In contrast, the average person in France uses around 80 a year. In a 2015 report, the conservation group Ocean Conservancy estimated that just five countries—China, Indonesia, Philippines, Vietnam, and Thailand—were responsible for over half of plastic waste dumped into the ocean. Mr Narong Ruengsri, head of Bangkok's drainage department, said removing plastic from the canals and drainage system is a constant battle. "Every day we go fish out around 2,000 tons of waste from the drainage channels," he told AFP. Official figures show the 11,500 tonnes of garbage Bangkok produces each day, at least one tonne of which is plastic, is growing by 10% a year. Officially, only 16% is recycled.

The PCD estimates that Thailand consumes 4.4 billion plastic water bottles per year. Sixty percent of containers are capped with plastic wrap covering the cap, an unnecessary feature in the eyes of the PCD and due to be phased out by 2019. The cap seals alone contribute 520 tonnes of plastic per year to the environment. In February 2018 the PCD reached agreement with five leading water bottlers to cease using plastic cap seals by 1 April 2018, with all other bottlers to follow by 2019. The Environment Ministry claims that Thailand's 24 coastal provinces produce 10 million tonnes of waste per year. Ten percent of that finds its way into the sea.

In February 2017, a 10 kilometer-long patch of plastic refuse was found floating off Chumphon Province. The Thai Marine and Coastal Resources Department has noted that at least 300 sea animals on average—60 per cent of which are whales and dolphins—die from eating plastic fishing gear and trash each year. Filter feeding invertebrates tested off the coast of Chonburi Province showed high levels of microplastics, leading the authors to warn that, "Health risks are possible when people consume these contaminated marine organisms, particularly shellfish."

In May 2018 a juvenile pilot whale in southern Thailand beached and died. An autopsy revealed the creature had consumed 80 plastic bags weighing eight kilograms. A rescue attempt failed to save the whale. A marine biologist from Kasetsart University, said the bags made it impossible for the whale to eat any nutritious food. "If you have 80 plastic bags in your stomach, you die," he said. At least 300 marine animals including pilot whales, sea turtles and dolphins perish each year in Thai waters after ingesting plastic.

In June 2018, all Thai governmental agencies committed to reducing use of plastic. The move followed Prime Minister General Prayut Chan-o-cha's 17 April order for the Interior Ministry and the Ministry of Natural Resources and Environment to mount a campaign for reduced use of plastic. Its goal is to halve the amount of plastic ocean waste Thailand produces by 2027.

In 2017, the Thai government said that it might tax plastic bags. An "endless debate" ensued in government, but no action. Petrochemical firms maintain that plastic is not an issue if it is reused and recycled. Thai exports of polyethylene pellets and plastic goods amounted to 430 billion baht or five percent of total Thai exports in 2017 according to the Thai Plastic Industries Association. Finally, a ban on single-use plastic bags at major retailers was enacted to take effect on 1 January 2020. The ban exempts, until 2021, the 40% of total volume of single-use bags used at wet markets and restaurants. Bag manufacturers have cried foul, arguing that the solution to plastic pollution is proper disposal of bags and recycling. To make matters worse for the manufacturers, eight TV channels signed an agreement with the Ministry of Natural Resources and Environment on 2 January 2020 to blur images and footage of single-use plastic bags on-screen, as is done in Thailand for firearms, cigarettes, and alcohol.

In 2018, the Thai government awakened fully to the dangers of plastic pollution. The Thai Cabinet banned the use of plastic bags and Styrofoam food containers on the premises of state agencies. Concurrently, the Department of National Parks, Wildlife and Plant Conservation launched a program to ban plastic bags, Styrofoam containers, plastic cutlery, and plastic straws in Thailand's 154 national parks. Park vendors may not use plastics and park visitors will be prohibited from bringing single-use plastic items into the parks.

In April 2019 the Thai Cabinet approved the "Plastic Waste Management Road Map 2018-2030". The plan prohibits the use of microbeads, cap seals, and OXO-degradable plastics by the end of 2019. Four single-use plastics to be prohibited by 2022 are lightweight plastic bags less than 36 microns thick, Styrofoam takeaway food containers, plastic cups, and plastic straws. All plastic used in Thailand by 2027 is to be recycled plastic.

On World Environment Day 2019, 5 June, the Pollution Control Department (PCD) said that the first year of the country's effort to reduce plastic waste has been a success. It claimed an 80% reduction in the plastic wrap used to keep dust off plastic water bottle caps. The Environment Ministry has created a National Roadmap to Tackle Plastic Waste, 2018-2030. PCD data shows that 0.5 million tonnes of plastic waste in Thailand was recycled in 2018 of the total two million tonnes of plastic waste generated.

In April 2019, Marium, an abandoned and ailing baby dugong washed up on a beach in southern Thailand. She was found to be suffering from an infection exacerbated by ingesting plastic waste. Overnight, she became the nation's sweetheart. Authorities did everything in their power to save her. In August, she died. Within a day the environment minister announced a national dugong conservation master plan named "Marium Action". Marium's body would be preserved for educational and awareness-raising purposes and 17 August was proposed as National Dugong Day. New dudong conservation zones were proposed. The prime minister pledged to "leave no one behind, including animals". In the same appearance, the prime minister delayed a ban on single-use plastic bags until 2022.

Finally, a ban on single-use plastic bags at major retailers was enacted. taking effect on 1 January 2020. The ban exempts, until 2021, the 40% of total volume of single-use bags used at wet markets and restaurants. Bag manufacturers have cried foul, arguing that the solution to plastic pollution is proper disposal of bags and recycling. To make matters worse for the manufacturers, eight TV channels signed an agreement with the Ministry of Natural Resources and Environment on 2 January 2020 to blur images and footage of single-use plastic bags on-screen, as is done in Thailand for firearms, cigarettes, and alcohol. Concomitantly, Thailand imported 480,000 tonnes of plastic garbage from abroad in 2018, and is set to import an additional 220,000 tonnes before existing contracts expire in September 2020. Between 2014 and 2018 Thailand imported 906,521 tonnes of plastic from 81 countries, according to the Commerce Ministry. Plastic imports nearly doubled between 2018 and 2019 due to increased Chinese imports.

=== Electronic waste ===
Thailand is a signatory to the Basel Convention, which prohibits the transnational movement of hazardous waste. The Thai government—sometimes acting through free-trade agreements—circumvents the convention, using legal techniques to skirt the prohibition and instead import hazardous waste, mostly electronic waste. Thai agencies tasked with preventing negative environmental impacts from e-waste have failed to perform their regulatory missions. They have allowed operators of waste management plants to reduce operational costs by disposing of hazardous waste improperly. That has contributed to serious environmental degradation and degraded the health of locals. Thailand legally imports about 53,000 tonnes of e-waste annually. As of 2018 Thailand permits 1,761 factories to manage electronic waste. Of these, 539 are electronic waste recycling plants. Another 1,222 plants dispose of e-waste in land-fills or by incineration. Most of these plants are in Rayong Province, Chonburi Province, and Chachoengsao Province.

In June 2018 Thailand banned all imports of foreign e-waste. China banned the import of foreign e-waste in 2018 also. Since the e-waste ban, 28 new recycling factories, most dealing with e-waste, have opened in Chachoengsao Province. In 2019, 14 businesses in Chachoengsao were granted licenses to process electronic waste, six of them in the Ko Khanun Subdistrict of Phanom Sarakham District. An official of the Basel Action Network, which campaigns against dumping waste in poor countries, said, "E-waste has to go somewhere, and the Chinese are simply moving their entire operations to Southeast Asia. The only way to make money is to get huge volume with cheap, illegal labour and pollute the hell out of the environment," he added.

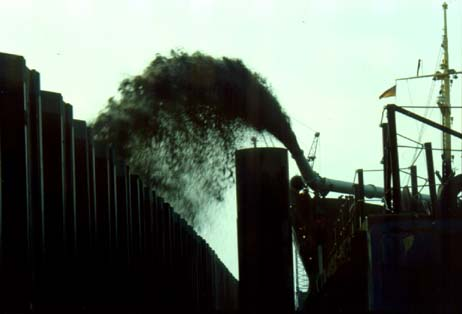
Industrial water pollution

== Water pollution ==
Thailand's Pollution Control Department reports divide the country into five main geographical regions: north, northeast, central, south, and east. In those regions, Thailand has a total of 25 river basins. Thailand's annual rainfall averages around 1,700 mm.

Despite the annual southwest monsoon, Thailand is subject to drought, particularly the northeastern region. As of 2002, Thailand had less water available per person than any other country in Asia, and nearly one-third of its water was "unsuitable for human consumption." According to the Department of Water Resources, national water demand averages 152 billion m^{3} per year against a supply of 112 m^{3}. The agricultural sector accounts for 75% of demand, the industrial sector three percent, households four percent, and preserving ecological systems 18%. Dams and reservoirs supply 66% of water, 15% from surface water sources, and 13% is mined from underground.

Non-potable water is a result of untreated domestic sewage, industrial waste water, and solid hazardous wastes. This is a critical environmental problem for Thailand. According to the Pollution Control Department, the agricultural sector is the largest polluter as the nation's farms discharged up to 39 million m^{3} of wastewater per day in 2016. The industrial sector ranked second, discharging 17.8 million m^{3} per day. The residential sector ranked third with 9.6 million m^{3} per day. Wastewater treatment processes in the residential sector were only 18% effective, while only 52% of wastewater was treated.

=== Surface waters ===
In 2003, Thailand's Pollution Control Department (PCD) monitored the quality of 49 rivers and four lakes in Thailand. Findings revealed that 68% of water bodies surveyed were suitable for agriculture and general consumption. Only less than 40% of Thailand's surface waters were in poor or very poor quality. According to the survey of major rivers and lakes by PCD, no surface water was categorized as "very good" quality (clean water suitable for aquatic animals and human consumption after normal treatment).

Surface water quality varies widely in the different regions in Thailand. Surface water monitored in the northern, central, and southern regions appear to have poor quality, while water in the eastern region was fair. Compared to other regions, the rivers and lakes monitored in the northeastern region had good quality surface water.

In terms of dissolved oxygen (DO), surface water in the northern region ranks the best, approximately 6 mg/L, followed by the northeastern region with DO concentrations of around 4 mg/L. The central, eastern, and central regions rank the lowest, about 2 mg/L. The highest concentration of total coliform bacteria (TCB), among surface waters monitored, was found in the central region with concentrations of TCB higher than 4,000MPN (most probable number)/100mL.

=== Coastal waters ===
In 2003, PCD set up 240 monitoring stations in Thailand's 23 coastal provinces and on significant islands. In 2003, monitoring results showed that coastal water of 68 percent of the stations were in "very good" and "good" quality. Thirty percent of the stations were in "fair" condition and only three percent were in "poor" quality. Compared with past data, coastal water quality was shown to have deteriorated, specifically in the areas into which four main rivers flow. The chief indicators of pollution were DO and TCB.

Water quality in the inner Gulf of Thailand, into which the Chao Phraya, Tha Chin, Pak Panang, and Rayong Rivers and several canals discharge, revealed high concentrations of domestic pollutants. Very low DO levels (0.3, 1.8, 3.5 mg/L) were found in the areas of Klong 12 Thanwa, Mae Klong, and Tha Chin. Additionally, TCB and heavy metal levels appeared to be higher than allowable standards in the same areas. In Bang Pakong District the level of total suspended solids (TSS) appeared to be high.

The western seaboard generally appeared to have "good" water quality. However, TCB levels in some areas where domestic waste water discharged into the sea without treatment exceeded the standard. Water quality in most areas of the eastern seaboard was in "good" condition, except for high levels of total suspended solids and TCB in the areas of Laem Chabang and Map Ta Phut. Despite rapid growth, overall coastal water quality in the Andaman Sea were still in "very good" condition, except for the few areas that revealed concerns of DO and TCB levels.

Water pollution has become obvious in many areas. In 1997, hundreds of thousands of fish and other aquatic life in the Nam Phong River died as a result of industrial pollution. Large amounts of arsenic were found in the groundwater in Nakhon Si Thammarat Province, a result of mining in the area. Pollution affects the marine environment. Red tides, caused by excessive algae growth and a result of pollution, oil spills, and invasive species are some of the factors that are affecting Thailand's marine biodiversity.

Another major source of pollution are the heavy metals that have seeped into the rivers of Thailand. In the Chao Phraya estuary, mercury levels have far exceeded normal standards, and high concentrations of heavy metals on the river bed pose a serious threat to ecosystems.

In March 2017 Associate Professor Thon Thamrongnawasawat, vice dean of the fisheries faculty of Kasetsart University, said, "... there is something terribly wrong with the Thai sea [Gulf of Thailand]." His observation followed on the deaths of two Bruda whales and two whale sharks in the Gulf of Thailand since the beginning of the year. The latest casualty is a 12-metre Bruda whale weighing about two tonnes. It washed ashore in Village Nine of Tambon Thongchai, Bang Saphan District, Prachuap Khiri Khan Province. Earlier, one six-month old Bruda whale was found dead on the beach of Ban Kung Tanod in Tambon Khao Daeng, Kui Buri District of Prachuap Khiri Khan. Two dead whale sharks that washed ashore in the past 70 days were entangled in ropes. As of 2017 there are only an estimated 100 whale sharks and about 50 Bruda whales remaining in the gulf.

Thai coral reefs have been degraded by tourism, sediment from landfills in coastal areas, and polluted water released by beachfront hotels, resorts, and homes. Water contamination is the largest contributor to the degeneration of coral reefs in Thailand, as 70% of polluted water is returned to coastal waters untreated. The damage is exacerbated by plastic trash, which can infect coral and cause long-term harm. As of 2017, 77% of a total of 107,800 rai of coral reefs in Thai seas is "in a sorry state". In 2008, the percentage of degraded reefs was 30%.

=== Groundwaters ===
The Thai governmental agency charged with responsibility for groundwater is the Department of Groundwater Resources, part of the Ministry of Natural Resources and Environment.

Groundwater is mainly recharged by rainfall and seepage streams. Aquifers yield a large amount of water throughout Thailand, with the exception of the eastern region. The largest source of groundwater is found in the lower central region, particularly in the Bangkok Metropolitan Region (BMR) and surrounding provinces, and is being used to meet the growing water demand, growing at 10% annually. The depletion of the water table around Bangkok has led to land subsidence which has exacerbated flooding.

Agricultural run-off, coastal aquaculture, industrial effluents, and domestic sewage are responsible for the pollution of groundwater in Thailand. Also, the lack of an appropriate pricing policy is leading to over-exploitation of groundwater beyond sustainable yield. There is limited information at the national level on groundwater extraction rates, or the extent of contamination.

An on-going case of surface- and groundwater pollution has prompted one critic to charge that, "...Thai environmental protection mechanisms including environmental laws and law enforcement are not functioning." He is referring to a case in Ratchaburi Province: there, since at least 2001, villagers of tambon Nam Pu have complained about toxic wastewater from an industrial waste treatment plant they suspected of contaminating their water. Wax Garbage Recycle Centre, an industrial waste treatment plant, began its operation in the upstream area of Nam Pu Creek about the same time as contamination became evident. The pollution spread to tambon Rang Bua of Chom Bueng District. Responding to complaints, the Thai Pollution Control Department tested creek water and groundwater. It found that levels of heavy metals (lead, nickel, and barium) exceeded their standards. They also found high levels of volatile organic compounds (VOC) such as toluene, xylene, ethylbenzene, benzene and cis-1,2-dichloroethylene. The Department of Industrial Works and Ratchaburi's Industry Office, since 2002, have sent 19 letters ordering the plant to improve its operation, and at least six orders for the plant to shut down parts of its facility. Despite efforts by the authorities, the plant is still in operation and toxic wastewater contamination continues unabated. A failing of Thai environmental governance is the lack of balance in regulatory power among authorities. The Pollution Control Department, for instance, has no power to revoke the plant's operating licences. That power resides with the Department of Industrial Works, but state agencies place greater importance on industrial economics than the environment.

=== Health effects ===
Water pollution results in typhoid, dysentery, hepatitis, trachoma, hookworm, and diarrhea. In 1999, hospitalization rates were:

- Typhoid: 4,000 hospitalizations
- Dysentery: 7,000 hospitalizations
- Diarrhea: 95,000 hospitalizations

Exposure to toxins and heavy metals in water causes skin disease, liver cancer, and birth defects. Klity Creek in Kanchanaburi Province was found to carry dangerous levels of lead from a lead separation plant upstream. Lead levels are apparently the cause of many cases of Down syndrome in village children, unidentified illnesses in adults, and many cattle deaths. In 1998, the plant was closed and the creek dredged, although as of 2017 lead levels were still considered unsafe and clean-up efforts continued to be needed.

=== Improvement efforts ===
In 1992, the government passed several pieces of legislation to prevent water pollution. The laws primarily limit industrial water contamination:

- Enhancement and Conservation of National Environment Quality Act (NEQA) of 1992
- Factories Act of 1992
- Navigation in Thai Waterways Act (Volume 14 ) as amended in 1992
- Public Health Act of 1992
- Cleanliness and Tidiness of the Country Act of 1992

The government continues to invest in wastewater treatment plants. In 2000, enough treated water was available to support 29% of the population, with more treatment plants under construction. Upon completion, treated water will support 65% of the population. The most common water treatments are inexpensive to build and maintain. They include oxidation ditches, aerated lagoons, and stabilization ponds. The government is also investigating more effective and modern techniques such as constructed wetlands.

== Wildlife ==
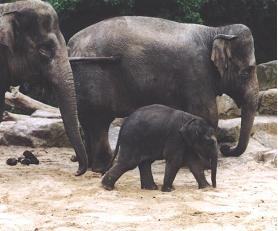
Asian elephants

Thailand's wildlife is threatened by poaching, habitat loss, and an industry that sells wild animals as pets.

The elephant is Thailand's national symbol. Although there were 100,000 elephants in Thailand a century ago, the population of elephants in the wild has dropped to an estimated 2,000. Poachers have long hunted elephants for ivory, meat, and hides. Young elephants are often captured for use in tourist attractions or as work animals, although their use has declined since the government banned logging in 1989. There are now more elephants in captivity than in the wild, and environmental activists claim that elephants in captivity are often mistreated.

Poaching of protected species remains a major problem. Hunters have decimated the populations of tigers, leopards, and other large cats for their valuable pelts. Many animals (including tigers, bears, crocodiles, and king cobras) are farmed or hunted for their meat, which is considered a delicacy, and for their supposed medicinal properties. Although such trade is illegal, the famous Bangkok market Chatuchak is still known for the sale of endangered species.

The practice of keeping wild animals as pets threatens several species. Baby animals are typically captured and sold, which often requires killing the mother. Once in captivity and out of their natural habitat, many pets die or fail to reproduce. Affected populations include the Asiatic black bear, Malayan sun bear, white-handed lar, pileated gibbon and binturong.

Large-scale deforestation and development have encroached on many former wildlife habitats, and pesticides in their food supply has reduced bird populations. Many species are listed as critically endangered because of habitat loss and over-exploitation. The World Bank estimates that, of 214 countries studied, Thailand ranks ninth (1=worst, 214=best) in the world in the number of mammal species (55 species) under threat.

Despite Buddhism's professed reverence for life, even Thai clergy have been guilty of overt animal abuse. One such case, that of Kwan, a Malayan sun bear, egregiously mistreated at Wat Aungsuwan (aka Wat Nong Hoy) in Prachuap Khiri Khan Province has been thoroughly documented by the Wildlife Friends Foundation Thailand (WFFT). First alerted to abuse at the temple in January 2012, it was not until three years later that Thai wildlife officials acted on behalf of the mistreated animals.

In 2016, the body of the last known dugong in the Gulf of Thailand, identified by marine biologists as DU-391, was found off the coast of Rayong. Number 391 refers to it being the 391st dead dugong to be found there. The decline of vulnerable species in the gulf continued unabated, as 355 protected animals died since January 2016, a 10% increase over 2015. The 355 dead marine animals included 11 dugongs, 180 sea turtles, and 164 dolphins and whales.

=== Conservation in theory ===
Conservation bills passed by the government include:

- 1960 Wild Animal Reservation and Protection Act
- 1961 National Park Act
- 1964 National Forest Reserve Act
- 1989 Logging ban in natural forests
- 1992 Forest Plantation Act
- 1992 Enhancement and Conservation of National Environmental Quality Act
- 1992 Wild Animals Reservation and Protection Act (WARPA), which forbids or restricts the hunting, breeding, possession, and trade of fifteen reserved animal species and two classes of protected species.

Until the acts of 1989–1992, conservation policies were difficult to enforce, and often took a back seat to economic development. These acts represented a major shift in Thai policy, and are part of the government's cooperation with the Convention on International Trade in Endangered Species of Wild Fauna and Flora (CITES), an international wildlife protection agreement.

The government now requires that at least 15% of its land area be protected as forest, and 22% is currently protected as wildlife sanctuaries or national parks. To enforce CITES, the government also maintains border checkpoints to prevent animal smuggling, and works to educate the public about wildlife preservation. Thailand's Buddhist culture, with its emphasis on respect for all life, has become a key component of the country's conservation efforts.

=== Conservation in practice ===
Current (2015) national law allows for ivory from domesticated Thai elephants to be sold legally. As an unintended consequence, large quantities of African ivory can be laundered through Thai shops. Only by closing the domestic trade in ivory can Thailand help eliminate the threat to African elephants. Thailand's ivory market is the largest in the world and trade is largely fuelled by ivory from poached African elephant's tusks that are smuggled into the country.

In July 2014, at a CITES intercessional meeting, Thailand agreed to a strict timetable to address the illegal ivory trade or face the threat of trade sanctions. One week before the meeting, the TRAFFIC had released a survey of Bangkok that found significantly more retail shops and three times as much ivory on sale as in 2013. Thailand was given until 30 September 2014 to submit a revised national ivory action plan, to include a number of CITES specified measures. Thailand was to be next assessed by CITES on 31 March 2015. If found lacking, CITES will vote on whether trade sanctions should be imposed against the country. The impact of punitive sanctions on the national economy would be significant: all trade in CITES-listed species would be prohibited. The export of orchids by the country's horticultural sector, for example, would be stopped, resulting in a loss of more than US$80 million in annual sales based on the 2013 value of this trade.

A study published in 2018 by USAID Wildlife Asia said about 500,000 Thais are believed to own ivory products, and 250,000 own artifacts made from tiger parts. At Kanchanaburi's infamous Tiger Temple, nine tiger fangs, more than 1,000 amulets containing tiger skin and dozens of jars filled with dead animals and animal parts were found in a pick-up truck driven out of the Tiger Temple by a monk and two disciples. The temple has profited handsomely from tourism while billing itself as a spiritual organization dedicated to wildlife conservation since it opened in 1994.

== Domestic animal welfare ==
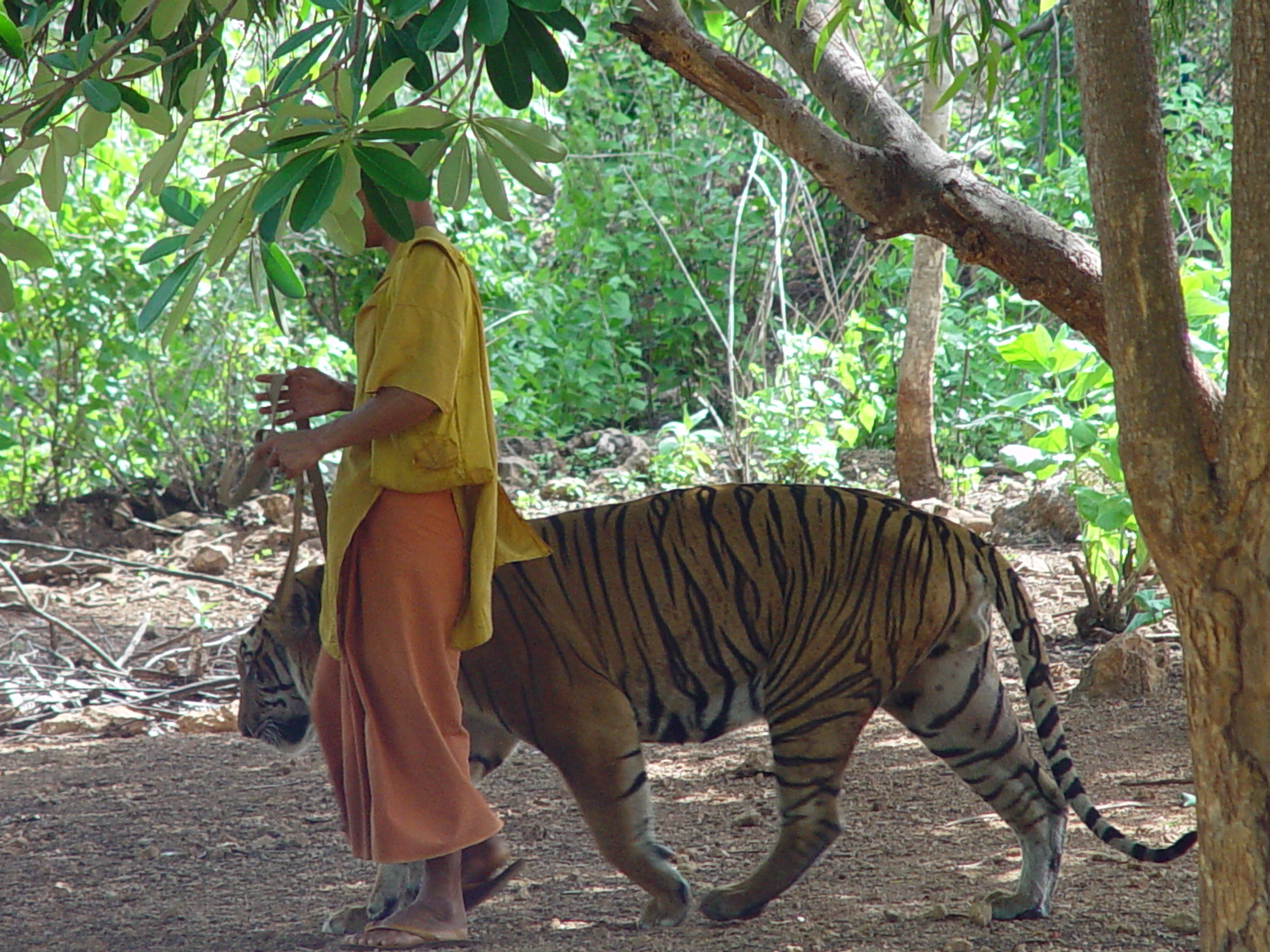
A monk walks a captive tiger at the Tiger Temple. Authorities seized protected birds from the temple in 2015. National Geographic alleged in 2016 that the Buddhist monks there are operating a for-profit breeding, selling, and exploitation business with the enslaved tigers.

Thailand introduced its first animal welfare laws in 2014. The Prevention of Animal Cruelty and Provision of Animal Welfare Act came into being on 27 December 2014.

The law protects animals "raised as pets, as animals for work, as beasts of burden, as friends, as livestock, as performing show animals, or for any other purpose, no matter with or without owners". Owners of animals are now required by law to "raise, nurture and keep the animals in appropriate conditions with good health and sanitation and with sufficient food and water". Within the act, the term "owner" is deemed to cover all family members and domestic help, as well as any friends assigned to take care of a pet.

Menus featuring live vertebrates are now illegal in Thailand. Trading in and consuming dog and cat meat is now illegal in Thailand under the 2014 act. Feeding live prey to snakes, crocodiles or other animals is also prohibited.

The act prohibits neglect, torture, or uncaring transport of live animals. Neglect includes improper housing and transportation of animals. An infraction is punishable by law, which may impose a two-year prison term and a fine of up to 40,000 baht (US$1,663), or both. Persons who dump unwanted pets at temples can now be charged with abandoning and endangering the animal.

== Governmental indifference ==
The National Council for Peace and Order (NCPO), the military junta that took power in Thailand in May 2014, has taken a cavalier attitude towards environmental concerns. In early-March 2016, the NCPO issued Order No. 9/2016, designed to cut short the process of conducting environmental impact assessments (EIA) on mega-projects. This makes it possible for state agencies to fast track public projects related to transportation, water management, public health, and prevention of public dangers. The order allows state projects to be proposed to the cabinet before a full EIA is completed.

Junta order No.4/2016, signed on 20 March 2016 by Prime Minister Gen Prayut Chan-o-cha in his capacity as the chair of the Committee on National Energy Policy was published in the Royal Thai Gazette on 31 March 2016. It exempts 29 plants, 27 of them run by the state, from all laws related to city planning. The planned construction of coal-fired plants in Thepha District in Songkhla Province and in Nuea Khlong District of Krabi Province have both met with strong opposition from locals who are concerned about their environmental impact.

On 22 October 2019, the 26-member National Hazardous Substances Committee (NHSC) changed the hazardous agricultural chemicals paraquat, glyphosate, and chlorpyrifos from Type 3 toxic substances to Type 4, effectively prohibiting their production, import, export, or possession. Their use will be prohibited as of 1 December 2019. On 27 November 2019, the NHSC amended that timetable, moving the date for the ban of paraquat and chlorpyrifos to 1 June 2020. They lifted the ban on glyphosate, albeit with restrictions on usage: glyphosate will be used only on six major crops: corn, cassava, sugarcane, rubber, oil palms, and fruit. It is not permitted in watershed areas and other sensitive environment zones, and farmers must submit proof of use including the type of crops and the size of their farms when purchasing glyphosate. Industry Minister Suriya Jungrungreangkit, who chairs the NHSC, said the committee reached its decision after reviewing information provided by the Department of Agriculture and the Ministry of Public Health. NCHS member Jirapon Limpananon, chair of the Pharmacy Council of Thailand, announced her resignation from the NCHS Wednesday night following the meeting. The government's u-turn on the ban of dangerous chemicals prompted a columnist at the Bangkok Post to fume that, "...no further proof is required to show how some unscrupulous Thai mandarins are being held hostage by the agro monsters. With a wishy-washy prime minister, who clearly has no political will to make the right decision on this matter, we are indeed in a helpless situation."

== Intimidation of environmental activists ==
In November 2016, the UN's regional human rights office (OHCHR) condemned Thailand for a series of murders of land activists which have gone unpunished, drawing attention to the kingdom's poor record in solving such killings. The office said it was compelled to speak out after an appeals court in Thailand's south upheld the acquittal of the sole suspect in the murder of an activist in 2015. Thailand has long been a dangerous place in which to take on powerful interest groups. A 2014 report by Global Witness said Thailand was the eighth most dangerous country in the world to be a land rights activist, the second most dangerous in Asia after the Philippines. Rights groups say between 50 and 60 rights defenders have been murdered in the last 20 years. There are also at least 81 open cases of enforced disappearance dating back as far the mid-1990s, according to the Asian Federation Against Involuntary Disappearances.

- On 21 June 2004, Charoen Wat-aksorn was assassinated as he alighted from a bus returning to Prachuap Khiri Khan after he gave testimony about environmental destruction in Bo Nok and Ban Krut to the Senate in Bangkok. Charoen was a human rights defender and leader of the Love Bo Nok group who fought for over ten years until his death against coal-fired power, large-scale shrimp farming, and other environmental destruction in Prachuap Khiri Khan.
- Porlajee Rakchongcharoen, known as "Billy", a Karen environmental activist, was reportedly arrested on 17 April 2014, in Kaeng Krachan National Park in Phetchaburi Province by a park superintendent and four other park officers. He was detained because he was found with a protected wild bee honeycomb and six bottles of honey. He has not been seen since. It is feared that he was murdered because of his activism. Billy's disappearance came three years after he assisted Karen villagers of Pong Luk Bang Kloy to file a lawsuit against the superintendent for ordering the eviction and burning of the village in May 2011. On 30 January 2017, Thailand's Department of Special Investigation (DSI) said that it would not investigate his disappearance, leaving it in the hands of the regular police despite three years of no progress in the case. However, after continued pressure from the Karen community, and especially Billy's wife Pinnapa Prueksapan, the DSI took on the case in April 2019. Possibly their late willingness to investigate was influenced by UNESCO turning down Thailand's application for Kaeng Krachan to be declared a world heritage site due to ongoing conflicts with the indigenous Karen communities. In September 2019 the DSI announced they had found an oil drum containing burned human remains, in a dam near to the area where Billy was last seen. DNA evidence matched Billy's mother and the case was re-classified as a murder investigation.
- The NGO Global Witness reports that in 2014, four Thai environmental activists were murdered due to their work on local environmental issues. From 2002-2014, Global Witness estimates the total to be 21 deaths.
- South Thailand's "Southern Peasants Federation" (SPF) names four of its members who were murdered between 2010–2015.
- The New York Times reports that "Thailand is among the world's most dangerous countries in which to oppose powerful interests that profit from coal plants, toxic waste dumping, land grabs or illegal logging. Some 60 people who spoke out on these issues have been killed over the past 20 years,..."
- On 5 August 2019, a prominent human rights activist, Eakachai Itsaratha, was abducted by ten men as he was entering a mosque to attend a public hearing on a rock quarry project planned for Phatthalung Province. He was taken to a hotel and held against his will until the completion of the hearing. Upon being released he was threatened. He was told not to return to the quarry site in Tamot District again, saying that his activities had adversely affected the quarry project and the process of obtaining permission from the government. Eakachai is secretary-general of Thailand's Non-Governmental Organizations Coordinating Committee on Development for the southern region (NGO COD-South), as well as the former deputy leader of the grassroots-based Commoner Party.

== See also ==
- Agriculture in Thailand
- Deforestation in Thailand
- Office of the National Water Resources
- Waste management in Thailand
