= Waste management in Thailand =

There are various issues of waste management in Thailand, including excessive plastic use, industrial waste, among others.

== Solid waste ==
=== Municipal solid waste ===
Thais per capita generate an estimated 1.14 kg of solid waste per day—50 percent of it biodegradable. According to Interior Ministry statistics, refuse nationwide in 2016 amounted to 27 million tonnes, up about 0.7 percent from the previous year. Of this, 4.2 million tonnes was generated in Bangkok. The yearly figure in 2009 was 15.1 million tonnes. About twenty percent of total is generated in the Bangkok Metropolitan Area (BMA) Of the waste generated in 2015, only about five million tonnes were recycled. Only about eight million tonnes were handled in accordance with global best practices. Of Thailand's 2,500 dump sites, only about 20 percent are managed properly. According to the Pollution Control Department (PCD), Thailand's primary waste watchdog, the nation faces serious solid waste management issues. Those issues are increasing. Wichan Simachaya, director-general of the PCD, said the volume of waste could continue to grow by 600,000 tonnes a year, due to increasing population and tourism.

Thailand's waste management plan calls for 75 percent of Thailand's total solid waste to be properly disposed of or recycled in some way by 2021, up from the current 49 percent. By 2021, the government and private sector plan to spend a total of 177 billion baht (US$5.1 billion) on waste management technology and public awareness campaigns. "We have fines for littering but no one seems to care," Wijarn said. "We need to step up law enforcement as well as teach people to recycle, reuse and reduce waste."

In Thailand the roles in solid waste management (MSW) and industrial waste management are organized by the Royal Thai Government, which is then divided among the central government, regional governments, and local governments. Each government is responsible for different tasks. The central government is responsible to stimulate regulation, policies, and standards. The regional governments are responsible for coordinating central and local governments. Local governments are responsible for waste management in their governed area. Local governments themselves do not dispose of waste, but instead hire private companies that have been granted that right by the PCD. A major problem is lack of funding for waste management—the average Thai household pays less than one dollar a month to dispose of its solid waste. The main companies are Bangpoo Industrial Waste Management Center; General Environmental Conservation Public Company Limited (GENCO); SGS Thailand; Waste Management Siam Ltd (WMS); Better World Green Public Company Limited (BWG). and Professional Waste Technology (1999) Public Company Ltd A leading resource recovery company is Wongpanit, who purchase mixed recyclables (paper, plastics, glass, aluminum, steel) at about 11,300 baht per tonne. These companies are responsible for the waste they have picked up from their customers before disposal.

==== Organic waste ====
The PCD estimates that in 2017 organic waste collected by municipalities across Thailand accounted for nearly two-thirds of the country's total waste output: a reported 7.6 million tonnes— 64%—of the refuse collected was organic waste. It is thought that a significant portion of this waste is not merely fruit and vegetable peelings, but edible surplus food. This in a nation where 400,000 to 600,000 children may be undernourished due to poverty, yet ten percent of all children are obese. Prevailing attitudes do not encompass composting or waste sorting: 64 percent of the Thai population do not sort their rubbish according to one study.

==== Plastic waste ====
Thailand is a profligate user of one-time use plastics. Thais use 70 billion plastic bags a year. The country is a major contributor, along with China, Indonesia, the Philippines, Vietnam and Sri Lanka, of up to 60% of plastic pollution in oceans. Thailand's 23 coastal provinces dump an estimated one million tonnes of garbage into the sea each year. Plastic bags make up 15%, plastic straws account for seven percent, and cigarette butts five percent. According to the Ministry of Natural Resources and Environment, 150 sea turtles, 100 whales and dolphins, and 12 dugongs die each year from discarded trash, half of which die from eating plastic bags.

In June 2017, Thailand pledged at an international forum to reduce plastic use. Thailand admitted waste mismanagement was the major cause of Thailand's poor record. Delegates representing Thailand's military government at the conference committed to put an end to the problem. Accordingly, it has included waste management in its 20-year national strategy.

In an easy step forward, Thailand's Pollution Control Department (PCD) got agreements from five major water bottlers to cease using plastic cap seals on drinking water bottles by 1 April 2018. A cap seal is the small plastic wrap molded over the bottle cap that must be peeled off before the bottle can be opened. Studies have found that bottles without them pose no hygienic health risk. The PCD aims to have them removed from all bottled water containers by the end of 2018. According to the PCD, Thailand produces 4.4 billion plastic drinking water bottles per year. Sixty percent, or 2.6 billion, of these bottles have cap seals. The weight of the plastic cap seals alone is around 520 tonnes per year.

On 21 July 2018 the Thai government kicked off a campaign to reduce the use of foam containers and single-use plastic bags at fresh markets countrywide. Early indications are that those efforts have not been embraced by the Thai public.

Finally, a ban on single-use plastic bags with a thickness of less than 36 microns at major retailers was enacted to take effect on 1 January 2020. The ban exempts, until 2021, the 40% of total volume of single-use bags used at wet markets and restaurants. Bag manufacturers have cried foul, arguing that the solution to plastic pollution is proper disposal of bags and recycling. To make matters worse for the manufacturers, eight TV channels signed an agreement with the Ministry of Natural Resources and Environment on 2 January 2020 to blur images and footage of single-use plastic bags on-screen, as is done in Thailand for firearms, cigarettes, and alcohol. Thailand imported 480,000 tonnes of plastic garbage from abroad in 2018, and is set to import an additional 220,000 tonnes before existing contracts expire in September 2020. Between 2014 and 2018 Thailand imported 906,521 tonnes of plastic from 81 countries, according to the Commerce Ministry. Plastic imports nearly doubled between 2018 and 2019 due to increased Chinese imports.

=== Industrial and toxic waste ===
As of 2016 Thailand collected and processed the industrial waste of 68,261 companies. Its capacity to process industrial and toxic waste is 37.6 million tonnes annually, an estimated 2.8 million tonnes of which is toxic waste. Total capacity in 2015 was 25.8 million tonnes. The Ministry of Industry's Department of Industrial Works (DIW) plans to establish 15 regional waste management facilities throughout the country as detailed in its five-year waste management plan for 2015-2019.

==== Medical waste ====
The Bangkok Metropolitan Administration's 500-bed General Hospital produces about 196,000 pieces of "medical waste" per month. About half of this waste consists of "clean products": packaging, PVC bags for dialysis solution, and other non-infectious items that could potentially be recycled or upcycled. Thailand has thirty-three 500-or more-bed hospitals, as well as 321 other hospitals and health centres with between 11 and 250 bed nationwide, meaning the quantity of medical waste is significant.

==== Electronic waste ====
Thailand banned the import of foreign electronic waste (e-waste) in June 2019, the same year as China. In spite of the ban, new recycling factories have opened across Thailand, particularly in the eastern provinces, and tonnes of potentially hazardous e-waste are being processed. Since the e-waste ban, 28 new recycling factories, most processing e-waste, started up in Chachoengsao Province alone. In 2019, 14 businesses in that province were granted licenses to process e-waste. In October 2019, the Thai legislature relaxed labour and environmental regulations for all factories, a boon to the e-waste industry. One provision of the legislation even exempts small companies from pollution monitoring. Concomitantly, a bill to strengthen e-waste restrictions has gone nowhere in parliament. An official of the Basel Action Network, which campaigns against dumping waste in poor countries, said, "E-waste has to go somewhere, and the Chinese are simply moving their entire operations to Southeast Asia. The only way to make money is to get huge volume with cheap, illegal labour and pollute the hell out of the environment," he added.

== Waste water ==
In a 2004 study commissioned by the World Bank to examine the state of Thailand's infrastructure, the authors concluded that, "The worst infrastructure provision performance in Thailand is in waste water treatment....Virtually none of the...[waste water treatment] systems are operating....only 3 waste water plants operate sporadically. The problem is that no user fees are assessed or collected and that households and firm [sic] are not required to connect to the systems. Water supply authorities,...have consistently refused to add waste water charges to their water supply bills, despite clear evidence from international experience that this is best practice."

At the end of 2016, the Bangkok Metropolitan Administration (BMA) is considering the imposition of a waste water fee, pending endorsement by the BMA council. If approved, the move will impose fees on waste water release:

- Households producing waste water of 10–100 m^{3} per month will be charged 30 baht
- State agencies, schools, companies, hospitals producting less than 500 m^{3} will be charged 500 baht
- Discharging between 500-1,000 m^{3} will incur a 1,000 baht charge
- Discharge exceeding 1,000 m^{3} will be charged 1,500 baht
- Factories, hotels, and other large-scale users will pay four baht per cubic metre

The fees collected will be used to improve waste water facilities operated by the BMA.

In 2015 Thailand produced 9.5 million m^{3} of waste water. This was the equivalent of 150 litres per day per person. Only 34 percent of the waste water was treated at one of Thailand's 93 treatment facilities before being returned to the environment. One direct result was a corresponding deterioration of the quality of Thai coastal waters.

== Environmental impacts ==
According to the United Nations Ocean Conference Thailand produces about 50.000 tonnes of solid waste that finds its way into the sea each year. Large quantities of coastal rubbish, especially in the upper reaches of the Gulf of Thailand impact sea life and coastal mangroves. Mangrove swamps are cluttered with garbage. At one site, the Bangkok Post reported that, "Plastic bags, bottles, ropes, discarded noodle containers and even a rusty cooking appliance float in the water or are stuck in the mud under the green canopy."

The Thai Pollution Control Department (PCD) reports that the water quality of major rivers flowing into the upper Gulf of Thailand has seriously deteriorated in the past decade. The department found the lower Chao Phraya River, which flows through Bangkok, contains bacteria and nutrient pollution from phosphates, phosphorus, and nitrogen. Nutrient pollution causes algae to grow faster than ecosystems can handle, harming water quality, food resources for aquatic animals, and marine habitats. It also decreases the oxygen that fish need to survive. PCD categorised water quality at the mouth of Chao Phraya at Bangkok's Bang Khun Thian District as "very poor" and worse than in 2014. Nearby rivers, such as the Tha Chin in Samut Sakhon, were rated "poor". PCD findings indicated large amounts of wastewater were discharged into the river from households, industry, and agriculture.

== See also ==
- Chemical waste
- Hazardous waste
- List of solid waste treatment technologies
- List of waste management companies
- List of waste management topics
- Recycling
- Soil Pollution
- Toxic waste
- Water pollution in Thailand
