= Wildlife Friends Foundation Thailand =

Organization

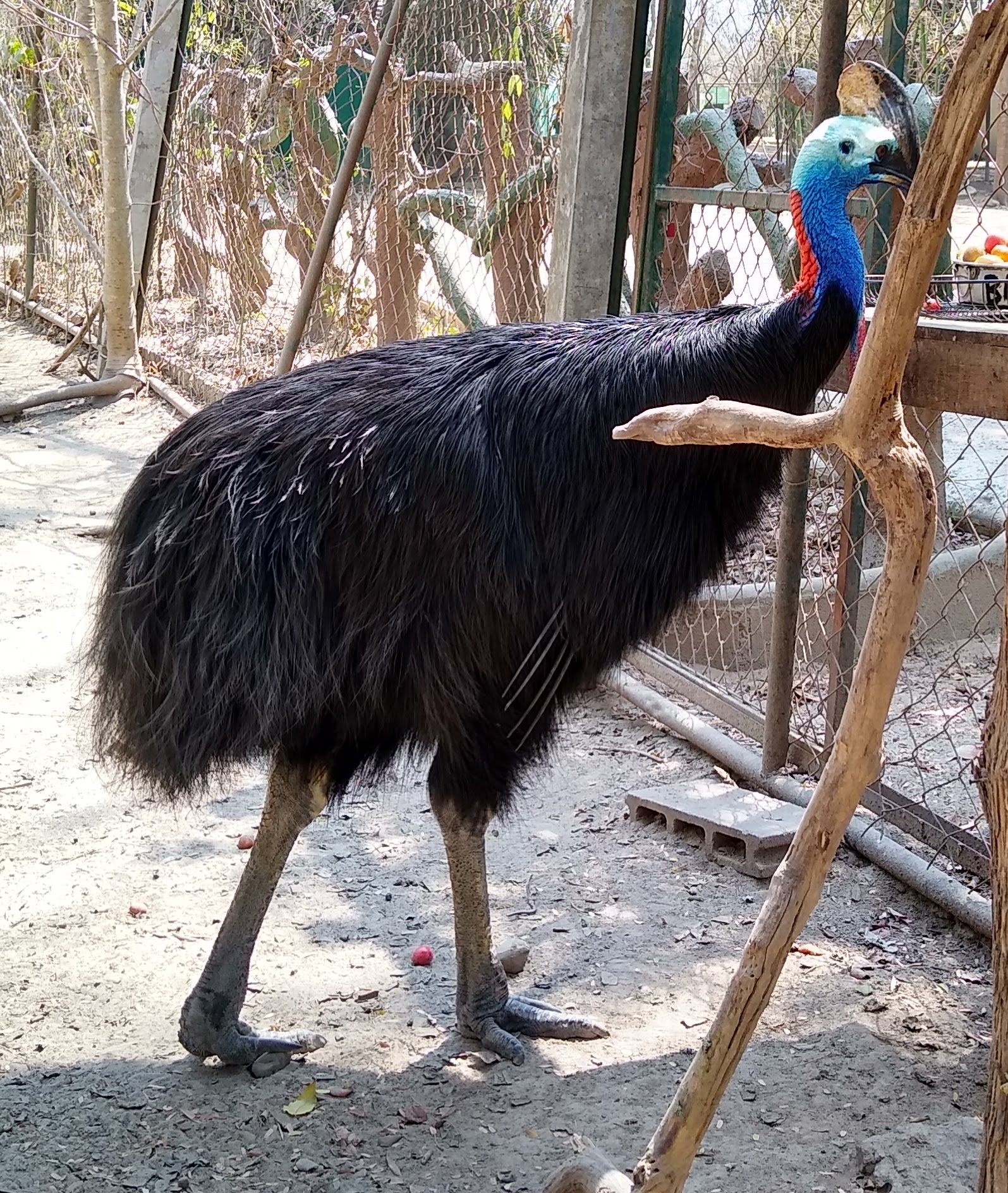
A cassowary at the Wildlife Rescue Centre

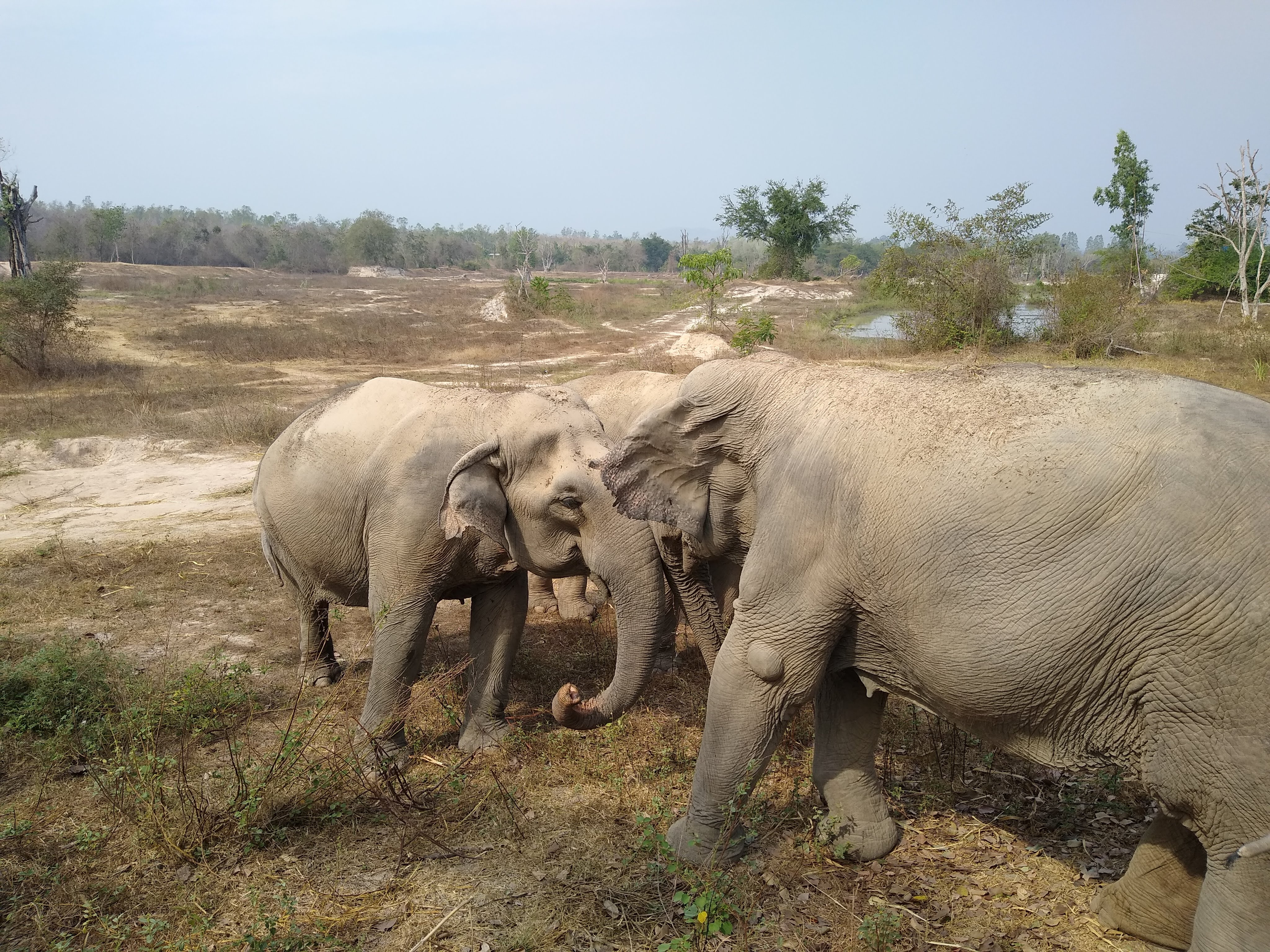
Elephants at the Wildlife Rescue Centre

Wildlife Friends Foundation Thailand (WFFT) is a registered foundation (non-profit) NGO (non-governmental organization) in Thailand, founded in 2001 by Edwin Wiek. The foundation has several different projects including animal rescue, rehabilitation and veterinary assistance to wild animals in Thailand. It also is active in promoting the protection of wildlife, their natural habitat and the natural environment. This is done through educational initiatives for local Thai people as well as tourists. WFFT operate a rescue center and wildlife refuge, including an Elephant refuge. WFFT responds to reports by the public and government officials of wildlife in need of care. Many of these rescued wild animals are kept as pets illegally, or are found injured. WFFT is known for their public stand against the so-called Tiger Temple and its ongoing violations of laws regarding keeping protected wildlife.

Edwin Wiek published an open letter in The Nation (Thailand) in 2012, indicating that park officials may be complicit in murdering adult elephants in order to capture baby elephants to be used in Tourism shows and elephant rides. Shortly thereafter, several park officials went into hiding. The head of the Parks department then conducted a raid on WFFT with around 150 armed park agents, seizing 99 of 400 animals in the WFFT wildlife refuge. The court case found several people guilty, including Wiek, and penalized them with fines and suspended jail sentences. Two years later an appeals court reversed all charges.

== Volunteering at WFFT ==
WFFT accepts and invites volunteers from all over the world and in Thailand to come in and support the various animal rescue projects. Volunteer accommodation has basic amenities and is onsite in and around the animals. Volunteers stay a minimum of 1 week and some stay long term 6 months plus.
