= Thailand Greenhouse Gas Management Organization =

Thailand's GHG reduction watchdog

Thailand Greenhouse Gas Management Organization (Public Organization)
- องค์การบริหารจัดการก๊าซเรือนกระจก (องค์การมหาชน)

Public organization overview
- Formed: 2007
- Headquarters: Lak Si District, Bangkok
- Annual budget: 158.1 million baht (FY2019)
- Minister responsible: Varawut Silpa-archa
- Public organization executives: Kiatchai Maitriwong, Executive Director; Rongphet Bunchuaidee, Deputy Executive Director; Natarika Wayuparb Nitiphon, Deputy Executive Director
- Parent Public organization: Ministry of Natural Resources and Environment
- Website: Official website

The Thailand Greenhouse Gas Management Organization (TGO) (Thai: องค์การบริหารจัดการก๊าซเรือนกระจก (องค์การมหาชน), RTGS: Ongkan Borihan Chatkan Kat Ruean Krachok (Ongkan Maha Chon)); or อบก., RTGS: oboko) is an autonomous governmental organization under the Ministry of Natural Resources and Environment (MNRE) established by the royal decree, Establishment of Thailand Greenhouse Gas Management Organization (Public Organization) BE 2550 (2007). It is responsible for reducing greenhouse gas (GHG) emissions in Thailand. The royal decree was effective as of 7 July 2007.

== Management and budget ==
As of 2020 the executive director of the Thailand Greenhouse Gas Management Organization is Mr.Kiatchai Maitriwong. TGO's budget for FY2019 is 158.1 million baht.

== National goal ==
Thailand signed the Paris Agreement on climate change on 22 April 2016. It submitted an "Intended Nationally Determined Contribution" (INDC) target for greenhouse gas (GHG) reductions between 7–20% of the "business as usual" (BAU) scenario by 2020. By 2030 Thailand has pledged to reduce GHG emissions by 20–25% from the BAU baseline.

== Objectives ==
Section 7 of the decree establishing TGO prescribed TGO's objectives:

1. to analyse, scrutinise, and collect views and opinions in relation to the approval of projects, as well as to pursue and appraise authorised projects
2. to promote the market for greenhouse gas emissions trading
3. to be an information centre for greenhouse gas operations
4. to create a database of authorised projects and the approved trading of greenhouse gas emissions, in accordance with policy determined by the national board
5. to enhance the efficiency as well as instruct public agencies and private bodies in greenhouse gas operations
6. to manage greenhouse gas management public relations
7. to support climate change operations

== Progress ==
According to the Bangkok Post, in 2006, the year before TGO was established, Thailand emitted 232 million tonnes (Mt) of carbon dioxide (CO_{2}), 44 million tonnes of that number from burning coal. By 2016, Thailand's CO_{2} emissions had risen to 342 million tonnes, 65 million tonnes of it from coal burning. The International Energy Agency's (IEA) numbers differ: it reports total emissions figures of 202 Mt in 2006 and 245 Mt in 2016. As of 2018, Thailand's greenhouse gas emissions continue to increase. A slight reduction in the annual GHG growth rate of 3.3% in 2014 is attributed to greenhouse gas reduction measures and sequestration by forests.
