= Ministry of Natural Resources and Environment (Thailand) =

Government ministry of Thailand

- กระทรวงทรัพยากรธรรมชาติและสิ่งแวดล้อม
- Seal of the ministry

- Flag of the ministry

Ministry overview
- Formed: 3 October 2002; 23 years ago
- Jurisdiction: Government of Thailand
- Headquarters: Phaya Thai District, Bangkok
- Annual budget: 30,693 million baht (FY2019)
- Minister responsible: Suchart Chomklin, Minister
- Ministry executive: Jatuporn Buruspat, Permanent Secretary
- Website: www.mnre.go.th/en/index

The Ministry of Natural Resources and Environment (Abrv: MNRE; Thai: กระทรวงทรัพยากรธรรมชาติและสิ่งแวดล้อม, RTGS: Krasuang Sapphayakon Thammachat Lae Sing Waetlom) is a cabinet ministry in the Government of Thailand.

== History ==
The ministry was founded in 2002. Its responsibilities include the protection of the nation's natural resources: water, oceans, minerals, and forests. It is also responsible for the protection and restoration of the environment. It vision is "to return the natural environment to the Thai people and to work towards the incorporation of natural resources and the environment in the Government's national agenda as these provide the basis for social and economic development."

== Departments ==
=== Administration ===
- Office of the Minister
- Office of the Permanent Secretary

=== Dependent departments ===
- Department of Mineral Resources
- Department of Marine and Coastal Resources
  - Phuket Marine Biological Center
- Department of Water Resources
- Department of Groundwater Resources
- Royal Forest Department
- Department of National Parks, Wildlife and Plant Conservation
- Office of the Natural Resources and Environment Policy and Planning (ONEP)
- Department of Climate Change and Environment
- Pollution Control Department

=== State enterprises ===
- The Botanical Garden Organization of Thailand
  - Queen Sirikit Botanic Garden, Mae Rim, Chiang Mai
- The Forest Industry Organization
  - National Elephant Institute
- Zoological Park Organization
  - Khao Kheow Open Zoo
  - Chiang Mai Zoo
  - Nakhon Ratchasima Zoo
  - Songkhla Zoo
  - Ubon Ratchathani Zoo
  - Khon Kaen Zoo
  - Elephant Kingdom Surin
  - Wetland and Eastern Sarus Crane Conservation Center

=== Public organizations ===
- Thailand Greenhouse Gas Management Organization (TGO)
- Biodiversity-Based Economy Development Office

== Environment initiatives ==
- In August 2015, the MNRE announced a program to "encourage people to refrain from using plastic bags." The initiative is aimed at promoting the use of cloth bags one day a month beginning on 15 August and on the 15th day of every month thereafter. The campaign will be expanded to two to three days a week instead of once a month if public response is positive. Thailand could lower the use of plastic bags by as many as one million bags a day if everyone used one fewer plastic bag a day. The program was partially superseded by Thailand's ban on single-use plastic bags at major retail outlets as of 1 January 2020.
- MNRE's master plan is the 20-Year Strategic Plan for the Ministry of Natural Resources and Environment (B.E. 2560 – 2579) covering the years 2017–2036. It outlines six strategies to address environmental issues, including addressing climate change (Strategy Five).

== Issues ==
=== Forests ===
The first strategy in MNRE's strategic plan is to "protect forest areas". Forested areas in Thailand include conservation forests of 80.88 million rai (129,410 km^{2}); national conservation forests of 53.80 million rai (86,080 km^{2}); and mangrove areas of 1.534 million rai (2,454 km^{2}). The first line of forest defense are the roughly 20,000 forest rangers from three departments of MNRE: the Department of National Parks, Wildlife and Plant Conservation; the Royal Forest Department; and the Department of Marine and Coastal Resources. Their work is hazardous: as of August 2018 ten forest rangers were killed in the line of duty over the previous 12-month period. Despite the danger and the importance of their work, they are temporary workers on one or four year contracts. The one-year rangers earn from 7,500 to 9,000 baht per month. The four-year contract rangers can earn "...more than 10,000 baht salary per month." Temporary workers are not eligible for government health coverage.

=== Plastic waste ===
Thailand will move to ban the import of all plastic waste products. Initially MNRE will ban the import of 411 types of e-waste. The import of all plastic wastes will be banned in the next two years. "We need to prioritise good environment and the health of our citizens over industrial development," said Natural Resources and Environment Minister Surasak Kanchanarat. Some exceptions will be allowed: the new laws will allow the import of used electronic telecommunication products and copying machines for repair and reuse. Steel, copper, and aluminum scraps will be allowed for industrial if the scraps are clean and not mixed with other substances. Imports of electronic and plastic waste resulting in massive piles of scrap were turning the country into the "world's garbage bin".

== See also ==
- Cabinet of Thailand
- Deforestation in Thailand
- Environmental issues in Thailand
- Government of Thailand
- List of Government Ministers of Thailand
- Office of the National Water Resources
