= Royal Forest Department =

- กรมป่าไม้

Agency overview
- Formed: 18 September 1896; 129 years ago
- Jurisdiction: Government of Thailand
- Headquarters: Chatuchak, Bangkok, Thailand
- Annual budget: 5,584 million baht (FY2019)
- Agency executive: Surachai Achalaboon (2024), Director-General
- Parent department: Ministry of Natural Resources and Environment
- Website: www.forest.go.th

The Royal Forest Department (Abrv: RFD; Thai: กรมป่าไม้, RTGS: Krom Pa Mai) is a department in the Ministry of Natural Resources and Environment (MoNRE), part of the Government of Thailand.

== History ==
On 18 September 1896 King Chulalongkorn established the Royal Forest Department under the Ministry of the Interior to manage forests and control revenue from the teak forests of northern Thailand. A British forester, Herbert Slade, former Deputy Conservator of Forests in Burma, served as the first director of the department. In its early days the department focused on obtaining tax revenue for the use of forests rather than conservation, although its conservators expressed concern about unsustainable harvesting of teak in Thailand's northern forests. In 1899 all forests were declared government property and all logging without payment to the Royal Forest Department was prohibited.

Formerly the agency controlled Thailand's national parks but in 2002 they were taken over by the National Park, Wildlife and Plant Conservation Department (DNP), also part of the Ministry of Natural Resources and Environment.

Today, the agency aims to monitor forests, coordinate research, encourage community forest management, conserve forest land and monitor the wood industry.

== Budget ==
In fiscal year 2018 (FY2018), the RFA's budget was 5,501 million baht, increasing to 5,584 million baht in FY2019.

== See also ==
- Deforestation in Thailand
