= Community Based Mangrove Management =

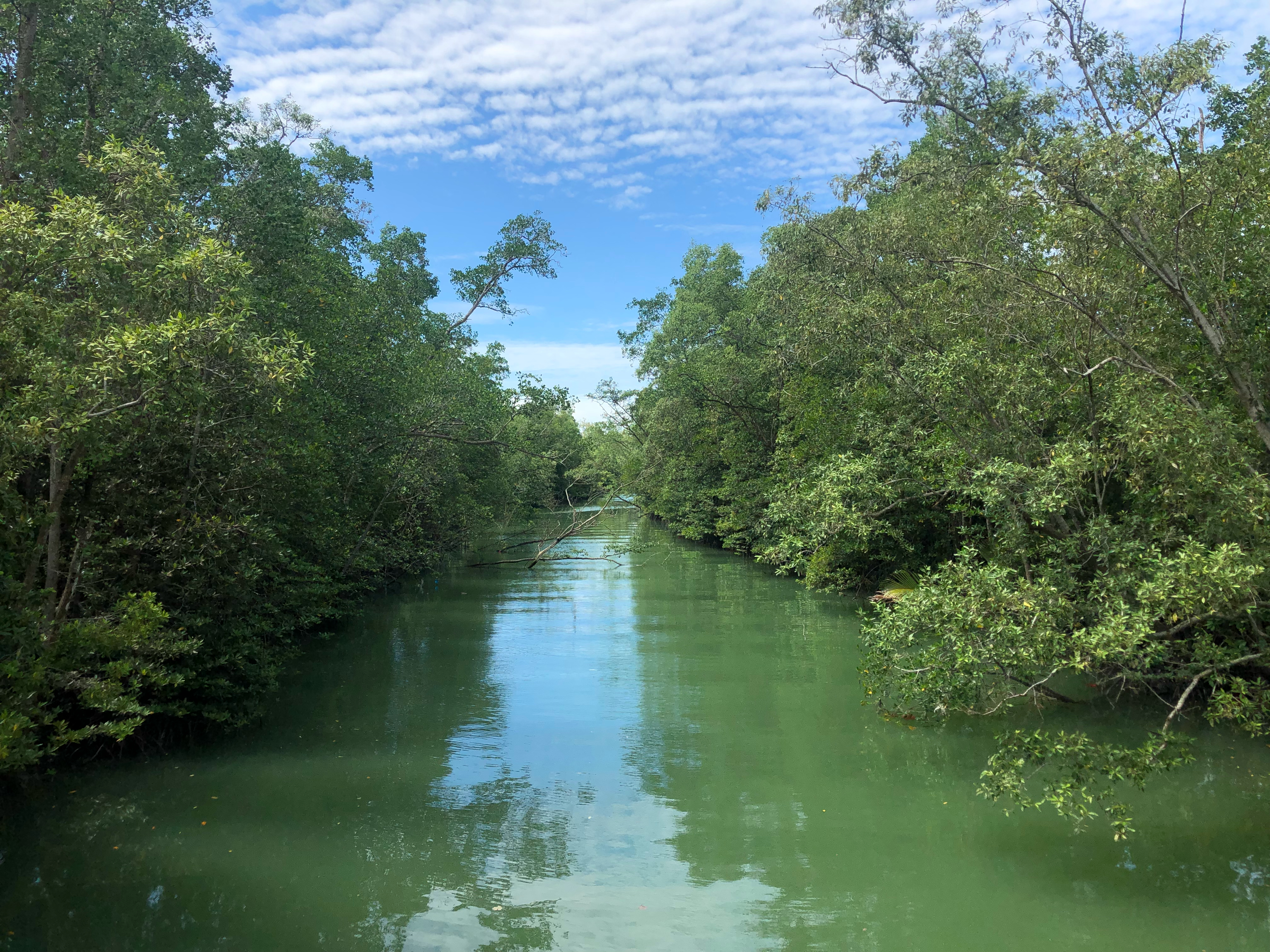
Mangrove forest along the Tampines River

Community Based Mangrove Management (CBMM) is a sustainable approach for conserving the rapidly disappearing mangrove forests. It can be defined as community driven management and rehabilitation of mangrove forests involving resource users in the management process directly. CBMM decentralizes authority and power from government to local communities. The dual aim of CBMM is the ongoing conservation of mangroves and generation of sustainable livelihood.

Mangroves are productive biological habitats which have been degraded rapidly. The major reasons for degradation of this valuable ecosystem include deforestation, pollution, unsustainable harvesting practices and other land use changes. Anthropogenic and climatic factors are threatening this valuable ecosystem which makes conservation and management of mangroves of prime importance. Scientists observed that community managed mangroves have remarkable recovery potential and local people are effective stewards for management of these resources. Community restoration of mangroves is now widely advocated as a solution for conservation of these valuable ecosystems.

== History ==
Traditionally local communities managed the mangroves but during the colonial and post-colonial periods these forests came under the control of state government which gave incentive to farming and other land use changes. Due to complete control of government over these forests, local communities were alienated and started perceiving these forests as extra source of income. Hence, indiscriminate farming and intense logging destroyed this valuable ecosystem. The indigenous knowledge of local communities has been recognized by government and other funding agencies three decades ago, bringing about a shift in conservation and management approaches of mangroves.

Due to past failures of national and state government in the effective management of mangrove ecosystem, the importance of local communities in preserving this ecosystem is being realized lately. The government is no longer recognized as primary steward - involvement of communities and their traditional knowledge is being appreciated and promoted. Policies and programs are framed considering the active role and participation of the local community. The distinct difference between government and community led initiatives in mangrove conservation can be seen in Pondicherry, India. The sites planted based on knowledge of locals (Rhizophora) are found to be more effective during Indian Tsunami compared to the government planted mangrove species (Avicennia).

== CBMM and sustainability ==
The primary function of CBMM initiatives is identification of sustainable management methodologies. A system dedicated completely to the conservation of biodiversity or a practice committed to greater economic benefits is not appropriate for long term sustainability of the CBMM approach. Hence, ecological, economic and social sustainability need to be considered for the holistic success of CBMM programs.

=== Ecological Sustainability ===
Although government and agencies have been conducting the reforestation projects for many years, the ecological perspective is still absent from these projects. The major motivation for management was increased timber and charcoal production, ignoring ecological benefits of mangrove forests. The essential steps for mangrove regeneration are - identification of degraded mangrove site, selection of appropriate rehabilitation sites, timely plantation of seedlings, regular monitoring of outcomes and conservation of mangrove stands. An optimized land use plan should be implemented giving balanced attention to mangrove protection, shrimp ponds, infrastructure, agriculture development, coastal fisheries, and biodiversity conservation.

=== Economic Sustainability ===
Any CBMM initiative depends upon the willingness to pay (WTP) of local communities. The success is assessed by the awareness of community on the benefits offered by the mangroves and the initial investment of capital and labor is determined by the communities themselves. Mangrove products are the main source of income for coastal communities who are generally financially backward and marginal ones. People use mangroves for fuel wood, construction material but these activities become unsustainable over time due to exploitation and over-utilization of mangroves and natural resources. One of the major obstacles in implementing the sustainable management mangroves is their undervaluation due to institutional failures. It is important for government agencies to recognize the importance of CBMM initiatives, as the value provided by the mangroves like coastal protection and erosion control minimizes investment on expensive civil engineering projects, thus making mangroves an economically viable solution. There is also a difference in perception from one community to another regarding the valuation of mangrove ecosystems. For example, in Mexico, local communities in one area give importance to mangrove ecological services like fisheries and storm protection while the other community give importance to traditional wood-based activities.

=== Social Sustainability ===
Community participation, quality of life, social space, social capital, and social norms are the social components of the mangrove management. In addition to this, mangrove habitats have given rise to a diversity of cultural and aesthetic effects for coastal communities. The reduction of socio-economic vulnerability is important for success of CBMM program. Improvement in social structures by providing basic amenities, livelihood opportunities, and improving education and health is important for success. Hence, social welfare is necessary for the success of CBMM programs.

== Case Studies ==
=== Colombia ===
The mangroves have been illegally cleared in the Iscuande River delta which is home to Afro-Colombian communities. The mangroves in this area were cleared for firewood and other uses, threatening mollusk populations. In 2012 a conservation agreement was signed between Conservation International and Afro-Colombian communities to maintain 12,000 hectares of mangroves. Under the agreement, the community agreed to carry out sustainable harvesting of the mollusks, and women will carry out daily monitoring and data collection activities. In return they will get daily wages and development of local community infrastructure.

=== Thailand ===
With a high success rate, Thailand adopted CBMM programs in 1980s. The successful CBMM programs maintained more than 2000 sq. km of mangrove cover and were awarded the ‘Green Globe Award’ in 1995-2005. State agencies modified legislation and allocated financial assistance to local communities. The major reason for the success of CBMM in Thailand is the voluntary participation of locals in the program which were further strengthened by support of suitable technologies.

=== India ===
CBMM initiatives date back to the 1990s in India. Indian states initiated the Joint Forest Management (JFM) program under which village institutions operates. The duties for conservation and protection of mangrove are shared jointly by the government-run forest department and the communities.

=== Tanzania ===
Tanzania started CBMM programming in 1990s with moderate success. The USAID program provided funding to carry out this program through Community Forest Management Groups (CFMGs) and Coastal Resource Management Committees (CRMCs). Under this program logging permits are provided by CFMGs with a control in logging activity (Chotthong and Aksornkoae, 2006).

=== Ghana ===
The study in Volta estuary of Ghana indicates the primary motivation for participants in conservation and management of mangroves are livelihood and economic benefits. Institutional arrangements are shown to be effective for mangrove restoration and management with high economic returns.
