= Deforestation in Thailand =

Overview of the history and state of Thailand's forests

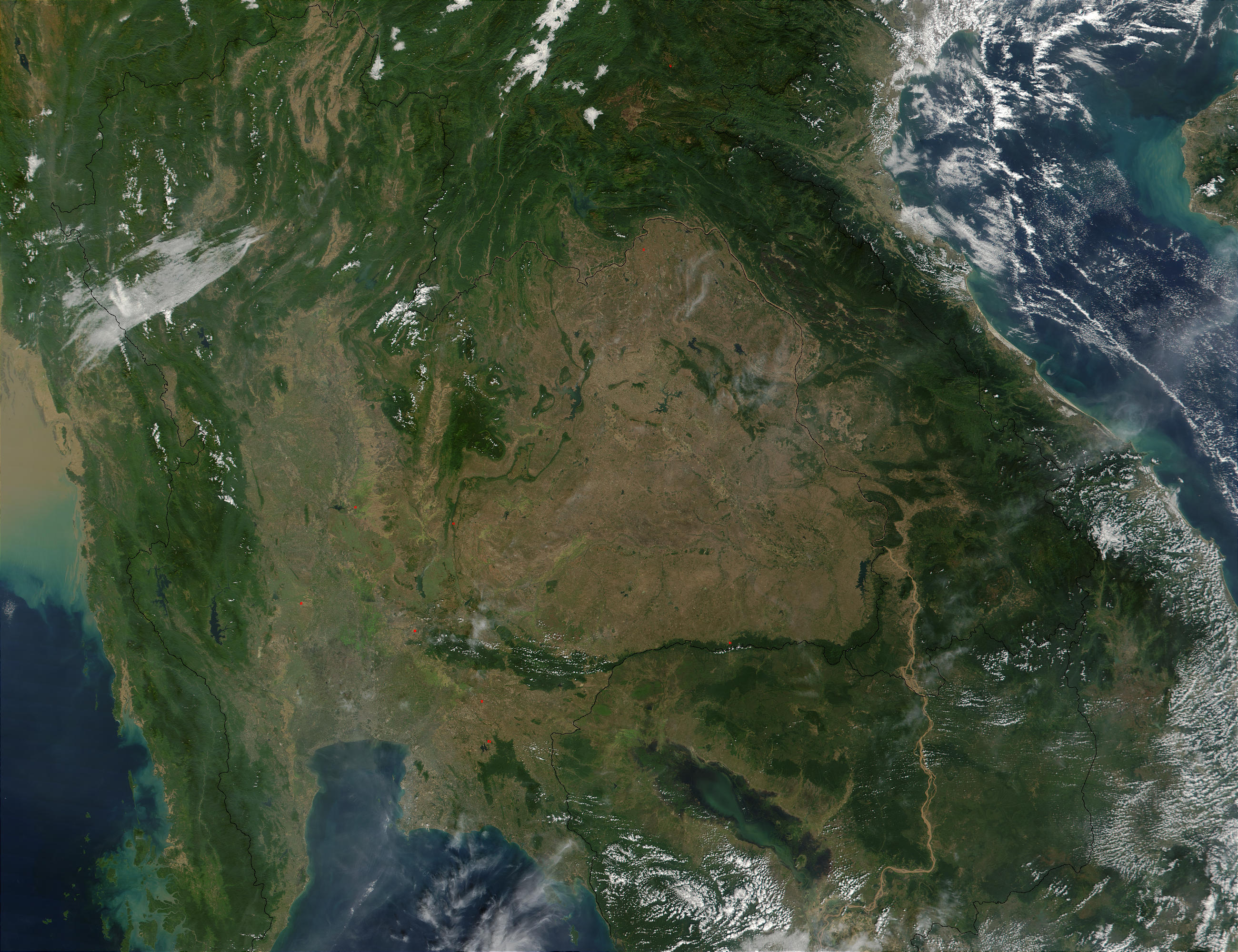
Thailand's borders with Laos and Cambodia are indicated by the brown expanse on the Thai side in this true-colour satellite image, which shows the effects of heavy deforestation.

Deforestation in Thailand refers to the conversion of its forested land to other uses. Deforestation numbers are inexact due to the scope of the issue. According to the Royal Forest Department (RFD) in 2019, Thai forests cover 31.6% (102 million rai) of Thailand's landmass. The department claims that forest coverage grew by 330,000 rai in 2018, an area equivalent in size to the island of Phuket. A year earlier, an academic claimed that, since 2016, forested area has declined by 18,000 rai, a significant improvement over the period 2008–2013, when a forested million rai were lost each year. In 1975, the government set a goal of 40% forest coverage—25% natural forest and 15% commercial forest—within 20 years. To achieve that target in 2018, 27 million rai would have to be afforested.

Between 1945 and 1975, forest cover in Thailand declined from 61% to 34% of the country's land area. Over the succeeding 11 years, Thailand lost close to 28% of all of its remaining forests. This means that the country lost 3.1% of its forest cover each year over that period. An estimate by the World Wildlife Fund concluded that between 1973 and 2009, 43% of forest loss in the Greater Mekong subregion occurred in Thailand and Vietnam.

The Thai Highlands in northern Thailand, the most heavily forested region of the country, were not subject to central government control and settlement until the second half of the 19th century when British timber firms, notably the Bombay Burmah Trading Corporation and the Borneo Company Limited, entered the teak trade in the late-1880s and early-1890s. The Royal Forest Department, created in 1896 and headed by a British forester until 1925, sought to conserve the forests against the worst business practices of British, Thai, and Chinese timber firms who worked in the region.

During the 20th century, deforestation in Thailand was driven primarily by agricultural expansion, although teak deforestation happened as a direct result of logging. The Royal Forest Department has been referred to as "Forest Death" by environmental activists and those living with a close relationship with the forest, as its general promotion of deforestation for logging and other agricultural ventures resulted in the large decline in forest cover. Much of the growth of cropland in the highlands of Thailand, where most of the deforestation has occurred, comes as a result of the growth and globalization of Thailand's agricultural economy and the relative scarcity of land available in the lowlands.

The Thai government, through both legislation and action of the Royal Forest Department, is beginning to emphasize forest restoration through a combination of policies seeking the reservation of existing forest land for conservation and the promotion of tree plantations to contribute to the amount of forest cover. Notably, the country's policies seeking to emphasize conservation and amelioration of upland forests have come into significant conflict with upland communities, whose traditional means of agricultural practice and habitation have been significantly impacted. In addition, a contingent of Buddhist monks in the country, known as "ecology monks", have become increasingly engaged in activities promoting environmental conservation and protection of original forest land.

== History of Thai forest management ==
- On 18 September 1896 King Chulalongkorn established the Royal Forest Department under the Ministry of the Interior to manage forests and control revenue from the teak forests of northern Thailand. A British forester from Burma, Herbert Slade, served as the first director of the department. From 1896 to 1925 the Thai government and British foresters and businesses created an "informal empire" over the teak forests of northern Thailand.
- In 1899 all forests were declared government property and all logging without payment to the Royal Forest Department was prohibited.
- In 1956 The Forest Industry Organization was established to establish governmental control of industrial uses of Thai forests.
- In 1962 the Thai government began to establish national parks and other forest conservation areas, their management under the jurisdiction of the Royal Forest Department. In the 1960s there was a large shift in forest use in Thailand. Deforestation began to increase, but not due to the commercial uses of teak forests in the north, but rather increased agricultural exports from the south.
- In the late-1960s the Thai government began to grant logging concessions, which required re-planting. They were poorly managed.
- A military coup in 1976 led to political instability. The military began to clear forests to suppress rebel forces who had settled in the forests for protection.
- Political instability left the government with little power to protect forests and illegal logging was pursued more heavily by villagers. During the height of illegal logging in Thailand it is estimated that somewhere between 50 and 75% of timber coming out of Thailand was obtained illegally.
- In the 1980s the government took steps to limit the speed at which Thailand's forests were disappearing. They set a target for 40% forest cover. To achieve this they initiated tree planting initiatives and leased some degraded forests to third parties to create logging plantations.
- In 1988 a flood in southern Thailand set in motion a complete ban on all commercial logging that was put in place in 1989. The government imposed a logging ban on 17 January 1989 in the form of a Cabinet Resolution (Order number 32/2532). This revoked all logging licenses in natural forests, effectively banning commercial logging, particularly in the uplands.

== Intact forest landscape ==
Intact forest landscape (IFL) "...is a seamless mosaic of forest and naturally treeless ecosystems with no remotely detected signs of human activity and a minimum area of 500 km^{2}". These areas must be undisturbed by human activities—they cannot be traversed by roads or deforested or harbor industrial operations. When any of these conditions apply, the ecosystems cease to be considered "intact". As of 2000 Thailand had 19,400 km^{2} of IFL, amounting to seven percent of its forested landscape. Over the period 2000–2013, 7.8% of Thailand's natural, intact forest landscape disappeared.

== Causes of deforestation in Thailand ==
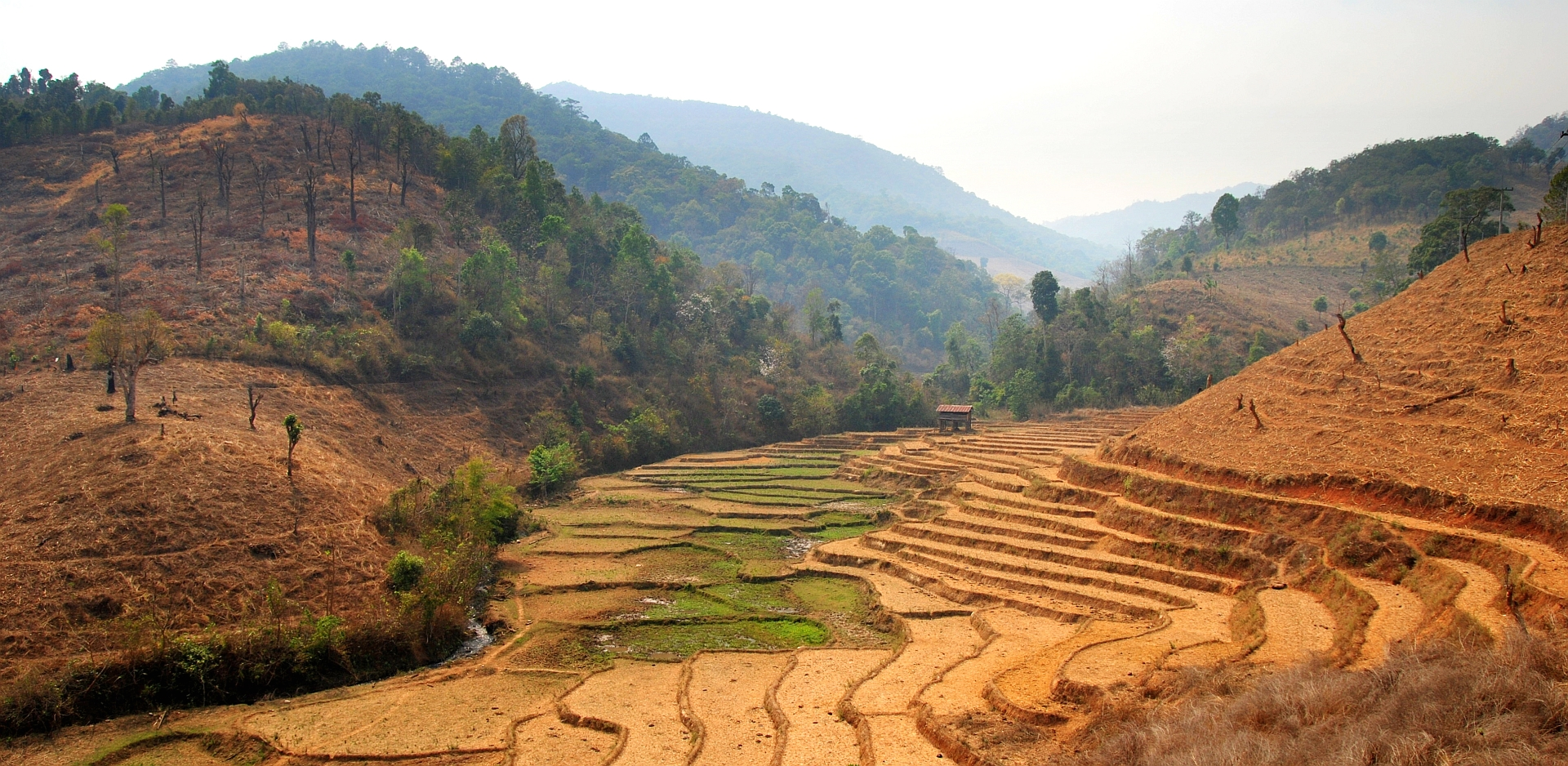
Rice paddies and recently cleared forest land in the Thanon Thong Chai Range, Chiang Mai Province

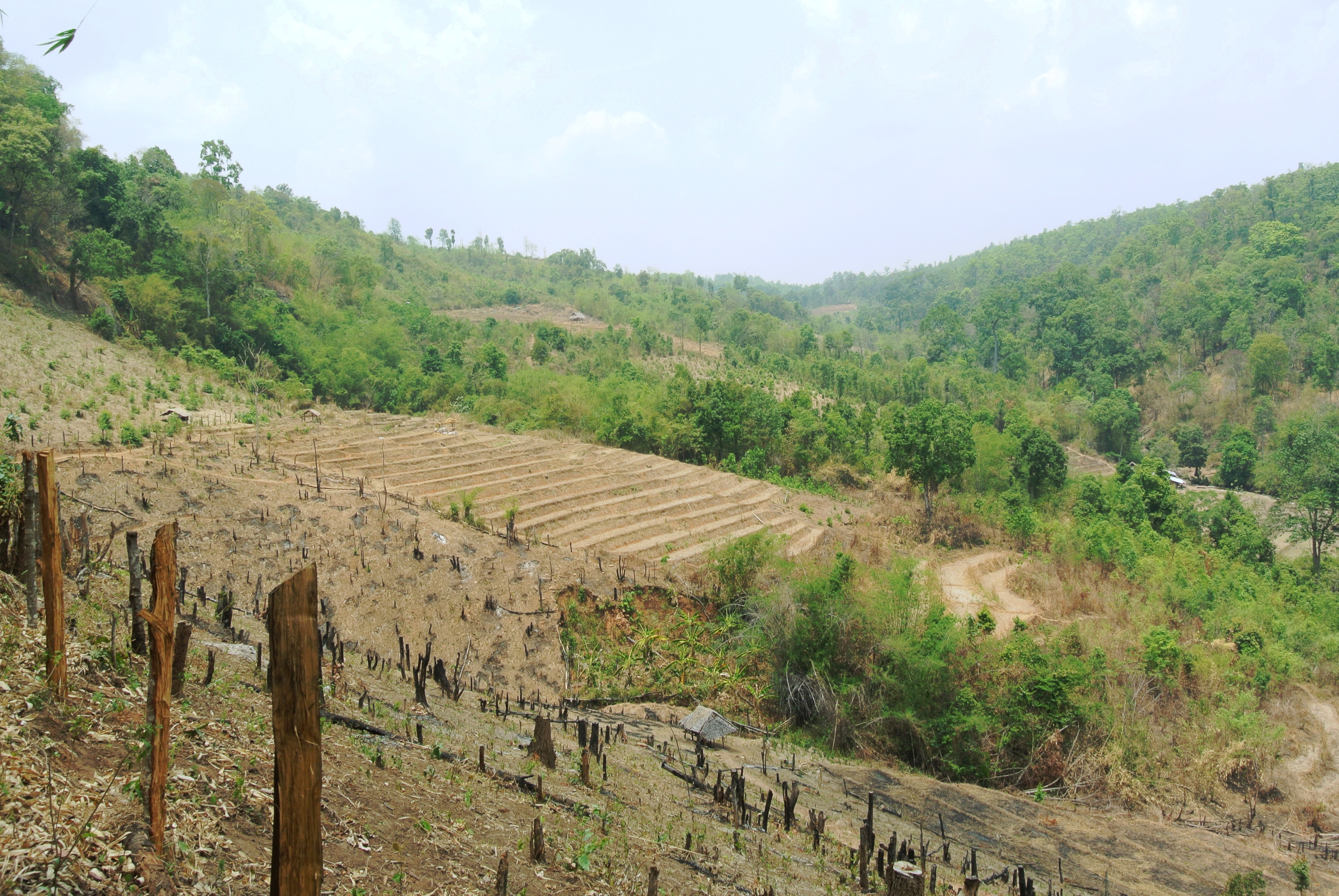
Controlled forest burns and rice fields cultivated by the Karen tribe in northern Thailand

=== Population growth ===
This is most evident in the northeast region of Thailand. The region is the most densely populated in the nation and has some of the least productive soils for agriculture. As populations increased, the need for food increased, and much forest land was cleared to increase food production.

=== Agricultural policy ===
The Thai government put controls on the price of rice, which encouraged farmers to explore alternative crops. However, the largest impact agricultural policy had on deforestation was the construction of roads following World War II. These roads were built to help farmers bring food products from rural areas to urban centers. This encouraged farmers to move away from subsistence farming and begin to farm on a larger scale.

=== Land ownership policy ===
Thailand is a nation where over 80% of land is owned by the richest 10% of the population and where property rights are ambiguous and are often interpreted differently by the various branches of the Thai government. The inability of many Thai citizens to secure property has resulted in their turning to forests to find space to farm. Often wildfires are deliberately set by local farmers, as well as by speculators who hire people to set forests on fire in order to claim land title deeds for the areas that have become "degraded forest".

=== Illegal logging ===
Governmental officials in charge of protected areas have contributed to deforestation by allowing illegal logging and illegal timber trading. King Bhumibol Adulyadej has blamed the destruction of Thailand's forested areas on the greed of some state officials. This is evident in places such as large protected swathes of northern Nan Province that were formerly covered with virgin forest and that have been deforested even while having national park status. Given that a mature, 30 year-old Siamese rosewood tree can fetch 300,000 baht on the black market, illegal logging is unlikely to disappear.

=== Climate change ===
Patterns of deforestation in Thailand have both contributed to and grown alongside trends of global climate change. During Thailand's agricultural boom of the late 20th century, an increasingly mechanized agricultural and forestry industry accelerated both industrial emissions and the rate of deforestation. As awareness of this behavior's ramifications for the climate became better known, Thailand and other Southeast Asian countries have attempted reforestation efforts to address the harm caused. The decline in Thailand's forest coverage has resulted in shifts in local temperatures, changes in patterns of seasonal rainfall, and soil erosion. As state reforestation efforts have continued on behalf of the state, climate change has decreased the natural biodiversity of plant life in the country's northern forests, complicating the viability of a return of original forest cover.

== Reforestation ==
Thailand's Ministry of Natural Resources and Environment's "20-Year Strategic Plan for the Ministry of Natural Resources and Environment (B.E. 2560 – 2579)" (2016–2036) addresses deforestion with its first strategy. Among other goals, it aims to raise the nation's forest cover to 40%. Twenty-five percent would consist of "conserved forests" and 15% "commercial forests". However, as of 2015, an estimated 24% of Thai forests were made up of commercial forest, or tree plantations, as a result of government actions to address deforestation through the promotion of reforestation programs. The prevalence of these commercial forests seems to counter some work to address deforestation's ecological contributions to climate change, as these planted forests lack traditional fallow periods which contribute to soil health.

Additionally, attempts by the Thai state to implement forest conservation policies have had significant impacts on upland ethnic groups, as limits on traditional farming practices and increasingly stringent policies on land ownership in natural forests have fundamentally altered these groups' relationship with the forest.

== Tree cover extent and loss ==
Global Forest Watch publishes annual estimates of tree cover loss and 2000 tree cover extent derived from time-series analysis of Landsat satellite imagery in the Global Forest Change dataset. In this framework, tree cover refers to vegetation taller than 5 m (including natural forests and tree plantations), and tree cover loss is defined as the complete removal of tree cover canopy for a given year, regardless of cause.

For Thailand, country statistics report cumulative tree cover loss of 2,691,177 ha (26,911.77 km^{2}) from 2001 to 2024 (about 13.5% of its 2000 tree cover area). For tree cover density greater than 30%, country statistics report a 2000 tree cover extent of 19,955,449 ha (199,554.49 km^{2}). The charts and table below display this data. In simple terms, the annual loss number is the area where tree cover disappeared in that year, and the extent number shows what remains of the 2000 tree cover baseline after subtracting cumulative loss. Forest regrowth is not included in the dataset.

Annual tree cover loss in Thailand, 2001–2024. View chart definition.
Tree cover extent in 2000 minus cumulative tree cover loss in Thailand, 2001–2024 (loss-only residual; does not account for gain). View chart definition.

Annual tree cover extent and loss
Year	Tree cover extent (km2) (Note: This residual measure does not include forest regrowth.)	Annual tree cover loss (km2)
2001	199,193.56	360.93
2002	198,584.76	608.80
2003	198,000.40	584.36
2004	197,082.39	918.01
2005	196,239.79	842.60
2006	195,241.79	998.00
2007	194,315.61	926.18
2008	193,514.42	801.19
2009	192,188.17	1,326.25
2010	190,839.40	1,348.77
2011	189,894.18	945.22
2012	188,749.39	1,144.79
2013	187,902.00	847.39
2014	186,526.08	1,375.92
2015	185,318.57	1,207.51
2016	183,602.73	1,715.84
2017	181,639.21	1,963.52
2018	180,304.04	1,335.17
2019	179,006.34	1,297.70
2020	177,812.42	1,193.92
2021	176,584.48	1,227.94
2022	175,477.89	1,106.59
2023	174,059.29	1,418.60
2024	172,642.72	1,416.57

== REDD+ forest reference level and monitoring ==
Thailand has submitted a national forest reference emission level (FREL) and forest reference level (FRL) under the UNFCCC REDD+ framework; the 2021 submission was subject to a UNFCCC technical assessment and has an assessed reference level on the UNFCCC REDD+ Web Platform. On the platform, the other Warsaw Framework elements (national strategy/action plan, safeguards, and a national forest monitoring system) are listed as “not reported”.

In the technical assessment, Thailand’s assessed FREL was defined as the annual average of gross emissions from deforestation in natural forest over the 2006–2016 reference period, and was assessed at 12,341,444 t CO2 eq per year (revised from 15,326,056 t CO2 eq per year in the original submission). Thailand’s assessed FRL for the same period was −28,622,811 t CO2 eq per year (revised from −31,511,649 t CO2 eq per year), representing the net effect of emissions from forest degradation and removals from enhancement of forest carbon stocks (including conversion of non-forest land to forest land) reported as a single aggregated value due to technical limitations.

The assessment report notes that Thailand estimated activity data using a sample-based approach applied to national forest/non-forest maps for 2006 and 2016, and derived emission factors mainly from Thailand’s national forest inventory (with separate data for mangroves). The FREL/FRL included above-ground and below-ground biomass pools and CO2 only, excluding litter, deadwood and soil organic carbon.

== See also ==
- Environmental issues in Thailand
