= Office of the National Water Resources =

Thailand water management office reporting to the prime minister

- สำนักงานทรัพยากรน้ำแห่งชาติ
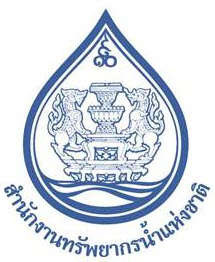

Agency overview
- Formed: 25 October 2017
- Headquarters: Lak Si, Bangkok
- Annual budget: 750 million baht (FY2019)
- Agency executive: Surasri Kittimonthon, Secretary-General
- Parent department: Office of the Prime Minister
- Website: Official website

The Office of the National Water Resources (Abrv: ONWR; Thai: สำนักงานทรัพยากรน้ำแห่งชาติ, RTGS: samnakngan sapphayakon nam haeng chat) is Thailand's command centre for management of the nation's water resources. As of 2020, ONWR is led by Secretary-General Somkiat Prajamwong.

== History ==
In 2000, Thailand published Thailand's Water Vision. The vision noted "…two major obstacles to effective water management in Thailand: the lack of clear policies and the lack of coordination among organizations. Water resources are administered and managed by eight ministries with different priorities and programmes that sometimes overlap or are in conflict." The water vision initiative would lead ultimately to a restructuring of the nation's water management policies and a 20-year national strategy.

On 25 October 2017, NCPO leader Prayut Chan-o-cha used the extraordinary powers granted him by Section 44 of the interim constitution to issue Order Number 46/2017 to establish the Office of the National Water Resources under the Office of the Prime Minister, reporting directly to the prime minister. Initially, nearly 200 employees were seconded to the ONWR from the Royal Irrigation Department (RID), Agriculture Ministry, and the Department of Water Resources (DWR) from the Ministry of Natural Resources and Environment in order to begin work immediately. Several bureaus previously under the two departments were also transferred to the new office.

For decades Thailand has oscillated between droughts and floods. After the 2011 Thailand floods, the Yingluck administration made an effort to consolidate water management in the hands of one body. Japanese consultant Tsuruyo Funatsu had found that seven ministries and 15 agencies had a hand in water management prior to the 2011 floods, all protecting their turf and often working at cross purposes. The ONWR itself counts 48 water agencies across seven ministries. ONWR's task is to get them all playing together as a team like the coordinated football team depicted in an ONWR-produced video that stars the ONWR director-general as the coach of the newly transformed team.

== Strategy ==
The Thai cabinet approved a water management strategy composed of four "pillars":

1. A 20-year master plan on water management, 2018–2037
2. The creation of a central agency to manage water. Key players here are the ONWR, the National Water Resources Committee chaired by the prime minister, and 22 River Basin Committees.
3. Establish a legal foundation. The Water Resources Act B.E. 2561 (2018) came into force on 27 January 2019 as a baseline with more specificity to follow.
4. Innovation

== Organisation and budget ==
- The ONWR functions as the water management executive agency, responsible for carrying out national water strategies as embedded in the national plan.
- The National Water Resource Committee (NWRC) functions as the legislative branch of water management. The 20-member body, presided over by the prime minister, includes five cabinet ministers, six River Basin Committee members, the head of the budget bureau, and the secretaries-general of the Office of the National Economic and Social Development Council (NESDC) and the Office of the Royal Development Projects Board. It vets project proposals from the ONWR prior to submission for cabinet approval.
- There are 22 River Basin Committees representing the topographic hydrology of Thailand's land mass. Each provides in-depth knowledge of local conditions and the needs of their inhabitants.

The ONWR was allocated a budget of 749.7 million baht for FY2019.
