= Tiger Temple =

Theravada Buddhist temple in Thailand

Coordinates: 14°6′57″N 99°13′53″E

Tiger Temple, or Wat Pha Luang Ta Bua Yanasampanno (Thai: วัดป่าหลวงตาบัว ญาณสัมปันโน), was a Theravada Buddhist temple in the Sai Yok District of Thailand's Kanchanaburi Province in the west of the country. It was founded in 1994 as a forest temple and sanctuary for wild animals, among them tigers, mostly Indochinese tigers. A "commercial" temple, Tiger Temple charged an admission fee. The temple has been closed to the public since 2016.

In May 2016, the Thailand Wildlife Conservation Office (WCO) began capturing and relocating the tigers, intending to close the facility. Authorities counted 137 tigers on the premises, and the frozen bodies of 40 cubs, some of them dead for more than five years.

== The tigers ==
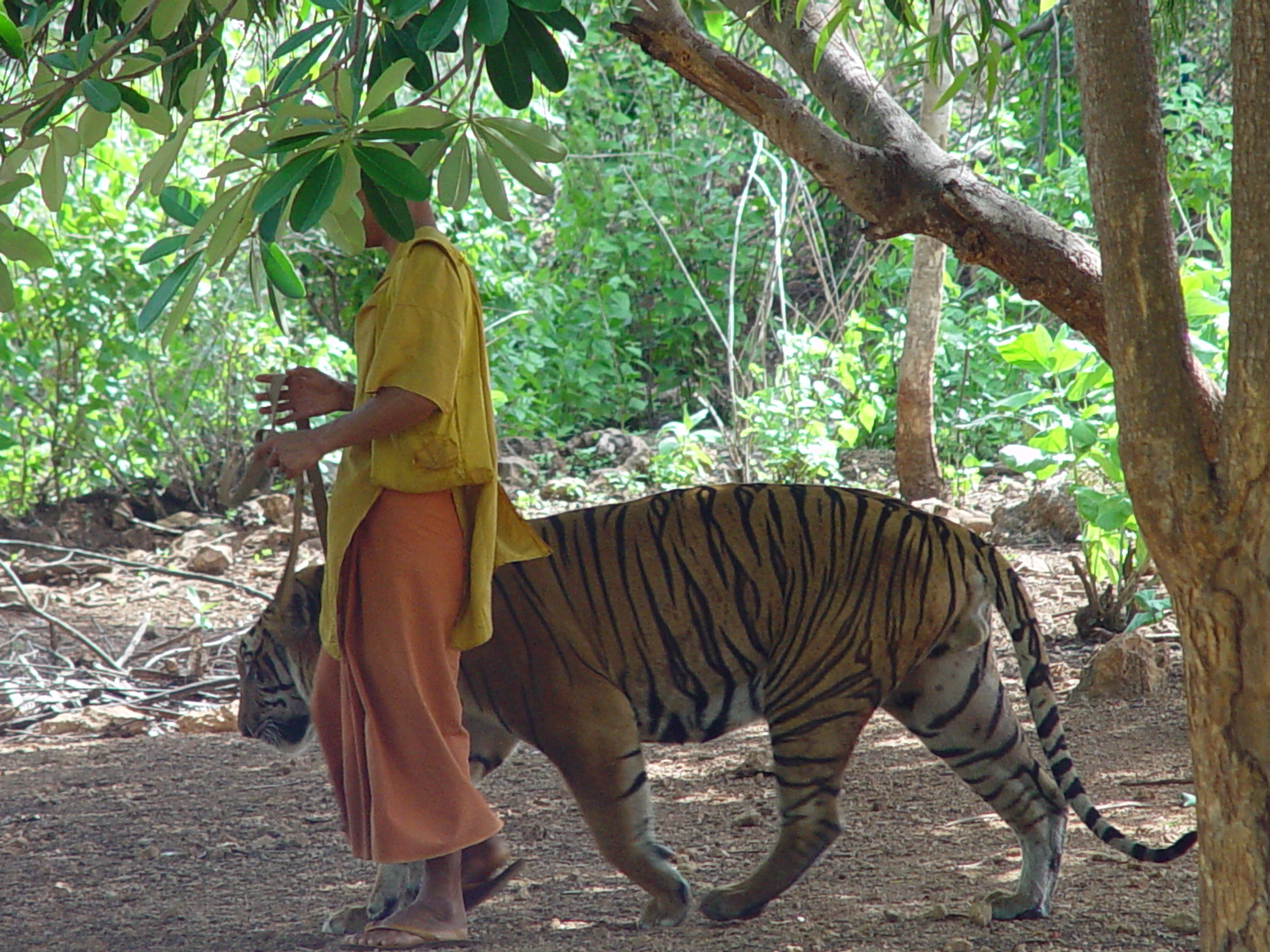
Monk walking tiger on a leash

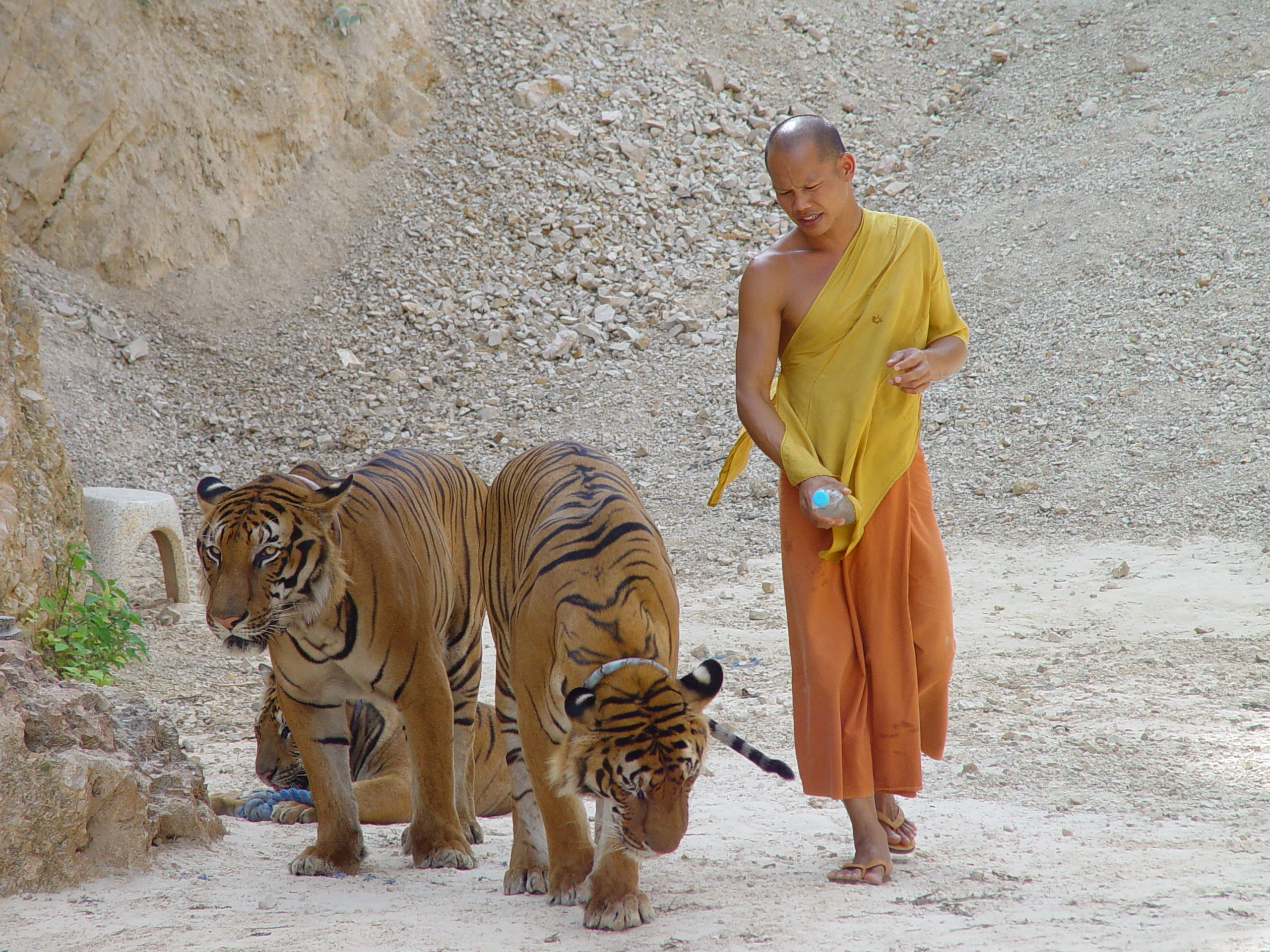
Monk and tigers during walk in the quarry

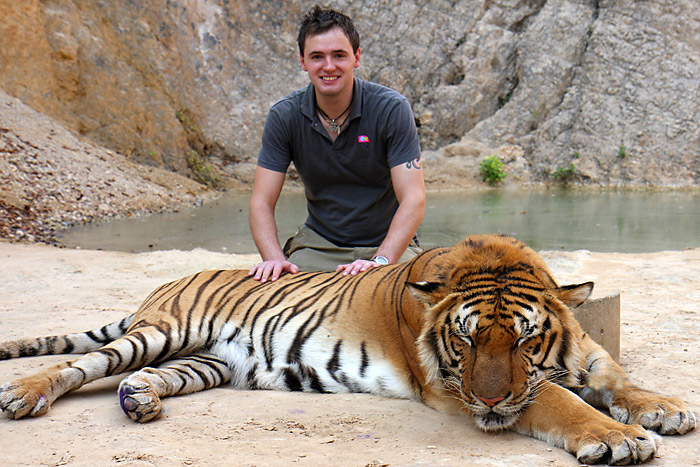
Visitors could take a photo with a grown tiger or a small cub

The temple received its first tiger cub in 1999. Several others were later given to the temple. The facility began a tiger breeding program, in which the cubs were weaned from their mothers soon after birth so that the females would more rapidly produce another litter. Visitors paid a fee to pet and feed and play with the cubs, and take selfies with them. This generated some $3 million of revenue for the facility annually, even though the facility was not allowed to breed or make money from the tigers. By January 2016, the number of tigers confined at the temple exceeded 150.

== Allegations of animal abuse and illegal wildlife trafficking ==
Animal welfare advocates accused the organization of mistreating the tigers for commercial gain and trafficking some of its animals. Care for the Wild International reported in 2008 that the Tiger Temple was involved in the smuggling of wildlife and breeding of tigers without a proper license. These activities violate CITES, an international treaty on wildlife to which Thailand is a signatory, which bans commercial breeding of protected wild animals such as tigers.

Based on the Care for the Wild International report, a coalition of 39 conservation groups, including the Humane Society International, the Association of Zoos and Aquariums, World Animal Protection, and the World Wide Fund for Nature, sent a letter to the director-general of the Department of National Parks, Wildlife and Plant Conservation (DNP) under the name "The International Tiger Coalition". The letter urged the director general to take action against the Tiger Temple over its import and export of 12 tigers with Laos, its lack of connection with accredited conservation breeding programs, and to genetically test the tigers at the Tiger Temple to determine their pedigree and value to tiger conservation programs. The letter concluded that the temple lacked the facilities, the skills, the relationships with accredited zoos, or even the desire to properly manage its tigers. Instead, it is motivated purely by profit.

In 2014, Care for the Wild International called for an end to "tiger selfies" in a global campaign coinciding with International Tiger Day. The charity's CEO, Philip Mansbridge, was quoted as saying: "I know people will immediately think we're overreacting or just out to spoil people's fun. But the reality is, one quick pic for you means a lifetime of suffering for that animal."

In January and May 2016, two reports spanning nine years of investigations were released by the Australian organisation Cee4life (Conservation and Environmental Education 4 Life) The first Cee4life report contains CCTV, recordings, and witness statements regarding the disappearance of tigers at Tiger Temple. The second report contains evidence of tiger body part sales, gifting and international transport. National Geographic alleged that the Buddhist monks there are operating a for-profit breeding, sales, and exploitation business with the tigers at the temple.

== Investigation, confiscation of animal and closure of facility ==
On 2 February 2015, officials from the DNP began an investigation of the temple. After initially being rebuffed, they returned the following day with a warrant, police, and soldiers. The investigation and site inspection failed to produce evidence to support the allegations of illegal wildlife trafficking. Charges were, however pressed for the unlicensed possession of 38 protected birds found on the grounds of the facility. The officials seized the protected wild birds and impounded the tigers on the premises, pending further investigation into their documentation.

In late May 2016, police and wildlife officials began an operation to remove all living tigers at Tiger Temple. During the operation, officials found over 40 tiger cub corpses as well as numerous body parts from other animals preserved in freezers. According to a representative of the Department of National Parks, the tiger cubs had died only a short time before the raid. The temple, however, had not reported the birth of any tigers for months. This was seen as a sign for hidden illegal breeding. Some twelve living hornbills were also confiscated as being possessed without a license. The abbot's secretary was stopped from leaving the site with over 1000 amulets containing pieces of tiger skin, two whole tiger skins, and nine or ten tiger fangs. He and four other persons are investigated for alleged wildlife smuggling. The temple was closed to the public at the beginning of the raid. On 3 June, another thirty carcasses of tiger cubs were found in containers with English-language labels, suggesting that they might have been for sale.

== Aftermath ==
=== Attempts to re-open the facility ===
After the closure of the facility, there were several attempts made to reopen it or to create an offshoot. One of these took place months after the scandal, as a business associated with the temple was moving forward with plans to build a new tiger zoo nearby that could eventually house up to 500 tigers (the business sought to acquire at least an additional 105 tigers to help it reach this goal). This did not go through. Thailand's Tiger Temple planned to reopen as a commercial zoo in 2018, bringing in 24 new tigers despite previous discoveries of animal abuse, dead cubs and suspected wildlife trafficking, with around 1,500 tigers were held in captivity across Thailand, concerns about commercial breeding, exploitation for tourism and the lack of effective wildlife protection have been raised. As of 2026, the facility has not re-opened.
