= Tourism in Thailand =

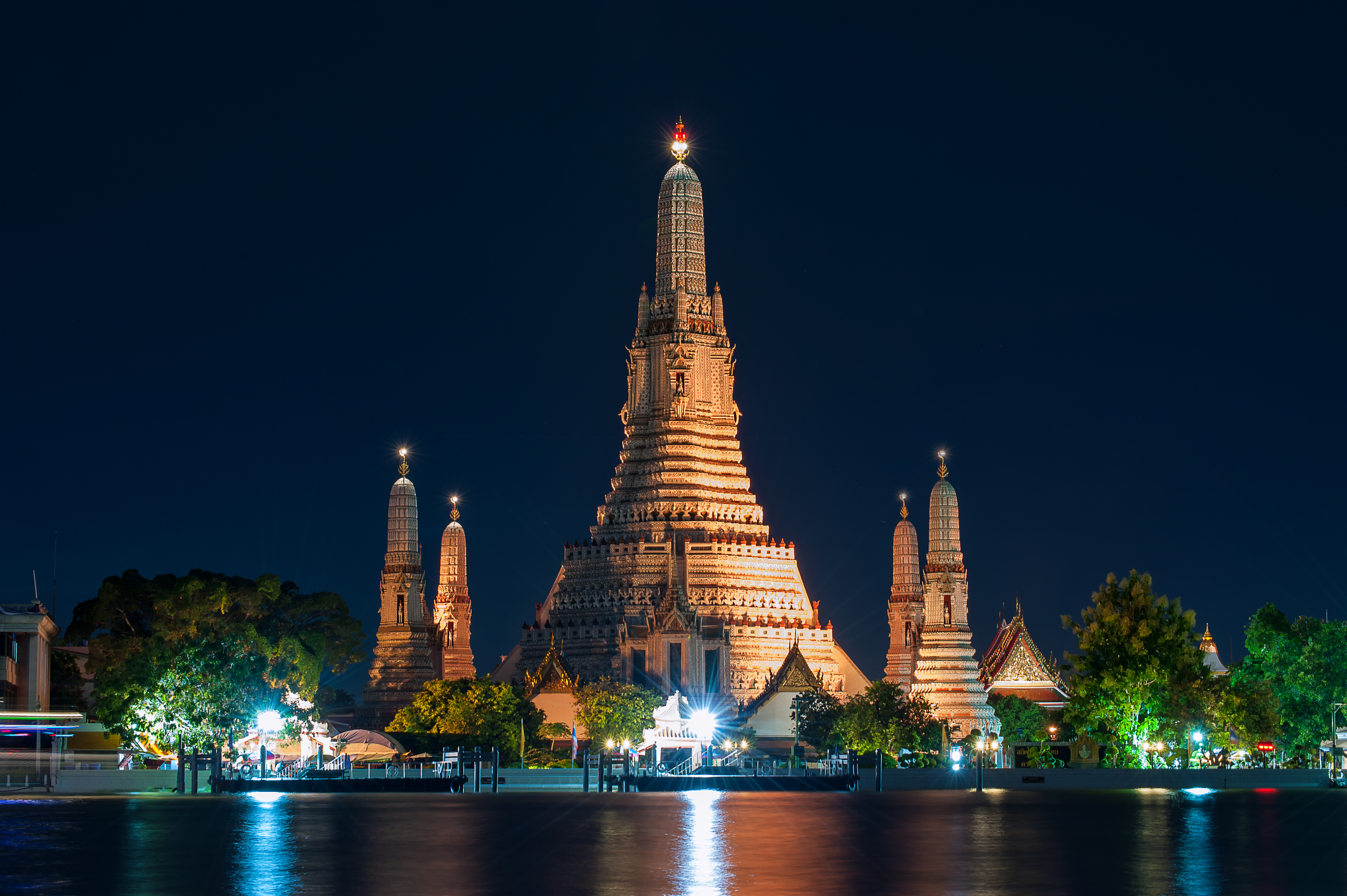
Wat Arun, Bangkok is among the best known of Thailand's landmarks.

Tourism is an economic contributor to Thailand. Estimates of tourism revenue directly contributing to the GDP of 12 trillion baht range from one trillion baht (2013) 2.53 trillion baht (2016), the equivalent of 9% to 17.7% of GDP. When including indirect travel and tourism receipts, the 2014 total is estimated to be the equivalent to 19.3% (2.3 trillion baht) of Thailand's GDP.

In 2023, Thailand’s tourism recovery accelerated, with international arrivals surpassing 28 million as the government expanded visa-free entry for key markets and airlines increased regional capacity. According to the secretary-general of the Office of the National Economic and Social Development Council in 2019, projections indicate the tourism sector will account for 30% of GDP by 2030, up from 20% in 2019, Thailand is expected to receive 80 million visitors in 2027.

Tourism worldwide in 2017 accounted for 10.4% of global GDP and 313 million jobs, or 9.9% of total employment. Most governments view tourism as an easy moneymaker and a shortcut to economic development. The success of tourism is measured by the number of visitors.

Prior to the COVID-19 pandemic, Thailand was ranked the world’s eighth most visited country by World Tourism rankings compiled by the United Nations World Tourism Organization. In 2019, Thailand received 39.8 million international tourists, ahead of the United Kingdom and Germany, and received fourth-highest international tourism earnings, at US$60.5 billion. Following the COVID-19 pandemic, tourism rebounded to similar levels. In 2024, the number of international tourists was projected to be 39.8 million. However, that year only attracted 35.55 million international tourists.

The Tourism Authority of Thailand (TAT), a state enterprise under the Ministry of Tourism and Sports, uses the slogan "Amazing Thailand" to promote Thailand internationally. In 2015, this was supplemented by a "Discover Thainess" campaign.

Yearly tourist arrivals in millions

== Overview ==
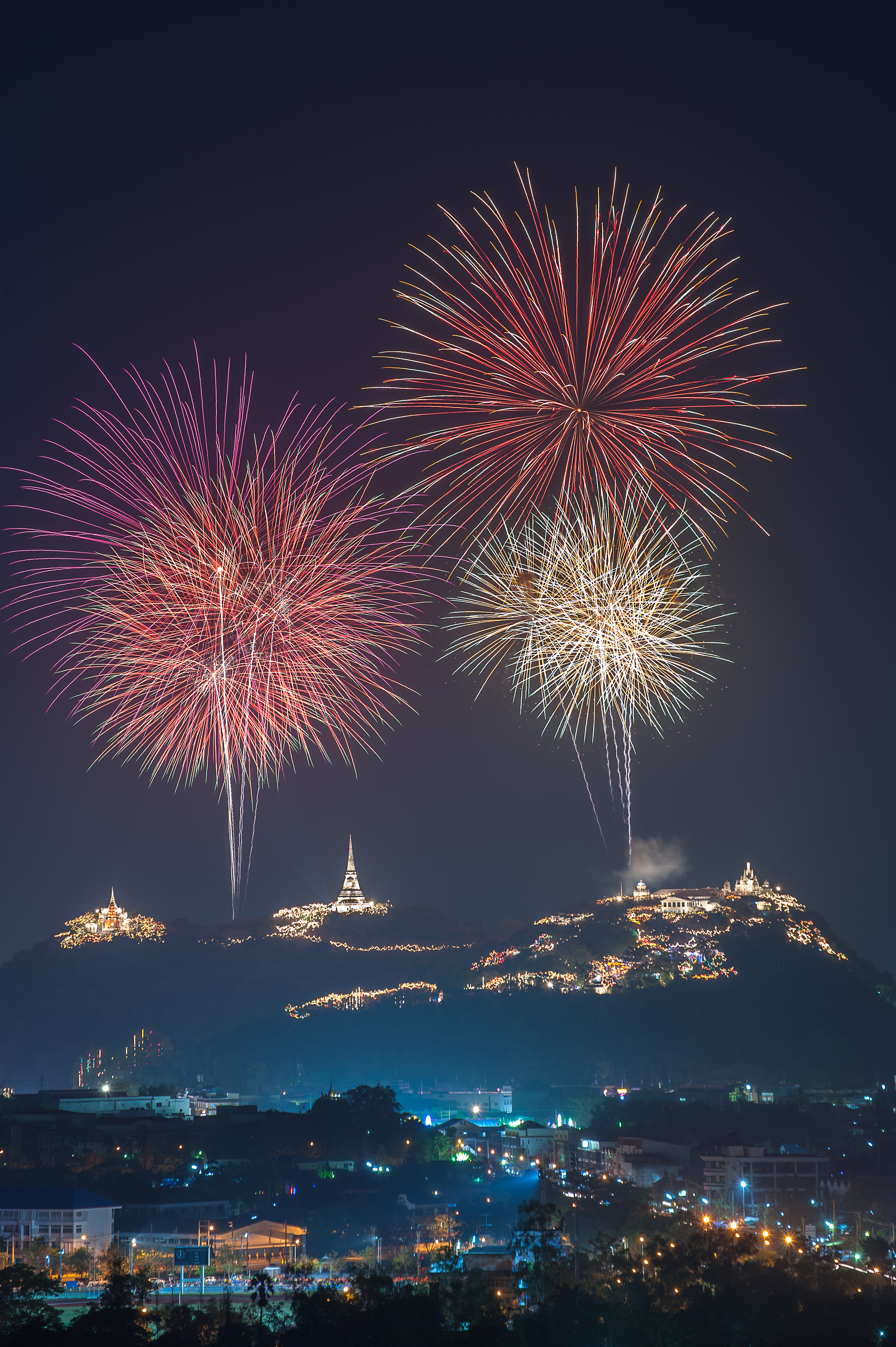
Fireworks at Phra Nakhon Khiri Historical Park, Phetchaburi

Among the reasons for the increase in tourism in the 1960s were the stable political atmosphere and the development of Bangkok as a crossroads of international air transport. The hotel industry and retail industry both expanded rapidly due to tourist demand. It was boosted by the presence of US GIs who arrived in the 1960s for rest and recuperation (R&R) during the Vietnam War. During this time, international tourism was becoming the new trend as living standards increased throughout the world and travel became faster and more dependable with the introduction of new technology in the air transport sector.

Tourist numbers have grown from 336,000 foreign visitors and 54,000 GIs on R&R in 1967 to 32.59 million foreign guests visiting Thailand in 2016. The Tourism Authority of Thailand (TAT) claims that the tourist industry earned 2.52 trillion baht (US$71.4 billion) in 2016, up 11% from 2015. TAT officials said their revenue estimates, for foreign and domestic tourists combined, show that tourism revenue for all of 2017 may surpass earlier forecasts of 2.77 trillion baht (US$78.5 billion).

In 2015, 6.7 million people arrived from ASEAN countries and the number is expected to grow to 8.3 million in 2016, generating 245 billion baht. The largest numbers of Western tourists came from Russia (6.5%), the UK (3.7%), Australia (3.4%) and the US (3.1%). Around 60% of Thailand's tourists are return visitors.

In 2014, 4.6 million Chinese visitors travelled to Thailand. In 2015, Chinese tourists numbered 7.9 million or 27% of all international tourist arrivals, 29.8 million; 8.75 million Chinese tourists visited Thailand in 2016. In 2017, 27% of the tourists that came to Thailand came from China. Thailand relies heavily on Chinese tourists to meet its tourism revenue target of 2.2 trillion baht in 2015 and 2.3 trillion in 2016. However, in 2020, it was reported that Chinese tourists now ranked Thailand as third most popular foreign tourist destination, having been the top previously.

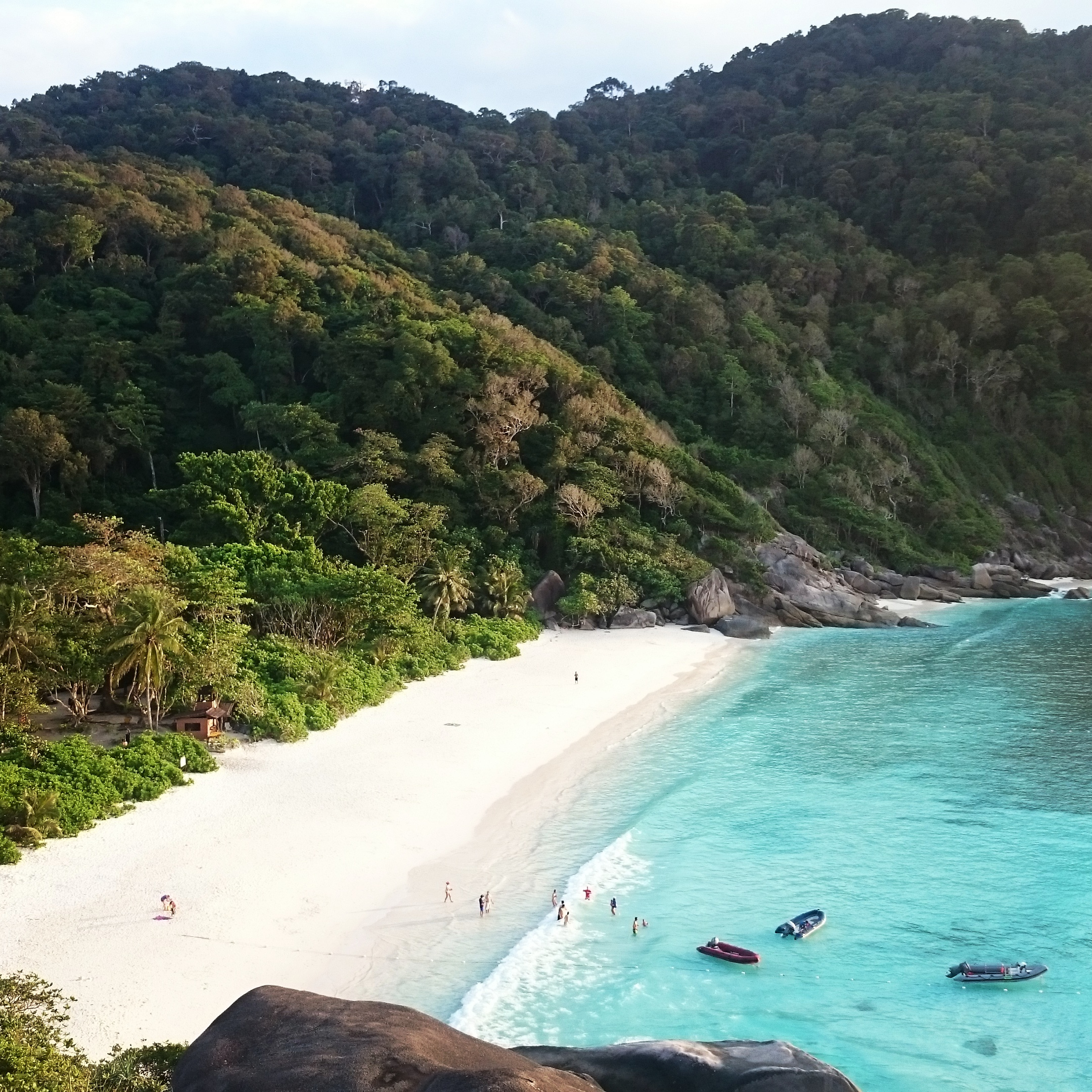
Donald Duck Bay, Ko Similan

It is estimated that the average Chinese tourist remains in the country for one week and spends 30,000–40,000 baht (US$1,000–1,300) per person, per trip. The average Chinese tourist spends 6,400 baht (US$180) per day—more than the average visitor's 5,690 baht (US$160). According to Thailand's Tourism Authority, the number of Chinese tourists rose by 93% in the first quarter of 2013, an increase that was attributed to the popularity of the Chinese film Lost in Thailand that was filmed in the northern province of Chiang Mai. Chinese media outlets have claimed that Thailand superseded Hong Kong as the top destination for Chinese travellers during the 2013 May Day holiday. In 2013, the Chinese National Tourism Administration published A Guide to Civilized Tourism which has specific statements regarding how to act as a tourist in Thailand.

In 2015, Thailand hosted 1.43 million Japanese travellers, up 4.1% from 2015, generating 61.4 billion baht, up 6.3%. In 2016, Thailand expects 1.7 million Japanese tourists, generating 66.2 billion baht in revenue.

TAT estimates that 1.9 million Indian tourists visited in 2019, up 22% from 2018, generating 84 billion baht in revenue, up 27%.

To accommodate foreign visitors, the Thai government established a separate tourism police force with offices in the major tourist areas and its own central emergency telephone number.

Since the opening of the Vietnam, Cambodia, and Laos borders in the late 1900s, competition has increased because Thailand no longer has the monopoly on tourism in Southeast Asia. Destinations like Angkor Wat, Luang Prabang and Halong Bay now rival Thailand's former monopoly in mainland Southeast Asia. To counter this, Thailand is targeting niche markets such as golf holidays, holidays combined with medical treatment or visits to military installations. Thailand also plans to become the hub of Buddhist tourism in the region.

=== International rankings ===
In 2008, Pattaya was 23rd with 4,406,300 visitors, Phuket 31st with 3,344,700 visitors, and Chiang Mai ranked 78th place with 1,604,600 visitors. In a list released by Instagram that identified the ten most photographed locations worldwide in 2012, Suvarnabhumi Airport and Siam Paragon shopping mall were ranked number one and two respectively, more popular than New York City's Times Square or Paris's Eiffel Tower. In 2013, Thailand was the 10th "top tourist destination" in the world tourism rankings with 26.5 million international arrivals. In the MasterCard 2014 and 2015 Global Destination Cities Index, Bangkok ranked the second of the world's top-20 most-visited cities, trailing only London. The U.S. News' 2017 Best Countries report ranked Thailand at 4th globally for adventure value and 7th for cultural heritage.

The Travel and Tourism Competitiveness Report 2015 published by the World Economic Forum ranked Thailand 35 of 141 nations. Among the metrics used to arrive at the rankings, Thailand scored high on "Natural Resources" (16 of 141 nations) and "Tourist Service Infrastructure" (21 of 141), but low on "Environmental Sustainability" (116 of 141) and "Safety and Security" (132 of 141).

In 2016, Bangkok ranked 1st surpassing London and New York City in Euromonitor International's list of "Top City Destinations" with 21 million visitors. In 2019, Bangkok ranked 1st surpassing Paris and London in Mastercard's list of "Global Destination Cities Index 2019" with 22.78 million visitors. Phuket was 14th with 9.89 million visitors and Pattaya 15th with 9.44 million visitors.

Global Destination Cities Index 2019
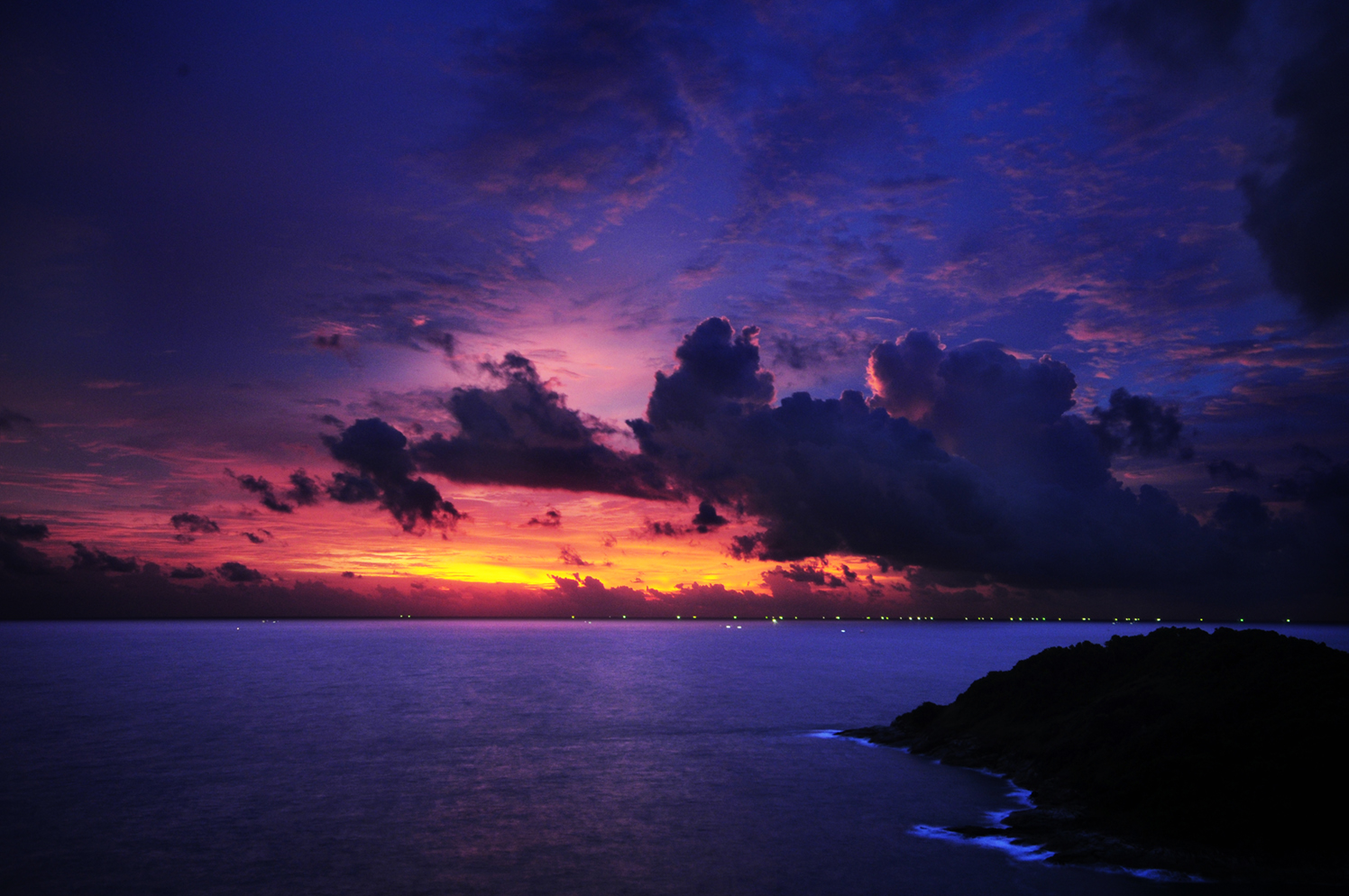
Phuket ranked 14th with 9.89 million visitors

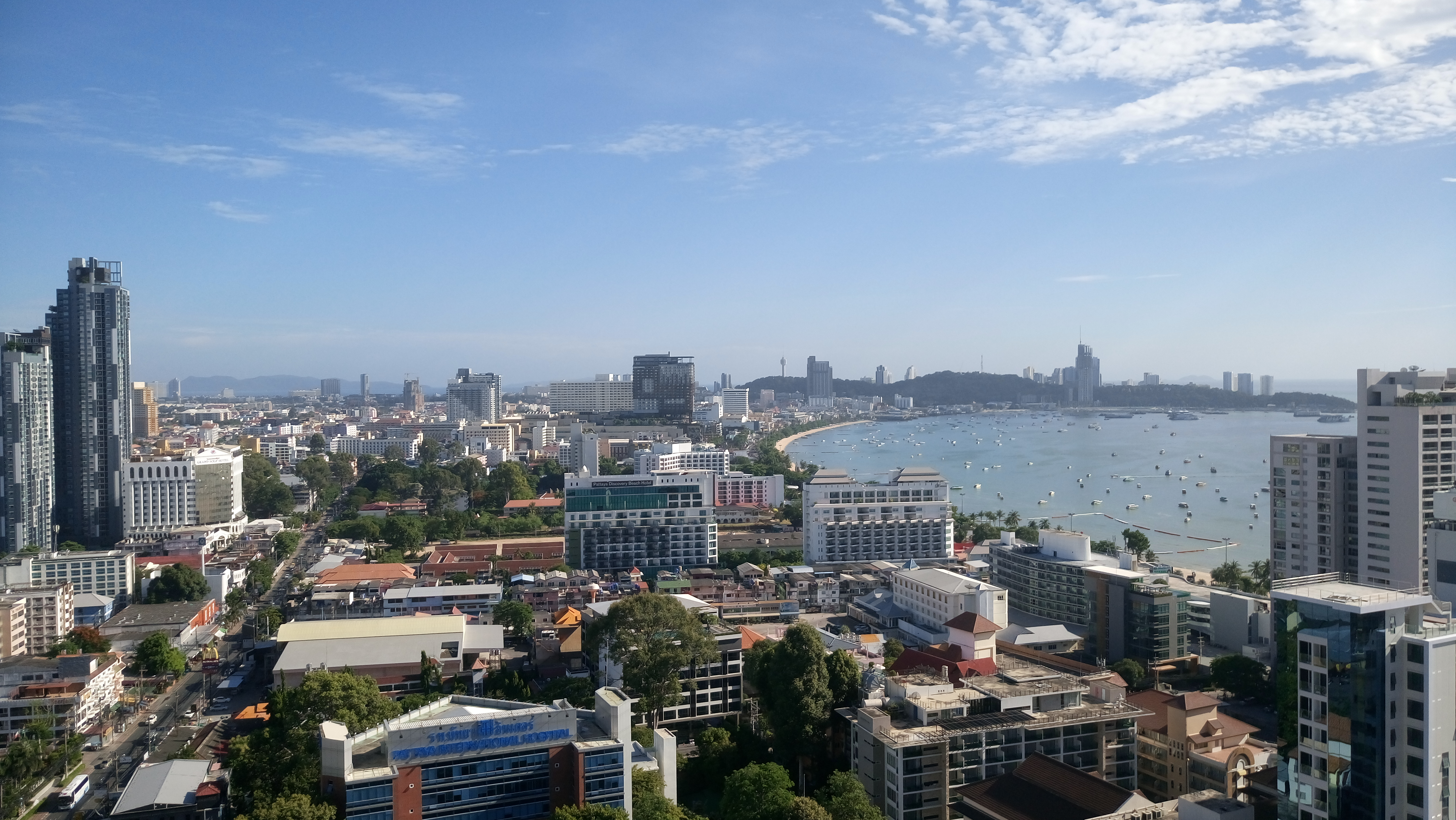
Pattaya ranked 15th with 9.44 million visitors

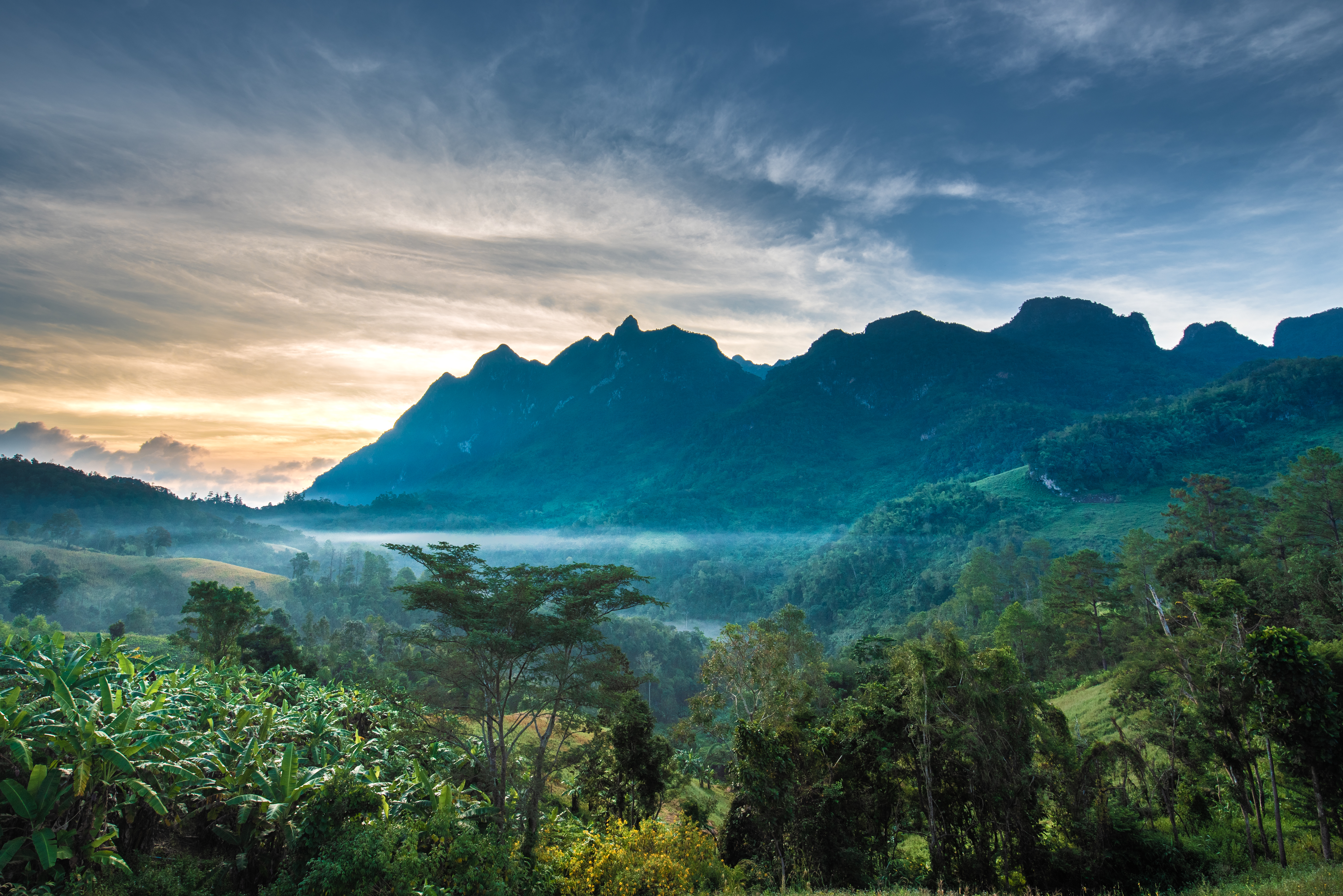
Chiang Mai with 6.38 million visitors

=== Impact of the 2004 tsunami ===
In December 2004, the Indian Ocean tsunami had a significant impact on Thailand’s tourism industry, particularly in Phuket, Khao Lak, Krabi, and other coastal areas along the Andaman Sea. Many beachfront resorts and tourism-related businesses were destroyed or damaged, and thousands of tourists were among the victims. International arrivals dropped sharply in early 2005 as safety concerns and infrastructure damage affected travel demand. However, with substantial domestic and international aid, rapid reconstruction efforts, and global media attention, Thailand’s tourism sector recovered quickly. By 2006, visitor numbers had returned to near pre-tsunami levels.

=== Impact of political unrest ===
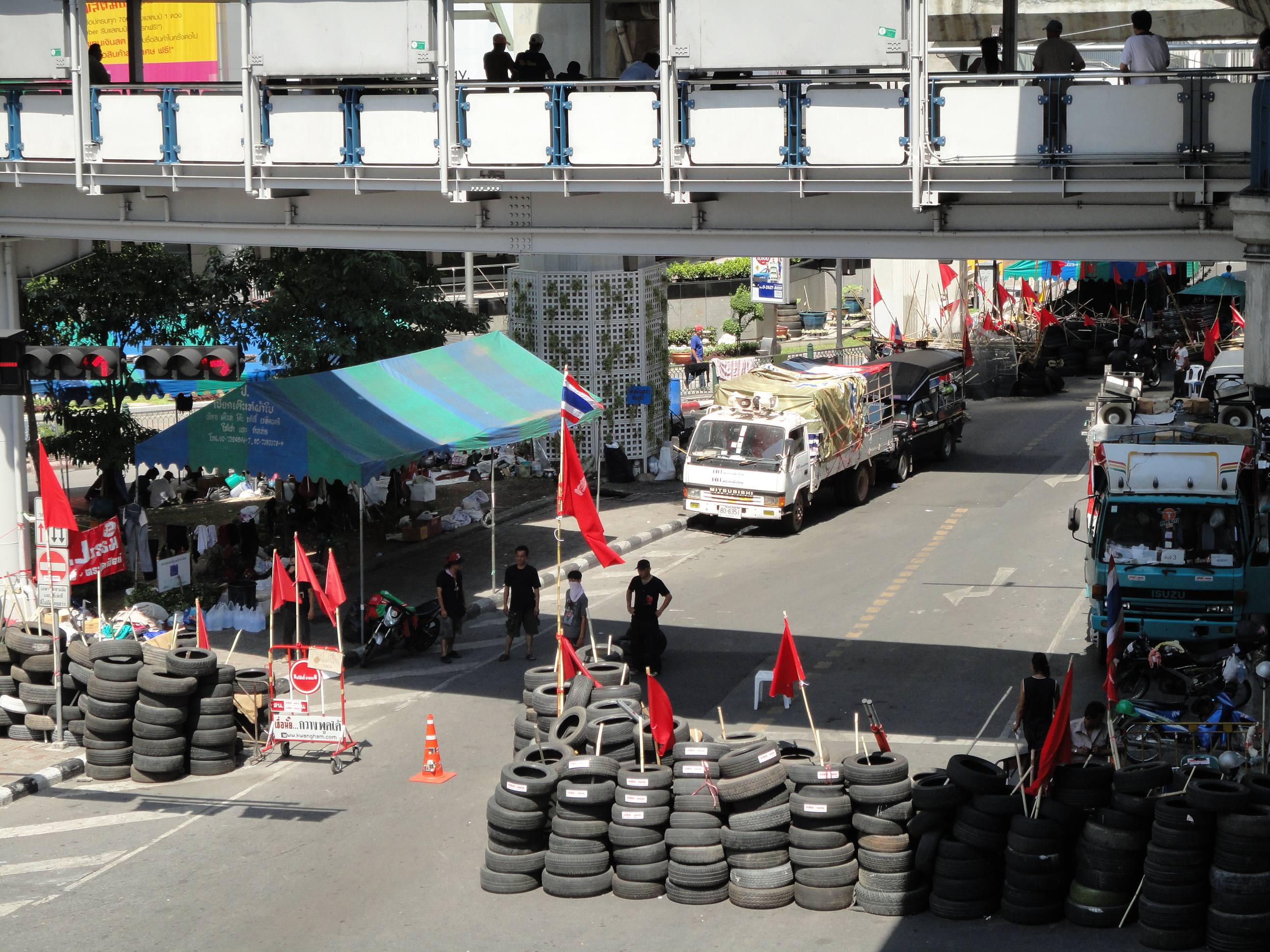
The UDD Redshirts protest brought disruption to Bangkok in April 2010

Political unrest in Thailand has significantly affected its tourism industry, with several incidents contributing to declining visitor numbers and investor confidence. In 2010, the Redshirt protests caused the blocking and shutdown of various malls and streets in central Bangkok, causing tourists to reconsider their travel to Bangkok, with an economic cost of millions of dollars per day.

In late 2013, violent clashes in Bangkok led to a decline in hotel bookings and cancellations of major events. The Tourism Authority of Thailand (TAT) reported reduced bookings from key markets, such as Australia, where growth expectations fell from over 10% to just 3.6%. The protests prompted travel advisories from 31 countries, with tourism income facing potential losses of 25 billion baht. The Meetings, Incentives, Conventions, and Exhibitions (MICE) sector also saw a 30% cancellation rate. Despite these challenges, the TAT maintained its tourism targets for 2013, aiming for 26.1 million arrivals and 1.18 trillion baht in revenue.

The situation worsened in 2014 with escalating political turmoil, including the shutdown of Bangkok's government offices by protesters in January. This led to a further decline in tourism, with the TAT forecasting a 5% drop in arrivals for the first quarter. Ultimately, tourist arrivals for 2014 fell to 24.7 million, a 6.6% decrease from 2013, and revenues dropped by 5.8% to 1.13 trillion baht. Contributing factors included both the political crisis and the devaluation of the Russian ruble, which impacted destinations like Phuket. However, following the end of martial law in April 2015, tourism began to rebound, with expectations of an increase in high-spending tourists from Europe and the US.

On August 17, 2015, a bomb exploded at the Erawan Shrine in Bangkok, killing 22 people and injuring 123, many of whom were foreign tourists. This bombing, occurring amid the instability following the 2014 military coup, intensified negative perceptions of Thailand as a safe travel destination. The incident, alongside ongoing violence in southern Thailand linked to separatist insurgents, further disrupted tourism, with bookings falling and a general decline in confidence in the country's security. Despite recovery efforts after previous disruptions such as the coup and street protests, the bombing demonstrated the vulnerability of Thailand’s tourism to domestic unrest.

In August 2016, a series of bombings in Hua Hin and Phuket killed four people and injured dozens, including tourists from Europe. While the bombings were suspected to be linked to local insurgents rather than international terrorism, they triggered heightened security measures and foreign travel advisories. These violent events, coupled with ongoing political tensions and police harassment against tourists, further eroded visitor confidence. As Thailand’s tourism sector relies heavily on foreign visitors, these incidents underscored the ongoing challenges facing the industry amid the broader political instability.

== Statistics ==
=== Foreign arrivals in Thailand ===
Country	2025	2024	2023	2022	2021	2020	2019	2018	2017	2016	2015	2014	2013	2012
Malaysia	4,520,856	4,952,078	4,626,422	1,948,549	5,511	619,623	4,265,574	4,020,526	3,494,488	3,494,890	3,418,855	2,613,418	3,041,097	2,554,397
China	4,473,992	6,733,162	3,521,095	273,567	13,043	1,251,498	10,997,338	10,535,241	9,806,260	8,757,646	7,936,795	4,636,298	4,637,335	2,786,860
India	2,487,319	2,129,149	1,628,542	997,913	6,544	263,659	1,996,842	1,598,346	1,415,197	1,194,508	1,069,422	932,603	1,050,889	1,013,308
Russia	1,898,837	1,745,327	1,482,611	435,008	30,759	590,151	1,483,337	1,472,789	1,346,338	1,090,083	884,136	1,606,430	1,746,565	1,316,564
South Korea	1,555,227	1,868,945	1,660,042	538,766	12,077	262,017	1,890,973	1,796,426	1,709,265	1,464,200	1,373,045	1,122,566	1,295,342	1,163,619
Japan	1,091,227	1,050,904	805,768	290,146	9,461	322,677	1,806,438	1,656,101	1,544,442	1,439,510	1,381,702	1,267,886	1,536,425	1,373,716
United Kingdom	1,083,162	965,862	817,220	444,432	38,663	223,087	992,574	986,854	994,755	1,004,345	947,568	907,877	905,024	873,053
United States	1,081,929	1,030,733	930,206	453,678	37,880	212,669	1,165,950	1,122,270	1,056,423	975,643	867,505	763,520	823,486	768,638
Taiwan	987,633	1,089,910	724,594	94,834	1,675	117,511	790,039	687,748	573,077	522,273	552,699	394,149	502,176	394,225
Singapore	967,341	1,009,640	1,027,424	614,627	5,931	126,771	1,059,484	1,069,867	1,032,647	967,550	938,385	844,133	955,468	831,215
Germany	965,898	873,364	729,163	365,030	45,874	231,782	852,481	886,523	850,139	837,885	761,819	715,240	73 7,658	682,419
Laos	868,368	1,124,202	919,401	502,124	733	380,207	1,854,792	1,664,630	1,682,087	1,388,020	1,220,522	1,053,983	976,639	975,999
France	816,935	720,806	545,003	268,587	23,461	237,317	745,346	749,556	740,190	738,878	681,114	635,073	611,582	576,106
Australia	808,682	775,010	687,745	336,688	9,577	123,827	767,291	801,203	817,218	796,370	807,450	831,854	900,460	930,241
Indonesia	787,524	876,610	762,118	235,632	2,577	99,530	710,494	644,709	576,110	534,797	469,125	497,592	594,251	447,820
Philippines	704,575	598,124	461,251	178,021	4,078	72,762	506,430	432,237	381,252	339,150	310,968	304,813	321,571	289,566
Myanmar	688,678	546,629	394,134	193,778	7,256	55,279	378,232	368,188	365,606	341,626	259,678	206,794	172,383	129,385
Vietnam	660,386	984,248	1,033,688	468,393	1,794	132,127	1,048,181	1,028,150	935,179	830,220	751,162	559,415	725,057	618,670
Hong Kong	643,158	876,076	802,368	162,240	1,657	124,518	1,045,361	1,015,749	821,064	751,264	669,617	483,131	588,335	473,666
Israel	410,125	281,803	217,084	146,293	14,038	29,444	195,856	188,788	173,673	161,579	141,031	138,778	134,874	129,551
Italy	311,852	267,474	191,983	85,254	5,322	60,602	272,374	279,905	264,524	265,597	246,094	219,875	207,192	200,703
Netherlands	284,343	261,467	229,539	116,354	8,539	52,402	241,608	236,265	222,409	235,762	221,619	211,524	218,765	208,122
Canada	263,954	251,336	214,264	90,608	6,440	58,499	273,214	276,094	258,494	244,869	227,601	211,059	229,897	219,354
Cambodia	253,557	553,060	583,708	379,665	4,914	165,027	910,696	948,824	840,871	674,975	537,950	550,339	481,595	423,642
Poland	237,570	180,722	121,700	49,469										
Sweden	236,833	212,523	178,259	97,378	17,094	111,994	287,341	311,949	323,736	332,895	321,690	324,865	341,398	364,681
Spain	216,249	207,710	153,458	87,400	3,514	25,904	188,997	181,880	179,584	168,900	150,995	116,983	123,084	113,141
Saudi Arabia	213,055	228,032	178,113	96,389	467	4,227	30,006	28,337	33,531	24,834	19,168	12,860	21,452	17,084
Switzerland	194,911	184,046	156,337	81,180	11,429	52,361	192,130	207,471	209,528	209,057	206,480	201,271	199,923	191,147
United Arab Emirates	172,979	169,927	138,934	65,857	4,061	7,492	130,158	128,270	137,218	130,941	124,719	117,907	123,926	113,547
Kazakhstan	166,620	195,089	172,489	59,468										
Denmark	148,337	138,278	115,224	64,249	8,480	66,848	162,456	169,373	161,920	165,581	159,435	160,977	163,186	167,499
Bangladesh	144,333	142,268	140,657	81,106	1,955	21,838	136,677	129,574	121,765	100,263	107,394	88,134	82,418	72,657
Turkey	127,525	92,116	69,108	27,128										
Norway	122,734	109,731	83,952	46,521	5,763	39,778	127,992	128,841	127,850	131,039	135,382	145,207	154,049	148,796
Belgium	122,347	108,046	85,512	48,684	5,386	26,394	114,669	114,270	112,266	111,013	106,090	99,729	101,109	94,896
Oman	119,577	103,317	86,488	35,204										
Austria	114,715	107,074	88,706	42,683	5,486	36,381	111,428	116,656	104,784	100,373	97,869	100,968	106,278	94,667
New Zealand	101,137	96,733	85,897	35,900	1,151	15,709	112,680	116,726	117,962	111,595	112,411	108,081	118,395	113,871
Sri Lanka	98,826	60,372	33,893	12,734	576	8,155								
Total	32,974,321	35,545,714	28,150,016	11,153,026	427,869	6,725,193	39,916,251	38,178,194	35,591,978	32,529,588	29,923,185	24,809,683	26,546,725	22,353,903

=== Past arrivals statistics ===
- Reference: statistics for the period 1998–2016, 2017–2018.

Year	Arrivals	% change
2025	32,974,321	▼7.23%
2024	35,545,714	▲26.27%
2023	28,042,131	▲151%
2022	11,153,026	▲1261%
2021	819,429	▼93.61%
2020	6,702,396	▼83.21%
2019	39,797,406	▲4.24%
2018	38,277,300	▲7.54%
2017	35,381,210	▲8.57%
2016	32,588,303	▲8.91%
2015	29,881,091	▲20.44%
2014	24,809,683	▼6.54%
2013	26,546,725	▲18.77%
2012	22,353,903	▲15.98%
2011	19,230,470	▲20.67%
2010	15,936,400	▲12.63%
2009	14,149,841	▼2.98%
2008	14,584,220	▲0.83%
2007	14,464,228	▲4.65%
2006	13,821,802	▲20.01%
2005	11,516,936	n/a

In their justifications for constructing a new coal-fired power plant in Krabi Province (2015), the Electricity Generating Authority of Thailand (EGAT) presumes that by 2032 Thailand will receive more than 100 million tourists a year, 40% of them visiting Phuket and neighbouring areas such as Krabi. On average, the power consumption of a tourist is four times higher than that of a local resident.

In 2015 some segments of Thailand's hospitality industry enjoyed their best year in over two decades, according to research firm STR Global. Thailand closed the year with an overall hotel occupancy of 73.4%, an increase of 13.6% over 2014, as arrivals rose to near the 30 million mark, driven by demand from the Chinese market. December 2015 was a particularly strong month as occupancy levels reached 77.4%, the highest level since 1995.

Despite the increasing number of tourist arrivals, some businesses catering to the tourist trade report declining numbers. Sompoch Sukkaew, chief legal counsel of the Patong Entertainment Business Association (PEBA) in Phuket, said in January 2016 that entertainment businesses are suffering. "Over the past three years, most bars were averaging about B90,000 revenue per day at this time of year,...now they're making just B40,000. Small bars...used to average B40,000 to B50,000 a day, now they're down to just B10,000 per day....PEBA members generated about B1.5 million per day during the peak season. Now it's down to about B540,000 per day." PEBA members number 500 in Patong, with about 200 businesses in the Bangla Road entertainment area. PEBA President Weerawit Kuresombat attributed the decline to the rise in Chinese tourism. "...most of them [Chinese tourists] come on complete tour packages....This means they spend very little on extras....They rarely venture out for the nightlife or even visit independent restaurants. They just don't spend much", he said.

The Thai government expects revenue from foreign tourists to increase by 8.5% to 1.78 trillion baht (US$49.8 billion) in 2017. Deputy Prime Minister Thanasak Patimaprakorn attributed the increase to the improving outlook for global tourism as well as Thailand's investments in infrastructure. In 2016, Thailand had 32.6 million visitors, a rise of nearly nine percent from 2015. In 2017 the number of tourists visiting Thailand exceeded 35 million. Thanasak expects daily tourist spending to increase to 5,200 baht per person in 2017, up from 5,100 baht in 2016. Local tourists are expected to contribute an additional 950 billion baht in tourism revenues in 2017.

According to the Ministry of Tourism and Sports (MOTS, Citation2021a) and the National Statistical Office of Thailand (Citation2016), the number of international tourists that visited Thailand climbed significantly from 9.51 million in 2000 to 39.92 million in 2019. Meanwhile, inbound tourism revenue climbed gradually from USD 9,500 million to USD 63,727 million, representing an almost 700% rise.

== Sex tourism ==
Since the Vietnam War, Thailand has gained an international reputation among travellers from many countries as a sex tourism destination.

Havocscope said that about US$6.4 billion in annual revenue was being generated by prostitution, a figure which accounted for 1.6 percent of Thailand's GDP.

Kobkarn Wattanavrangkul, named Thailand's first female tourism minister in 2014, has pledged to eradicate Thailand's sex industry. "We want Thailand to be about quality tourism. We want the sex industry gone," Ms Kobkarn told Reuters. "Tourists don't come to Thailand for sex. They come here for our beautiful culture." She has named Pattaya, with its thousands of bars, brothels, and massage parlours, her "pilot project" in the cleanup campaign. Kobkarn was replaced as tourism minister in November 2017.

On 21 February 2017, Prime Minister Gen Prayut Chan-o-cha announced that he will order the police to dismantle Pattaya's sex industry. "I don't support prostitution", said Prayut.

== Medical tourism ==
As of 2019, with 64 accredited hospitals, Thailand is currently among the top 10 medical tourism destinations in the world. In 2017, Thailand registered 3.3 million visits by foreigners seeking specialised medical treatment. In 2018, this number grew to 3.5 million. As of 2019 Thai medical centres are serving increasing numbers of Chinese medical tourists in tandem with increasing overall Chinese tourism. All numbers reported by the government must be viewed with some skepticism according to the authors of a 2010 study. The Thai government reported that in 2006, 1.2 million medical tourists were treated in Thailand. But the 2010 study of five private hospitals that serve more than 60% of foreign medical tourists concluded that there were 167,000 medical tourists in Thailand in 2010, far below the government estimate. Most came for minor elective (cosmetic) surgery.

== Gastronomical tourism ==
The governor of the Tourism Authority of Thailand (TAT), said the agency aims to increase income from the gastronomy business from 20% of total tourism income forecasted for 2017 to 25% in 2018. In 2017, TAT aims for 2.77 trillion baht in tourism revenue, 20% of which is projected to come from gastronomy. In 2018, tourism revenue is expected to climb to three trillion baht, with gastronomy accounting for 750 billion baht. Thailand's 103,000 street food vendors alone generated 270 billion baht in revenues in 2017. Suvit Maesincee, Minister of Higher Education, Science, Research and Innovation, expects the Thai street food segment to grow by six to seven percent annually.

TAT, in early-2017, approved a budget of 144 million baht to commission the Michelin Guide to rate restaurants in Thailand for the five-year period 2017–2021. The first guide, Michelin Guide to Bangkok, was released on 6 December 2017. It bestowed Michelin stars on 17 Bangkok restaurants, ten of which do not serve Thai food. Guides to other cities will follow.

In 2016, gastronomy was Thailand's fourth-largest tranche (20%) of tourism income, after accommodation (29%), transport (27%), and shopping and souvenirs (24%). TAT estimates that Chinese tourists spent 83.3 billion baht on food in Thailand in 2016, followed by Russians at 20.8 billion baht, Britons at 18.4 billion baht, Malaysians at 16.1 billion baht, and Americans at 13.9 billion baht.

== Elephant tourism ==
Elephant trekking has been an attraction for tourists in Thailand for decades. Ever since logging in Thailand was banned in 1989, elephants were brought into camps to put on shows for tourists and to give them rides. The majority of these elephants once used to work in the logging industry. After the government banned logging, many mahouts were then unable to care for their elephants and left them in the wild. After tourism in the country rose, elephants came back into demand. The tourism boom gave elephants a place to work and be cared for. Today there are an estimated 3,500 to 4,000 domesticated elephants in the country.

However, concerns were raised regarding their welfare. Elephants can sustain injuries related to giving rides, or going on treks, with tourists. The elephant's spine is curved and not optimised to carry heavy loads—the weight of two or more tourists at a time. The chairs or benches often used for the tourists to sit on upon it can also cause abrasions and chafing on its back, sides, and torso. During treks mahouts control the elephants with hooks and can use excessive force, resulting in puncture wounds. Common training practices include being chained, cut, stabbed, burned and hit to varying degrees. Inexperienced mahouts are more likely to further harm their elephants and beat them into submission. Hooks are the common tool used to discipline and guide an elephant during treks.

== Sport tourism ==
"Amazing Thailand" – Thailand Tourism booth at a Travel and Tour Expo

Muay Thai is the national sport of Thailand, and a trip to a stadium to witness the 'science of the eight limbs' is an essential experience for many tourists. Studying Muay Thai is a main activity for Thai sport tourism, which the government promotes.

In 2016, there were 11,219 British people, 6,800 Australians, and 5,852 French nationals who visited Thailand to take lessons in the classical martial art. Thirty-eight percent of all people signing up for Muay Thai classes chose Phuket as their study destination, 28% chose Bangkok, and 16% chose Surat Thani.

== Tourism Authority of Thailand ==
The Tourism Authority of Thailand (TAT) has been actively leading the country's sustainable tourism efforts, focusing on innovation, sustainability, and digital transformation. At ITB Berlin 2025, TAT showcased its Carbon Neutral and Net Zero Tourism projects in partnership with the Ministry of Higher Education and the Thailand Science Research and Innovation Promotion Fund. These initiatives, spanning all 77 provinces, aim to reduce the tourism sector’s carbon footprint and promote eco-friendly travel. TAT also integrates Thailand’s Soft Power, including gastronomy and cultural heritage, to enhance both sustainability and economic value. In recognition of these efforts, Nan Old Town and Chiang Khan received awards for sustainable tourism at ITB Berlin 2025. Following the event, TAT plans to expand its initiatives globally as part of Thailand's "Amazing Thailand Grand Tourism & Sports Year 2025" vision, which seeks to further boost international tourism and support sustainable practices across the sector.

TAT has also forged international partnerships to promote sustainable tourism globally. In March 2024, TAT collaborated with U.S.-based non-profit Tourism Cares, launching the “Tourism Cares Meaningful Travel FAM with Thailand,” which introduced 14 tourism representatives to Thailand’s sustainable practices in Bangkok and Krabi. This initiative aims to expand U.S. awareness of Thailand’s sustainable tourism, including the Tourism Cares Meaningful Travel Map of Thailand, which highlights eco-friendly organizations. The partnership follows Thailand’s post-COVID tourism recovery, which saw a 112% increase in U.S. visitors in 2023. Additionally, TAT partnered with dnata Travel Group in May 2024 to promote niche tourism markets in Gulf Cooperation Council (GCC) countries, including luxury and wellness tourism. This collaboration focuses on attracting high-value tourists and promoting Thailand as a "Quality Leisure Destination."

== See also ==
- List of World Heritage Sites in Thailand
- Visa policy of Thailand
- Tourism in Bangkok
- Markets in Bangkok
- Responsible Tourism in Thailand
- List of shopping malls in Thailand
- List of Thai dishes
- Banana Pancake Trail
- MICE in Thailand
