= Anan Phonimdaeng =

- อนันต์ โพธิ์นิ่มแดง

Governor of the State Railway of Thailand
- Acting
- Assumed office 2025
- Preceded by: Veeris Ammarapala

Anan Phonimdaeng (Thai: อนันต์ โพธิ์นิ่มแดง) is a Thai civil servant serving as Acting Governor of the State Railway of Thailand (SRT) since 2025.

== Career ==
Anan succeeded Veeris Ammarapala, who resigned in October 2025.

=== 2026 Sikhio train disaster ===
Anan is overseeing the response to the 2026 Sikhio train disaster, and was ordered by Minister of Transport Phipat Ratchakitprakarn to "thoroughly and comprehensively" investigate the cause of the crash.
