= Thailand Convention and Exhibition Bureau =

Thai public organization

- สำนักงานส่งเสริมการจัดการประชุมและนิทรรศการ
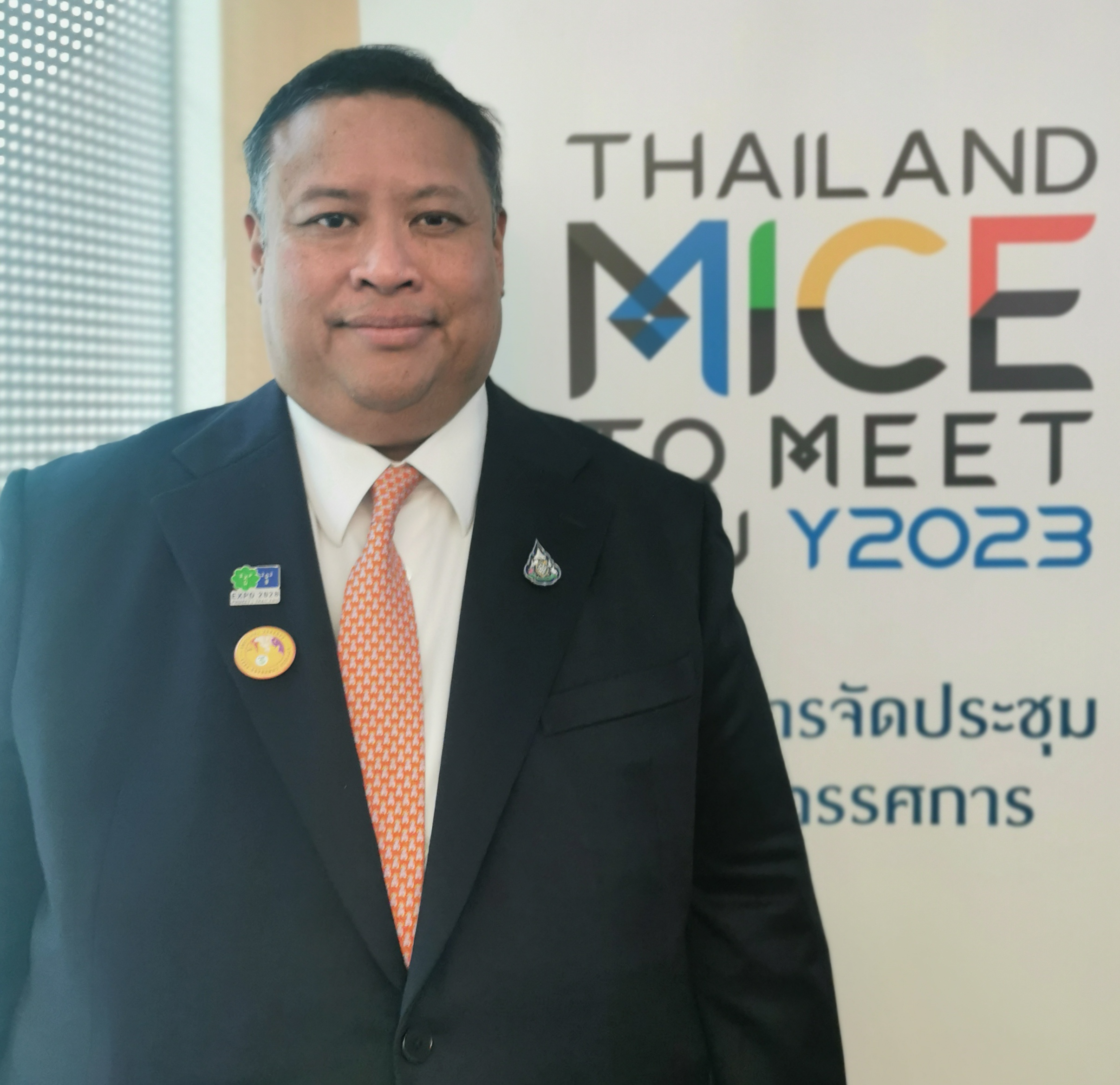
- Chiruit Isarangkun Na Ayuthaya at IMEX 2023

Agency overview
- Formed: 27 September 2002; 23 years ago
- Headquarters: Bangkok
- Employees: 143
- Annual budget: 895 million baht (FY2019)
- Agency executive: Chiruit Isarangkun Na Ayuthaya, President
- Parent department: Office of the Prime Minister
- Website: Official website

The Thailand Convention and Exhibition Bureau (TCEB; Thai: สำนักงานส่งเสริมการจัดการประชุมและนิทรรศการ) is a public organization established by royal decree in 2002 to promote Thailand as a destination for meetings, incentives, conferencing, exhibitions (MICE).

== History ==
The establishment of the organization was announced on 27 September 2002. It became operational in 2004. Thailand's MICE revenues in 2004 amounted to 31.7 million baht.

The Royal Thai Government established TCEB under the Office of the Prime Minister to be the organization responsible for stimulating MICE in Thailand. One of the bureau's roles is to encourage the inclusion of Thai arts and culture in these events in order to promote the national heritage.

Chiruit Isarangkun Na Ayuthaya began a four-year term as president of TCEB on 15 May 2017. He is keen on spreading MICE business to areas beyond Bangkok, especially four target cities: Chiang Mai, Khon Kaen, Pattaya, and Phuket.

== Services and campaigns ==
The organization acts as a promoter and a source of advisory services. It is involved in:

- Meetings and incentives services: The Meetings and Incentives Department serves as a one-stop source of information, advice, and recommendations on the promotion of international corporate meetings and incentive travel in Thailand.
- Convention services: Assists international associations organize conventions in Thailand.
- Exhibition services: Help in establishing exhibitions

In 2011, TCEB launched a campaign entitled "The Next Best Shows". The campaign sought to raise the number of visitors and revenue before it was scheduled end in 2014.

In 2013, TCEB launched the "Thailand CONNECT" campaign. The campaign will enhance the global visibility of the Thailand brand as part of the five-year master plan (2012-2016) and its three key strategies: win, promote, and develop.

In 2014, TCEB adopted social media campaigns.

== Performance and budget ==
TCEB claims that in 2018 almost 200,000 visitors met with 35,000 exhibitors on a combined show floor of more than 640,000 m^{2} (net space sold), generating revenue of 10 billion baht (US$602 million). In the first quarter of 2019, exhibition visitors to Thailand grew by 61 percent, from 21,845 to 43,100, while revenues climbed 45 percent year-over-year, from 2,223 to 3,214 million baht.

TCEB's budget for fiscal year 2019 (FY2019) is 895 million baht, down from 958.5 million in FY2018 and 992.3 million baht in FY2017. MICE revenues in 2017 were 104 billion baht. The 2018 target is 124 billion baht.
