= 2014 Thailand National Games =

XLIII Thailand National Games
- Host city: Nakhon Ratchasima
- Motto: สร้างมิตรไมตรี สร้างสามัคคี ด้วยกีฬา Games for Friendship and Unity
- Teams: 77
- Events: 43 sports
- Opening: 9 December 2014
- Closing: 19 December 2014
- Opened by: Kobkarn Wattanavrangkul, Minister of Tourism and Sports
- Torch lighter: Udomporn Polsak
- Main venue: 80th Birthday Stadium

The 43rd Thailand National Games (Thai: การแข่งขันกีฬาแห่งชาติ ครั้งที่ 43 "นครราชสีมาเกมส์", also known as the 2014 National Games and the Nakhon Ratchasima Games) were held in Nakhon Ratchasima, Thailand from 9 to 19 December 2014. Competition included 43 sports and 77 disciplines. These games held in the 80th Birthday Sport Center, Suranaree University of Technology Sport Center. Nakhon Ratchasima also hosted the 2007 Southeast Asian Games.

== Marketing ==
=== Emblem ===
Symbols in the games' emblem had the following meanings.

- The shape of the torch represented the national competition this time.
- Style represented the spirit of sportsmanship.
- The pattern of clay Dankwian, the Suranaree, and the Phimaiwas were for the culture of Thailand.
- Striped silk represented the wisdom of Nakhon Ratchasima.

=== Mascot ===
The mascots Sima Gomphotherium is an ancient animal fossils were discovered in Chaloem Phra Kiat District, Nakhon Ratchasima. The mascots carry the torch, wear orange T-shirt. "Orange" is the color of the province and hanging a gold medal.

== Ceremony ==
=== Opening ceremony ===
The official opening ceremony of this games were 9 December 2014 at the 80th Birthday Stadium in Nakhon Ratchasima. It was attended by the Minister of Tourism and Sports, Kobkarn Wattanavrangkul. This ceremony presented 7 series including

- The first series: One melodie open the great legend.
- The second series: One victory One sportsmanship. (Athletes parade)
- The third series: One royal heart to One faith of the land.
- The fourth series: One great city One Korat citizen heart.
- The fifth series: The potential improve Korat to global.
- The sixth series: The unity to blazing in the land. (lighting the cauldron)
- The seventh series: One the great of power to the great city

=== Closing ceremony ===
The official closing ceremony was 19 December 2014 at the 80th Birthday Stadium December 5, 2007 in Nakhon Ratchasima. In the closing ceremony were shown 6 series and closing by Kobkarn Wattanavrangkul, Minister of Tourism and Sports.

== Provinces participating ==
- Amnat Charoen
- Ang Thong
- Bangkok
- Bueng Kan
- Buriram
- Chachoengsao
- Chai Nat
- Chaiyaphum
- Chanthaburi
- Chiang Mai
- Chiang Rai
- Chonburi
- Chumphon
- Kalasin
- Kamphaeng
- Kanchanaburi
- Khon Kaen
- Krabi
- Lampang
- Lamphun
- Loei
- Lopburi
- Mae Hong Son
- Maha Sarakham
- Mukdahan
- Nakhon Nayok
- Nakhon Pathom
- Nakhon Phanom
- Nakhon Ratchasima
- Nakhon Sawan
- Nakhon Si Thammarat
- Nan
- Narathiwat
- Nong Bua Lamphu
- Nong Khai
- Nonthaburi
- Pathum Thani
- Pattani
- Phang Nga
- Phatthalung
- Phayao
- Phetchabun
- Phetchaburi
- Phichit
- Phitsanulok
- Phra Nakhon Si Ayutthaya
- Phrae
- Phuket
- Prachinburi
- Prachuap Khiri Khan
- Ranong
- Ratchaburi
- Rayong
- Roi Et
- Sa Kaeo
- Sakon Nakhon
- Samut Prakan
- Samut Sakhon
- Samut Songkhram
- Saraburi
- Satun
- Singburi
- Sisaket
- Songkhla
- Sukhothai
- Suphan Buri
- Surat Thani
- Surin
- Tak
- Trang
- Trat
- Ubon Ratchathani
- Udon Thani
- Uthai Thani
- Uttaradit
- Yala
- Yasothon

== Sports ==
=== Official sports ===
- Air sports
- Archery
- Athletics
- Badminton
- Basketball
- Billiards and snooker
- Bodybuilding
- Bowling
- Bridge
- Boxing
- Cricket
- Cycling
- Dancesport
- Extreme sports
- Equestrian
- Fencing
- Field hockey
- Football
- Gymnastics
- Go
- Golf
- Handball
- Judo
- Kabaddi
- Karate
- Muay Thai
- Petanque
- Pencaksilat
- Rugby football
- Sepak takraw
- Shooting
- Softball
- Swimming
- Table tennis
- Taekwondo
- Tennis
- Volleyball
- Weightlifting
- Woodball
- Wrestling
- Wushu

=== Demonstration sports ===
- Makruk
- Practical shooting

== Venues ==
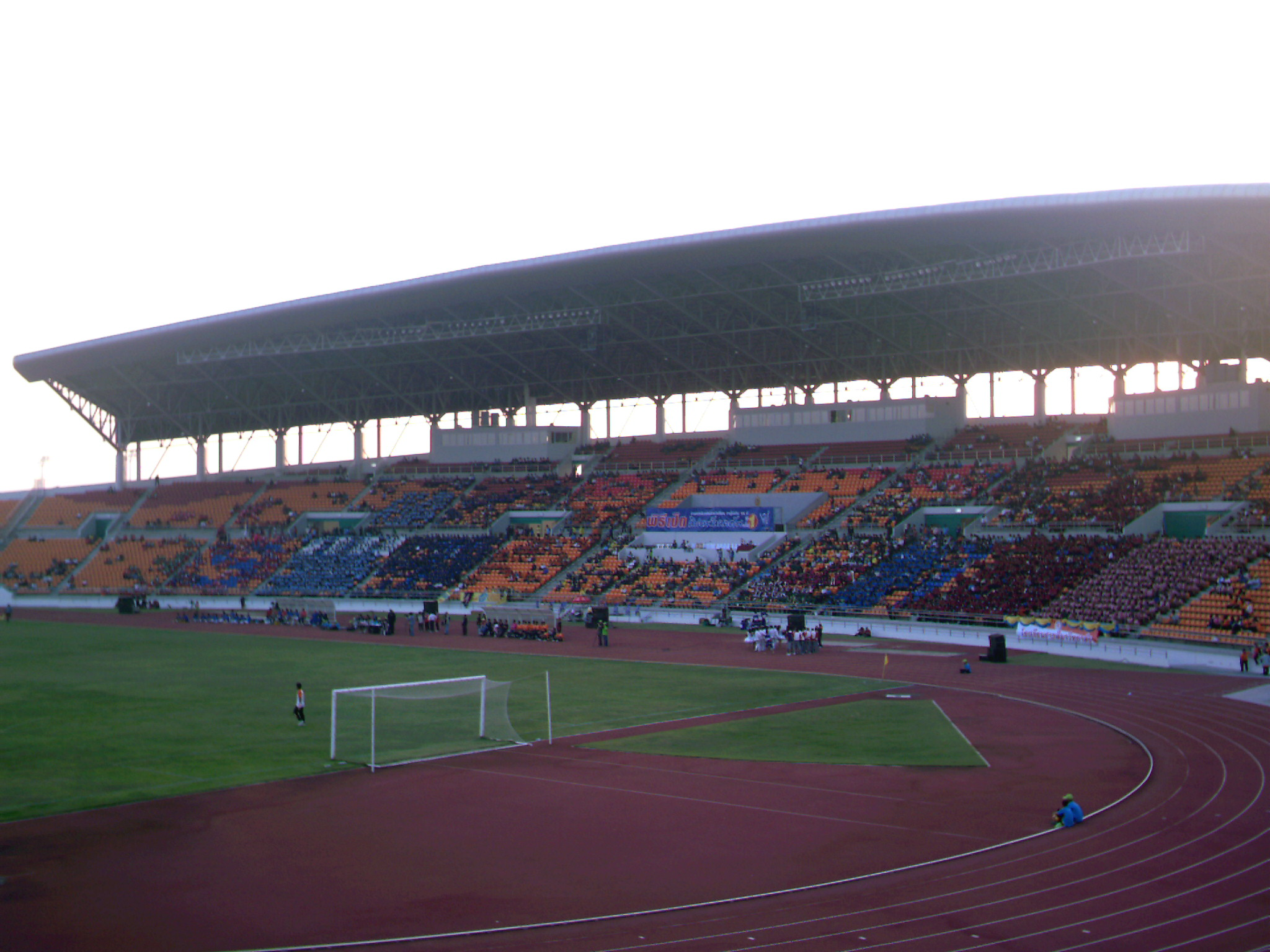
Aerial view of the 80th Birthday Stadium
- 80th Birthday Stadium (Main Stadium)
- Nakhon Ratchasima Municipality Stadium
- Camp Suranaree Stadium
- Suranaree University of Technology
- Nakhon Ratchasima Rajabhat University
- Nakhon Ratchasima Rajabhat University
- Vongchavalitkul University
- Rajsima Wittayalai School
- Thesaban 4 School
- Yothinnukun School
- Aerial and aviation Stadium, Mueang Mai Kokkruat
- The Mall Nakhonratchasima
- Klang Plaza Chomsurang
- Mittraphap Road (Nakhon Ratchasima - Sikhio)
- North Star Equestrian Centre
- Mountain Creek Golf Resort and Residences
- Huaiyang Reservoir
- Khao Noen Makha
- Practical Shooting Stadium, Sports Authority of Thailand Region 3

== Medal tally ==
Suphan Buri led the medal table for the second consecutive time. A total of 77 Provinces won at least one medal, 65 Provinces won at least one gold medal, 11 Provinces won at least one silver medal and 1 Province won at least one bronze medal. The host province, Nakhon Ratchansima, is highlighted.

* Host nation (Nakhon Ratchasima)

2014 Thailand National Games medal table
| Rank | Province | Gold | Silver | Bronze | Total |
|---|---|---|---|---|---|
| 1 | Suphan Buri | 121 | 68 | 81 | 270 |
| 2 | Bangkok | 87 | 107 | 107 | 301 |
| 3 | Nakhon Ratchasima* | 63 | 34 | 57 | 154 |
| 4 | Chonburi | 43 | 51 | 46 | 140 |
| 5 | Nonthaburi | 38 | 25 | 23 | 86 |
| 6 | Chiang Mai province | 18 | 25 | 33 | 76 |
| 7 | Samut Sakhon | 18 | 12 | 22 | 52 |
| 8 | Samut Prakan | 15 | 13 | 24 | 52 |
| 9 | Surin | 13 | 10 | 13 | 36 |
| 10 | Saraburi | 12 | 9 | 10 | 31 |
| 11 | Udon Thani | 12 | 8 | 15 | 35 |
| 12 | Chumphon | 11 | 7 | 12 | 30 |
| 13 | Trang | 9 | 13 | 10 | 32 |
| 14 | Amnat Charoen | 9 | 3 | 11 | 23 |
| 15 | Sisaket | 8 | 11 | 27 | 46 |
| 16 | Phitsanulok | 8 | 8 | 8 | 24 |
| 17 | Buriram province | 8 | 7 | 8 | 23 |
| 18 | Phatthalung | 8 | 3 | 6 | 17 |
| 19 | Nakhon Si Thammarat | 7 | 12 | 27 | 46 |
| 20 | Surat Thani | 7 | 12 | 18 | 37 |
| 21 | Ubon Ratchathani | 7 | 10 | 16 | 33 |
| 22 | Phuket | 7 | 7 | 10 | 24 |
| 23 | Phetchabun | 7 | 7 | 9 | 23 |
| 24 | Nakhon Pathom | 6 | 7 | 13 | 26 |
| 25 | Prachuap Khiri Khan | 6 | 5 | 6 | 17 |
| 26 | Ratchaburi | 5 | 8 | 10 | 23 |
| 27 | Maha Sarakham | 5 | 7 | 8 | 20 |
| 28 | Satun | 5 | 3 | 4 | 12 |
| 29 | Mae Hong Son | 5 | 2 | 7 | 14 |
| 30 | Khon Kaen | 4 | 15 | 14 | 33 |
| 31 | Chanthaburi province | 4 | 8 | 16 | 28 |
| 32 | Pathum Thani | 4 | 6 | 8 | 18 |
| 33 | Pattani | 4 | 6 | 5 | 15 |
| 34 | Chiang Rai province | 4 | 5 | 6 | 15 |
| 35 | Phayao | 4 | 5 | 2 | 11 |
| 36 | Sakon Nakhon | 4 | 4 | 3 | 11 |
| 37 | Sukhothai | 4 | 2 | 11 | 17 |
| 38 | Kalasin | 4 | 1 | 4 | 9 |
| 39 | Songkhla | 3 | 5 | 12 | 20 |
| 40 | Lamphun | 3 | 5 | 6 | 14 |
| 41 | Rayong | 3 | 3 | 18 | 24 |
| 42 | Ranong | 3 | 2 | 3 | 8 |
| 43 | Phra Nakhon Si Ayutthaya | 3 | 0 | 4 | 7 |
| 44 | Samut Songkhram | 3 | 0 | 0 | 3 |
| 45 | Trat | 2 | 6 | 6 | 14 |
| 46 | Kanchanaburi | 2 | 5 | 6 | 13 |
| 47 | Yala | 2 | 4 | 8 | 14 |
| 48 | Lopburi | 2 | 3 | 5 | 10 |
| 49 | Phang Nga | 2 | 3 | 4 | 9 |
| 50 | Chachoengsao | 2 | 2 | 11 | 15 |
| 51 | Phichit | 2 | 2 | 5 | 9 |
| 51 | Phrae | 2 | 2 | 5 | 9 |
| 53 | Mukdahan | 2 | 2 | 0 | 4 |
| 54 | Roi Et | 2 | 1 | 8 | 11 |
| 55 | Nakhon Sawan | 1 | 10 | 5 | 16 |
| 56 | Krabi | 1 | 6 | 7 | 14 |
| 57 | Chaiyaphum province | 1 | 5 | 10 | 16 |
| 58 | Nakhon Nayok | 1 | 2 | 3 | 6 |
| 59 | Nan | 1 | 1 | 6 | 8 |
| 59 | Sa Kaeo | 1 | 1 | 6 | 8 |
| 61 | Narathiwat | 1 | 1 | 3 | 5 |
| 62 | Kamphaeng Phet | 1 | 1 | 1 | 3 |
| 62 | Tak | 1 | 1 | 1 | 3 |
| 64 | Nakhon Phanom | 1 | 0 | 4 | 5 |
| 64 | Yasothon | 1 | 0 | 4 | 5 |
| 66 | Lampang | 0 | 8 | 3 | 11 |
| 67 | Ang Thong | 0 | 8 | 2 | 10 |
| 68 | Chai Nat province | 0 | 4 | 6 | 10 |
| 69 | Sing Buri | 0 | 3 | 2 | 5 |
| 70 | Nong Bua Lamphu | 0 | 3 | 0 | 3 |
| 71 | Phetchaburi | 0 | 2 | 6 | 8 |
| 72 | Bueng Kan | 0 | 2 | 4 | 6 |
| 73 | Prachinburi | 0 | 2 | 3 | 5 |
| 74 | Uttaradit | 0 | 1 | 3 | 4 |
| 75 | Loei | 0 | 1 | 2 | 3 |
| 75 | Nong Khai | 0 | 1 | 2 | 3 |
| 77 | Uthai Thani | 0 | 0 | 1 | 1 |
| Totals (77 entries) | | 653 | 654 | 895 | 2,202 |

| Preceded by (Suphan Buri province) Suphan Buri | Thailand National Games; Nakhon Ratchasima; XLIII Edition (2014) | Succeeded by (Nakhon Sawan province) Nakhon Sawan |
