= MICE in Thailand =

Industry in Thailand

The meetings, incentives, conferencing, exhibitions (MICE) industry in Thailand is one of the major branches of tourism in Thailand, contributing an estimated 0.58 percent to Thailand's GDP in 2012 (9.4% of all tourism earnings).

== Overview ==
The number of tourists in the MICE sector is around three percent of the overall arrivals to Thailand each year. They are recognized as the most desirable category of visitors, mainly because of their high-spending potential. The average spending of tourists in this sector is three times higher than spending of tourists in other sectors. Thailand benefits from its geographic position between China and India and tops the ASEAN region in terms of exhibition spaces sold and for being the most profitable MICE market.

In 2012, Thailand hosted more than 7,300 meeting events (a 6.84 percent increase from 2011), totaling 895,000 visitors. The main sources were conventions (33 percent), corporate meetings (25 percent) and incentive travel (24 percent), adding the equivalent of more than US$2.5 billion to the economy of Thailand. Around 65 percent of Thailand's MICE business came from Asian countries. India was the most frequent MICE customer, with 74,941 meetings visitors in 2012, followed by China (63,955), Japan (45,424) and Korea (37,175). The United States was on the eighth place, sending 21,786 delegates in 2012.

In 2013, the number of visitors surpassed one million, 72 percent from Asia. China was the main contributor, both by number of travelers (128,437) and revenue (US$360 million).

In 2018, the number of MICE visitors in Thailand peaked at two million, dropping sharply the following year due to the COVID-19 pandemic but still staying above the levels from 2016 (1.27 million visitors).

As of 2022, Thailand's MICE industry has shown remarkable resilience and growth. The Thailand Convention and Exhibition Bureau (TCEB) reported over 100,000 MICE gatherings in the year, with significant contributions from international groups. The largest MICE event in 2022 attracted 10,000 people from 50 countries, demonstrating the sector's broad international appeal.

Thailand is a popular destination for Indian weddings that use MICE facilities as reception venues, some wedding groups surpassing 1500 guests. Reasons given for this success have been the incorporation of the Indian culture and the understanding of the Indian guests' requirements, the price–performance ratio compared to India proper and also the visa on arrival regime for Indian citizens. In July 2014, 40 percent of Indian weddings held in Thailand were in Phuket, 30 percent in Hua Hin and 15 percent in Pattaya.

During the recent years Thailand has also grown into a popular destination for Western-style weddings, with the cost of a 100 guests wedding reaching an average of ~550,00฿ in 2023, and the number of reservations steadily growing.

Large scale events, such as conferences and conventions, can have a significant environmental impact in terms of energy usage, water consumption, waste, and carbon emissions. Thus, the Thailand Convention and Exhibition Bureau (TCEB) launched the "Green Meetings" campaign in 2009. However, the understanding of many event planners and industry players regarding environmentally sustainable events and meetings remains lacking.

== History ==
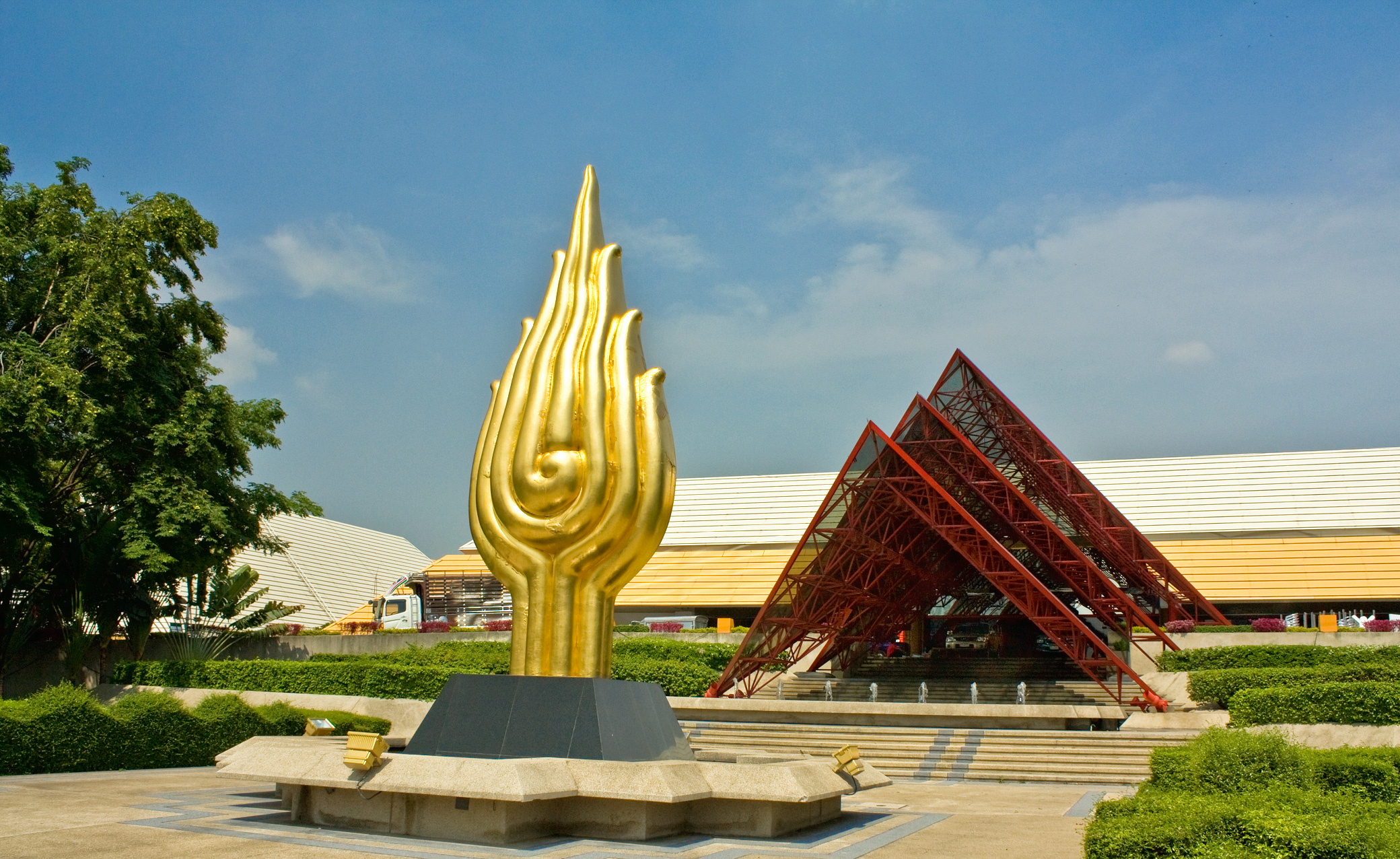
Queen Sirikit National Convention Center

In most Asia/Pacific countries (including Thailand), governments lead the way in the construction of MICE facilities. The private sector is generally leads the development of conference and exhibition centres in countries where governments have few financial resources (Indonesia and Mekong sub-region). In Thailand, in 1984, the government and private sectors jointly established the "Thailand Incentive and Convention Association" (TICA), in order to support the growth of the MICE sector. It cooperated with 'Trade Exhibition Association Thailand' (TEA) and some medical associations to draw meetings and seminars to be held in Thailand. These associations had some help from the government, but the government had not yet seen MICE as an opportunity. In 1991, the Queen Sirikit National Convention Center, one of the main convention centers in East Asia, opened.

In 2002, the Royal Thai Government established the Thailand Convention and Exhibition Bureau (TCEB) under the Office of the Prime Minister, as the organization to market MICE events in Thailand. One of the bureau's roles is to encourage the inclusion of Thai arts and culture in these events in order to promote the national heritage. TCEB identified five major MICE cities: (Bangkok, Phuket, Khon Kaen, Pattaya, Chiang Mai). Other organizations involved in the development of the MICE sector in Thailand are Tourism Authority of Thailand (TAT) and Thai Airways.

== Destinations ==
=== Bangkok ===
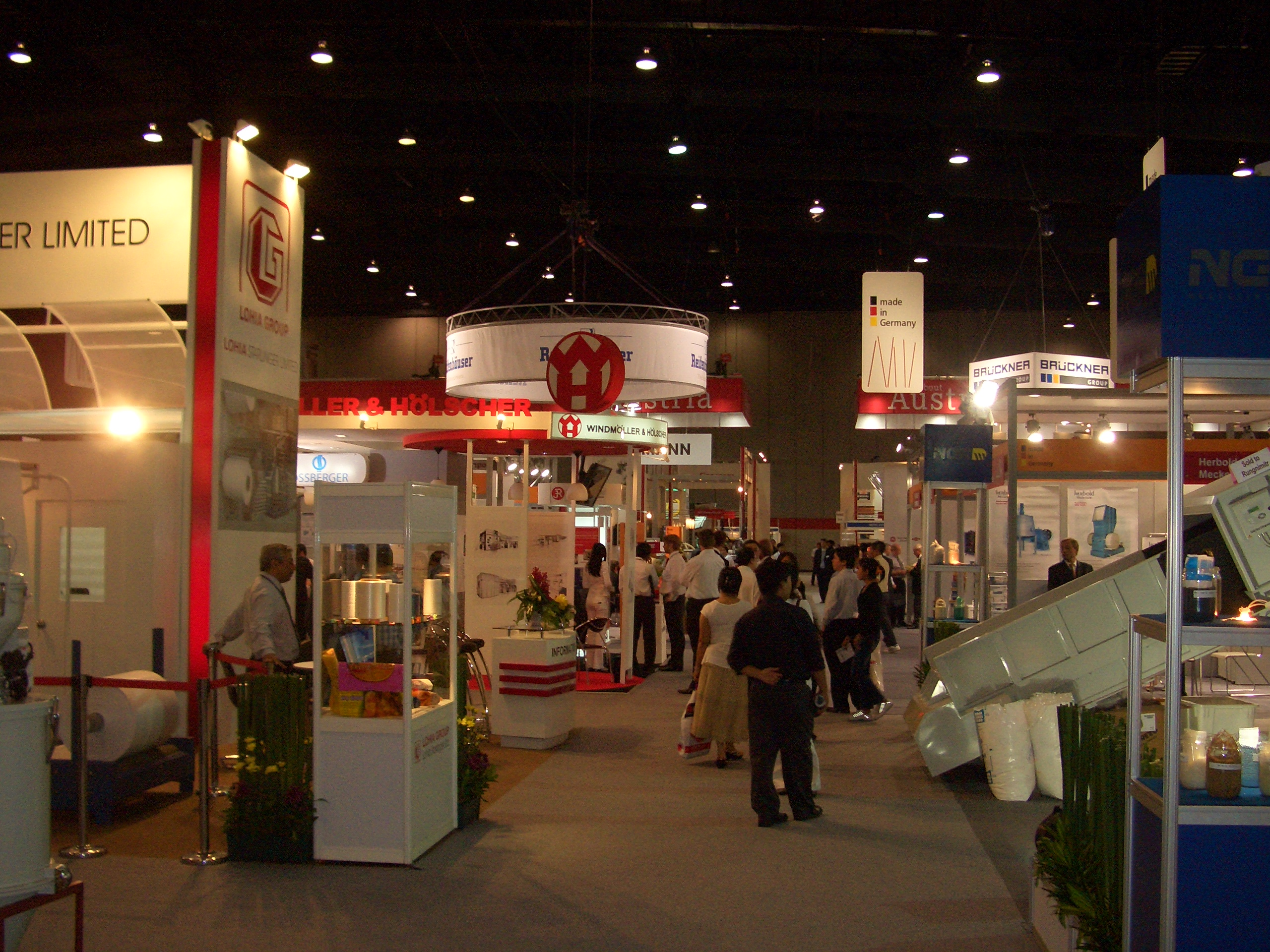
2006 TIPREX at BITEC

Bangkok is the administrative, education, commercial and transport center of the country, and a regional center for business, finance and communications, many international corporations having offices here. The city is the hub of Thailand's commercial events industry, with 299 hotels in the city center and seven world-standard convention and exhibition centers. Bangkok International Trade and Exhibition Centre (BITEC) focuses on machinery and trade shows. IMPACT, with a 130,000 m^{2} exhibition area and a convention center with a 10,000 delegates hosting capacity, mostly takes on consumer shows. Smaller venues such as the Royal Paragon Hall and Queen Sirikit National Convention Center usually host lifestyle events.

=== Chiang Mai ===
Working together with the TCEB, Chiang Mai devised a five-year master plan (2013–2017) to become a MICE hub. The Chiang Mai International Exhibition and Convention Centre (CMECC), with a total area of 521,600 m^{2} and usable space of 60,000 m^{2}, is one of the biggest convention and exhibition centres in Southeast Asia. In 2012, the total value of the Chiang Mai MICE industry reached 3.9 billion baht, of which 3.8 billion baht was contributed by 46,826 foreign MICE travellers.

In 2016, Chiang Mai was ranked 28th among Asia-Pacific and Middle East cities based on the number of meetings that took place, rising from its rank of 34th in 2015.

=== Khon Kaen ===
Khon Kaen is the major commercial and educational center of Isan, Thailand's northeastern region. It is one of the winners of IBM's Smarter Cities programme for developing MICE promoting strategies. In 2013, the MICE sector generated 600 million baht in revenue.

=== Pattaya ===
In the mid-1980s, Pattaya became the first Thai resort destination to attract international incentives, mainly from Europe. By the year 2000, Pattaya Exhibition and Convention Hall (PEACH), the largest local convention centre, secured its position as a venue for major conventions and exhibitions. It has been the venue for numerous large-scale conventions, including the PATA Travel Mart, PATA annual conference and ASEAN Tourism Forum as well as major medical and insurance related congresses. North Pattaya Alliance is a group of seven hotels focused on different identities and features that work together in hosting MICE events and Indian weddings.

=== Phuket ===
The extended touristic infrastructure in Phuket (over 600 hotels, various venues and an international airport) led to the development of a MICE sector on this island. Most of the venues with MICE facilities are in Laguna Phuket.

=== Koh Samui ===
Koh Samui is rapidly becoming a top destination for MICE events.

=== Phitsanulok ===
Phitsanulok Province Certified to "Become a MICE City" from 3 December 2020 onwards through the cooperation of the government, private sector, civil society Educational institution And all development partners MICE City Assessment Committee Has conducted an audit in Phitsanulok Province according to the criteria And has approved for Phitsanulok Province "Passed and MICE City assessment" effective 3 December 2020
