= Responsible tourism in Thailand =

Responsible tourism is a relatively modern concept in the Kingdom of Thailand that took root in the late 1990s. It is underpinned by the belief that tourism should develop in a manner that minimizes negative impacts on local communities, and wherever possible ensure that a positive symbiosis exists between hosts and visitors. Responsible travel promotes a respect for indigenous culture, the minimization of the negative environmental impacts of tourism, active participation in volunteering to assist local communities, and the structuring of businesses to benefit the final service provider rather than an international agent.

== Background ==
Inbound tourism to Thailand developed exponentially over the last four decades into a mainstay of the Thai economy. For several decades, tourism was one of the top three foreign exchange earnings for the country. By 2015, the industry accounted for 10 percent of Thailand's GDP with almost 30 million tourist arrivals. This, however, came with a heavy cost. Every tourist destination around Thailand started manifesting environmental degradation, which includes the production of wastewater, solid waste, and other pollutants. As a fast-growing industry, tourism also attracts investments that lead to expansion and construction of facilities that contribute to the generation of carbon dioxide as well as inefficient use of energy and resources. The World Bank's Travel and Tourism Competitiveness Report for 2015 ranked Thailand 116th out of 141 countries in terms of environmental sustainability. These developments are driving the emergence of environmental sustainability initiatives in the Thai tourism industry. This is phrased as responsible tourism, which approaches sustainability through a set of experiments that seek to spread the benefits of tourism while practicing tourism development in a more environmentally sustainable manner.

The tourism industry in Thailand today is diverse, offering a broad spectrum of services and accommodation across the kingdom, ranging from grass-thatched bungalows to luxury hotels that are recognized as global leaders in the hospitality field. The tendency to support and promote responsible tourism in the nation was aligned with the development of environmental concern over the ravages caused by tourism both within Thailand and abroad. The government is also leading the push for responsible tourism as part of its seven greens of tourism campaigns. However, COVID-19 has severely impacted industries and individual lives globally. Due to travel restrictions and social distancing to reduce the spread of the disease, it has seriously affected

the travel and tourism industry in Thailand, especially its community-based tourism. The impact of travel bans has magnified employment and income loss to most local families and their communities, negatively impacting the development of local tourism economies.

== Promotion of responsible tourism in Thailand ==
In July 2009, the German ambassador to Thailand, Hanns Schumacher, noted that, "Investment in eco-friendly tourism is the only way to create sustainable income in tourism. In some cases,...ecological destruction could cost much more to repair than the investment to prevent it." His comments reflected the impressions of many visitors to the country who observe a lack of proper waste management, poorly managed water supply and sanitation, and construction that damages the environment.

The tourism sector in Thailand was designated as a flagship programme of the Greater Mekong Subregion's Economic Cooperation Program, noting that it could improve socio-economic development and conservation of the kingdom's natural and cultural heritage. This strategy was devised with assistance from the Asian Development Bank. Specifically, the objectives of the strategy are to "add to the tourism development efforts of each country, by fostering a sustainable tourism development approach, by contributing to poverty reduction, gender equality and empowerment of women, while minimizing any adverse impacts".

=== Agritourism ===
Thailand has 1,215 agritourism sites nationwide. About two million Thai and foreign tourists are expected to travel to agritourism sites in 2016, with Thai tourists likely to spend about 1.86 billion baht and foreign tourists about 12 billion baht. Domestic agritourism, a business in which farmers open their properties to visitors, is projected to generate over 370 million baht for farmers over the mid-July 2016 five-day break alone. Some 500,000 foreign and Thai tourists are expected to visit farmers engaging in crop and livestock farming during the holiday. The Ministry of Agriculture and Cooperatives and the Ministry of Tourism and Sports have promoted domestic agritourism in line with the government's policy to stimulate domestic tourism.

== Responsible tourism and the Thai sufficiency economy ==
The fundamental factors of responsible, or sustainable, tourism in Thailand are thought to reflect King Bhumibol Adulyadej's concept of a "sufficiency economy".

An example of a successful sufficiency economy application in Thailand tourism is found in the Ban Mae Kampong Village. In 2000, the village started to offer home-stay services to allow tourists to experience the lifestyle of local people and explore surrounding countryside to appreciate natural beauty. It was named a One Tambon One Product (OTOP) Village Champion in 2004.

== Responsible tourism in Thailand ==
There is no formal governmental body in Thailand responsible specifically for sustainable tourism. There are private organisations that coordinate eco-friendly tourism:

=== Thai Ecotourism and Adventure Travel Association (TEATA) ===
The Thai Ecotourism and Adventure Travel Association (TEATA) was set up in 1997 with the aim to share experience-based knowledge and expertise, ensure the sustainability of responsible tourism, and promote meaningful experiences for Thailand's guests. TEATA works with ecotour operators who are members of TEATA with ecotourism activities in their tours. The public can use TEATA as a database to search for tour operators with ecotourism activities.

=== Community Based Tourism Network Coordination Centre ===
The Community Based Tourism (CBT) Network Coordination Centre provides a database of CBT communities, programs and services. It aims to link up tour operators or tourists to local communities for CBT programs. One example of such program is living with the locals to learn about their way of life and another example is the give back to the local community by volunteering. Presently, however, the CBT programs face questions of viability due to local constraints as well as the challenges that comes from the state such as the complex bureaucratic procedures and the lack of financial capital.

== Community based tourism standards in Thailand ==
2006: The CHARM-REST Project

The first CBT standard in Thailand was developed in 2006, as part of the EU funded Coastal Habitats and Resources Management Project (CHARM)8 in partnership with the Responsible Ecological Social Tours Project (REST), or the CHARM-REST project. An outcome of this project was a ‘self-monitoring and evaluation’ toolkit, based around a simple CBT Standard, with the aim of monitoring progress towards the community's objectives for CBT.

2009: Corporate Social Responsibility Market Access Partnerships

In 2009, the CBT Standard was further developed under the Corporate Social Responsibility and Market Access Partnerships Project for Sustainable Tourism Supply Chains (CSR-MAP), a partnership led by the Thai Ecotourism and Adventure Travel Association (TEATA), with the Greenleaf Foundation, CBT-I and the European Centre for Eco and Agro Tourism (ECEAT). The project aimed to increase the confidence of the European tourism industry in Thai sustainable tourism, with standards development as a key work package. CBT was one of 5 standards which were developed through participatory processes, including significant input from tourism suppliers in Thailand.

2013: CBT Standards Handbook and future plans

In 2012, the CBT Standard was used as a frame for a CBT destinations awards process, implemented under Thailand's Designated Areas for Sustainable Tourism Administration (DASTA). The standard was simplified and shortened to 100 criteria, while maintaining the core content which had been developed through the participatory CSR- MAP process. The CBT Standards Handbook was published by The Thailand Community Based Tourism Institute (CBT-I) in May 2013.

The CBT Standard will be proposed to the Department of Tourism, Chiang Mai to propose for the standard to be developed into an official Thai tourism standard. The CBT Standard is envisioned to be used as a tool for self-monitoring and evaluation by communities and as a base for exchange with other ASEAN countries.
