= Amazing Thailand =

Thai tourism campaign

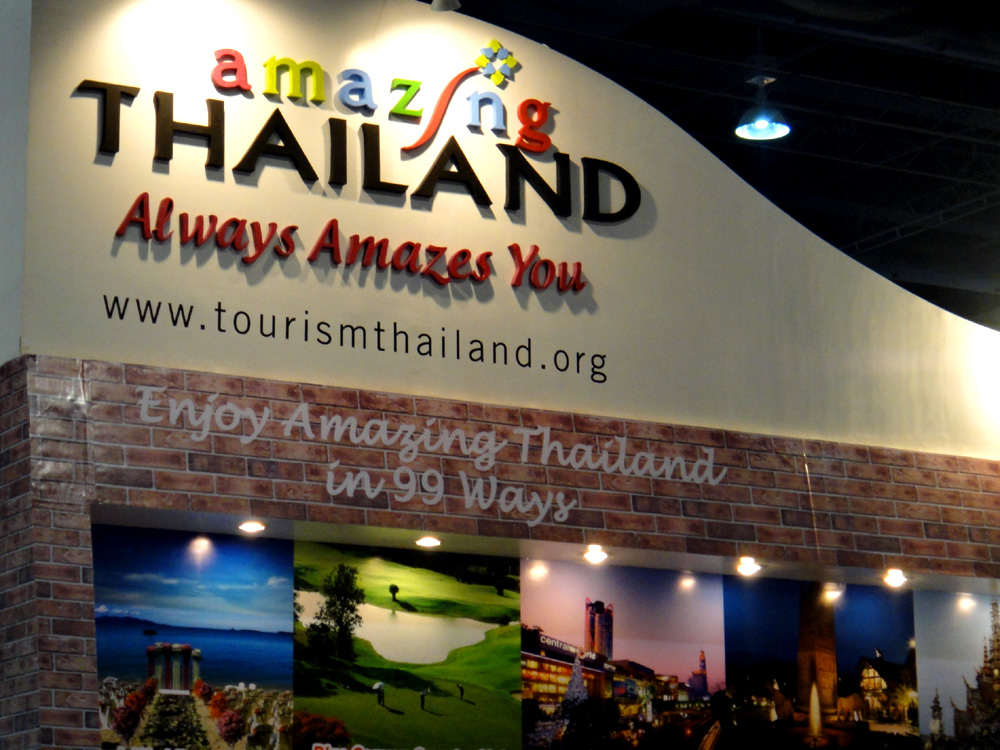
TAT booth at the PTAA Travel Tour Expo 2011 in Manila, featuring the Amazing Thailand slogan

Amazing Thailand is a promotional slogan used by the Tourism Authority of Thailand (TAT) to promote tourism to the country. Originally conceived as a two-year campaign for the years 1998 and 1999, it was extended for several years and has since become a perennial slogan of the TAT.

The original Amazing Thailand campaign was conceived in response to the 1997 financial crisis which crippled the country's economy, in order to leverage the fall in value of the baht to promote tourism and bring in foreign spending. It featured materials with imagery conveying a striking, sensual aesthetic, and identified "nine facets of travel" in its promotion.

The campaign—which was planned to coincide with two major events: the 1998 Asian Games in Bangkok, and the 72nd birthday anniversary of King Bhumibol Adulyadej in 1999—was well received, and was extended into the following years. Amazing Thailand was used as a primary promotional slogan until 2004, and was revived in 2007. It is now usually expanded upon with several taglines or variants on the wording. These include "Amazing Thailand Always Amazes You", introduced in 2011, "Amazing Thailand: It Begins with the People" in 2014, and "Amazing Thailand, Amazing New Chapters" in 2022.

In October 2025, TAT appointed Lisa (rapper) as "Amazing Thailand Ambassador".
