= Thapanee Kiatphaibool =

Thai government official

- ฐาปนีย์ เกียรติไพบูลย์

Governor of the Tourism Authority of Thailand
- Incumbent
- Assumed office 1 September 2023
- Preceded by: Yuthasak Supasorn

Personal details
- Education: University of Surrey (MS)

Thapanee Kiatphaibool (Thai: ฐาปนีย์ เกียรติไพบูลย์; RTGS: Thapani Kiatphaibun) is a Thai tourism official, serving as Governor of the Tourism Authority of Thailand (TAT) since 2023.

== Career ==
Thapanee began working at the TAT in January 1999 as a junior foreign affairs officer at the Governor's Office. She previously served as the TAT's deputy governor for tourism products and business from October 2019 and September 2021, and as deputy governor for domestic marketing from October 2021 to September 2023.

As Governor, she has overseen collaborations with foreign film and television productions filmed in Thailand, including the third season of The White Lotus and Jurassic World 4. In 2024, a visa waiver deal between the governments of Thailand and China was established, projected in increase the number of Chinese tourist arrivals in Thailand.

Following the enactment of the Marriage Equality Act, Thapanee announced efforts to support Thailand's candidacy to host WorldPride 2028.
