= Weerasak Kowsurat =

Thai politician

- วีระศักดิ์ โควสุรัตน์
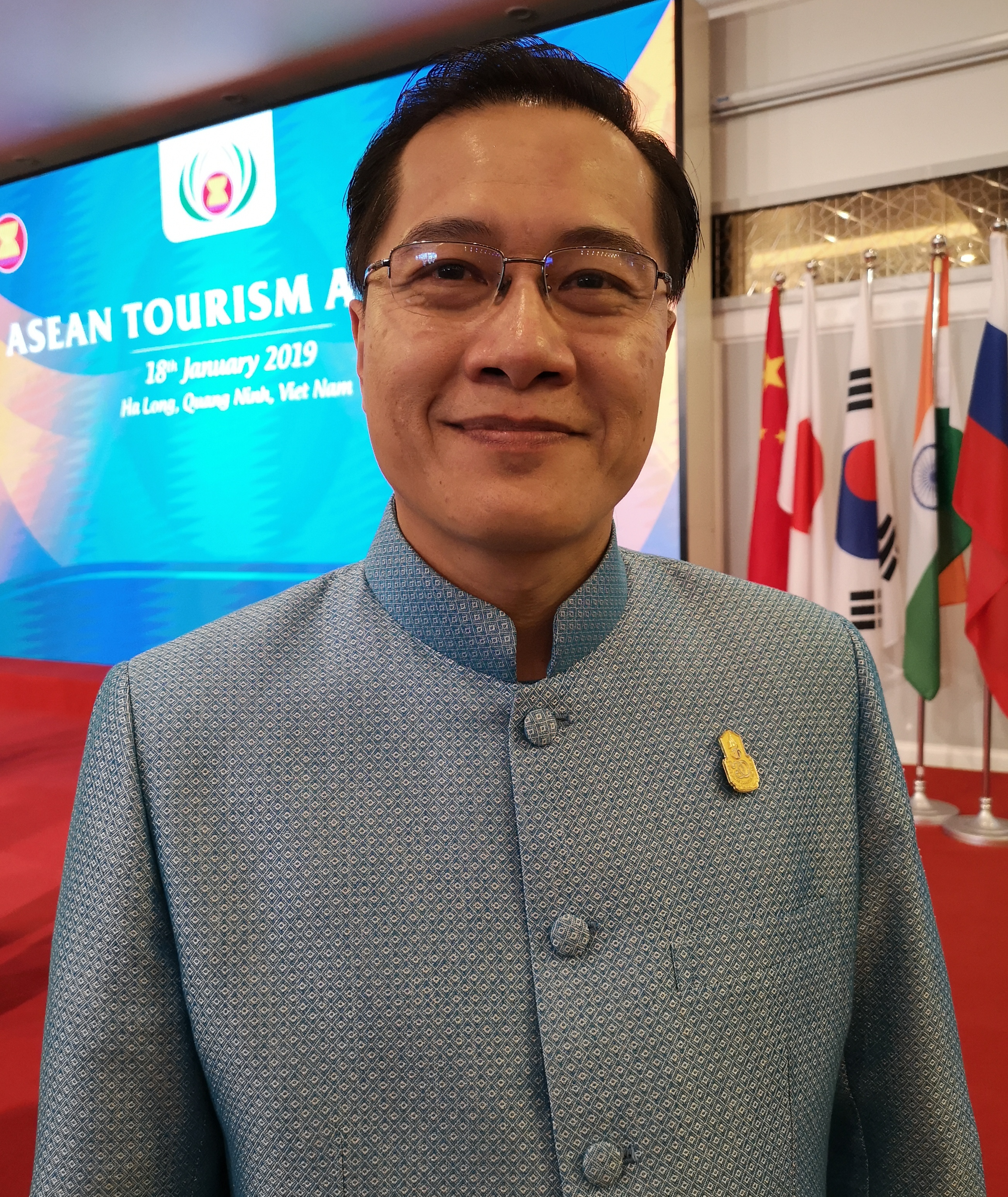
- Weerasak at ASEAN Tourism Forum 2019

Minister of Tourism and Sports
- In office 23 November 2017 – 8 May 2019
- Prime Minister: Prayut Chan-o-cha
- Preceded by: Kobkarn Wattanavrangkul
- Succeeded by: Pipat Ratchakitprakarn
- In office 6 February 2008 – 2 December 2008
- Prime Minister: Samak Sundaravej; Somchai Wongsawat
- Preceded by: Suwit Yodmanee
- Succeeded by: Chumpol Silpa-archa

Personal details
- Born: 23 October 1965 (age 60) Ubon Ratchathani, Thailand
- Party: Thai Nation Party (until 2008)
- Education: Thammasat University; Harvard Law School
- Profession: Politician
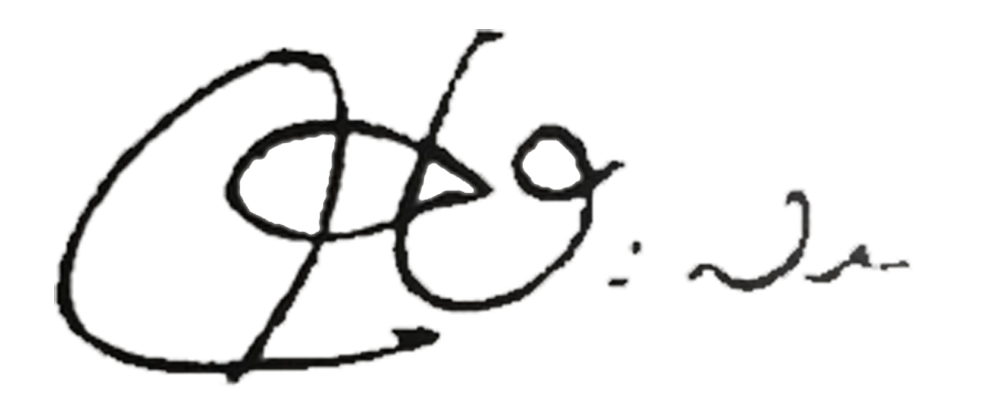
- Signature

Weerasak Kowsurat (Thai: วีระศักดิ์ โควสุรัตน์, RTGS: Wirasak Kosurat; born 23 October 1965) is a former Thai politician. He served as Minister of Tourism and Sports in the first cabinet of Prime Minister Prayut Chan-o-cha. Pipat Ratchakitprakarn was appointed as his successor.

Political offices
Preceded by Kobkarn Wattanavrangkul	Minister of Tourism and Sports; 2017–2019	Succeeded by Pipat Ratchakitprakarn
