= Phipat Ratchakitprakarn =

Thai politician (born 1955)

Phiphat Ratchakitprakarn
- พิพัฒน์ รัชกิจประการ
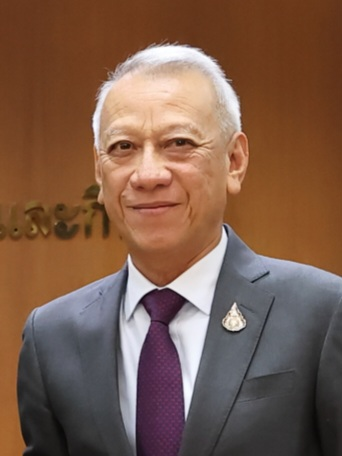
- Phiphat in 2023

Deputy Prime Minister of Thailand
- Incumbent
- Assumed office 19 September 2025
- Prime Minister: Anutin Charnvirakul

Minister of Transport
- Incumbent
- Assumed office 19 September 2025
- Prime Minister: Anutin Charnvirakul
- Preceded by: Suriya Juangroongruangkit

Minister of Labour
- In office 1 September 2023 – 19 June 2025
- Prime Minister: Srettha Thavisin; Paetongtarn Shinawatra
- Preceded by: Suchart Chomklin
- Succeeded by: Pongkawin Juangroongruangkit

Minister of Tourism and Sports
- In office 10 July 2019 – 1 September 2023
- Prime Minister: Prayut Chan-o-cha
- Preceded by: Weerasak Kowsurat
- Succeeded by: Sudawan Wangsuphakijkosol

Personal details
- Born: 5 August 1955 (age 71) Songkhla, Thailand
- Party: Bhumjaithai Party (2011–present)
- Spouse: Nathi Ratchakitprakarn
- Education: Ramkhamhaeng University (BA, MA)

Phiphat Ratchakitprakarn (Thai: พิพัฒน์ รัชกิจประการ, RTGS: Phiphat Ratchakitprakan; born 5 August 1955) is a Thai politician. He currently served as Deputy Prime Minister of Thailand and Minister of Transport in the cabinet of Prime Minister Anutin Charnvirakul. He also has served as Minister of Tourism and Sports in the second cabinet of Prime Minister Prayut Chan-o-cha and Minister of Labour in the Prime Minister Srettha Thavisin and Paetongtarn Shinawatra cabinet.

== Early life and education ==
Phiphat was born in Thepha district, Songkhla province. He graduated from Saengthong Wittaya School in Songkhla and received my Bachelor's and Master's degrees in Political Science from Ramkhamhaeng University.

== Royal decorations ==
Phiphat has received the following royal decorations in the Honours System of Thailand:

- 2022 – Knight Grand Cordon (Special Class) of the Most Exalted Order of the White Elephant
- 2021 – Knight Grand Cordon (Special Class) of the Most Noble Order of the Crown of Thailand

Political offices
| Preceded by Weerasak Kowsurat | Minister of Tourism and Sports; 2019–2023 | Succeeded by Sudawan Wangsuphakijkosol |
| Preceded by Suchart Chomklin | Minister of Labour; 2023–present | Incumbent |
