= Tourism Authority of Thailand =

Government tourism promotion agency

- การท่องเที่ยวแห่งประเทศไทย
- Abbreviation: TAT
- Predecessor: Office of Tourism, Advertising Department, Office of the Prime Minister; Tourist Organization of Thailand
- Formation: 4 May 1979; 47 years ago
- Type: State-owned enterprise
- Headquarters: Ratchathewi, Bangkok
- Governor: Thapanee Kiatphaibool
- Vice Governor: ChattanKunjara Na Ayudhya; Siripakorn Cheawsamoot; Somradee Chitchong; Numfhon Boonyawat; Apichai Chatchalermkit; Nithee Seeprae; Rujiras Chatchalermkit; Teerasil Tapen
- Main organ: Tourism and Sports Ministry
- Budget: 7,094.8 million baht (FY2017)
- Website: Official website

The Tourism Authority of Thailand (TAT) (Thai: การท่องเที่ยวแห่งประเทศไทย) is an organization of Thailand under the Ministry of Tourism and Sports. Its mandate is to promote Thailand's tourism industry, and protect the environment.

== History ==
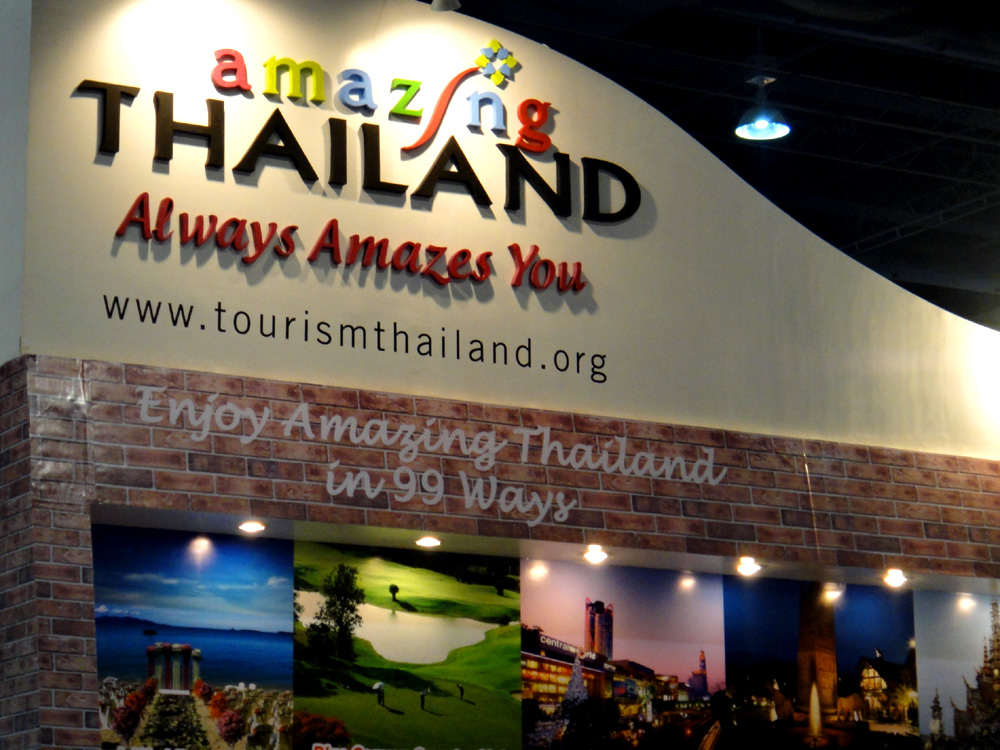
Thailand Tourism booth at a Travel and Tour Expo

Its predecessor, Tourism of Thailand, was founded in 1924. Aimed at attracting tourists to Thailand, its responsibility bounced around between the State Railway of Thailand, the Ministry of Commerce, the Ministry of Transport and the Office of the Prime Minister. The current organisation, the Tourism Authority of Thailand (TAT), was established on 4 May 1979.

== Initiatives ==
TAT uses the slogan "Amazing Thailand" to promote Thailand internationally. In 2015, this was supplemented by a "Discover Thainess" campaign.

In 2015, TAT introduced a campaign titled "2015: Discover Thainess." TAT Governor Thawatchai Arunyik said the campaign will incorporate the "twelve values" that Thai junta leader and Prime Minister Prayut Chan-o-cha wants all Thais to practice.

In 2017, the Thai government approved a 144 million baht budget to fund the Michelin Guide in a five-year contract to create Michelin Guides for Thailand, starting with Bangkok. The Michelin Guide to Bangkok was released on 6 December 2017.

At the 69th Cannes Film Festival in 2016, Thailand introduced a cash rebate policy for foreign films shot in Thailand. It took effect in January 2017.

== Budget ==
TAT's budget for FY2017 is 7,094.8 million baht.

== See also ==
- Tourism in Thailand
