= MICE tourism =

Type of tourism

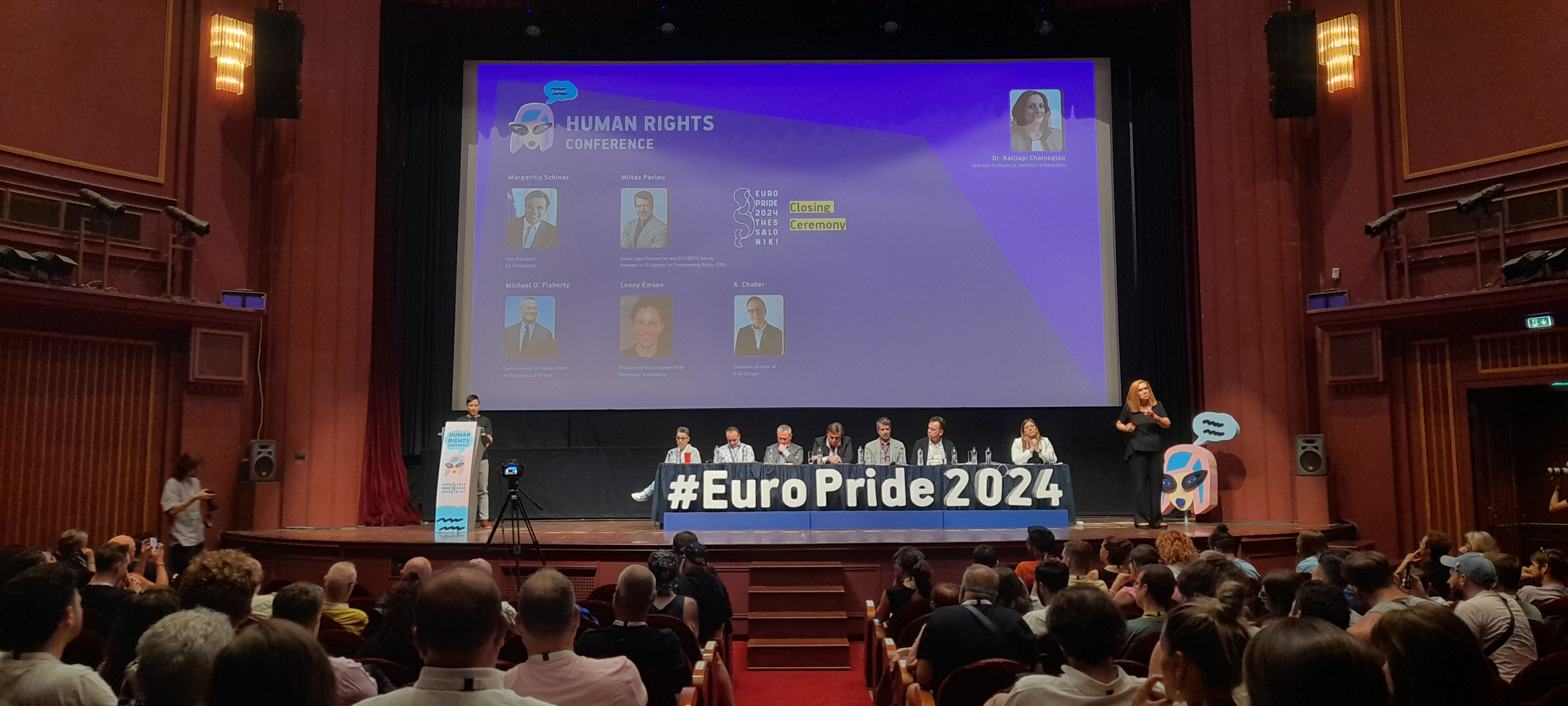
Closing panel at the Human Rights Conference at OLYMPION hotel for 2024 Thessaloniki Europride

The term MICE tourism (Meetings, Incentives, Conferences, and Exhibitions tourism) refers to a specific type of business tourism in which organized groups, generally planned well in advance, are convened for professional, commercial, or networking purposes. The MICE sector is a fundamental component of the "events industry" and includes a wide range of activities such as conferences, congresses, conventions, forums, summits, exhibitions and trade shows, seminars, symposiums, workshops, product launches, board meetings and shareholder meetings, executive retreats and incentive programs, recognition events, celebrations of corporate or organizational milestones, and team-building initiatives.

According to Allied Market Research, the global MICE market is expected to reach $1.8 trillion by 2031, growing at a CAGR of 6.6%..

Most components of MICE are self-explanatory, with the possible exception of incentives. Incentive tourism typically involves organized trips offered by companies or institutions as rewards for employees, clients, or partners who have achieved specific goals or exceptional performance.

Unlike other MICE components, which focus on professional or educational objectives, incentive tourism primarily aims to reward and motivate participants through leisure-oriented experiences, though it may include team-building or networking activities. MICE events are typically organized around specific themes or objectives, targeting professional, academic, trade, or special interest groups.

== Convention bureaus ==
MICE event locations are normally bid on by specialized convention bureaus in particular countries and cities and established for the purpose of bidding on MICE activities. This process of marketing and bidding is normally conducted well in advance of the event, often several years, as securing major events can benefit the local economy of the host city or country. Convention bureaus may offer financial subsidies to attract MICE events to their city. Today it is usually used to boost hotel revenue.

MICE tourism is known for its extensive planning and demanding clientele.

== See also ==
- MICE in Singapore
- MICE in Thailand
- Singapore Tourism Board
- Business tourism
- Convention bureau
