= Kobkarn Wattanavrangkul =

Thai politician (born 1960)

- กอบกาญจน์ วัฒนวรางกูร
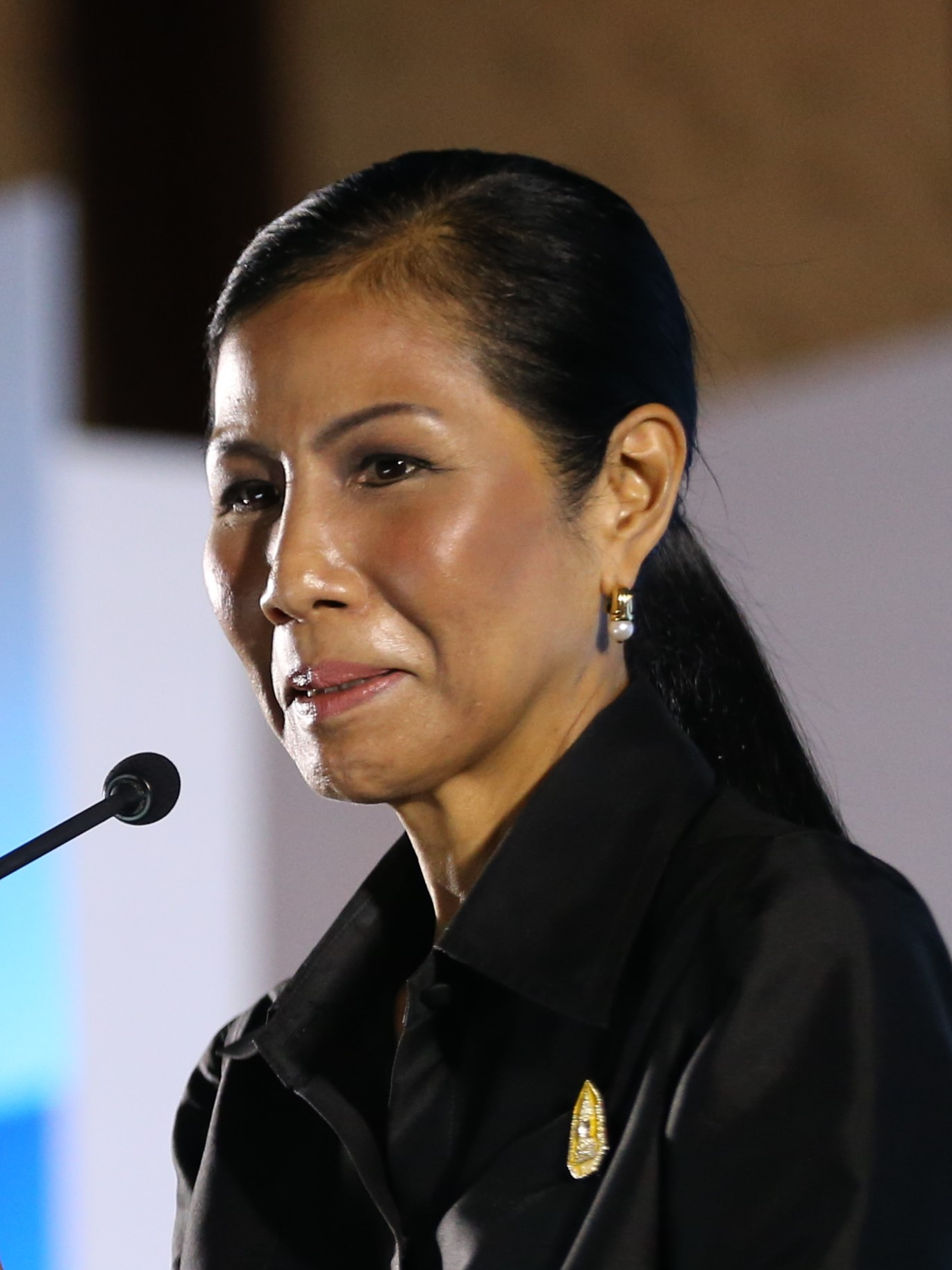
- Kobkarn at Horasis Asia meeting in 2016

Minister of Tourism and Sports
- In office 30 August 2014 – 23 November 2017
- Prime Minister: Prayut Chan-o-cha
- Preceded by: Somsak Purisrisak
- Succeeded by: Weerasak Kowsurat

Personal details
- Born: กอบกาญจน์ สุริยสัตย์ 19 September 1960 (age 66) Bangkok, Thailand
- Spouse: Chonnasit Wattanavrangkul
- Education: Rhode Island School of Design
- Profession: Politician; businesswoman

Kobkarn Wattanavrangkul (Thai: กอบกาญจน์ วัฒนวรางกูร, RTGS: Kopkan Watthanawarangkun, born 19 September 1960; née Suriyasat (Thai: สุริยสัตย์)) is a former Thai politician. She served as Minister of Tourism and Sports in the first cabinet of Prime Minister Prayut Chan-o-cha.

As of April 2020, she serves as chairperson of the board of Kasikornbank.

== Honours ==
Kobkarn Wattanavrangkul has received the following royal decorations in the Honours System of Thailand:

=== Royal Decorations ===
- Knight Grand Cordon (Special Class) of the Most Exalted Order of the White Elephant: 28 September 2017
- Knight Grand Cordon (First Class) of the Most Noble Order of the Crown of Thailand: 4 December 2015

=== Foreign honours ===
- Order of the Rising Sun, Gold and Silver Star: 11 November 2022

Political offices
Preceded by Somsak Purisrisak	Minister of Tourism and Sports; 2014–2017	Succeeded by Weerasak Kowsurat
