= Ministry of Tourism and Sports (Thailand) =

Government ministry of Thailand

- กระทรวงการท่องเที่ยวและกีฬา
- Seal of the Lord of Strength riding Airavata above the royal barge Suphannahong

- Flag of the Lord of Strength riding Airavata above the royal barge Suphannahong

Ministry overview
- Formed: 3 October 2002; 23 years ago
- Jurisdiction: Government of Thailand
- Headquarters: Pom Prap Sattru Phai, Bangkok
- Annual budget: 6,413.9 million baht ($200M) (FY2019)
- Minister responsible: Surasak Phancharoenworakul, Minister
- Ministry executive: Natthriya Thaweevong, Permanent Secretary
- Website: mots.go.th

The Ministry of Tourism and Sports (Abrv: MOTS; Thai: กระทรวงการท่องเที่ยวและกีฬา, RTGS: Krasuang Kan Thongthiao Lae Kila) is a cabinet ministry in the Government of Thailand. The ministry's primary areas of responsibility are tourism and sports. The ministry is in charge of managing the tourist industry and sports both in schools and other institutions. The ministry organizes and directs Thailand's important sporting events. Its FY2019 budget is 6,413.9 million baht.

As of October 2019, the Minister of Tourism and Sports is Phipat Ratchakitprakarn.

== History ==
The ministry was created in 2003 during the administration of Prime Minister Thaksin Shinawatra. The government wanted a sports ministry, but the senate refused to support it as professional sports were not big enough to warrant a ministry. To overcome the objection, the government added tourism to the ministry's portfolio. Two agencies manage Thai tourism: The Tourism Authority of Thailand (TAT), is responsible for "bodycount", i.e., attracting visitors. The Department of Tourism in the Sports and Tourism Ministry regulates the industry and manages infrastructure. TAT's success in driving up numbers—more than 35 million visitors arrived in 2017—has overwhelmed the 130 employees responsible for managing the industry.

=== Ministry of Sports ===
Later, on June 18, 2026, Surasak Panjaroenvorakul, the Minister of Tourism and Sports, revealed the progress of the draft bill on the restructuring of ministries, departments, and agencies. The key aspect of this would be the merger of ministries, with tourism responsibilities being moved to the Ministry of Culture to form the "Ministry of Culture and Tourism," and the establishment of a new ministry under the name "Ministry of Sports."

Regarding the details of the restructuring, including asset allocation, personnel, staffing levels, and internal agencies, as well as the definition of additional missions for the new ministry, it is necessary to gather feedback from relevant civil servants before proceeding. This process is currently underway as the Office of the Civil Service Commission (OCSC) is preparing to submit the draft bill to the Cabinet for approval before submitting it to the House of Representatives. It is expected to be submitted to the Cabinet sometime between June and July 2026.

This meeting was held in accordance with the resolution of the Civil Service Commission (CSC) meeting No. 3/2026 on May 19, 2026. The meeting approved guidelines for restructuring government agencies based on new missions to increase efficiency in public administration. Key aspects include transferring and redistributing functions of government agencies, assigning all tourism-related tasks primarily to the Ministry of Culture and Tourism to achieve concrete integration in cultural and tourism promotion. Simultaneously, sports-related tasks were assigned primarily to the newly established Ministry of Sports to clarify and streamline the management of national sports development. Furthermore, the meeting approved in principle the draft Act amending the Ministries, Departments, and Agencies Act (No. ...) B.E. .... to serve as the legal mechanism to support these changes in authority and organizational structure, ensuring compliance with legal procedures and alignment with national development strategies.

On June 25, 2026, Pakorn Nilapraphan, Deputy Prime Minister for Legal Affairs revealed the progress of the draft Act amending the Ministries, Departments, and Agencies Act, stating that the drafting of the law was complete. On June 24, 2026, the Office of the Civil Service Commission (OCSC) sent the draft law to the Cabinet Secretariat to circulate and solicit opinions on management from two relevant agencies.

It is expected that the process will take no more than one month before being submitted to the Cabinet for consideration in July or August 2026. Following this, it will proceed to parliamentary review. Based on the planned timeline, the draft law is anticipated to be enacted within 2026.

On June 29, 2026, Weerasak Kowsurat, Chief Advisor to the Deputy Prime Minister and former Minister of Tourism and Sports, proposed the establishment of a "Tourism Economics Office" within the Ministry of Culture and Tourism to serve as the primary agency for analyzing data and formulating structural policies.

On July 1, 2026, Prasop Riangngern, Permanent Secretary of the Ministry of Culture, and Natthriya Thaweevong, Permanent Secretary of the Ministry of Tourism and Sports, along with executives from both ministries, held a meeting at the Ministry of Tourism and Sports to prepare for the implementation of the draft Act on the Restructuring of Ministries, Departments, and Agencies, which the Office of the Public Sector Development Commission is currently submitting to the Cabinet. The meeting exchanged information on the structure, missions, staffing, budget, and performance of both ministries, including their affiliated agencies, state enterprises, and public organizations. They also discussed the transfer of tourism-related responsibilities to the Ministry of Culture and Tourism, and the preparation of personnel, budget, systems, laws, assets, information technology, and relevant data to ensure a smooth and efficient transition without disrupting public services. Furthermore, the meeting agreed to establish a joint working group between the two ministries to coordinate, integrate information, conduct detailed analyses, and make proposals in collaboration with central agencies. This group will also drive communication efforts to build knowledge, understanding, and accurate awareness among personnel, the media, network partners, and the public to foster confidence and support operations during the transition period.

Later, on July 2, 2026, Surasak revealed that the Office of the Civil Service Commission would submit the draft bill on the restructuring of ministries, departments, and agencies to the Cabinet meeting, possibly as early as July 7, 2026.

== Departments ==
=== Administration ===
- Office of the Minister
- Office of the Permanent Secretary
- Department of Tourism
- Department of Physical Education
- Institute of Physical Education

=== Provincial Administration ===
- Office of Tourism and Sports Province Division

=== State enterprises ===
- Sports Authority of Thailand
- Tourism Authority of Thailand

=== Public Organization ===
- Designated Areas for Sustainable Tourism Administration Organization

== See also ==
- Tourism in Thailand
- Cabinet of Thailand
- List of Government Ministers of Thailand
- Government of Thailand
