= Marshal of the air force =

Military rank

Marshal of the air force or marshal of the air is a five-star rank (or NATO equivalent OF-10) and an English-language term for the most senior rank in some air forces. It is usually the direct equivalent of a general of the air force in other air forces, a field marshal or general of the army in many armies, or a naval admiral of the fleet.

The rank originated in the British Royal Air Force (RAF), in which the most senior rank remains Marshal of the RAF. Several other Commonwealth air forces and others that have been influenced by the practices of the RAF (especially in the Middle East) have similar names for the most senior rank, such as Marshal of the Royal Australian Air Force (RAAF). There is sometimes confusion with the next most senior ranks in such cases: air chief marshal and air marshal (proper). The rank of Marshal of the RAF existed on paper from 1919; the first person to hold the rank was Lord Hugh Trenchard, from 1927. In the UK the rank has often been held by the most senior, actively-serving RAF officer, whereas in other Commonwealth countries the equivalent rank has been purely ceremonial or honorary in function. (For example, the rank of Marshal of the RAAF has been held only by a monarch or consort.)

In Portuguese the equivalent air force ranks are Marechal do Ar (lit. "Marshal of the Air") in Brazil, or Marechal in Portugal, both of which are sometimes translated as "marshal of the air force". In the past, a similar name has been used for the most senior rank in Italian air forces.

A holder of several senior ranks in the Indonesian air force (Tentara Nasional Indonesia-Angkatan Udara; TNI-AU), may be referred to as a marsekal di TNI-AU (lit. "marshal of the TNI-AU"). The most senior rank is Marsekal Besar ("Grand Marshal") is sometimes translated as "marshal of the air force".

In Nazi Germany, the most senior rank of the Luftwaffe was Generalfeldmarschall (a rank that was also used by the German Army). While the commander of the Luftwaffe, Hermann Göring was the only person to hold the more senior rank of Reichsmarschall, this rank could technically have been bestowed on any senior officer of the Heer (army), Kriegsmarine (navy) and Luftwaffe, which together comprised the Wehrmacht.

While the air forces of the former Soviet Union had ranks named chief marshal of the aviation branch (or "chief marshal of the air force") and marshal of the aviation branch (or "marshal of the air force"), these were four-star and three-star ranks, respectively (and therefore equivalent to the less senior RAF ranks of Air Chief Marshal and Air Marshal respectively).

== Seniority ==
A marshal of the air force can be properly considered equivalent to an army marshal or field marshal in many countries, as well as the naval rank of admiral of the fleet. That is, marshal of the air force is a five-star rank and in NATO countries it is described by the ranking code of OF-10. As such a senior rank, it is very seldom held. It is awarded either in a ceremonial capacity to heads of state, to members of royal families, or to the most senior officers in large air forces.

In the Air Force of Australia, India, Thailand and the United Kingdom, "Marshals of the Air Force" are immediately senior to Air Chief Marshals. In the case of New Zealand, although the rank of Marshal of the Royal New Zealand Air Force has been bestowed, no Royal New Zealand Air Force officer has attained higher rank than Air Marshal and the New Zealand rank of Air Chief Marshal only exists on paper. A similar situation to the one in New Zealand also existed in Malaysia until the 1970s when the Royal Malaysian Air Force replaced its air-officer ranks with general-officer ranks, although it retained the rank of Marshal of the Royal Malaysian Air Force. The rank of Marshal of the Royal Canadian Air Force was never granted.

During Germany's Nazi period, the Luftwaffe (Air Force), in common with the Heer (Army), used the rank of generalfeldmarschall (Field Marshal), which was equivalent to großadmiral (Grand Admiral) in the Navy. Generalfeldmarschall was immediately senior to generaloberst (Colonel General) and it was the most senior German Air Force and Army rank until the promotion of Hermann Göring, the Commander of the Luftwaffe, to the even higher rank of reichsmarschall (Imperial Marshal or Marshal of the Realm) in July 1940. The German ranks of reichsmarschall and generalfeldmarschall ceased to exist with the fall of the Third Reich.

== Insignia and distinguishing flags ==
=== Rank insignia ===
There are a variety of rank insignia in use by the different air forces which maintain a rank of marshal of the air force. Some, such as the Royal Air Force, derive the pattern from the sleeve lace for an admiral of the fleet, using one broad light blue band on a wider broad black band with four narrow light blue bands each on slightly wider black bands. Others use a pattern of stars, typically numbering five in total.

Marshal of the Royal Air Force (United Kingdom)

Marshal of the Indian Air Force (India)

Marshal of the Royal Australian Air Force (Australia)

Marshal of the Royal New Zealand Air Force (New Zealand)

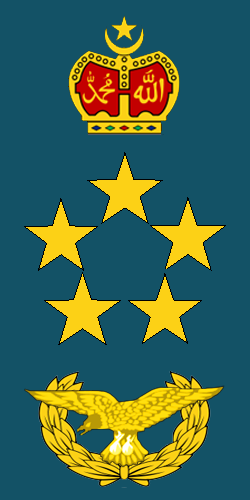
Marshal of the Royal Malaysian Air Force (Malaysia)

Marshal of the Air Force (Marsekal Besar) (Indonesia)

Marshal of the Royal Thai Air Force (จอมพลอากาศ) (Thailand)

Marshal of the Air (Marechal do Ar) (Brazil)

Marshal of the Air Force (Marechal da Força Aérea) (Portugal)

=== Command flags ===
The following command or rank flags are or have been in use:

Marshal of the Royal Air Force (United Kingdom)

Marshal of the Royal Thai Air Force (จอมพลอากาศ) (Thailand)

Marshal of the Indian Air Force (India)

Marshal of the Royal Air Force of Malaysia

== Current holders of the rank ==
As of 2017, there are 14 living individuals who hold or have held the rank, or its equivalents, of Marshal of the Air Force. Ten of those are royalty who have been appointed to the rank in a ceremonial capacity, including Queen Sirikit of Thailand, King Charles III of the United Kingdom, and the current head of state of Malaysia. In the case of Malaysia, the elected Yang di-Pertuan Agong is appointed a Marshal of the Air Force for his tenure as head of state, but relinquishes the rank after completing his term in office. He can, however, be re-appointed to the rank if he later serves another term.

Prince Philip, the Duke of Edinburgh, held the ceremonial rank of a Marshal of the Royal Air Force, as well as the honorary ranks of Marshal of the Royal Australian Air Force and Marshal of the Royal New Zealand Air Force; owing to their smaller size, however, neither of the latter two air forces have ever used the rank in an operational capacity. Although the rank of Marshal of the Royal Canadian Air Force existed on paper until 1968, the Duke of Edinburgh was never appointed to this rank nor to the other Canadian five-star ranks before they were abolished that year. In 2012, his son, the Prince of Wales, was appointed to the British rank.

The remaining four holders of the rank were all serving air officers, three of whom served as Chief of the Air Staff of the Royal Air Force, and were promoted to the rank of Marshal of the Royal Air Force upon concluding their tenure. Of those, only Lord Craig did not retire then, as he went on to serve as Chief of the Defence Staff as a Marshal of the RAF. In June 2014, retired Air Chief Marshal the Lord Stirrup was promoted to Marshal of the RAF in a ceremonial capacity, marking the first time since 1992 that an RAF air officer had been awarded the rank; Lord Stirrup had served as Chief of the Defence Staff from 2006 to 2010.

Marshal of the Air Force Roshan Goonetileke of the Sri Lanka Air Force is the most recent man to gain the rank, having been promoted in October 2019. Goonetileke was credited in playing a major role in ending the almost three decade-long civil war in his country. He was recently appointed as the Governor of the Western Province of Sri Lanka.

== List of marshals of the air force ==
Country	Year of promotion / appointment	Portrait	Officer	Rank	Year of birth	Year of death	Notes
Australia	1938		King George VI	Marshal of the Royal Australian Air Force	1895	1952	Assumed the rank 2 June 1938.
Australia	1954		Prince Philip, Duke of Edinburgh	Marshal of the Royal Australian Air Force	1921	2021	Honorary rank. Appointed 1 April 1954.
Australia	2024		King Charles III	Marshal of the Royal Australian Air Force	1948	-	Honorary rank. Appointed 19 October 2024.
Bahrain			Hamad ibn Isa Al Khalifah	Marshal of the Royal Bahrain Air Force	1950	-	Honorary rank.
Brazil	1959		Armando Figueira Trompowsky de Almeida	Marechal-do-ar	1889	1964	Promoted 30 January 1959
Brazil	1960		Eduardo Gomes	Marechal-do-ar	1896	1981	Patron of the Brazilian Air Force. Promoted 22 September 1960.
Brazil			Casimiro Montenegro Filho	Marechal-do-ar	1904	2000	
Egypt			King Farouk	Marshal of the Royal Egyptian Air Force	1920	1965	Honorary rank.
Egypt	1952		King Fuad II	Marshal of the Royal Egyptian Air Force	1952	-	Honorary rank. Appointed 26 July 1952 at the age of six months.
Ethiopia			Emperor Haile Selassie I	Marshal of the Imperial Ethiopian Air Force	1892	1975	Honorary rank.
Ethiopia			Amha Selassie	Marshal of the Imperial Ethiopian Air Force	1916	1997	Honorary rank.
Germany	1938		Hermann Göring	Reichsmarschall	1893	1946	Promoted to Generalfeldmarschall 4 February 1938, promoted to Reichsmarschall 19 July 1940
Germany	1940		Albert Kesselring	Generalfeldmarschall	1885	1960	Promoted 19 July 1940
Germany	1940		Erhard Milch	Generalfeldmarschall	1892	1972	Promoted 19 July 1940
Germany	1940		Hugo Sperrle	Generalfeldmarschall	1885	1953	Promoted 19 July 1940
Germany	1943		Wolfram Freiherr von Richthofen	Generalfeldmarschall	1895	1945	Promoted 16 February 1943
Germany	1945		Robert Ritter von Greim	Generalfeldmarschall	1892	1945	Promoted 25 April 1945
Greece	1937		George II of Greece	Marshal of the Royal Hellenic Air Force	1890	1947	Honorary rank as commander-in-chef of the Greek armed forces.
Greece	1947		Paul of Greece	Marshal of the Royal Hellenic Air Force	1901	1964	Honorary rank as commander-in-chef of the Greek armed forces.
Greece	1964		Constantine II of Greece	Marshal of the Royal Hellenic Air Force	1940	2023	Honorary rank as commander-in-chef of the Greek armed forces.
India	2002		Arjan Singh	Marshal of the Indian Air Force	1919	2017	Promoted. 26 January 2002
Iraq	1933		King Ghazi	Marshal of the Royal Iraqi Air Force	1912	1939	Honorary rank. Appointed 8 September 1933
Iraq	1939		Prince Abdul Illah	Marshal of the Royal Iraqi Air Force	1913	1958	Honorary rank. Appointed 6 April 1939
Iraq	1953		King Faisal II	Marshal of the Royal Iraqi Air Force	1935	1958	Honorary rank. Appointed 2 May 1953
Italy	1933		Italo Balbo	Maresciallo dell'Aria	1896	1940	Promoted August 1933
Jordan			HM King Hussein of Jordan	Marshal of the Royal Jordanian Air Force	1935	1999	Honorary rank.
Jordan	1999		King Abdullah II	Marshal of the Royal Jordanian Air Force	1962	-	Honorary rank. Appointed 7 February 1999
Malaysia	1970		Sultan Abdul Halim	Marshal of the Royal Malaysian Air Force	1927	2017	Honorary rank. Appointed 21 September 1970. Relinquished role as Head of State on 20 September 1975. Re-appointed Head of State on 13 December 2011.
Malaysia	1975		Sultan Yahya Petra	Marshal of the Royal Malaysian Air Force	1917	1979	Honorary rank. Appointed 21 September 1975
Malaysia	1979		Sultan Ahmad Shah	Marshal of the Royal Malaysian Air Force	1930	2019	Honorary rank. Appointed 30 March 1979
Malaysia	1984		Sultan Iskandar	Marshal of the Royal Malaysian Air Force	1932	2010	Honorary rank. Appointed 26 April 1984, died 22 January 2010.
Malaysia	1989		Sultan Azlan Shah	Marshal of the Royal Malaysian Air Force	1928	2014	Honorary rank. Appointed 26 April 1989 died 28 May 2014.
Malaysia	1994		Tuanku Jaafar	Marshal of the Royal Malaysian Air Force	1922	2008	Honorary rank. Appointed 26 April 1994, died 27 December 2008.
Malaysia	1999		Salahuddin	Marshal of the Royal Malaysian Air Force	1926	2001	Honorary rank. Appointed 26 April 1999 died 21 November 2001.
Malaysia	2001		Tuanku Syed Sirajuddin	Marshal of the Royal Malaysian Air Force	1943	-	Honorary rank. Appointed 12 December 2001.
Malaysia	2007		Mizan Zainal Abidin	Marshal of the Royal Malaysian Air Force	1962	-	Honorary rank. Appointed 16 February 2007.
New Zealand	1977		Prince Philip, Duke of Edinburgh	Marshal of the Royal New Zealand Air Force	1921	2021	Honorary rank. Appointed 11 June 1977.
New Zealand	2015		King Charles III	Marshal of the Royal New Zealand Air Force	1948	-	Honorary rank. Appointed 2 August 2015.
Oman	1974		Sultan Qaboos	Marshal of the Royal Air Force of Oman	1940	2020	Honorary rank.
Portugal	1958		Francisco Craveiro Lopes	Marechal da Força Aérea	1894	1964	Honorary rank.
Portugal	1990		Humberto Delgado	Marechal da Força Aérea	1906	1965	Posthumous promotion.
Saudi Arabia	1991		Prince Khalid bin Sultan	Field Marshal	1949	-	
Sri Lanka	2019		Roshan Goonetileke	Marshal of the Sri Lanka Air Force	1956	-	Honorary rank. Promoted 7 August 2019.
Thailand	1941		Plaek Phibunsongkhram	Marshal of the Royal Thai Air Force	1897	1964	Appointed 28 July 1941.
Thailand	1954		Fuen Ronnaphagrad Ritthakhanee	Marshal of the Royal Thai Air Force	1900	1987	Appointed 27 July 1954.
Thailand	1959		Sarit Dhanarajata	Marshal of the Royal Thai Air Force	1908	1963	Honorary rank. Appointed 28 February 1959.
Thailand	1960		Chalermkiat Vatthanangkun	Marshal of the Royal Thai Air Force	1914	1960	Awarded Posthumously, after plane crashed while on duty. Appointed 24 May 1960.
Thailand	1964		Thanom Kittikachorn	Marshal of the Royal Thai Air Force	1911	2004	Honorary rank. Appointed 11 January 1964. Appointed himself.
Thailand	1973		Praphas Charusathien	Marshal of the Royal Thai Air Force	1912	1997	Honorary rank. Appointed 6 June 1973.
Thailand	1992		Queen Sirikit	Marshal of the Royal Thai Air Force	1932	-	Honorary rank. Appointed 4 August 1992. Possibly the only woman to have held such rank.
United Kingdom	1927		Hugh Trenchard, 1st Viscount Trenchard	Marshal of the Royal Air Force	1873	1956	Promoted 1 January 1927.
United Kingdom	1933		Sir John Salmond	Marshal of the Royal Air Force	1881	1968	Promoted 1 January 1933.
United Kingdom	1936		King Edward VIII	Marshal of the Royal Air Force	1894	1972	Honorary rank. Appointed 21 January 1936.
United Kingdom	1936		King George VI	Marshal of the Royal Air Force	1895	1952	Honorary rank. Appointed 11 December 1936.
United Kingdom	1937		Sir Edward Ellington	Marshal of the Royal Air Force	1877	1967	Promoted 1 January 1937.
United Kingdom	1940		Cyril Newall, 1st Baron Newall	Marshal of the Royal Air Force	1886	1963	Promoted 4 October 1940. Retired 20 days later.
United Kingdom	1944		Charles Portal, 1st Viscount Portal of Hungerford	Marshal of the Royal Air Force	1893	1971	Promoted 1 June 1944.
United Kingdom	1945		Arthur Tedder, 1st Baron Tedder	Marshal of the Royal Air Force	1890	1967	Promoted 12 September 1945.
United Kingdom	1946		Sholto Douglas, 1st Baron Douglas of Kirtleside	Marshal of the Royal Air Force	1893	1969	Promoted 1 January 1946.
United Kingdom	1946		Sir Arthur Harris	Marshal of the Royal Air Force	1892	1984	Promoted 1 January 1946, several months after retirement.
United Kingdom	1950		Sir John Slessor	Marshal of the Royal Air Force	1897	1979	Promoted 8 June 1950.
United Kingdom	1953		Prince Philip, Duke of Edinburgh	Marshal of the Royal Air Force	1921	2021	Honorary rank. Appointed 15 January 1953.
United Kingdom	1954		Sir William Dickson	Marshal of the Royal Air Force	1898	1987	Promoted 1 June 1954.
United Kingdom	1958		Sir Dermot Boyle	Marshal of the Royal Air Force	1904	1993	Promoted 1 January 1958.
United Kingdom	1958		Prince Henry, Duke of Gloucester	Marshal of the Royal Air Force	1900	1974	Honorary rank. Appointed 12 June 1958.
United Kingdom	1962		Sir Thomas Pike	Marshal of the Royal Air Force	1906	1983	Promoted 6 April 1962.
United Kingdom	1967		Charles Elworthy, Baron Elworthy	Marshal of the Royal Air Force	1911	1993	Promoted 1 April 1967.
United Kingdom	1971		Sir John Grandy	Marshal of the Royal Air Force	1913	2004	Promoted and retired on the same day (1 April 1971).
United Kingdom	1974		Sir Denis Spotswood	Marshal of the Royal Air Force	1916	2001	Promoted and retired on the same day (31 March 1974).
United Kingdom	1976		Sir Andrew Humphrey	Marshal of the Royal Air Force	1921	1977	Promoted 6 August 1976.
United Kingdom	1977		Neil Cameron, Baron Cameron of Balhousie	Marshal of the Royal Air Force	1920	1985	Promoted 31 July 1977.
United Kingdom	1982		Sir Michael Beetham	Marshal of the Royal Air Force	1923	2015	Promoted and retired on the same day (14 October 1982).
United Kingdom	1985		Sir Keith Williamson	Marshal of the Royal Air Force	1928	2018	Promoted and retired on the same day (15 October 1985).
United Kingdom	1988		David Craig, Baron Craig of Radley	Marshal of the Royal Air Force	1929	-	Promoted 14 November 1988.
United Kingdom	1992		Sir Peter Harding	Marshal of the Royal Air Force	1933	2021	Promoted 6 November 1992. Resigned commission 14 June 1994.
United Kingdom	2012		King Charles III	Marshal of the Royal Air Force	1948	-	Honorary rank. Appointed 16 June 2012.
United Kingdom	2014		Jock Stirrup, Baron Stirrup	Marshal of the Royal Air Force	1949	-	Honorary rank. Promoted 13 June 2014.

== Other countries ==
The rank also exists or has existed (on paper) in Afghanistan, Bangladesh, Brunei, Iran, South Korea, Nigeria, Pakistan and South Vietnam, but not all of these countries have used it. The Turkish Air Force maintains a rank of hava mareşalı (literally air marshal but equivalent to five-star rank). The Indonesian Air Force maintains the rank of marsekal besar (literally, "great marshal" and also a five-star rank) although no Indonesian Air Force officer has ever been promoted to the rank. The French Air Force, in common with the French Army has marshal of France as its most senior rank. However, unlike the French Army, the Air Force has never had one of its officers created a marshal of France.

The United States does not use the rank, instead using general of the air force which has only been held once and is currently retained only on paper. China also does not use a marshal rank, preferring first class general (kong jun yi ji shang jiang) which has never been held by an air force officer and was abolished in 1994. Spain uses the equivalent rank of captain general of the Air Force which is held only by HM King Felipe VI.

== Fictional use ==
A marshal of the air force is mentioned in Roald Dahl's book The BFG. Dahl himself was a Royal Air Force officer during World War II.

== See also ==
- Air force officer rank insignia
