= 1939 in Thailand =

- Decades: 1910s; 1920s; 1930s; 1940s; 1950s
- See also: Other events of 1939; Timeline of Thai history

The year 1939 was the 158th year of the Rattanakosin Kingdom of Siam. It was the fifth year in the reign of King Ananda Mahidol (Rama VIII), and is reckoned as year 2481 (1 January – 31 March) and 2482 (1 April – 31 December) in the Buddhist Era. The name of the country was changed to Thailand this year.

== Incumbents ==
- King: Prajadhipok (Rama VII)
- Prime Minister: Field Marshal Plaek Phibunsongkhram
