= 1973 Thai popular uprising =

Student-led demonstrations in Thailand

14 October uprising
- Thousands of students gather at Ratchadamnoen Avenue, 1973
- Date: 9 October 1973 – 15 October 1973 (6 days)
- Location: Ratchadamnoen Avenue, Bangkok
- Caused by: The Thung Yai hunting scandal; Military dictatorship; The start of a movement of intellectual and leftist university students
- Goals: End of the Thanom military regime; Drafting of the new permanent constitution
- Methods: Sit-ins, occupation of public avenues, protest march
- Result: Thanom Kittikachorn, Praphas Charusathien, and Narong Kittikachorn fled the country; Sanya Dharmasakti appointed as prime minister by Bhumibol Adulyadej; Bhumibol Adulyadej appointed 2,347-person group in a process of drafting new constitution; End of United States Air Force in Thailand

Parties
The National Student Center of Thailand
- (Thailand) Royal Thai Government
  - Royal Thai Army
    - 11th Infantry Regiment, King's Guard
    - 4th Tank Battalion
  - Royal Thai Police
    - Metropolitan Police Bureau
    - Crime Suppression Division
Backed by
- United States

Lead figures
Thirayuth Boonmee; Seksan Prasertkul	Thanom Kittikachorn; Praphas Charusathien; Narong Kittikachorn

Number
500,000	

Casualties
- Deaths: 77
- Injuries: 857
- Damage: Buildings near Ratchadamnoen Avenue were set on fire

The popular uprising of 14 October 1973 (Thai: เหตุการณ์ 14 ตุลา, RTGS: Hetkan Sip-Si Tula, lit. 'October 14 Event'; also วันมหาวิปโยค, RTGS: Wan Maha Wippayok, lit. 'Day of Great Sorrow') was a watershed event in Thailand's history. The uprising resulted in the end of the ruling military dictatorship of anti-communist Thanom Kittikachorn and altered the Thai political system. Notably, it highlighted the growing influence of Thai university students in politics.

== Student activism in Thailand the 1950s–1970s ==
Student activism in Thailand grew during the 1950s, as many students became inspired by leftist ideology to mobilize and organize demonstrations and rallies against the pro-American policies of the ruling government. The rise of university students as a political force was also due to the increase in absolute numbers of university students. From 1961 to 1972, the number of university students increased from 15,000 to 150,000, while the number of universities increased from five to seventeen. Prior to 1968, student activity was confined to demonstrations of loyalty rather than demands for change or criticism of the political system. The death of Sarit Thanarat in December 1963 changed things as the government under Thanom was more tolerant of students and intellectuals. The publication of the Social Science Review in the 1960s was credited as being responsible for restarting intellectual thinking and debate in Thai politics. Discussion groups sprang up at major universities which developed into organized and important independent groups, e.g., the "Sapha Na Dome" and "Sethatham" and the "SOTUS" group. These independent groups in turn produced their own writings and the Social Science Review began to publish articles from them. Some of the writings were critical of the government. These groups also started to hold clandestine political seminars which encouraged students to be analytical and critical.

== The National Student Center of Thailand ==
The student discussion groups were in many important ways different from the student unions already present on campus. They were radical and looked for new ways of interpreting Thai society and politics, often with a leftist slant. They did not organize themselves the same way the official student unions were run, i.e., on a hierarchical and politically conservative basis. These groups from different universities were able to transcend inter-university rivalry and build up contacts among themselves. Development programs, based on those of the United States Peace Corps, took students from various campuses to work in rural areas during their vacations and forced them to recognize the problems in the countryside. The programs also served to show the students how inadequate their university training had been, as they were not able to use any of their knowledge to improve the conditions which the majority of the rural population faced.

As a consequence of the increasing collegial contact between students, the National Student Center of Thailand (NSCT) was founded in 1968. Its purpose was to represent and coordinate student action. The NSCT was to play a crucial role in the 1973 uprising. After several meetings between representatives from Thailand's universities, it was proposed that Thai students should have an inter-university organization, the NSCT. It was to include two members from each of eleven institutions: Chulalongkorn University, Thammasat University, Kasetsart University, Silpakorn University, Mahidol University, Chiang Mai University, Khon Kaen University, Prince of Songkla University, Prasanmit Teachers College (now Srinakharinwirot University), Bangsaen Teachers College (now Burapha University), and Patumwan Teachers College (now combined with Srinakharinwirot University).

In its early years, the NSCT was not particularly active, and did not organize any political activities. For example, the NSCT was not involved during the demonstrations against internal corruption at Chulalongkorn University in September 1970. Instead, it concentrated on areas such as community services, counseling new students, and producing a television show which praised the King, Bhumibol Adulyadej. This conservative, royalist outlook can be traced to the organization of the NSCT and the manner in which people were elected officers. The NSCT consisted of three committees composed of the presidents of the student unions, who were responsible for formulating NSCT policy and selecting the leaders of the divisions in the secretariat committee. This made it difficult for members of the more politically conscious groups to control or even influence the NSCT, as they were still viewed with suspicion by most students. As a result, activists were unable to win election to the campus student unions and thus to the NSCT. Many discussion groups found the NSCT to be conservative and unprogressive.

Under the leadership of student activist Thirayuth Boonmee (in black), the National Student Center of Thailand protested for a revision of the constitution. Thirayuth was arrested, which led to further protests.

This changed in 1972 when Thirayuth Boonmee, an engineering student from Chulalongkorn University, became secretary-general of the NSCT. He began the political activism of the NSCT. He was prudent in choosing issues to campaign against, allowing the NSCT time to mobilize and maintain political momentum.

Despite the apparent unity of the student movement, there were noticeable splits among the students. While they were united in their aim to remove Prime Minister Field Marshal Thanom Kittikachorn and his clique from office, once Thanom went into exile the student movement split into two main factions: the moderate university students and the radical vocational students. The vocational students were marked by their propensity for violence and their demands for the right to study for degrees. Likewise, the NSCT was divided between two personalities, Sombat Thamrongthanyawongse and Seksan Prasertkul. Some scholars link this conflict to the traditional Thai personal clique power competition typical of Thai bureaucracy. However, others cite the cooperation between Seksan and Sombat in protesting the construction of a second international airport for Bangkok as evidence that it was possible for them to cooperate.

== NSCT actions leading to October 1973 ==
In November 1972, the NSCT began a campaign to boycott Japanese goods. This was a strategic move as it avoided a direct attack on the Thanom government, but served to show the public the students' intentions. As well as handing out leaflets in shopping centers, proclaiming an "Anti-Japanese Goods Week" and presenting a ten-point economic plan to Thanom, the NSCT also organized a protest march. It was difficult for the Thanom government to crack down on the NSCT despite the ban on other political parties as the NSCT played up nationalistic sentiment.

With the success of the anti-Japanese goods campaign, the NSCT took a more obvious stance in December 1972 by responding to the government's National Executive Council Decree No. 299, which enabled the council to place the judiciary under direct bureaucratic control. This increased its powers vis-à-vis the judiciary. The NSCT organized an all-night sit-in at Thammasat University and a march from there to Chulalongkorn University. A protest rally was also held at Chiang Mai University. The NSCT was supported by the Lawyers Association of Thailand and by some members of the media. Three days later, the government backed down and retracted the decree.

In June 1973, several university students from Ramkhamhaeng University were expelled for publishing a satire on the ruling government. The satire was related to the Thung Yai hunting scandal that took place in April 1973, when a military helicopter crashed with the loss of senior military officers, family members, wealthy businessmen, and a film star. The death of the highly popular film star, as well as of the prominent businessmen, could not be covered up. The satire made public some of the details, arousing nationwide public outrage. These activities were exposed at a time when the government extended the terms of office of Thanom and his deputy Praphas Charusathien for another year. The NSCT reacted by organizing rallies to call for the reinstatement of the students. Subsequently, the government decided to close the universities, which caused the rallies to grow in size, reaching 50,000. Eventually, the government relented in the end, with the students reinstated and the rector of the university forced to resign.

Through these actions, the NSCT gained a reputation for being on the side of the people, helping to turn middle-class opinion against the military government. The NSCT also learned to organize effective rallies and demonstrations, showing their growing experience and resourcefulness as logisticians. By October 1973, they had earned themselves a political voice and, emboldened by their previous successes, took decisive action.

== Events of 6–15 October 1973 ==
The army opened fire on the students, forcing them to duck for cover

On 6 October, Thirayuth Boonmee and ten other political activists were arrested for distributing leaflets in crowded places in Bangkok such as Bang Lamphu, Siam Square, and Pratunam, urging support for an early drafting of the constitution. The ruling government used a decree banning gatherings of more than five people to arrest them. The other arrestees were Thirayuth, Prapansak Kamolpetch, Boonsong Chalethorn, Bandhit Hengnilrat, Visa Kanthap, Thanya Chunkathatharn, Thawee Muenthikorn, Montri Juengsirinarak, Nopporn Suwanpanich, Preedi Boonsue, and Chaiwat Suravichai. They were taken to police headquarters and their homes were searched.

On 7 October, Kongkiat Kongka, accused of being a member of a group advocating early promulgation of the permanent constitution, was also arrested.

On 8 October, the twelve arrestees were denied bail and were also accused by Deputy Prime Minister Praphas Charusathien of being linked to a plot to overthrow the government.

On 9 October, more than 2,000 students from Thammasat University demonstrated at an anti-government rally. After the rally, the students held an all-night vigil, at which they were joined by students from Chulalongkorn University and several teacher training colleges. Khaisaeng Suksai, a former member of parliament, was also arrested, bringing the total number of those in custody to thirteen.

On 10 October, rallies in Bangkok swelled as more students from other student organizations joined the protests. The government prepared to react by quietly setting up a crisis control center with Praphas Charusathien as its director.

On 11 October, Praphas agreed to meet with the students, who demanded the release of the 13 prisoners. He refused to meet their demands. By this time, the rally had moved to the grounds of Thammasat University to accommodate its growing size, with the number of protesters now reaching 50,000.

On 12 October, the government announced that it would release the thirteen prisoners on bail, but the students rejected the offer, stating that they would only accept the unconditional release of the prisoners. Money was contributed by members of the public to support the protest.

On 13 October, the crowd, which had swelled to more than 400,000 (including many members of the public), marched to Democracy Monument to demand the release of the prisoners. The government quickly agreed to the demands and promised that the permanent constitution would be in place by October 1974. With their demands met, the students agreed to go back to their universities. About 200,000 students refused to disband, however, and their leader, Seksan Prasertkul, decided to lead them to the palace to seek advice from King Bhumibol.

On 14 October, the students reached the palace and were met by the king's representative, who said that Bhumibol requested that the students disband. The students agreed to do so, and the assistant director of the police ordered barricades placed to disperse the students in an orderly, single direction. The large size of the crowd meant that many were not able to leave, but the police refused their request for another exit, which resulted in resentment among the students. It is not clear how it happened, but reports soon were heard about violence against the students as the crowd became restive. Early in the morning, bombs exploded near the royal palace and the police began attacking the students.

By late morning, there were acts of vandalism and violence by both sides as the situation spun out of control. The government brought in tanks, helicopters, and infantrymen to support the police. Seventy-seven deaths and 857 injuries resulted and many buildings near Ratchadamnoen Avenue were set on fire. The number of demonstrators quickly grew to more than 500,000, as other students and their sympathizers rallied to their defense. The soldiers finally withdrew in the evening, and about 19:15 the king announced on television and radio that Thanom's military government had resigned.

Violence continued on 15 October around the police headquarters, with students demanding that Thanom be removed as head of the armed forces. Only when it was announced that Thanom, Praphas, and Thanom's son, Colonel Narong Kittikachorn, who was married to Praphas' daughter, had fled the country did calm return to Bangkok. The end had come as quickly and unexpectedly as the violence had begun.

== Aftermath ==
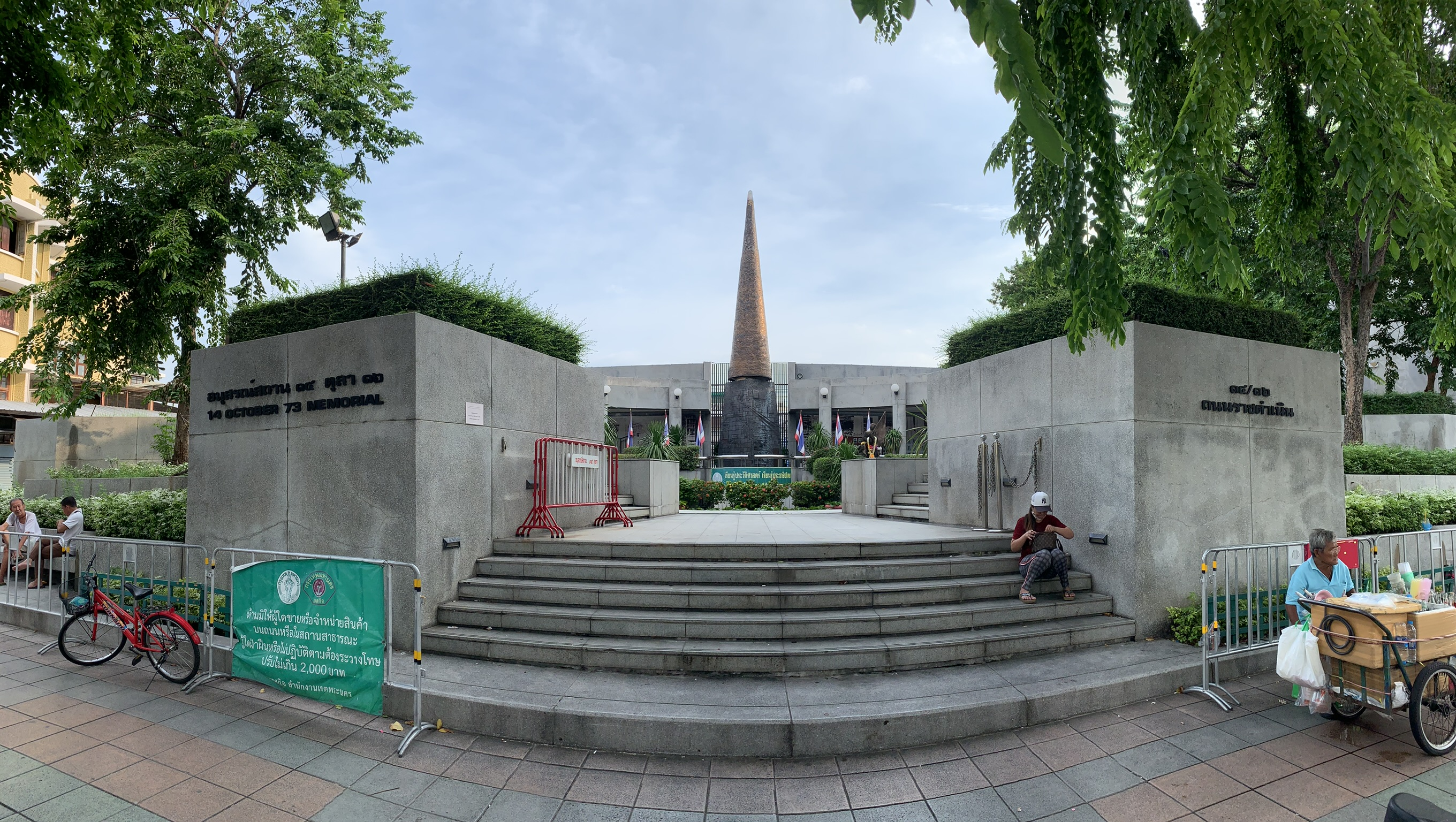
14 October 1973 Memorial on Ratchadamnoen Avenue

The uprising unleashed a range of political forces not seen in Thailand before, and the country gradually became more polarized. In the immediate aftermath of the uprising, there was a popular perception of promise and euphoria. However, things took a turn for the worse, as democracy took the blame for the consequences of the past dictatorships. There were a myriad of reasons for the widespread support for the students. For a majority of the people, the military government was a main reason to support the students because it failed to curb inflation and prevent rice shortages. Benedict Anderson, a Southeast Asia scholar, has argued that despite the power and credibility they lent to the movement, the Thai middle class were far less concerned about the students' goals than they were dissatisfied with social and economic changes affecting their lives.

The NSCT decided to use the donations they had gathered during October 1973 to educate villagers about democracy and its processes. The Democracy Propagation Program began in earnest over the few months after the new regime was installed and "democracy emissaries" were sent to all 580 districts in Thailand. This lasted till 1974, when the realities of the difference in culture, resistance, and inertia forced the program to a halt. Student dissidence continued to emerge with grievances ranging from educational reform to Thailand's trade imbalance with Japan to the CIA's influence over the Thai military establishment. Strikes and sit-ins began in November 1973 and disrupted both businesses and private lives. The atmosphere of chaos continued as reports streamed from the northeast about the country's communist insurgency.

The lack of strong leadership in the interim government meant there was little break from the past. Even under the new constitution and after the general elections, the deputies approached their legislative duties with caution, voting conservatively and rejecting any legislation that might threaten the entrenched and wealthy upper class. Furthermore, the new civilian leadership feared offending the military and would not curb the privileges of powerful officers. In the years after the uprising, riots and strikes took place with higher frequency and insurgency in the hills seemed commonplace while taxes rose. Electric power was intermittent and Bangkok at night was sometimes darkened. This was made worse as the international situation in Indochina deteriorated. Vietnam, Laos and Cambodia all fell to communist forces in 1975, and the threat of communist groups in neighboring countries led to panic among the Thai people. The presence of communist regimes on Thai borders, the abolition of the 600 year-old Lao monarchy, and the arrival of a flood of refugees from Laos and Cambodia swung public opinion in Thailand to the right, resulting in conservatives gaining far more support in the 1976 elections than they had the previous year. This right-wing shift would culminate in the 6 October 1976 massacre of student protesters at Thammasat University, which marked the end of the "democratic period".

== Analysis ==
The uprising was undoubtedly driven by the actions of the university students, but the role of other forces should also be mentioned. These include armed forces rivalries, especially between the army and the navy, and a series of wildcat strikes by common labourers and civilian workers in August and September 1973, both of which helped to create an atmosphere conducive to a change in the ruling government.

While the uprising did not change the role of the monarch, it did emphasize his position as a final arbiter between opposing forces. On 14 October, King Bhumibol appointed the Thammasat chancellor and dean of the faculty of law, former Supreme Court Judge Sanya Dharmasakti, as prime minister by royal command. This established a precedent subsequently exercised only three times, of appointing Prime Ministers of Thailand. On 22 May 1974, Dr Sanya appointed a commission to draft a new constitution, and on 27 May tendered his resignation. A House of Representatives resolution called on him to serve a second consecutive term. In December 1973, the king appointed a 2,346-member National General Assembly that elected a new 299-member National Legislative Assembly to replace the old one. The king has remained a key reference point for the Thai people ever since.

The role of the Communist Party of Thailand (CPT) within the student movement is unusual as it had no visible influence on the events in October 1973. The CPT also failed to incorporate the students into their struggle for a number of reasons. First, the nature of the students prevented their recruitment. The majority of the university students were from middle-class or lower-middle-class backgrounds and had enrolled in universities in hopes of finding work in the government bureaucracy. Further, Gawin Chutima, an ex-communist, argues that students were firmly locked into the Sakdina ideology and were subordinate and obedient to older and socially superior persons. In addition, the CPT pursued a strict Maoist line, which called for revolution to take place in rural areas first. The CPT did not consider students the vanguard of a Marxist revolution. They saw the students as weak-minded and undisciplined, a view that did not change even after the crackdown in October 1976. Nevertheless, after the events of October 1973, the CPT began recruiting in the universities by publishing books and writing articles on campus. This was most evident in an article on the NSCT newspaper which called for armed struggle as the only way to change society for the better.

The toppling of the regime by the student movement ushered in a period (1973–1976) in Thai politics termed "democratic". However, in hindsight the period was not democratic in most senses of the word. The strong resurgence of the right wing and the military in late-1974 began a program of politically motivated assassinations of prominent peasant, farmer, and student leaders. Ironically, after the end of the Thanom regime, the political repression that forced radical students to toe the NSCT line also dissipated. This led to the breakup of the student movement into disparate parts.

== In popular culture ==
=== Film ===
- The Moonhunter (2001) written by Seksan Prasertkul himself, a student leader of the uprising.

== See also ==
- 1970s peasant revolts in Thailand
- Counterculture of the 1960s
- 6 October 1976 massacre
- Marxism and religion
- 2020–2021 Thai protests
- Tak Bai incident
