= Thirayuth Boonmee =

Thai academic

Thirayuth Boonmee (Thai: ธีรยุทธ บุญมี, RTGS: Thirayut Bunmi; born 10 January 1950) is a Thai social scientist, public intellectual and a former student activist.

== Student leader ==
While a student at Chulalongkorn University in 1973, Thirayuth led the National Student Center of Thailand (NSCT) in coordinating political activism against the military dictatorship of Thanom Kittikachorn and Praphas Charusathien. The NSCT led tens of thousands in public protests against the regime. One of the earlier activities of the NSCT had been a 10-day boycott against Japanese products, in protest against Japanese investments in Thailand.

On 6 October 1973, Thirayuth and 12 other student activists were arrested by the Praphas government for sedition after they distributed leaflets demanding a new constitution. Rumors spread that they had been killed, which sparked massive anti-government protests. The demonstrations reached their peak on 13 October, when about 400,000 protesters gathered in front of the Democracy Monument and the parliament building. That afternoon, Thirayuth and the other students were released, and the king approved plans to draft a new constitution within 12 months.

Thirayuth also played a role in exposing the Internal Security Operations Command's role in a massacre of villagers at Ban Na Sai village in the northeast. After the student massacre at Thammasat University on 6 October 1976, Thirayuth, as well as many other students and intellectuals fled from the cities to take refuge with the Communist Party of Thailand (CPT) in its jungle strongholds. Thirayuth increasingly became critical of the king, noting in a broadcast on 1 April 1977 that the monarchy was "obsolete and deteriorating", and that "I think that if our people were to destroy it, there would be no adverse effects". After the CPT dissolved itself in the early-1980s, Thirayuth returned to the mainstream of Thai intellectual life, renouncing socialism and rejecting his anti-monarchical statements.

== Academic career ==
Thirayuth went to the Netherlands to study Philosophy, Sociology and Anthropology at the International Institute of Social Studies in The Hague and University of Nijmegen, earning a doctorandus degree (M.A. equivalent). In 1985 returned to Thailand. For many years he has taught in the Faculty of Sociology and Anthropology of Thammasat University. In 1997, he was named one of Thailand's ten most influential public intellectuals. In 2008, Thirayuth became director of the Sanya Dharmasakti Institute for Democracy at Thammasat University. In 2012 he was appointed Professor of Anthropology. In 2015, he moved to Thammasat University's College of Interdisciplinary Studies.

Thirayuth was an outspoken critic of prime minister Thaksin Shinawatra (2001–2006), for whose rule he coined the term "Thaksinocracy".
