= Boonsong Chalethorn =

Thai academic and politician

Boonsong Chalethorn (Thai: บุญส่ง ชเลธร, RTGS: Bunsong Chalethon; born circa 1953) is a Thai academic and politician, best known for being one of the student leaders in protesting the junta government and calling for the constitution, known as the "Oct 14 Event" in 1973.

At just 20 years old, Chalethorn was one of 13 students and academics who were arrested by the police on October 6, 1973 at Pratunam for distributing leaflets calling for the constitution from Field Marshal Thanom Kittikachorn's government. All 13 of them were collectively referred to as "13 rebels of the Constitution".

Nearly 50 years after the event, he revealed that what society has always known about the start of the violence is not true. "It's all lies" he said. Chalethorn revealed that in the early hours of Sunday October 14, 1973, hundreds of thousands of demonstrators confronted riot police, but there was no clashes or violence of any kind, there was only shouting and joking sentences. Until the protesters disperse to return home, but the police did not allow them to pass at the intersection where Ratchawithi cuts across Rama V roads outside Chitralada Royal Villa, the resident of King Bhumibol Adulyadej (Rama IX) and members of the royal family. He was asked to speak on the roof of a police van to calm the protesters. As he was speaking, a police car with a siren suddenly ran and parked behind him. As soon as the siren stops, the police began to use violence by beating demonstrators and firing tear gas until it escalated into a bloody event in Thai history. In all, the protesters were not the ones who first initiated violence against the officers.

Three years later, after the events of October 6, 1976, he fled into the forest to join the Communist Party of Thailand (CPT). He has left Thailand to live in several European countries including the United States especially Sweden where he lived for decades. Chalethorn studied the Swedish welfare state to become an expert.

In 2009, he returned to Thailand and became a member of a New Politics Party (NPP) with Somsak Kosaisuuk, one of the leaders of the People's Alliance for Democracy (PAD) or the Yellow Shirts as the head. On August 29, 2010, he ran for election as a member of the Bangkok Metropolitan Administration Council (BMC), Bueng Kum constituency, but was not elected.

He is currently a political science professor at Rangsit University (RSU) and one of the founders of the Sang Anakot Thai Party (Building Thailand's Future Party), which has two former ministers in the government of Gen Prayut Chan-o-cha as leaders, Sontirat Sontijirawong and Uttama Savanayana. He served as the deputy secretary-general of the party.

In addition, he was also the first generation member of the Youth Democrat, a political group founded by the Democrat Party in 1969, whose members were all young people.

== See also ==
- 1973 Thai popular uprising
