= Air Battle over Lampang =

1944 WWII battle in Thailand

Coordinates: 18.3024°N 99.5483°E

- Part of Pacific War (World War II)
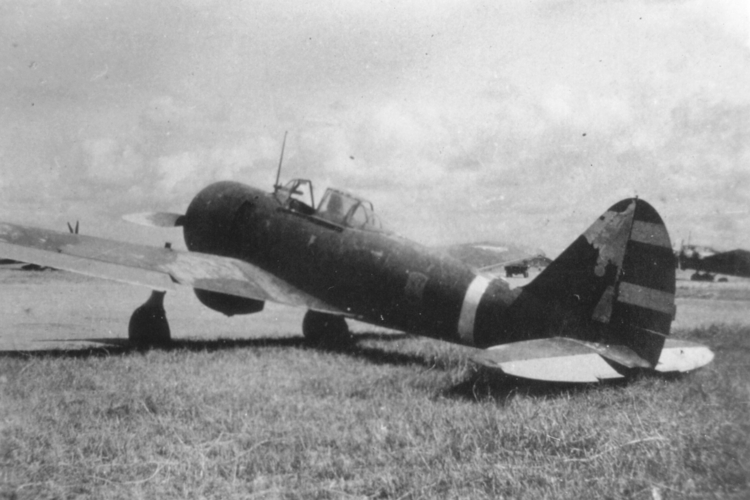
- Nakajima Ki-27 Otsu of the Royal Thai Air Force
| Date | 11 November 1944 |
| Location | Near Lampang Airfield, Lampang Province, Thailand |
| Result | 4 Thai aircraft shot down and 1 US aircraft shot down |

Belligerents
| United States | Thailand |

Commanders and leaders
| John C. Habecker; Roger R. Vadenais; Dale D. Desper; Richard D. Conway | Kamrop Plengkham; Chuladit Detkunchorn; Chalermkiat Watanangura; Waat Suntornkomol (DOW); Thada Biaokhaimuk |

Units involved
| Fourteenth Air Force; 51st Fighter Group; 449th Fighter Squadron; 25th Fighter Squadron | (Thailand) Phayap Region Combined Air Wing; 85th Composite Wing; 16th Fighter Squadron |

Strength
| 7 P-38J Lightning; 9 P-51C Mustang | 5 Ki-27b Nate (บ.ข.๑๒) |

Casualties and losses
| 1 P-51C Mustang shot down with 1 pilot killed. Thai claim 4 P-51C Mustangs shot down. | 4 Ki-27b lost, 1 pilot killed. |

The Air Battle over Lampang (Thai: ยุทธเวหาลำปาง, ยุทธเวหา 5 ต่อ 16 เหนือนครลำปาง) was an air-to-air combat between the Royal Thai Air Force (RTAF) and the United States Army Air Force (USAAF) on 11 November 1944 during the Second World War. The engagement took place near Lampang Airfield in northern Thailand, which was used by Thai and Japanese forces as a strategic air base during the war.

== Background ==
Lampang Airfield was established on 7 November 1923. It was later operated by the Royal Thai Air Force (RTAF). In March 1940, the United States Department of War listed Lampang Airfield as a military landing ground.

Following Japan's invasion of Thailand in 1941, Lampang Airfield was occupied and used by the Imperial Japanese Army Air Force (IJAAF). The airfield became part of the Lampang Airfield Complex, serving as a strategic node in the network supporting Japanese military operations in northern Thailand and Burma. Throughout the war, the airfield was subjected to Allied air attacks.

In 1944, during Allied reconnaissance and bombing missions over Thailand, the Royal Thai Air Force (RTAF) began deploying aircraft to intercept Allied planes. These air-to-air combats later became known as the Air Battle Over Lampang.

== Air battle ==
On 11 November 1944, at 09:15 (GMT+8), the 51st Fighter Group of the USAAF sent eight P-38J Lightning from the 449th Fighter Squadron and nine P-51C Mustang from the 25th Fighter Squadron taking off from Yunnanyi Airfield bound for northern Thailand. Their mission was an offensive reconnaissance mission along the railway line between Chiang Mai and the Ban Dara bridge. Shortly after takeoff, P-38 Lightning aircraft number 327, flown by 1st Lieutenant Russell Robertson, experienced engine failure and was forced to abort the mission and return to base. This reduced the formation to 16 aircraft that continued on with the mission.

Flight 1 (P-51C) was assigned to fly at low altitude and conduct offensive reconnaissance.

- Flight leader: Lt Col John C. Habecker
- No 2: 2Lt Cardin
- No 3: Capt Meadows
- No 4: Capt Taboor

Flight 2 (P-51C) was assigned to fly at medium altitude and perform escort missions.

- Flight leader: 1Lt Roger R. Vadenais
- No 2: 2Lt Henry Francis Minco
- No 3: 1Lt Otto C. Miller
- No 4: 1Lt Raubinger

Flight 3 (P-38J; No 4 is P-51C) was assigned to fly at high altitude and perform escort missions.

- Flight leader: Capt Dale D. Desper
- No 2: 2Lt Leonard W. flomer
- No 3: 1Lt Frederick A. Roll, Jr.
- No 4: 1Lt Clell H. Mckinney

Flight 4 (P-38J) was assigned to fly at high altitude and perform escort missions.

- Flight leader: 1Lt Richard D. Conway
- No 2: 2Lt Joseph N. Fodor
- No 3: 1Lt Grover W. Stubby
- No 4: 1Lt Robert H. Jones

At 11:15-12:10 (GMT+7), Squadron 41 (ฝูงบินขับไล่ที่ 41) of the 80th Composite Wing (กองบินน้อยผสมที่ 80) scrambled five Curtiss Hawk III fighters in an attempt to intercept the enemy formation. However, the interception failed, as the Allied aircraft were flying at an extremely high altitude, beyond the operational ceiling of the Hawk III fighters.

At 11:30 (GMT+7), the 85th Composite Wing (กองบินน้อยผสมที่ 85) received intelligence about the incoming USAAF formation and scrambled two Ki-27b fighters from Squadron 16 (ฝูงบินขับไล่ที่ 16). The two RTAF pilots, led by Pilot Officer Kamrop Plengkham and Flight Sergeant Third Class Chuladit Detkunchorn, flew to Phan District and Muang Ngao District. However, they did not find any Allied aircraft and returned to base.

At 12:11-12:31 (GMT+7), the allied aircraft arrived at Lampang Airfield. The Royal Thai Air Force (RTAF) scrambled three Ki-27b aircraft from Squadron 16, led by Squadron Leader Chalermkiat Watanangura , Acting Pilot Officer Waat Suntornkomol, and Flight Sergeant Third Class Thada Biaokhaimuk to intercept. During the engagement between Flight 3 and Squadron Leader Chalermkiat in a head-on attack, both sides exchanged fire at an altitude of 15,000 feet. Gunfire from Squadron Leader Chalermkiat's aircraft struck the right-wing fuel tank of 2nd Lieutenant Folmer's plane, causing it to catch fire. He was forced to break off from combat, with Capt Dale D. Desper escorting him as his wingman back to Yunnanyi Airfield.

Meanwhile, Squadron Leader Chalermkiat's aircraft sustained damage when enemy fire struck and dislodged the engine cowling, damaging the engine and forcing him to make an emergency landing at Lampang Airfield. Squadron Leader Chalermkiat was wounded by gunfire that struck his right leg. He was rescued by ground crew members before Allied aircraft flown by Lt Col John C. Habecker strafed his abandoned plane, causing it to explode.

Acting Pilot Officer Waat Suntornkomol's aircraft also was hit during the engagement, and the aircraft caught fire. Acting Pilot Officer Waat Suntornkomol was forced to bail out. He sustained critical burn injuries and was rescued by local civilians and transported to hospital. However, he died from his injuries. Meanwhile, Pilot Officer Kamrop Plengkham and Flight Sergeant Third Class Chuladit Detkunchorn returned from their earlier intercept and joined the air battle. Flight Sergeant Third Class Chuladit Detkunchorn was hit in the right wing. He tried to land at Lampang Airfield but failed, as his plane flipped over. He was injured but survived. Flight Sergeant Third Class Thada Biaokhaimuk was hit in the engine and landed safely in a rice field. The last pilot was Pilot Officer Kamrop Plengkham, who was chased by a P-51 flown by Lt Henry Minco. Kamrop lured the enemy to fly low because the P-51 is a high speed plane. Henry flew past the Ki-27b to avoid hitting the mountain. As Lt Minco pulled up, the P-51 entered Kamrop's Gunsight. Kamrop fired, hitting the P-51, causing it to crash into the mountain.

== Aftermath ==
After this battle, the Ki-27b flown by Pilot Officer Kamrop Plengkham was also damaged, and he attempted to land at Lampang Airfield. However, he saw a P-38J flying near the Airfield, so he decided to land at Koh Kha Airfield instead.

Waat Suntornkomol

For their actions during the battle, Acting Pilot Officer Waat Suntornkomol, Flight Sergeant Thada Biaokhaimuk, and Flight Sergeant Third Class Chuladit Detkunchorn received the Bravery Medal. Flight Lieutenant Chalermkiat Watanangura and Pilot Officer Kamrop Plengkham received the Chaiyaphruek Cluster attached to the ribbon of the Bravery Medal.
