= Lampang (disambiguation) =

Lampang may refer to these places in Thailand:

- the town Lampang
- Lampang Province
- Mueang Lampang district
- Lampang Airport
