= Thaksinocracy =

Thai derogatory political term

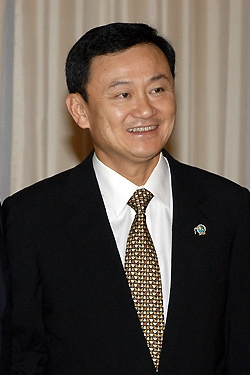
Thaksin Shinawatra in 2003

Thaksinocracy (Thai: ระบอบทักษิณ; RTGS: rabop Thaksin) is a political derogatory term in Thailand created by anti-Thaksin activist, Dr Teerayut Bunmee of the Faculty of Sociology and Anthropology, Thammasat University.

In the view of the anti-Thaksin camp (related to the Democratic Party), Thaksinocracy is a portmanteau of the terms "Thaksin" and "democracy".

According to Thaksin critics, Thaksinocracy has the following characteristics:

1. Electoral democracy and "policy corruption"
2. Cronyism and nepotism
3. A double standard and biased judiciary
4. Populism
5. Conflicts of interests
6. Tax evasion

Thaksin supporters, of course see all of this as pure political demagogy, where opposing parties make baseless accusations while engaging in similar practices themselves (it was the judiciary, for example, that removed a Thaksin-related government in 2008, in what came to be known as a "judicial coup").

Tax evasion has been used by Thaksin detractors following Thaksin's sale of his company that was legally free of tax by virtue of laws that were in force long before Thaksin came to power. Thaksin detractors claimed that even if the tax exemption was legal, not paying the tax was immoral.

The term "Thaksinocracy" is used to describe Thaksin's government which, by opponents, was alleged to be full of conflicts of interests, double standards, biases, and corruption.

For the people who support Thaksin Shinawatra, the term "Thaksinocracy" is an insult. They believe that the people who are using it are only "jealous" of the electoral successes of Thaksin compared to his predecessors. For example, in the case of Abhisit Vejjajiva, the leader of Democratic Party who used this term often, Thaksin supporters always tease him with the word "rabob Abhisit" or "system of privilege" (Thai: อภิสิทธิ์ noun privilege; monopoly; exclusive right.) They point out that Abhisit's Democrat Party has not won an election in 20 years.

However, for the People's Alliance for Democracy (PAD), the meaning of rabob Thaksin or Thaksinocracy has a much more complicated meaning and content rather than just an insult word to Thaksin. The PAD and their partners, the Democrat Party, aim to replace Thaksinocracy with a system whereby government leaders are appointed by a select group of "good" people.

One of the PAD's goals when it was formed was to eliminate Thaksinocracy in Thailand.

Professor Kaewsan Atibhodi mentioned in his book “Stop Thaksinocracy” that there are five goals of Thaksinocracy:

1. Amend the constitution
2. Control the institutions
3. Emphasize nationalism and materialism
4. Allow political corruption
5. End peace and justice of Thailand

== See also ==
- Authoritarianism
- Fascism
- Thaksinomics
