= Phra Bat =

Phra Bat พระบาท
- Subdistrict
- Country: Thailand
- Province: Lampang
- District: Mueang Lampang District

Population (2005)
  - Total: 21,838
- Time zone: UTC+7 (ICT)

Phra Bat (Thai: พระบาท) is a village and tambon (subdistrict) of Mueang Lampang District, in Lampang Province, Thailand. In 2005 it had a population of 21,838 people. The tambon contains nine villages.

Lampang Airport is located here.
