= Highest Commander of the Royal Thai Armed Forces =

Commander-in-chief of Thailand

Highest Commander of Royal Thai Armed Forces
- จอมทัพไทย
- Emblem of Thailand

- Royal Standard

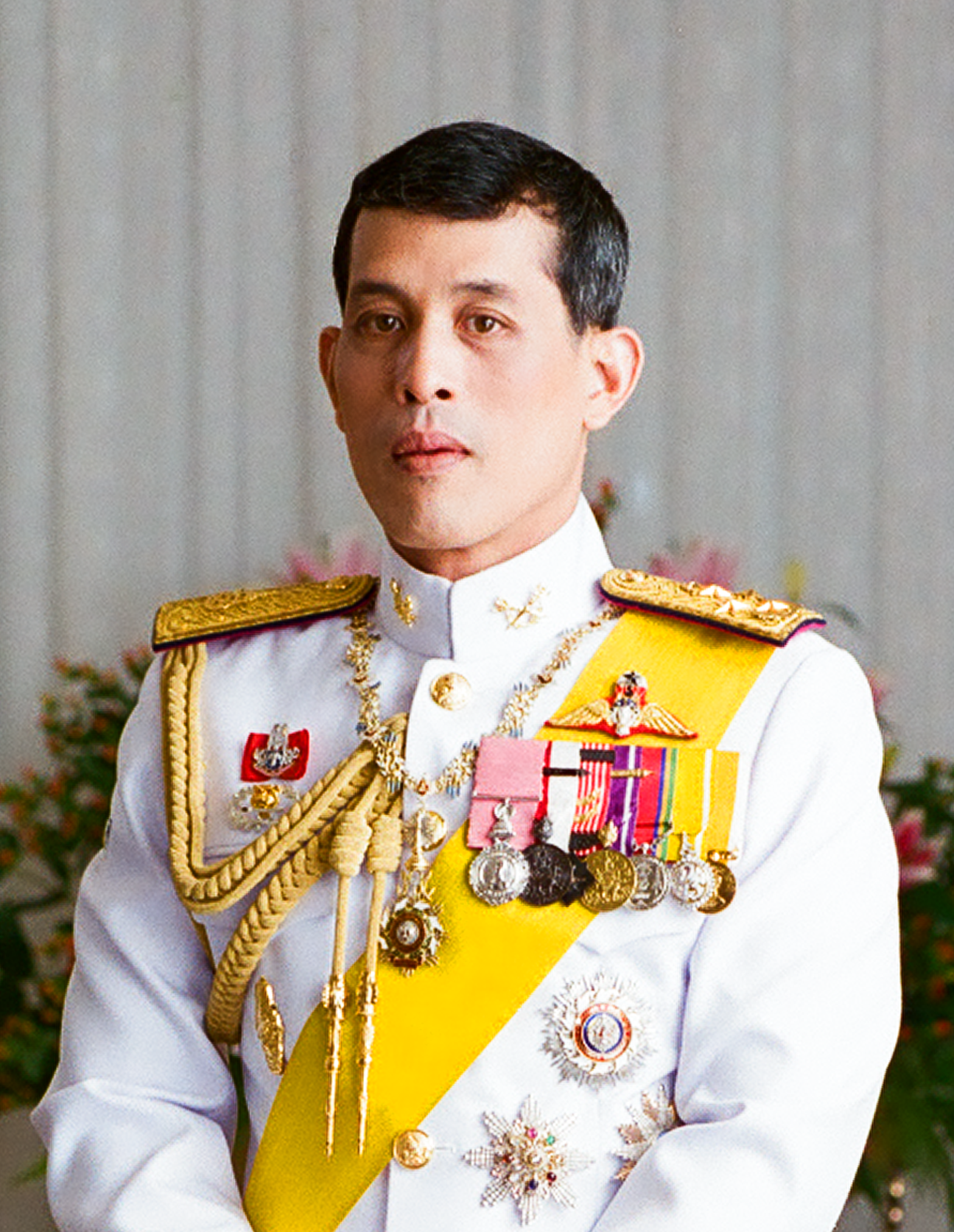
- Incumbent; Vajiralongkorn; King of Thailand since 13 October 2016
- Royal Thai Armed Forces
- Style: His Majesty
- Type: Supreme Commanding Authority
- Status: Commander-in-chief
- First holder: Chulalongkorn
- Website: royaloffice.th

The Highest Commander of the Royal Thai Armed Forces (Thai: จอมทัพไทย; RTGS: Chom Thap Thai) is a position vested in the Thai monarch, who as sovereign and head of state is the commander-in-chief of the Royal Thai Armed Forces.

The position is only nominal. The armed forces are actually managed by the Ministry of Defence, headed by the Minister of Defence (a member of the cabinet) and commanded by the Royal Thai Armed Forces Headquarters, which in turn is headed by the Chief of Defence Forces.

== History ==
Ever since the foundation of the first Thai state, the king has always led his armies into battle. The role of the king as chief warrior was derived from Hindu concepts of kshatriya, and later much influenced by the ideal of a chakravartin as defender of the realm. This martial responsibility has by tradition been borne by every Thai monarch since, but has never been formally instituted. By the 19th century, with the formal creation of a modern Thai army and navy in 1874 and 1887 respectively, the establishment of a formal chain of command was necessary. The titles of Supreme Head of Army (จอมทัพบก; Chom Thap Bok) and Supreme Head of the Navy (จอมทัพเรือ; Chom Thap Ruea) were created around the latter half of the reign of King Chulalongkorn for himself. After the end of the absolute monarchy in 1932, Siam's first permanent constitution established the ceremonial role of Head of the Siamese Armed Forces (จอมทัพสยาม; Chom Thap Sayam) in Article 1, Section 5. Since then Thailand has had 16 constitutions and the title has been enshrined in each of them.

Under the constitutional system, the king's post as head of the armed forces is a means for the monarchy to be closely related to the armed forces. The king participates in military activities and functions, including the presentation of ceremonial colours, based on the national flag, to various units of the armed forces and the presentation of ceremonial swords to all graduating officers of the military academies. The armed forces celebrate the king with an annual parade held on his birthday at the Royal Plaza in central Bangkok.

== Insignia ==
Since 1910, starting with King Vajiravudh, it is customary for representatives of the armed forces to present the newly acceded monarch his insignia as Head of the Armed Forces, at a formal ceremony at the Grand Palace. These include a golden marshal's baton (featuring a Garuda), his shoulder boards, a sabre, and a golden aiguillette to be worn on the right shoulder.

== List ==
Portrait	Name	Reign from	Presentation of Insignia	Reign until	Death
Supreme Head of the Army & Supreme Head of the Navy; Chom Thap Bok & Chom Thap Ruea
	King Chulalongkorn (Rama V)	1 October 1868	16 November 1904	23 October 1910	
	King Vajiravudh (Rama VI)	23 October 1910	2 November 1911	25 November 1925	
Highest Commander of the Royal Siamese Armed Forces; Chom Thap Siam
	King Prajadhipok (Rama VII)	25 November 1925	5 December 1925	2 March 1935 (abdicated)	30 May 1941
Highest Commander of the Royal Thai Armed Forces; Chom Thap Thai
	King Ananda Mahidol (Rama VIII)	2 March 1935	5–7 December 1945	9 June 1946	
	King Bhumibol Adulyadej (Rama IX)	9 June 1946	26 March 1950	13 October 2016	
	King Vajiralongkorn (Rama X)	13 October 2016	3 December 2024	Incumbent	

== See also ==
- Highest military ranks
- Monarchy of Thailand
  - List of Thai monarchs
- Royal Thai Armed Forces
  - Field marshal (Thailand)
  - List of admirals of the fleet (Thailand)
  - List of marshals of the Royal Thai Air Force
- Dai-gensui – Japanese equivalent
- Da yuan shuai – Chinese equivalent
- Taewonsu – Korean equivalent
- Royal Security Command
