= Armando Figueira Trompowsky de Almeida =

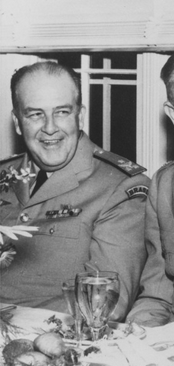
Armando Figueria

Marshal of the Air Armando Figueira Trompowsky de Almeida (30 January 1889 - 16 January 1964) was the first Chief of Staff of the Brazilian Air Force and was Minister of Aviation from 1945 to 1951 for which work he was described as the Consolidator of the Ministry of Aviation.
