= Military ranks of Thailand =

The shoulder insignia and ranks of the Royal Thai Armed Forces.

The military ranks of Thailand are the military insignia used by the Royal Thai Armed Forces. The officer ranks are influenced by the ranks of the United Kingdom and United States, while the non-commissioned ranks are influenced by those of the United Kingdom and France.

The Royal Thai Army rank is a basis for the Royal Thai Police rank. The Royal Thai Navy rank is a basis for the Royal Thai Air Force Rank.

== Rank structure ==
=== Head of the Armed Forces ===
Chom Tap (จอมทัพ) is Head of Forces. There can only be one Chom Thap at a time, and per the Constitution of Thailand, the title is held by the incumbent King of Thailand.

"Chom Tap" is a title, not a rank, so while the title's holder (the King) may dress in the uniform of any service branches, the rank insignia worn is no different from other servicemen.

=== General Classifications and Details ===
Military Ranks can be classified deeper than officer-enlisted, in which there are four tiers of commissioned officers and two for noncommissioned officers. This tiering is consistent across all three service branches, only with different naming scheme.

In semi-formal manners, Commissioned officers (Nai Tahan Sanyabat, นายทหารสัญญาบัตร) are also called Nai Tahan (นายทหาร). Noncommissioned officers (Nai Tahan Pratuan, นายทหารประทวน) are also called Nai Sib (นายสิบ).

Ranks below Chom Pon use Thai alternate numbers. The ranks' name are a combination of the tier name, minus the word Nai (นาย), which means "Master", if any when present, and the numerals.

All Commissioned Officer ranks are granted by royal decree. Commossioned Officers below the General Officer ranks may be issued Waa Ti Yos (ว่าที่ยศ, "Acting Rank"), by the Minister of Defence. Acting rank holders are entitled to the same rights as the rank holders, including the rank insignia and decorations, only pending grant of rank by royal decree.

Commanding Officers with a rank no less than Lieutenant General, or the Minister of Defence, may issue noncommissioned officer ranks.

Dismissal from ranks can only be done by those with the authority to issue them, that is, a royal decree for commissioned officer ranks, and commanding officers (Lieutenant General or higher) for noncommissioned officer ranks.

=== Flag Officers ===
Chom Pon (จอมพล) is the highest rank, and is the only rank in its tier (Chom Pon-tier ranks) across the t. It is the five-star officer rank. In present, it is only worn by the King of Thailand. No officers have been appointed to this rank since 1973. The five-star rank have never existed throughout history of Royal Thai Police.

Directly below Chom Pon-tier is the tier of Nai Pon (นายพล), or General officers. There are four ranks within this tier, ranging from four stars to one star. However, only the top three ranks (General, Lieutenant General, Major General) are currently used, and the one-star rank of Brigadier General (and the equivalent ranks in the Navy and Air Force) is not awarded to any officer. The Royal Thai Police historically had a one-star rank, but has since been abolished.

In present, General officers are only promoted as they are assigned to an office. Acting Ranks are not issued. This practice is consistent throughout the Armed Forces and Police Force.

The tier of Nai Pon is Nai Pon Ruea (นายพลเรือ) in the Navy, Nai PonAkat (นายพลอากาศ) in the Air Force, and Nai Pon Tamruaj (นายพลตำรวจ) in the Police Force.

=== Commissioned Officers ===
Officer ranks below the Nai Pon are Nai Pan (นายพัน) and Nai Roi (นายร้อย) ranks, each tiers with three ranks.

The tier of Nai Pan is Nai Nawa (นายนาวา) in the Navy, Nai Nawa Akat (นายนาวาอากาศ) in the Air Force, and Nai Pan Tamruaj (นายพันตำรวจ) in the Police Force. The tier of Nai Roi is Nai Ruea (นายเรือ) in the Navy, Nai Ruea Akat (นายเรืออากาศ) in the Air Force, and Nai Roi Tamruaj (นายร้อยตำรวจ) in the Police Force.

Officers with the Colonel rank are classified further into regular paygrade and "Special paygrade". This "Special paygrade" is equivalent to the general officer paygrade, Colonels receiving this paygrade are considered senior to regular-paygrade Colonels, and can be identified with a special insignia also worn by General officers. This practice of Special paygrade Colonel is also consistent into the Navy, Air Force and Police Force, however, only the Army and Police branch have special insignia for Special paygrade recipients.

=== Noncommissioned Officers ===
Below the officer ranks are the enlisted ranks. There are two tiers among the enlisted ranks, Ja Nai Sib (จ่านายสิบ) and Nai Sib (นายสิบ), a term also colloquial to NCOs in general. There are also three ranks within each tier.

The tier of Ja Nai Sib is Pan Ja (พันจ่า) in the Navy, and Pan Ja Akat (พันจ่าอากาศ) in the Air Force. The tier of Nai Sib in the Ja (จ่า) in the Navy, Ja Akat (จ่าอากาศ) in the Air Force, and Nai Sib Tamruaj (นายสิบตำรวจ) in the Police Force.

For Sergeant Major First Class, there are two paygrades, the regular paygrade and the special paygrade. The special paygrade SM1 are considered senior to regular paygrade counterpart, and again, this practice is consistent into the Navy and Air Force. The Police Force, however, has a separate rank for the higher paygrade.

Enlisted Private, after completing the term of mandatory conscription, may be temporarily enlisted as a noncommissioned officer, known as สิบตรีกองประจำการ.

=== Private ===
The Private rank name in Thai is consistent across all three service branches, which is Phon Tahan (พลทหาร). It is also the only rank for Private.

It is also possible for the Police Force to enlist conscripts, with the rank Phon Tamruaj (พลตำรวจ), in lieu of mandatory military conscription in Thailand. However, this practice is currently abandoned. Instead, all police personnel are required to go through examinations and attend dedicated training facilities (Royal Thai Police Cadet Academy for Officers, and Training Centers for Enlisted). Upon graduations, graduates are commissioned or enlisted into the Police Force, as Police Second Lieutenant (for officer) or Police Lance Corporal (for Enlisted).

== Commissioned officer ranks ==
The rank insignia of commissioned officers.

Rank group	General / flag officers				Senior officers			Junior officers
Royal Thai Army
Royal Thai Army	จอมพล; Chom phon	พลเอก; Phon ek	พลโท; Phon tho	พลตรี Phon tri	พันเอก; Phan ek	พันโท; Phan tho	พันตรี Phan tri	ร้อยเอก; Roi ek	ร้อยโท; Roi tho	ร้อยตรี Roi tri
Anglicised version	Field marshal	General	Lieutenant general	Major general	Colonel	Lieutenant colonel	Major	Captain	Lieutenant	Second lieutenant
Royal Thai Navy
Royal Thai Navy	จอมพลเรือ; Chom phon ruea	พลเรือเอก; Phon ruea ek	พลเรือโท; Phon ruea tho	พลเรือตรี Phon ruea tri	นาวาเอก; Nawa ek	นาวาโท; Nawa tho	นาวาตรี Nawa tri	เรือเอก; Ruea ek	เรือโท; Ruea tho	เรือตรี Ruea tri
Anglicised version	Admiral of the fleet	Admiral	Vice admiral	Rear admiral	Captain	Commander	Lieutenant commander	Lieutenant	Lieutenant junior grade	Sub lieutenant
Royal Thai Air Force
Royal Thai Air Force	จอมพลอากาศ; Chom phon akat	พลอากาศเอก; Phon akat ek	พลอากาศโท; Phon akat tho	พลอากาศตรี Phon akat tri	นาวาอากาศเอก; Nawa akat ek	นาวาอากาศโท; Nawa akat tho	นาวาอากาศตรี Nawa akat tri	เรืออากาศเอก; Ruea akat ek	เรืออากาศโท; Ruea akat tho	เรืออากาศตรี Ruea akat tri
Anglicised version	Marshal of the Air Force	Air chief marshal	Air marshal	Air vice marshal	Group captain	Wing commander	Squadron leader	Flight lieutenant	Flying officer	Pilot officer
Rank group	General / flag officers				Senior officers			Junior officers

=== Student officer ranks ===
Rank group	Student officer
Royal Thai Navy
Royal Thai Navy	ชั้นปีที่ 5 Chận pī thī̀ 5	ชั้นปีที่ 4 Chận pī thī̀ 4	ชั้นปีที่ 3 Chận pī thī̀ 3	ชั้นปีที่ 2 Chận pī thī̀ 2	ชั้นปีที่ 1 Chận pī thī̀ 1

== Other ranks ==
The rank insignia of non-commissioned officers and enlisted personnel.

Rank group	Senior NCOs				Junior NCOs		Enlisted
Royal Thai Army							No insignia
Royal Thai Army	จ่าสิบเอก; Cha sip ek	จ่าสิบโท; Cha sip tho	จ่าสิบตรี Cha sip tri	สิบเอก; Sip ek	สิบโท; Sip tho	สิบตรี Sip tri	พลทหาร; Phon thahan
Anglicised version	Sergeant major 1st class	Sergeant major 2nd class	Sergeant major 3rd class	Sergeant	Corporal	Lance corporal	Private
Royal Thai Navy							No insignia
Royal Thai Navy	พันจ่าเอก; Phan cha ek	พันจ่าโท; Phan cha tho	พันจ่าตรี Phan cha tri	จ่าเอก; Cha ek	จ่าโท; Cha tho	จ่าตรี Cha tri	พลทหาร; Phon thahan
Anglicised version	Chief petty officer first class	Chief petty officer second class	Chief petty officer third class	Petty officer first class	Petty officer second class	Petty officer third class	Seaman
Royal Thai Air Force							No insignia
Royal Thai Air Force	พันจ่าอากาศเอก; Phan cha akat ek	พันจ่าอากาศโท; Phan cha akat tho	พันจ่าอากาศตรี Phan cha akat tri	จ่าอากาศเอก; Cha akat ek	จ่าอากาศโท; Cha akat tho	จ่าอากาศตรี Cha akat tri	พลทหาร; Phon thahan
Anglicised version	Flight Sergeant first class	Flight Sergeant second class	Flight Sergeant third class	Sergeant	Corporal	Senior Airman	Airman
Rank group	Senior NCOs				Junior NCOs		Enlisted

There is a special rank (Army: Special Sergeant Major 1st Class (Thai: จ่าสิบเอกพิเศษ, romanized: Cha Sip Ek Phiset); navy: Fleet chief petty officer (Thai: พันจ่าเอกพิเศษ, romanized: Phan cha ek phiset); air force: Special flight sergeant 1st class (Thai: พันจ่าอากาศเอกพิเศษ, romanized: Phan cha akat ek phiset)) which is an honorary rank given to senior enlisted members who are deserving of recognition above and beyond that of the highest enlisted rank. There is no difference in the rank insignia worn, and they do not outrank the normal highest enlisted rank, although in a group situation they will normally be assigned control. They receive a higher salary.

== Royal Thai Police ==
The Royal Thai Police (RTP) is sometimes considered as the fourth armed service of Thailand (๔ เหล่าทัพ), but reports directly to the Prime Minister rather than to the Ministry of Defense.

The Royal Thai Police share the same rank system as the Royal Thai Army but the particularities of the police are the star representing the commissioned officer and the crown over the star. The Royal Thai Police uses the eight-pointed silver star and the silver crown with a halo on top, while the Royal Thai Army uses the five-pointed gold star and the gold crown with no halo for its officer shoulder boards.

=== Officers ===
Rank group	General/flag officers			Senior officers			Junior officers
Royal Thai Police
Royal Thai Police	พลตำรวจเอก; Phon Tam Ruad Ek	พลตำรวจโท; Phon Tam Ruad Tho	พลตำรวจตรี Phon Tam Ruad Tri	พันตำรวจเอก; Phan Tam Ruad Ek	พันตำรวจโท; Phan Tam Ruad Tho	พันตำรวจตรี Phan Tam Ruad Tri	ร้อยตำรวจเอก; Roi Tam Ruad Ek	ร้อยตำรวจโท; Roi Tam Ruad Tho	ร้อยตำรวจตรี Roi Tam Ruad Tri	นักเรียนนายร้อยตำรวจ; Nak Rian Nai Roi Tam Ruad
Abbreviation	พล.ต.อ.	พล.ต.ท.	พล.ต.ต.	พ.ต.อ.	พ.ต.ท.	พ.ต.ต.	ร.ต.อ.	ร.ต.ท.	ร.ต.ต.	นักเรียนนายร้อยตำรวจ
Anglicised version	Police General	Police Lieutenant General	Police Major General	Police Colonel	Police Lieutenant Colonel	Police Major	Police Captain	Police Lieutenant	Police 2nd Lieutenant	Police Cadet Officer
UK equivalent Army ranks/Police ranks	General; Commissioner	Lieutenant General; Deputy Commissioner	Major General; Assistant Commissioner	Colonel; Chief Superintendent	Lieutenant Colonel; Divisional Superintendent	Major; Superintendent	Captain; Chief Inspector	Lieutenant; Inspector	Second Lieutenant; Subdivisional Inspector	Officer Cadet

=== Non-Commissioned Officers ===
Rank group	Senior NCOs			Junior NCOs		Enlisted
Royal Thai Police						No insignia
Royal Thai Police	ดาบตำรวจ; Dap Tamruat	จ่าสิบตำรวจ; Cha Sip Tamruat	สิบตำรวจเอก; Sip Tamruat Ek	สิบตำรวจโท; Sip Tamruat Tho	สิบตำรวจตรี Sip Tamruat Tri	พลตำรวจ; Phon Tamruat
English	Police sergeant major	Police Master sergeant	Police sergeant	Police corporal	Police lance corporal	Police constable

== Volunteer Defense Corps (Thailand) ==
The Volunteer Defense Corps (กองอาสารักษาดินแดน; abbreviated VDC) is a Thai paramilitary under the authority of the Department Of Provincial Administration, Ministry of Interior. It was founded in 1954 to provide extra military support to the Royal Thai Armed Forces and to protect local civilians living near Thailand's borders. Its ranks mirror those of both the RTA and the RTP.

Officers

Rank group	General / flag officers	Senior officers			Junior officers
Volunteer Defense Corps
Volunteer Defense Corps	นายกองใหญ่ Nāyk xng h̄ıỵ̀	นายกองเอก; Nāyk xng xek	นายกองโท; Nāyk xng tho	นายกองตรี Nāyk xng trī	นายหมวดเอก; Nāy h̄mwd xek	นายหมวดโท; Nāy h̄mwd tho	นายหมวดตรี Nāy h̄mwd trī
Volunteer Defense Corps	VDC General	VDC Colonel	VDC Lieutenant Colonel	VDC Major	VDC Captain	VDC First Lieutenant	VDC Second Lieutenant

Enlisted

Rank group	Senior NCOs		Junior NCOs		Enlisted
Volunteer Defense Corps
Volunteer Defense Corps	นายหมู่ใหญ่ Nāy h̄mū̀ h̄ıỵ̀	นายหมู่เอก; Nāy h̄mū̀ xek	นายหมู่โท; Nāy h̄mū̀ tho	นายหมู่ตรี Nāy h̄mū̀ trī	สมาชิกเอก; S̄māchik xek	สมาชิกโท; S̄māchik tho	สมาชิกตรี S̄māchik trī	สมาชิก; S̄māchik
Volunteer Defense Corps	VDC Sergeant major	VDC Sergeant	VDC Corporal	VDC Lance corporal	VDC Member 1st class	VDC Member 2nd class	VDC Member 3rd class	VDC Member

== See also ==
- Thai noble titles
