= List of marshals of the Royal Thai Air Force =

Marshal of the Royal Thai Air Force จอมพลอากาศ
- Rank flag

- Rank insignia
- Country: Thailand
- Service branch: Royal Thai Air Force
- Rank group: General officer
- Rank: Five-star rank
- Formation: 1937
- Next higher rank: Head of the Armed Forces
- Next lower rank: Air Chief Marshal
- Equivalent ranks: Field Marshal (RTA); Admiral of the Fleet (RTN)

The Thai rank of Marshal of the Royal Thai Air Force (Thai: จอมพลอากาศ, romanized: Chom-phon a-kat, lit. 'Chief [of the] Air forces') is the most senior rank of the Royal Thai Air Force.

It is equivalent to a Field Marshal (or Chom Phon) in the Royal Thai Army and an Admiral of the Fleet (or Chom Phon Ruea) in the Royal Thai Navy. The rank of Marshal of the RTAF is also equivalent to the British rank of Marshal of the Royal Air Force.

The rank was formally created in 1937, with the formal foundation of the Royal Siamese Air Force. Together with all other ranks of an independent air force.

== List of Marshals of the Royal Thai Air Force ==
No.	Image	Name	Life	Date of Appointment	Notes	Ref.
1		Plaek Phibunsongkhram	1897–1964	1941	Prime Minister of Thailand (1938–1944 and 1948–1957). Held the post of Supreme Commander of the Royal Thai Armed Forces Headquarters. Also received the rank of Field Marshal and Admiral of the Fleet in the same year. Popularly known as Chom Phon Por (Field Marshal Por). Previously held the rank of Major General in the army.	
S1		Bhumibol Adulyadej (Rama IX)	1927–2016	1946	King of Thailand	
2		Fuen Ronnaphagrad Ritthakhanee	1900–1987	1954	Deputy Prime Minister of Thailand (1955–1957). Held the post of Commander of the Royal Thai Air Force (1949–1957). Also served as Ministry of Transport and as Ministry of Public Health under the premiership of Plaek Phibunsongkhram.	
3		Sarit Thanarat	1908–1963	1959	Prime Minister of Thailand (1958–1963). Held the post of Supreme Commander of the Royal Thai Armed Forces Headquarters. Received the rank of Field Marshal in 1956. Later also received the rank of Admiral of the Fleet and Marshal of the Air Force in 1959. Previously held the rank of General in the army, Admiral in navy and Air Chief Marshal in the air force.	
4		Chalermkiat Vatthanangkun	1914–1960	1960	Awarded posthumously by Royal Command. Plane crashed into mountain near Taipei, while on state business as Commander of the Royal Thai Air Force (1957–1960). Previously held the rank of Air Marshal.	
5		Thanom Kittikachorn	1911–2004	1964	Prime Minister of Thailand (January to October 1958 and from 1963 to 1973). Held the post of Supreme Commander of the Royal Thai Armed Forces Headquarters. Also received the rank of Field Marshal and Admiral of the Fleet at the same time. Previously held the rank of General in the army.	
6		Praphas Charusathien	1912–1997	1973	Deputy Prime Minister of Thailand (1958–1958). Also received the rank of Field Marshal and Admiral of the Fleet at the same time. Held the post of Commander-in-chief of the Royal Thai Army. Previously held the rank of General in the army.	
7		Queen Regent Sirikit of Thailand	1932–2025	1992	Consort of King Bhumibol Adulyadej. Also received the rank of Field Marshal and Admiral of the Fleet at the same time. Possibly the only female in history to attain such ranks.	
S2		Vajiralongkorn (Rama X)	1952–present	2016	King of Thailand	

== See also ==
- Military ranks of the Thai armed forces
  - Field marshal (Thailand) (Chom Phon): equivalent rank in the Royal Thai Army
  - Admiral of the fleet (Thailand) (Chom Phon Ruea): equivalent rank in the Royal Thai Navy
- Marshal of the air force
- Head of the Royal Thai Armed Forces
