= List of admirals of the fleet (Thailand) =

Admiral of the Fleet จอมพลเรือ
- Rank flag

- Rank insignia
- Country: Thailand
- Service branch: Royal Thai Navy
- Formation: 1888
- Next higher rank: Head of the Armed Forces
- Next lower rank: Admiral
- Equivalent ranks: Field Marshal (RTA); Marshal of the Air Force (RTAF)

Chom Phon Ruea (Thai: จอมพลเรือ, lit. 'Chief [of the] boat forces') or Admiral of the Fleet is the most senior naval officer rank of the Royal Thai Navy. Today it is only ceremonially held by members of the Thai Royal family. The Royal Thai Army equivalent is known as just Chom Phon and Chom Phon Akat for the Royal Thai Air Force.

The rank was formally created in 1888, together with all other ranks of the military by King Chulalongkorn (Rama V), who wanted to modernize his Armed Forces through western lines.

== List of admirals of the fleet ==
No.	Image	Name	Life	Date of Appointment	Notes	Refs
1		Prince Bhanurangsi Savangwongse	1859–1928	1913	Brother of King Chualongkorn. Held the post of Commander of the Department of Military Operation. Also made Field Marshal of Siam in 1910. Previously held the rank of general in the army.	
2		Prince Paribatra Sukhumbandhu, the Prince of Nakhon Sawan	1881–1944	1917	Brother of King Vajiravudh. Serve as Minister of the Navy (1903–1920) and Minister of the Interior. Also received the rank of Field Marshal in the same year. Previously held the rank of admiral in the navy.	
-		Ananda Mahidol (Rama VIII)	1925-1946	1935	King of Siam/Thailand	
3		Plaek Phibunsongkhram	1897–1964	1941	Prime Minister of Thailand (1938–1944 and from 1948–1957). Held the post of Supreme Commander of the Royal Thai Armed Forces Headquarters. Also received the ranks of Field Marshal and Marshal of the Air Force in the same year. Popularly known as Chom Phon Por (Field marshal Por). Previously held the rank of major general in the army.	
-		Bhumibol Adulyadej (Rama IX)	1927-2016	1946	King of Thailand	
4		Luang Yuthasart Kosol (Prayoon Yuthasastrkosol)	1905–1975	1956	Deputy Prime Minister of Thailand (1957). Held the post of Commander of the Royal Thai Navy from 1951–1957. Also served as Minister of Agriculture and Cooperatives and as Minister of Culture under the premiership of Plaek Phibunsongkhram.	
5		Sarit Thanarat	1908–1963	1959	Prime Minister of Thailand (1958–1963). Held the post of Supreme Commander of the Royal Thai Armed Forces Headquarters. Received the rank of Field Marshal in 1956. Later also receive the ranks of Admiral of the Fleet and Marshal of the Air Force in 1959. Previously held the ranks of general in the army, admiral in navy and air chief marshal in the air force.	
6		Thanom Kittikachorn	1911–2004	1964	Prime Minister of Thailand (January to October 1958 and from 1963–1973). Held the post of Supreme Commander of the Royal Thai Armed Forces Headquarters. Also received the ranks of Field Marshal and Marshal of the Air Force at the same time. Previously held the rank of general in the army.	
7		Praphas Charusathien	1912–1997	1973	Deputy Prime Minister of Thailand (1958–1958). Also received the ranks of Field Marshal and Marshal of the Air Force at the same time. Held the post of Commander-in-chief of the Royal Thai Army. Previously held the rank of general in the army.	
8		Queen Regent Sirikit of Thailand	1932–2025	1992	Consort of King Bhumibol Adulyadej. Also received the ranks of Field Marshal and Marshal of the Air Force at the same time. Possibly the only female in history to attain such ranks.	
9		Prince Mahidol Adulyadej, the Prince of Songkhla	1892–1929	1998	Awarded posthumously by Royal Command. Father of Kings Ananda Mahidol and Bhumibol Adulyadej. Graduated from the Imperial German Naval Academy at Flensburg-Mürwik. Commissioned in 1912, the Prince resigned from the navy in 1914 to pursue a medical career. Previously held the rank of captain in the navy.	
-		Vajiralongkorn (Rama X)	1952—Present	2016	King of Thailand	

== Rank flags ==
Rank flag of a Siamese Admiral of the Fleet
(1910-1936)

Rank flag of a Siamese Admiral of the Fleet
(1936-1956)

Rank flag of a Thai Admiral of the Fleet
(1956-1979)

== See also ==
- Military ranks of the Thai armed forces
  - Field marshal (Thailand) (Chom Phon): equivalent rank in the Royal Thai Army
  - Marshal of the Royal Thai Air Force (Chom Phon Akat): equivalent rank in the Royal Thai Air Force
- Admiral of the fleet
- List of fleet and grand admirals
- Head of the Royal Thai Armed Forces
