= Field marshal (Thailand) =

Military rank in the Royal Thai Army

Field Marshal จอมพล
- Rank flag of a Thai Field Marshal

- Rank insignia of a Thai Field Marshal
- Country: Thailand
- Service branch: Royal Thai Army
- Rank group: General officer
- Rank: Five-star rank
- Formation: 1888
- Next higher rank: Head of the Armed Forces
- Next lower rank: General
- Equivalent ranks: Admiral of the Fleet (RTN); Marshal of the Air Force (RTAF)

The Thai rank of Field Marshal (Thai: จอมพล, romanized: Chom-phon, lit. 'Chief [of the] forces') is the most senior rank of the Royal Thai Army.

The rank was formally created in 1888 together with all other ranks of the military by King Chulalongkorn (Rama V), who wanted to modernize his armed forces along Western lines. There have been 13 appointments to this rank. The rank has not been awarded since 1992 and its abolition has been proposed by the Thai government in 2018. Plaek Phibunsongkhram was the first commoner to hold this rank.

The Royal Thai Navy equivalent is known as Chom Phon Ruea ('Admiral of the Fleet') and Chom Phon Akat ('Marshal of the Royal Thai Air Force') for the Royal Thai Air Force.

== List of field marshals ==
No.	Portrait	Name	Life	Date of appointment	Notes	Refs
1		Prince Bhanurangsi Savangwongse	1859–1928	1910	Brother of King Chualongkorn. Held the post of Commander of the Department of Military Operation. Later he would be made Admiral of the Fleet in 1913. Previously held the rank of general in the army.	
2		Prince Chirapravati Voradej, the Prince of Nakhon Chaisi	1876–1913	1911	Brother of King Vajiravudh. Held the post of Minister of Defence of Siam. Previously held the rank of general in the army.	
3		Prince Chakrabongse Bhuvanath, the Prince of Phitsanulok	1883–1920	1917	Brother of King Vajiravudh. Organised the Siamese Expeditionary Forces to be sent to the Europe during the First World War. Previously held the rank of general in the army.	
4		Chao Phraya Bodindechanuchit (Mom Rajawong Arun Chatrakul)	1856–1921	1917	Held the post of Commander of the Department of Military Operation. Previously held the rank of general in the army.	
5		Prince Paribatra Sukhumbandhu, the Prince of Nakhon Sawan	1881–1944	1917	Brother of King Vajiravudh. Held the post of Siamese Army Chief of Staff. Also received the rank of Admiral of the Fleet in the same year. Previously held the rank of admiral in the navy.	
6		Chao Phraya Surasakmontri (Cherm Saeng-chuto)	1851–1931	1925	Commander of the Siamese forces during the Haw wars (1865–1890). Previously held the rank of lieutenant general in the army.	
-		Ananda Mahidol (Rama VIII)	1925-1946	1935	King of Siam/Thailand	
7		Plaek Phibunsongkhram	1897–1964	1941	Prime Minister of Thailand (1938–1944 and 1948–1957). Held the post of Supreme Commander of the Royal Thai Armed Forces Headquarters. Also received the ranks of Admiral of the Fleet and Marshal of the Air Force at the same time. Popularly known as Chom Phon Por (Field marshal Por). Previously held the rank of major general in the army.	
-		Bhumibol Adulyadej (Rama IX)	1927-2016	1946	King of Thailand	
8		Phin Choonhavan	1891–1973	1953	Deputy Prime Minister of Thailand (1951–1956). Leader of the Coup Group which carried out the coup d'état of 1947. Previously held the rank of general in the army.	
9		Sarit Thanarat	1908–1963	1956	Prime Minister of Thailand (1958–1963). Held the post of Supreme Commander of the Royal Thai Armed Forces Headquarters. Later also receive the ranks of Admiral of the Fleet and Marshal of the Air Force in 1959. Previously held the ranks of general in the army, admiral in navy and air chief marshal in the air force.	
10		Thanom Kittikachorn	1911–2004	1964	Prime Minister of Thailand (January to October 1958 and from 1963 to 1973). Held the post of Supreme Commander of the Royal Thai Armed Forces Headquarters. Also received the ranks of Admiral of the Fleet and Marshal of the Air Force at the same time. Previously held the rank of general in the army.	
11		Kriangkrai Attanand	1913–1972	1972	Awarded posthumously by Royal Command. Helicopter crashed while in action against Communist insurgents in Ratchaburi Province. Previously held the rank of lieutenant general (as commander of the First Army Area). Commanded the Royal Thai Expeditionary Forces during the Korean War.	
12		Praphas Charusathien	1912–1997	1973	Deputy Prime Minister of Thailand (1963–1971). Also received the ranks of Admiral of the Fleet and Marshal of the Air Force at the same time. Held the post of Commander-in-chief of the Royal Thai Army. Previously held the rank of general in the army.	
13		Queen Regent Sirikit of Thailand	1932–2025	1992	Consort of King Bhumibol Adulyadej. Also received the ranks of Admiral of the Fleet and Marshal of the Air Force at the same time. Possibly the only female in history to attain such ranks.	
-		Vajiralongkorn (Rama X)	1952—Present	2016	King of Thailand	

== See also ==
- Military ranks of the Thai armed forces
  - Admiral of the Fleet (Thailand) (Chom Phon Ruea): equivalent rank in the Royal Thai Navy
  - Marshal of the Royal Thai Air Force (Chom Phon Akat): equivalent rank in the Royal Thai Air Force
- Field marshal
- List of field marshals
- Head of the Royal Thai Armed Forces
