= Chalermkiat Watanangura =

Thai air force officer

- เฉลิมเกียรติ วัฒนางกูร
- Born: 15 August 1914
- Died: 14 April 1960 (aged 45)
- Military career
- Allegiance: Thailand
- Branch: Royal Thai Air Force
- Rank: Marshal of the Air Force
- Commands: Commander-in-Chief
- Wars: World War II; Franco-Thai War; Air Battle over Lampang
- Other work: Deputy Minister of Transport; Deputy Minister of Agriculture

Marshal of the Royal Thai Air Force Chalermkiat Watanangura (Thai: เฉลิมเกียรติ วัฒนางกูร, RTGS: Chaloemkiat Watthanangkun; 15 August 1914 – 14 April 1960) was a Thai air force officer and the Commander of the Royal Thai Air Force from 1957 until his death in an aircraft crash in Taipei, Taiwan. He briefly held cabinet level offices in 1957.

Chalermkiat was briefly the Thai Deputy Minister of Transport from 21 March to 10 August 1957. He then took up the post of Deputy Minister of Agriculture, serving from 10 August to 12 September 1957.

In 1960 Chalermkiat, his wife and sixteen other individuals were killed when the Royal Thai Air Force C-54 they were flying in crashed into Mount Wu Tse near Taipei, Taiwan after takeoff. Chalermkiat had been in Taipei attending a meeting of air chiefs from anti-communist governments from around the Pacific.

== Decorations ==
- 1959 - Knight Grand Cordon (Special Class) of The Most Exalted Order of the White Elephant
- 1958 - Knight Grand Cordon (Special Class) of The Most Noble Order of the Crown of Thailand
- 1959 - Knight Commander of the Most Illustrious Order of Chula Chom Klao
- 1944 - Bravery Medal with wreath
- 1941 - Victory Medal - Franco-Thai War
- 1962 - Victory Medal - Pacific War
- 1934 - Safeguarding the Constitution Medal
- 1947 - Chakra Mala Medal
- 1960 - King Rama IX Royal Cypher Medal, 2nd

Military offices
Preceded by Fuen Ronnaphagrad Ritthakhanee	Commander of the Royal Thai Air Force; 1957 – 1960	Succeeded by Bunchu Chantharubeksa
