= Lampang Airfield Complex =

Lampang Airfield Complex
- Lampang province, Northern Thailand.

Site information
- Type: Military airfields
- Controlled by: Imperial Japanese Army
- Condition: Abandoned

Site history
- Built: 1944
- In use: 1944-1945

All landing grounds of Lampang Airfield Complex

Lampang Airfield Complex was a Royal Thai Air Force and Imperial Japanese Army Air Force military installation established in 1944. After the war, most of it has been abandoned. It is located in Lampang province, Northern Thailand.

== History ==
The Imperial Japanese Army (IJA) initiated plans to develop the existing airfields at Lampang and Ko Kha, and also the establishment of two new airfields in Mae Mo and Hang Chat. When completed, the complex would be able to support the plans of the IJA to defending Burma, then to invade India, and finally in the defense of Thailand as well. There were other airfields located in Chiang Mai, Chiang Rai, Phrae, Nan, and Kengtung, which operated subordinate to the Lampang complex. By 1944, an airfield at Hang Chat and Mae Mo was completed, however, no aircraft has been sighted at both airfields. This was caused by Japan's aircraft industry being plundered from Allied air attacks.

== Airfields ==
Lampang and Ko Kha had already existed prior to the war, and Mae Mo and Hang Chat were built later on. The following lists all airfields and their history.

== Lampang ==
Coordinates: 18°16′15″N 99°30′15″E

Lampang Airfield was initially established on 7 November 1923, and later operated as a Royal Thai Air Force base. It operated as the main airfield of the complex. It operated air transportation. In March 1940, the US War Department report listed Lampang Airport as a military landing ground. The airport was operated and maintained by the Royal Thai Air Force. On 7 December 1941, the US Army Air Corps reported Lampang Airport with 2 hangars and a grass runway. On 12 December 1941, Lampang Airport was occupied by Imperial Japanese Army troops. On 22 March 1942, Lampang Airport was being developed into a heavy bomber airfield. In early 1942, Lampang Airport was heavily crowded with IJAAC and RTAF squadrons, totaling 47 aircraft. The squadrons led multiple bombing missions at a Nationalist Chinese 93rd Division military base in Loi Moei, where 11,000 troops were based.

=== Units ===
The following lists the units based in Lampang Airfield.

- 22nd Observation Squadron, 22–27 December 1941, equipped with Vought SBU Corsair
- 32nd Attack Squadron, 22 December 1941 – 18 February 1942, equipped with Curtiss Hawk II Type 9
- 41st Fighter Squadron, 22–27 December 1941, equipped with Curtiss Hawk III Type 10
- 77th Sentai IJAAF, 29 December 1941 – 26 February 1942, equipped with 30 Ki-27 “Nate” fighters
- 10th Hikodan IJAAF (Area Air Force), 29 December 1941 – 28 February 1942, command unit
- 31st Sentai IJAAF, early February – unknown, equipped with 25 Ki-30 “Ann” light bombers
- 11th Bomber Squadron RTAF, late January – at least 27 May 1942, equipped with 11 Ki-30 “Ann” light bombers
- 12th Bomber Squadron RTAF, late January – at least 27 May 1942, equipped with 11 Ki-30 “Ann” light bombers
- 16th Fighter Squadron RTAF, late January – at least 15 March 1942, equipped with 9 Curtiss Hawk 75Ns and later 12 Ki-27s
- 62nd Heavy Bomber Squadron RTAF, late January – at least 27 May 1942, equipped with 9 Ki-21 “Sally” heavy bombers
- 70th Independent Chutai IJAAF, 22 January – 18 March 1942, equipped with 4 Ki-15 “Babs” reconnaissance aircraft
- 51st Independent Chutai IJAAF, 20 March 1942, equipped with 5 Ki-46 “Dinah” and 5 Ki-15 “Babs” reconnaissance aircraft
- 12th Sentai IJAAF, 20 March 1942, equipped with 31 Ki-21-II “Sally” heavy bombers
- 11th Squadron RTAF, 7 January – 26 February 1943, equipped with Ki-30 light bombers, later reconnaissance
- 12th Squadron RTAF, 7 January – 26 February 1943, equipped with Ki-30 light bombers, later reconnaissance
- 16th Squadron RTAF, 7 January – 26 February 1943, equipped with Ki-30 and Ki-21 bombers, later reconnaissance
- 62nd Squadron RTAF, 29 January – 26 February 1943, equipped with Ki-21 bombers
- 61st Squadron RTAF, mid-November 1943 (visiting from Phrae), equipped with Martin 139 bombers
- 55th Squadron RTAF, 14–21 January 1943, equipped with Marauders
- 11th Squadron RTAF, 15–21 January 1943, equipped with light bombers
- 62nd Squadron RTAF, 22 January - 5 February 1943, equipped with bombers
- 16th Squadron RTAF, 1–7 February 1943, equipped with fighters
- 62nd Squadron RTAF, 24–28 January 1944, participated in airfield surveillance
- 22–28 January 1944, 12th Squadron RTAF, participated in construction and defensive operations at the airfield
- 15 May 1944, 16th Squadron RTAF participated in anti-aircraft emplacement operations
- 17 August 1944, 55th Squadron RTAF resumed activities at the airfield during Japanese occupation
- 55th Squadron RTAF, 14–21 January 1943, equipped with Marauders
- 40th Photographic Reconnaissance Squadron USAAF, August 1945, equipped with F-5 Lightnings (variant of P-38)

== Ko Kha ==
Coordinates: 18°11′44″N 99°24′29″E

Ko Kha Airfield initially operated as a Royal Thai Air Force base. In 1937, it served as the headquarters for the Wing 80. On 22 December 1941, the 61st Squadron RTAF was based in Kho Kha equipped with Nakajima Ki-21 heavy bombers. It later moved out in 1943. In October 1943, 10 aircraft shelter accommodations were reported to be built. In October 1943, Ko Kha Airfield began heavy upgrades, including the runway being extended by an additional 150-200 yards. By 30 April 1943, 10 additional aircraft shelters had been built. Throughout the year, no aircraft had been reported to be operating out of the airfield. However, by 31 December 1943, the number of shelters had totaled to 32. By March 1944, the airfield's capacity was readied to occupy an estimate of two squadrons of light bombers. There was also an extensive development of taxiways underway. In November 1943, it was noted that Japan had been focusing on the development of their bases in Thailand with greater attention rather than their positions in Burma. An ammunition ordnance facility, a fuel and oil facility, and a general storage facility had been built. Living accommodations were also constructed. By May 1944, Ko Kha Airfield was reported to be completed with an all-weather airfield, with development efforts ceasing.

=== Post-war ===
In 1945, Ko Kha Airfield was abandoned by the Japanese. No aircraft had been sighted during its Japanese occupation. In the 1950s, the airfield was still operational, however it was listed as closed by 1968.

In 1971, a USAF space track radar was established on the site of the airfield, named Ko Kha Air Station. It consisted of various facilities including a dining hall, radar system, and enlisted men's barracks. The 17th Radar Squadron was stationed. It was closed in 1976, with the radar being dismantled.

The South-half of the old runway has been developed into an industrial park. In 2013, the King Narai Plaza monument was completed on the south end of the former airfield. In 2014, a natural history museum also began construction and was completed in 2015. Nothing significant is left of the former Ko Kha Airfield.

== Hang Chat ==
Coordinates: 18°16′15″N 99°30′15″E

Hang Chat Airfield, also known as Lampang NW, is the Westerly satellite airfield in the Lampang Airfield Complex. Its construction began in August 1944 by the Japanese Army. Upon their arrival, they first hired local Thais to construct huts for them, located in wooded areas isolated from nearby villages. It consisted of a wood framed, roofed with canvas and floods of milled wood. After the completion of the huts, many Thai laborers were recruited to construct the runway. Trees were sawn down by hand, and stumps were burnt and filled. After one year of construction, Hang Chat airfield was finally activated. It consisted of two parallel runways separated by approximately 400 yards (365 m), however the Easterly runway was not serviceable. In October 1944, the Eastern runway was being surfaced, where construction effort would be focused on the runway through 15 December. It consisted of 6 aircraft shelters, and revetment walls begun being installed. As observed by Allied intelligence, Hang Chat Airfield was expected to become operational with aircraft, pilots, and ground personnel. By March 1945, the airfield has 12 surface-rolled aircraft shelters. By 31 May, Hang Chat Airfield was reported to be disused by the Japanese.

=== Post-war ===
After the war, the Japanese left, leaving Hang Chat Airfield abandoned. The runways quickly became overgrown, and were cleared in adjacent areas for farming.The airfield was not depicted in any post-war maps. In 1966, the US Coast Guard established a LORAN transmitted located 4.5 km southwest of the center of the Hang Chat runways to aid navigation during the Vietnam War. This proximity to the former airfield is only mere coincidental.

Additionally, there was a Highway strip bearing the same name, which was first projected in 1973. It was the Hang Chat Highway Strip, which may have never been implemented at all due to the steep grading of the highway.

=== Hang Chat LORAN ===
The LORAN station itself was constructed from June to September 1966 by the United Construction Company, and the tower was supplied by the Chicago Bridge and Iron S/P and Subsistence buildings: H. H. Robinson Co. It consisted of multiple buildings. It was activated on 18 August 1966 and was operated by the USCG. The commissioning commenced with a religious ceremony and military parade. It was deactivated on 17 September 1975.

== Mae Mo ==
Coordinates: 18°24′46″N 99°43′42″E

Mae Mo Airfield was the easterly satellite airfield in the Lampang Airfield Complex. The Imperial Japanese Army Air Force begun the construction of Mae Mo Airfield in April 1944. Portions of thick jungle had to be cleared by engineers. Located North of the airfield was a temporary living accommodation. On 19 June 1944, four 22nd Bombardment Squadron B-25s of the 341st BG took off to attack Kenghluang Railway Tunnel in Thailand. However, they observed Mae Mo Airfield, which was bombed by accident. Numerous reconnaissance missions have been made to photograph the airfield, in which most resulted in failure due to cloudy weather conditions.

In April 1945, Mae Mo Airfield was reported to be disused by the IJAAF. When the war ended, the surrounding forests were cut down. What remained of the runways disappeared into rice fields that now covers the area. There were two bomb craters which are still visible, and one additional bomb which remained unexploded. It was later retrieved by the Thai government.
