= Lampang Airport =

Airport in northern Thailand

Lampang Airport ท่าอากาศยานลำปาง
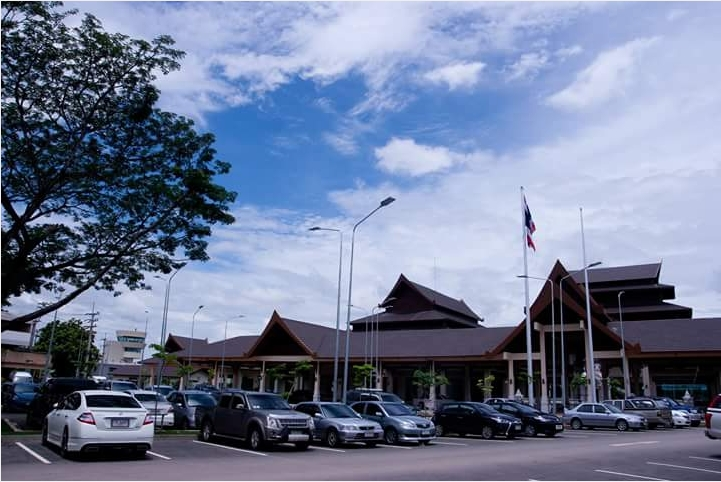
- IATA: LPT; ICAO: VTCL

Summary
- Airport type: Public
- Operator: Department of Airports
- Serves: Lampang
- Location: Tambon Phra Bat, Amphoe Mueang Lampang, Lampang, Thailand
- Opened: 7 November 1923; 102 years ago
- Elevation AMSL: 247 m / 811 ft
- Coordinates: 18°16′15.36″N 99°30′15.00″E
- Website: minisite.airports.go.th/lampang

Maps
- Location of airport in Thailand
- Interactive map of Lampang Airport

Runways
Direction	Length		Surface
Direction	m	ft	Surface
18/36	1,971	6,465	Asphalt

Statistics (2025)
- Passengers: 179,228 ▲18.34%
- Aircraft movements: 1,990 ▲44.46%
- Freight (tonnes): 14.820 ▲149.69%

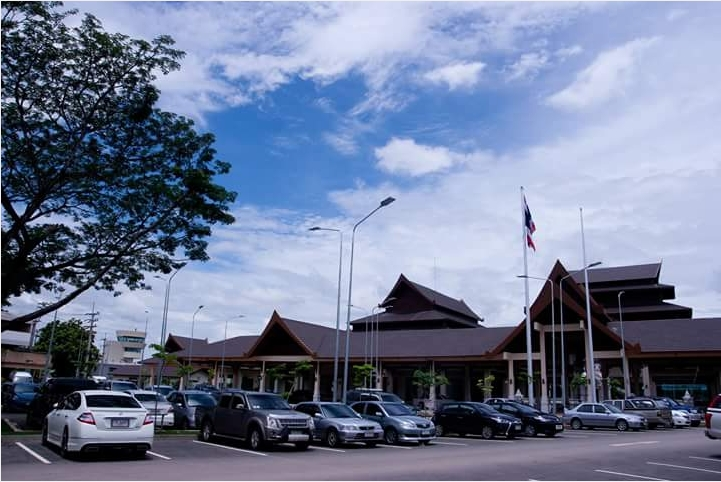
View of new airport terminal.

Lampang Airport (IATA: LPT, ICAO: VTCL) is in Tambon Phra Bat, Amphoe Mueang Lampang, Lampang province in Northern Thailand. During World War II, Lampang Airport became an important station for the Imperial Japanese Army Air Force's bomber squadrons.

== History ==
On 7 November 1923, Lampang Airport was established, and was listed on an air show in February 1924 for touring the Northern regions of Thailand. It operated air transportation.

=== World War II ===
During World War II, it became a part of the Lampang Airfield Complex. In March 1940, the US War Department report listed Lampang Airport as a military landing ground. The airport was operated and maintained by the Royal Thai Air Force. On 7 December 1941, the US Army Air Corps reported Lampang Airport with 2 hangars and a grass runway. On 12 December 1941, Lampang Airport was occupied by Imperial Japanese Army troops. On 22 March 1942, Lampang Airport was being developed into a heavy bomber airfield. In early 1942, Lampang Airport was heavily crowded with IJAAC and RTAF squadrons, totaling 47 aircraft. The squadrons led multiple bombing missions at a Nationalist Chinese 93rd Division military base in Loi Moei, where 11,000 troops were based.

=== Units ===
- 41st Fighter Squadron, 22–27 December 1941, equipped with Curtiss Hawk IIIs.
- 32nd Attack Squadron, 22 December 1941 - 18 February 1942, equipped with nine Curtiss Hawk IIs.
- 70th Independent Chutai, 22 January 1942, equipped with 4 x Ki-15 Type 97 aircraft for reconnaissance missions.
- RTAF Light Bomber Squadrons 11 and 12, 13–26 April 1942.
- RTAF Heavy Bomber Squadron 05-9 May 1942, equipped with 9 x Ki-12 Type 97 Heavy Bombers.
- RTAF Light Bomber Squadrons 11, 12, and 62, 17–27 May 1942, equipped with 6 x Ki-21.
- 77th Sentai, 22 June 1942
- RTAF Squadrons 11 and 12, 19–28 June 1942.
- RTAF Squadrons 11 and 12, July–December 1942.
- RTAF Squadron 61, October–November 1942, equipped with 9 x Ki-21 Heavy Bombers.

== Post-war ==
In 1946, Thai Airways Company Limited begun commercial flight services at Lampang Airport, transporting passengers using DC-3 aircraft. In 1953, an aviation communication and air traffic control tower was constructed at Lampang Airport, with the airport offering aeronautical radio services. From 1963 to 1965, the Department of Commercial Aviation acquired an additional 41 rai, 1 nahn, and 22 square wah of land for airport development. In 1965, construction of a concrete passenger terminal building and a 5-storey control tower was completed. Additionally, the runway and taxiway surfaces were upgraded to improve performance. In 1986, further improvements were made on the runway, taxiway, and apron surfaces. The passenger terminal was also expanded to accommodate more passenger. In 1991, construction of a DVOR/DME navigation aid building was constructed, funded under the 1990 budget at a cost of 25 million baht. In 2012, construction of a new passenger terminal began with a budget of 236 million baht. The new terminal at Lampang Airport partially opened on 27 September 2015 and opened to the public on 22 October 2015.

Lampang Airport has a plan to expand its runway length from 1,971 metres (6,470 ft) long to 2,150–2,200 metres (7,050–7,220 ft) long and to add more aircraft parking spaces from 3 to 5 (2016 budget year).

== Airlines and destinations ==
Airlines	Destinations
Thai AirAsia	Bangkok–Don Mueang

== Runway taxiway and parking lot ==
- Runway is an asphalt concrete 1,971 metres (6,470 ft) long and 45 metres (148 ft) wide with a capacity of 64tons keep in reserve for 60 metres (200 ft) per side.
- Taxiway is same as the runway.
- Tarmac parking size is 60 by 250 metres (200 by 820 ft) which can accommodate three Boeing 737-400s and seven helicopters at the same time.

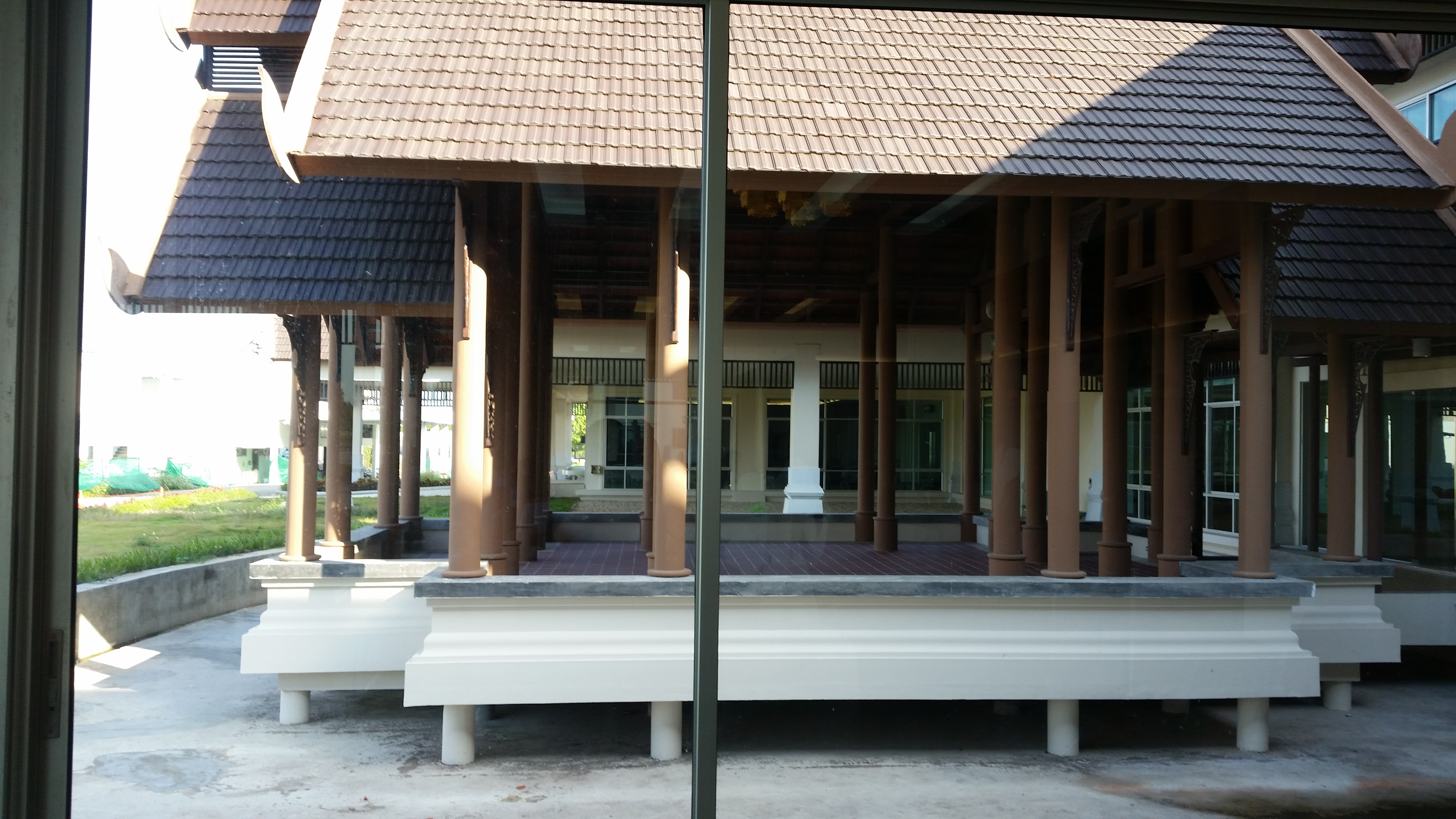
New airport pavilion

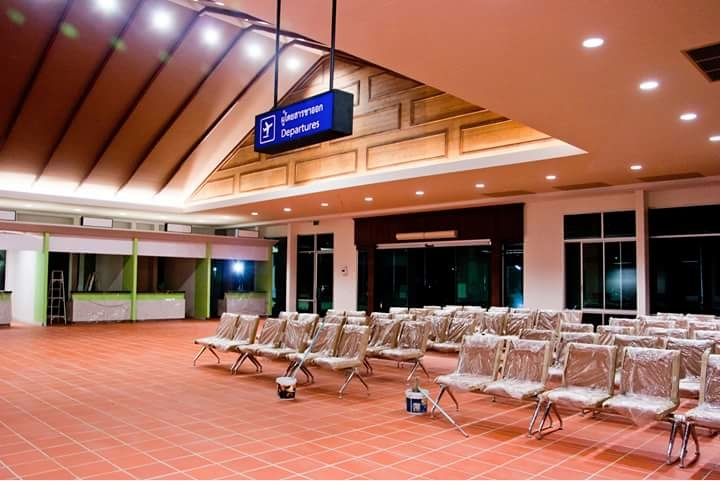
New departure lounge

== Buildings ==
- Air Traffic Control Building
- Tactical Air Navigation Building (NDB, VOR / DME, ILS)
- Air Field Lighting Building
- Airport Electricity System Building (PAPI, APP LIGHT. R/W T/W LIGHT)
- Emergency Electric Generator Building
- Fire Brigade and Salvation army Building
- Chancery 2 Floors 1 Building
- Arrival lounge
- Departure lounge
- Check-in Counter 3 Counters
- VIP Rooms 2 Rooms
- Shop
- Payphone
- Car Parking Lots
- Staff Building

== Statistics ==
Source: Department of Civil Aviation
Years	Passengers	Changes	Flights
2011	22,343	▲20.29%	739
2012	55,958	▲50.45%	1,214
2013	77,848	▲39.12%	1,612
2014	120,520	▲54.81%	2,515
2015	261,428	▲116.92%	4,602
