= Praphas Charusathien =

Thai field marshal (1912–1997)

Field Marshal Praphas Charusathien PChW SR MPCh MWM SMN OMRI LOM
- ประภาส จารุเสถียร
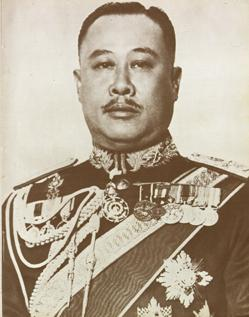

Deputy Prime Minister of Thailand
- In office 9 December 1963 – 14 October 1973
- Prime Minister: Thanom Kittikachorn
- In office 1 January 1958 – 20 October 1958
- Prime Minister: Thanom Kittikachorn

Minister of Interior
- In office 19 December 1972 – 14 October 1973
- Prime Minister: Thanom Kittikachorn
- Succeeded by: Kamol Wanprapa
- In office 23 September 1957 – 17 November 1971
- Prime Minister: Pote Sarasin; Thanom Kittikachorn; Sarit Thanarat; Thanom Kittikachorn
- Preceded by: Phao Siyanon

Commander-in-chief of the Royal Thai Army
- In office 1 October 1964 – 30 September 1973
- Preceded by: Thanom Kittikachorn
- Succeeded by: Kris Sivara

Director-General of the Royal Thai Police
- In office 1 October 1972 – 16 October 1973
- Preceded by: Prasert Rujirawongse
- Succeeded by: Prajuab Suntarangkool

Personal details
- Born: 25 November 1912 Mak Khaeng, Udon, Siam (now Mueang Udon Thani, Udon Thani, Thailand)
- Died: 18 August 1997 (aged 84) Bangkok, Thailand
- Spouse: Sawai Charusathien
- Children: 6

Military service
- Allegiance: Thailand
- Branch/service: Royal Thai Army
- Years of service: 1933–1973
- Rank: Field Marshal; Admiral of the Fleet; Marshal of the Air Force; Police General
- Commands: Commander-in-Chief of the Royal Thai Army; Deputy Supreme Commander of the Royal Thai Armed Forces; Director-General of the Royal Thai Police

Praphas Charusathien (Note: Alternative spellings of his first name: Prapas, Praphat, Prapass; last name: Charusathian, Charusathiara) (Thai: ประภาส จารุเสถียร, RTGS: Praphat Charusathian, Thai pronunciation: [pràʔpʰâːt t͡ɕaːrúʔsàʔtʰǐan]; 25 November 1912 – 18 August 1997) was a Thai military officer and politician. He was a field marshal of the Royal Thai Army and minister of interior in the governments of military rulers Sarit Thanarat and Thanom Kittikachorn.

== Personal life and education ==
Praphas graduated from the Chulachomklao Royal Military Academy and became an infantry officer. He was sponsored by Field Marshal and Prime Minister-to-be Sarit Thanarat. He was quickly promoted to higher ranks. In 1957, Sarit appointed him minister of interior, a position in which he continued to serve after Sarit's death in 1963. The new prime minister was Thanom Kittikachorn, whose son married Praphas' daughter. From 1963 to 1973, he was additionally deputy prime minister and Commander-in-Chief of the Royal Thai Army. During this time, Praphas was the strong man in the background who pulled the strings in the Thanom government. He was known for obscure financial transactions and political intrigues, while sitting on the boards of 44 companies.

In 1973, he was replaced as army commander by Gen.Krit Srivara, which signaled his loss of influence. In October 1973 protests against the rigid military rule grew into a massive popular uprising that was answered by a bloody crackdown on the protesting students and democracy activists. The many dead civilians prompted King Bhumibol Adulyadej to intervene. Praphas, Thanom and his son-in-law Col.Narong Kittikachorn went into exile.

Praphas returned to Thailand in January 1977, after the military had ended the democratic interlude in October 1976. However, he was not able to exercise political influence again.

== Family ==
Praphas married to Thanpuying Sawai Jarusathien, daughter of Lt. Von and Huai Panprasit. They have a total of 6 children. Praphas's children were married to important figures with military and political power, including Supaporn Charusathien married with Narong Kittikachorn son of Thanom Kittikachorn, Orapan Charusathien married with Yuthasak Sasiprapha and Supanapa Charusathien married with Somtat Attanand.

== Died ==
Praphas Charusathien died on 18 August 1997 in Bangkok.

== Honours and Personal Monogram ==
received the following royal decorations in the Honours System of Thailand:

- 1964 - Knight Grand Cross of the Most Illustrious Order of Chula Chom Klao
- 1973 - Knight Grand Commander of the Honourable Order of Rama
- 1959 - Knight Grand Cordon of the Most Exalted Order of the White Elephant
- 1957 - Knight Grand Cordon of the Most Noble Order of the Crown of Thailand
- 1988 - Member of the Order of Symbolic Propitiousness Ramkeerati
- 1934 - Dushdi Mala Medal Pin of Bravery (Military)
- 1941 - Victory Medal - Franco-Thai War
- 1962 - Victory Medal - World War II
- 1969 - Freeman Safeguarding Medal - 1st Class
- 1934 - Safeguarding the Constitution Medal
- 1958 - Border Service Medal
- 1945 - Chakra Mala Medal
- 1950 - King Rama VIII Royal Cypher Medal, 3rd Class
- 1959 - King Rama IX Royal Cypher Medal, 2nd Class
- 1929 - King Rama VII Coronation Medal
- 1950 - King Rama IX Coronation Medal
- 1932 - Commemorative Medal on the Occasion of the 150th Years of Rattanakosin Celebration

=== Foreign honours ===
- Burma :
  - 1956 - Commander of the Order of the Union of Burma (Civilian Member)
- Netherlands :
  - 1963 - Grand Cross of the Order of Orange-Nassau
    - 1955 - Grand Officer of the Order of Orange-Nassau
- Francoist Spain :
  - 1957 - Grand Cross of the Cross of Military Merit
- Italy :
  - 1961 - Grand Cross of the Order of Merit of the Italian Republic
- Taiwan :
  - 1962 - Order of the Cloud and Banner with Special Grand Cordon
- USA :
  - 1962 - Commander of the Legion of Merit
- Germany :
  - 1963 - Grand Cross of the Order of Merit of the Federal Republic of Germany with Sash and Star
- Kingdom of Greece :
  - 1963 - Grand Cross of the Order of George I
- Malaysia :
  - 1964 - Honorary Grand Commander of the Order of the Defender of the Realm
- Belgium :
  - 1964 - Grand Cordon of the Order of Leopold
- Austria :
  - 1964 - Grand Decoration of Honour in Gold of the Decoration of Honour for Services to the Republic of Austria with Sash
- South Korea :
  - 1966 - Order of Service Merit, First Class
  - 1968 - Order of Military Merit, First Class
- Japan :
  - 1966 - Grand Cordon of the Order of the Rising Sun
- Norway :
  - 1967 - Grand Cross of the Order of St. Olav
- Sweden :
  - 1967 - Commander Grand Cross of the Order of the Sword
- Kingdom of Laos :
  - 1967 - Grand Cross of the Order of the Million Elephants and the White Parasol
- Philippines :
  - 1968 - Grand Cross of the Order of Sikatuna
- Ethiopian Empire :
  - 1968 - Knight Grand Cross of the Order of Menelik II
