= Thanom Kittikachorn =

Prime Minister of Thailand (1958; 1963–1973)

Field Marshal Thanom Kittikachorn PChW SR MPCh MWM SMN GCC KmstkSO OMRI GCS GCMG LOM
- ถนอม กิตติขจร
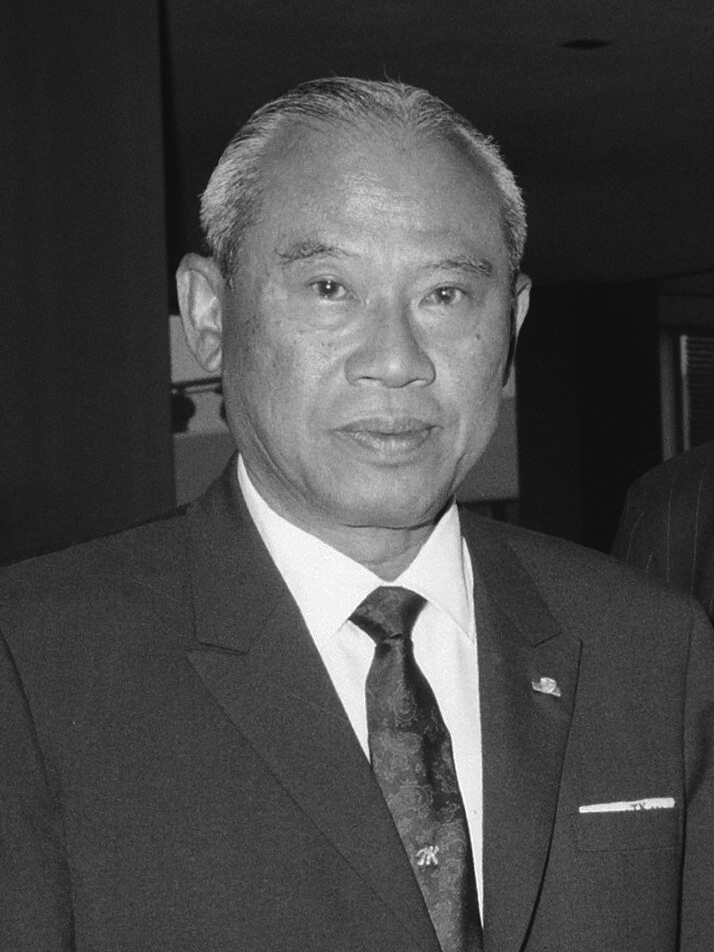
- Thanom in 1968

10th Prime Minister of Thailand
- In office 9 December 1963 – 14 October 1973
- Monarch: Bhumibol Adulyadej
- Deputy: See list: Praphas Charusathien; Prince Wan Waithayakon; Pote Sarasin
- Preceded by: Sarit Thanarat
- Succeeded by: Sanya Dharmasakti
- In office 1 January 1958 – 20 October 1958
- Monarch: Bhumibol Adulyadej
- Deputy: See list: Praphas Charusathien; Prince Wan Waithayakon; Sukich Nimmanheminda
- Preceded by: Pote Sarasin
- Succeeded by: Sarit Thanarat

Supreme Commander of the Armed Forces
- In office 11 December 1963 – 30 September 1973
- Preceded by: Sarit Thanarat
- Succeeded by: Dawee Chullasapya

Commander-in-chief of the Royal Thai Army
- In office 11 December 1963 – 1 October 1964
- Preceded by: Sarit Thanarat
- Succeeded by: Praphas Charusathien

Deputy Prime Minister of Thailand
- In office 9 February 1959 – 8 December 1963
- Prime Minister: Sarit Thanarat
- Preceded by: Sukich Nimmanheminda
- Succeeded by: Praphas Charusathien

Minister of Foreign Affairs
- In office 19 December 1972 – 14 October 1973
- Prime Minister: Himself
- Preceded by: Jaroonphan Isarangkun Na Ayutthaya
- Succeeded by: Jaroonphan Isarangkun Na Ayutthaya

President of Chiang Mai University
- In office 21 February 1964 – 20 February 1972
- Prime Minister: Himself
- Preceded by: University established
- Succeeded by: Sukich Nimmanheminda

Minister of Defence
- In office 23 September 1957 – 14 October 1973
- Prime Minister: Pote Sarasin; Sarit Thanarat; Himself
- Preceded by: Plaek Phibunsongkhram
- Succeeded by: Dawee Chullasapya

Personal details
- Born: Thanom (Note: At that time, Thailand did not have surnames); 11 August 1911 Tak, Nakhon Sawan, Siam (now Mueang Tak, Tak, Thailand)
- Died: 16 June 2004 (aged 92) Bangkok, Thailand
- Party: United Thai People's Party
- Other political affiliations: National Socialist Party
- Spouse: Jongkol Kittikachorn (m. 1930)
- Children: 6, including Narong

Military service
- Allegiance: Thailand
- Branch/service: Royal Thai Army
- Years of service: 1929–1973
- Rank: Field Marshal; Admiral of the Fleet; Marshal of the Air Force
- Commands: Supreme Commander of the Royal Thai Armed Forces
- Battles/wars: Franco-Thai War; World War II; Korean War; Vietnam War

Marshal Thanom Kittikachorn (Thai: ถนอม กิตติขจร, RTGS: Thanom Kittikhachon, pronounced [tʰā.nɔ̌ːm kìt.tì(ʔ).kʰā.tɕɔ̄ːn]; 11 August 1911 – 16 June 2004) was Prime Minister of Thailand from 1963 to 1973. Prior to taking office, he supported and initiated military coups and served as Thailand's defence minister. He was forced to step down after public protests which exploded into violence in 1973. His return from exile in 1976 sparked protests which led to a massacre of demonstrators, followed by a military coup.

== Early life ==
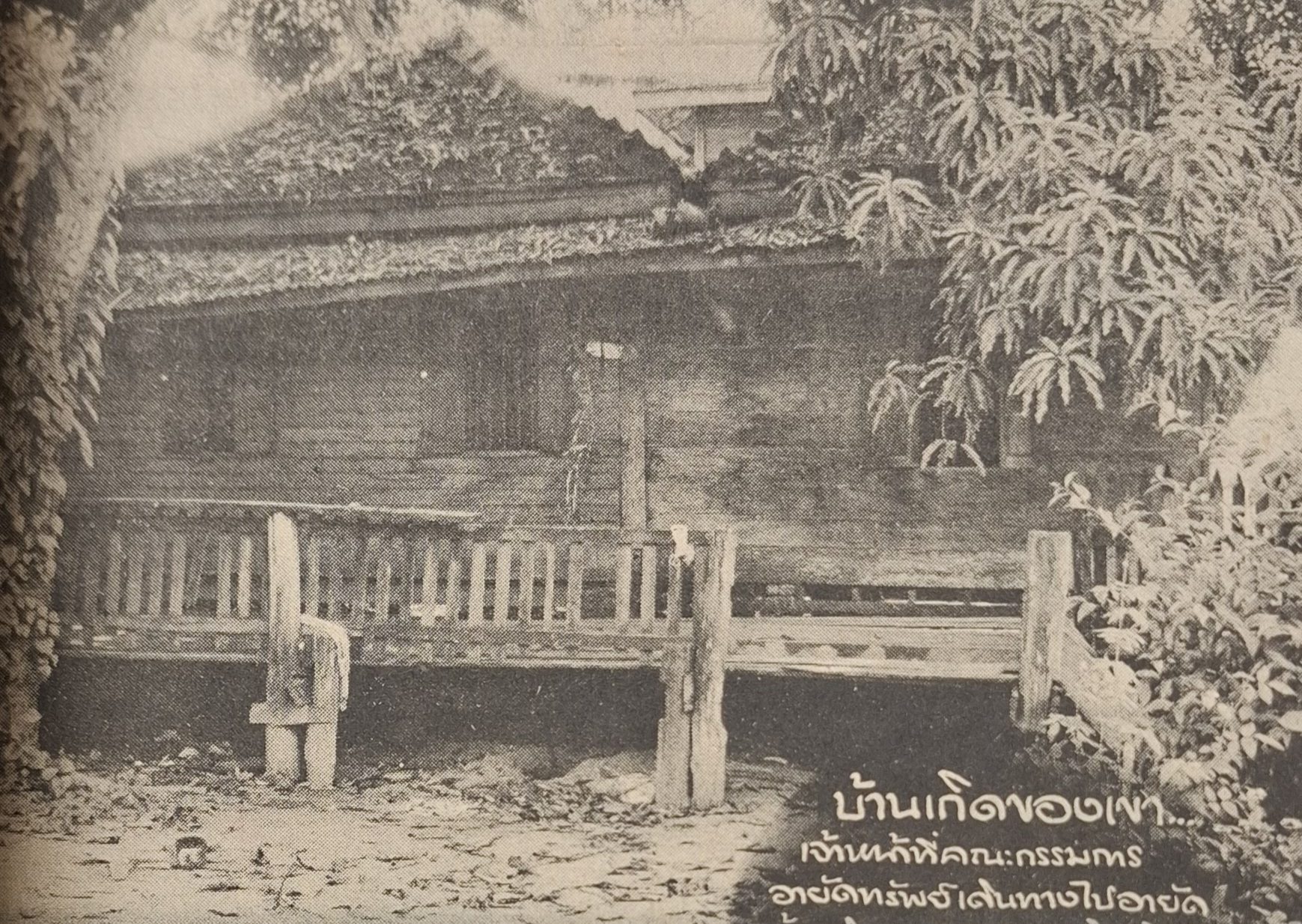
Thanom birth house at Tak

Thanom Kittikachorn was born to Hainamese parents in Tak Province to Khun Amphan Kittikachorn and his wife, Linchee Kittikachorn. His family was of Thai Chinese descent. He attended Wat Koak Plu Municipal School, then was admitted to the Army Cadet Academy. After receiving his commission, he reported for duty with Infantry Regiment VII in Chiang Mai. Thanom later studied at the Cartography School and the Infantry School, and graduated from the National Defense College in its first class.

== Rise to power ==
After serving in the Shan States of Burma during the British Raj, then Lieutenant Colonel Thanom took part in a successful 1947 coup headed by Colonel Sarit Thanarat. He became a regimental commander and was head of the Lopburi military department. He was soon promoted to colonel, commanding the 11th Infantry Division. Thanom was appointed a member of parliament in 1951, his first political role. He was promoted to major general the same year.

In February 1953, Thanom led the suppression of a rebellion against military rule, and was rewarded with promotion to lieutenant general. He represented Thailand at the ceremony to mark the end of the Korean War in July 1953 and was later promoted as commander of the 1st Region Army.

He was appointed deputy cooperatives minister in 1955. Thanom supported Sarit in his coup against the government of Field Marshal Plaek Phibunsongkhram, and was subsequently appointed defence minister in Pote Sarasin's puppet regime in 1957. Thanom consolidated his power base as the second military leader and right-hand man of Sarit. A few days after the December 1957 general election, in which the pro-government Sahaphum Party ("United Land") had performed disappointingly, Thanom co-founded the National Socialist Party (Chat Sangkhomniyom). He became the deputy leader of this party, designed to extend the pro-government camp and win over former members of Phibunsongkhram's Seri Manangkhasila Party who had been reelected to parliament as independents.

In 1958, he was made a full general and assumed the offices of prime minister and defence minister. He was prime minister for nine months, after which he was replaced by Sarit himself and made deputy prime minister, defence minister, and armed forces deputy supreme commander.

== Prime Minister of Thailand ==
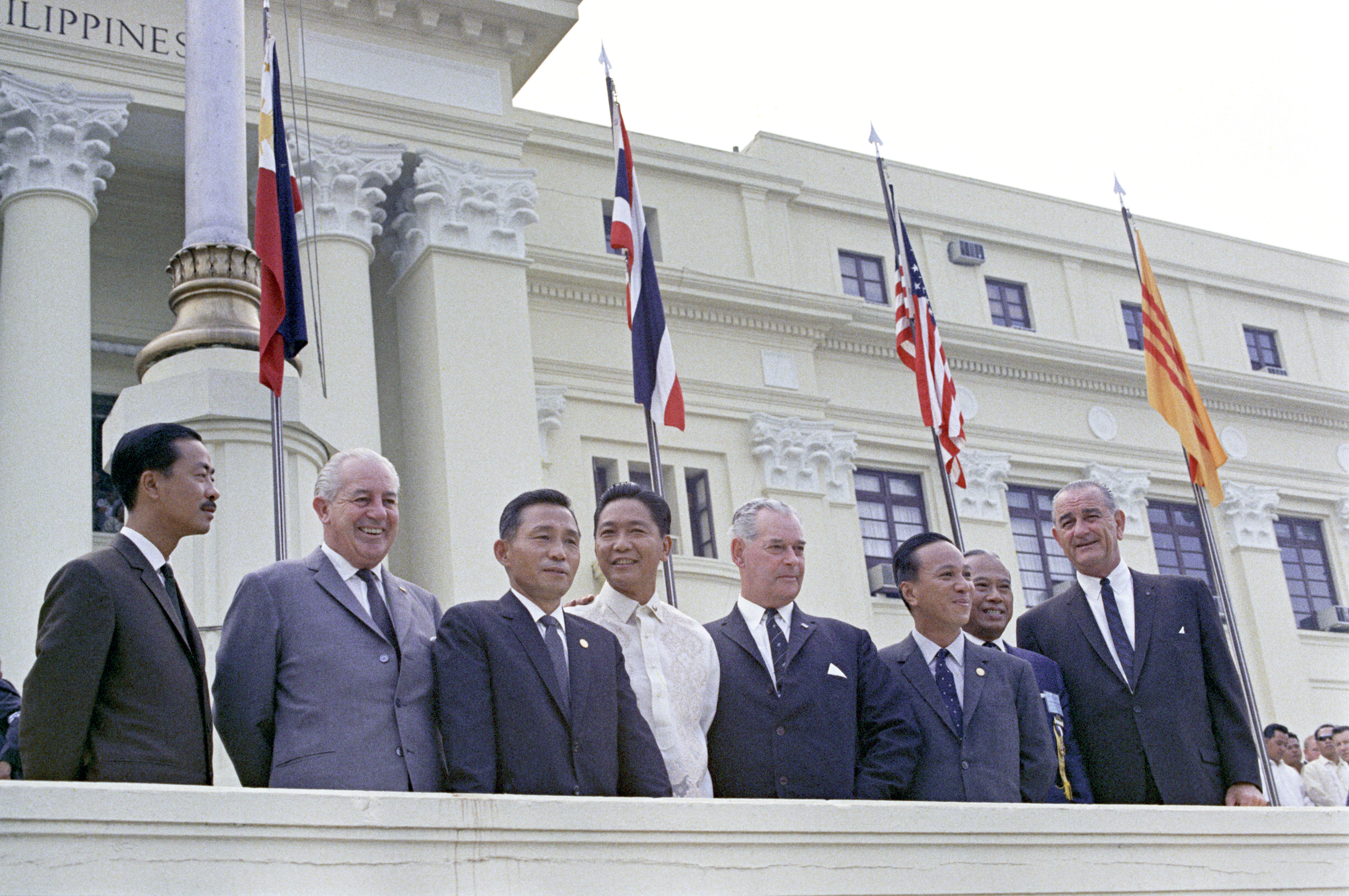
Prime Minister Thanom (second right) at the 1966 Manila Summit Conference

Thanom succeeded his predecessor as prime minister one day after Sarit's death in 1963. He subsequently appointed himself commander-in-chief of the army. One year later, he promoted himself to the concurrent ranks of field marshal, admiral of the fleet, and marshal of the air force. Thanom continued the pro-American and anti-communist politics of his predecessor, which helped to ensure massive US economic and financial aid during the Vietnam War. Although he was personally popular, his regime was known for massive corruption. He established and led the United Thai People's Party (Saha Prachathai) in October 1968.

Thanom reappointed himself prime minister in February 1969 after general elections had been completed. The following year saw the beginnings of the 1970s peasant revolts in Thailand. Afterwards, in November 1971, he staged a self-coup, citing the need to suppress communist infiltration. He dissolved parliament and appointed himself Chairman of the National Executive Council, and served as a caretaker government for one year. In December 1972, he appointed himself prime minister for a fourth time, also serving as the defence and foreign ministers. Thanom, his son Colonel Narong, and Narong's father-in-law General Praphas Charusathien became known as the "three tyrants".

=== 1973 uprising and resignation ===
Public discontent against Thanom's government grew in 1973 following a military poaching incident at Thung Yai Naresuan Wildlife Sanctuary in Tak province, and the expulsion of nine students from Ramkhamhaeng University for publishing satire criticising the government. Fuelled by other grievances with Thanom's government, university students began protesting. In early October, mass student demonstrations prompted by the arrest of 13 students and faculty members forced Thanom to agree to the return of a constitutional government. However, tensions escalated on 14 October when the police and military, in an attempt to disband a demonstration in front of the Grand Palace, opened fire on the group - 66 were killed, and 876 were injured. Shortly after, King Bhumibol announced over the radio and television that Thanom had resigned as Prime Minister. Fighting between police and students ended on 15 October when it was announced that Thanom, alongside Narong and Praphas, had fled Thailand.

In Thanom's place, Bhumibol appointed Sanya Dharmasakti as Prime Minister to form a new government and draft a new constitution. A general election was subsequently held in 1975. However, this period of democracy post-Thanom was short lived when the military staged a coup on 6 October 1976 following Thanom's return from exile.

== Post-premiership ==
Thanom at a press conference in 1966

During his exile, Thanom was ordained at Wat Ananda Metyarama in Singapore. In October 1976, Thanom returned to Thailand in the robes of a novice monk, to stay at Bangkok's Wat Bowonniwet. Even though he announced he had no desire to enter politics, his return triggered student protests, which eventually moved onto the campus of Thammasat University. This was only a year after South Vietnam and Thailand's neighbors Laos and Cambodia had fallen to the communists, and right-wing Thais suspected the protesters wished the same fate for their own country. On 6 October 1976, right-wing militants, aided by government security forces, stormed the Thammasat campus, violently broke up the protests, and killed many protesters. That evening, the military seized power from the elected civilian government of Democrat MR Seni Pramoj and installed hard-line royalist Thanin Kraivichien as premier.

Thanom soon left his monkhood, but he remained out of politics. Later in his life, he attempted to rehabilitate his tarnished image and recover properties seized when his government was overthrown.

Controversy arose in early 1999 when it became known that Thanom was appointed as an honorary officer of the Royal Guard by prime minister Chuan Leekpai as recommended by the military. Thanom settled the matter himself by resigning.

Thanom Kittikachorn died in 2004 at the age of 92 in Bangkok General Hospital, after suffering a stroke and a heart attack two years earlier. His family's medical expenses were paid by King Bhumibol Adulyadej, which some saw as recognition of Thanom's agreeing to the king's request that he leave the country to end the violence in 1973. Thanom's cremation was held on 25 February 2007 at Wat Debsirin. Queen Sirikit presided over the cremation ceremony, lighting the royal flame on behalf of King Bhumibol. Her youngest daughter, the Princess Chulabhorn, was also present. Thanom's wife died in 2012, aged 96.

== Honours ==
Thanom received the following royal decorations in the Honours System of Thailand:

- 1961 - Knight Grand Cross (First Class) of The Most Illustrious Order of Chula Chom Klao
- 1965 - Knight Grand Commander of the Honourable Order of Rama
- 1956 - Knight Grand Cordon (Special Class) of the Most Exalted Order of the White Elephant
- 1955 - Knight Grand Cordon (Special Class) of The Most Noble Order of the Crown of Thailand
- 1988 - Order of Symbolic Propitiousness Ramkeerati (Special Class)
- 1972 - Bravery Medal with wreath
- 1962 - Victory Medal - World War II
- 1955 - Victory Medal - Korean War (with flames)
- 1972 - Victory Medal - Vietnam War (with flames)
- 1969 - Freeman Safeguarding Medal (First Class)
- 1934 - Safeguarding the Constitution Medal
- 1943 - Medal for Service Rendered in the Interior
- 1962 - Border Service Medal
- 1944 - Chakra Mala Medal
- 1950 - King Rama VIII Royal Cypher Medal, Third Class
- 1964 - King Rama IX Royal Cypher Medal, First Class
- 1952 - King Rama VII Coronation Medal
- 1950 - King Rama IX Coronation Medal
- 1932 - 150 Years Commemoration of Bangkok Medal
- 1957 - 25th Buddhist Century Celebration Medal
- 1972 - Red Cross Medal of Appreciation, First Class

=== Foreign honours ===
- Taiwan :
  - Special Grand Cordon of the Order of the Sacred Tripod
  - Special Grand Cordon of the Order of the Cloud and Banner
  - Special Grand Cordon of the Order of Brilliant Star
  - Special Grand Cordon of the Order of Propitious Clouds
- South Korea :
  - Republic of Korea Medal of the Order of Merit for National Foundation
  - Taegeuk of the Order of Military Merit
  - Blue Stripes of the Order of Service Merit
- United States :
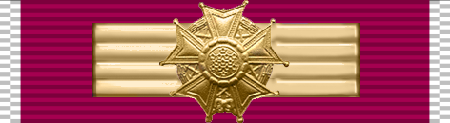
  - Chief Commander of the Legion of Merit (1969)
    - Commander Degree (4 December 1959)
    - Officer Degree (8 February 1955)
- South Vietnam :
  - Grand Cross of the National Order of Vietnam
  - Kim Khanh Decoration, First Class
- Philippines :
  - Chief Commander of the Legion of Honor
- Spain :
  - Grand Cross with White Decoration of the Order of Military Merit
- Vatican City :
  - Grand Cross of the Order of St. Gregory the Great
- Denmark :
  - Grand Cross of the Order of the Dannebrog
- Portugal :
  - Grand Cross of the Order of Christ (G.C.C.) (20 January 1961)
- Germany :
  - Grand Cross 1st Class of the Order of Merit of the Federal Republic of Germany
- Luxembourg :
  - Grand Cross of the Order of the Oak Crown
- Sweden :
  - Commander Grand Cross of the Royal Order of the Sword
- Italy :
  - Grand Cross of the Order of Merit of the Italian Republic (O.M.R.I.)
- Netherlands :
  - Grand Cross of the Order of Orange-Nassau
- Belgium :
  - Grand Cordon of the Order of Leopold
- Indonesia :
  - Star of Mahaputera, 2nd Class
- Argentina :
  - Grand Cross of the Order of the Liberator General San Martín
- Japan :
  - Grand Cordon of the Order of the Rising Sun
- Kingdom of Laos :
  - Grand Cross of the Order of the Million Elephants and the White Parasol
- United Kingdom :
  - Honorary Grand Cross of the Order of St Michael and St George (G.C.M.G.) - Sir.
- Ethiopian Empire :
  - Grand Cross of the Order of the Holy Trinity
- Malaya :
  - Honorary Grand Commander of the Order of the Defender of the Realm (1962) (S.M.N.) - Tun.
- Austria :
  - Grand Star of the Decoration of Honour for Services to the Republic of Austria
- Kingdom of Greece :
  - Grand Cross of the Order of George I
- Kingdom of Norway :
  - Grand Cross of the Order of St. Olav
- Imperial Iran :
  - Knight of the Order of the Crown (Iran)
- Tunisia :
  - Order of the Republic (Tunisia)
- United Nations :
  - United Nations Korea Medal

== Notes ==
Political offices
| Preceded by Pote Sarasin | Prime Minister of Thailand; 1958 | Succeeded by Sarit Thanarat |
| Preceded by Sarit Thanarat | Prime Minister of Thailand; 1963–1973 | Succeeded by Sanya Dharmasakti |
Military offices
| Preceded by Sarit Thanarat | Supreme Commander of the Royal Thai Armed Forces; 1963–1973 | Succeeded by Dawee Chullasapya |
| Preceded by Sarit Thanarat | Commander-in-Chief of the Royal Thai Army; 1963–1964 | Succeeded by Praphas Charusathien |
