= Communist insurgency in Thailand =

1965–1983 guerrilla war primarily in northeast Thailand

- Part of the Cold War and the Indochina wars
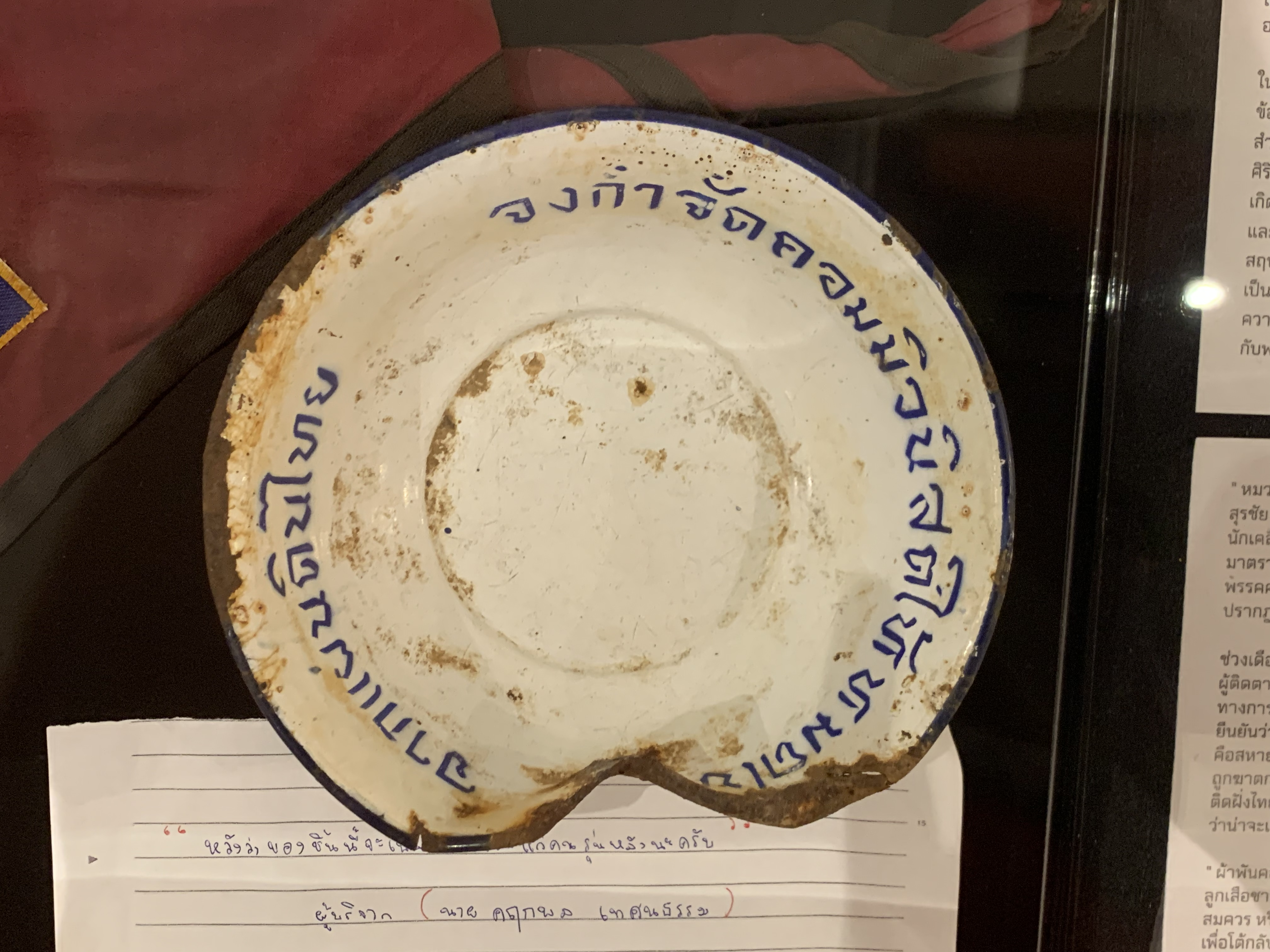
- A zinc bowl engraved with Thai message reading "Obliterate all the communists – out of the soil of Thailand" – a propaganda tool against communist insurgency in Thailand, discovered in Wanon Niwat district, Sakon Nakhon province
Date	1965–1983 (18 years)
Location	Thailand (primarily northeast Thailand, Northern Region and Southern Region)
Result	Thai government victory: Amnesty declared on 23 April 1980 by the Thai government; Order 66/2523 signed by Prime Minister Prem Tinsulanonda; Communist insurgency declines and ends in 1983

Belligerents
Thailand; Royal Thai Armed Forces; Thahan Phran; Royal Thai Police; Border Patrol Police; Volunteer Defense Corps; Internal Security Operations Command; Thai Ultranationalist Organization; Village Scouts; Nawaphon; Red Gaurs; Kingdom of Laos (until 1975); ROC 93rd Division; Malaysia; Shan United Revolutionary Army; Karen National Union: United States; CIA; United States Air Force in Thailand; United States Air Force Security Forces	Communist Party of Thailand; People's Liberation Army of Thailand; Federation of Farmers and Workers; National Student Center of Thailand; Minority ethnic groups, especially the Hmong; Pathet Lao (until 1975); Malayan Communist Party; Communist Party of Burma Khmer Rouge (until 1978); People's Republic of Kampuchea (since 1979); People's Republic of China (until 1976); North Vietnam (until 1976)

Commanders and leaders
Bhumibol Adulyadej (Note: as Supreme Commander of the Royal Armed Forces); Thanom Kittikachorn (Note: as Prime Minister, Commander in Chief of the Royal Armed Forces 1963–1973 and Minister of Defence 1957–1973); Praphas Charusathien (Note: as Deputy Prime Minister 1963–1973, Commander in Chief of the Royal Army and Director-General of the Royal Police 1964–1973); Thanin Kraivichien (Note: as Prime Minister 1976–1977); Kriangsak Chamanan (Note: as Prime Minister 1977–1980, Minister of Interior 1976–1980, Minister of Defence 1977–1979 and Commander in Chief of the Royal Armed Forces 1977–1978); Prem Tinsulanonda (Note: as Prime Minister 1980–1988, Minister of Defence 1979–1986, Commander in Chief of the Royal Army 1978–1982, Commander of Military Region 2 (Isan) 1974–1977); Saiyud Kerdphol (Note: as Co-Founder of Internal Security Operations Command); Arthit Kamlang-ek (Note: as Special military advisor to General Prem Tinasulanon, Commander of 1st Army Region 1981–1982 and Commander-in-chief of Royal Thai Army 1982–1986); Chavalit Yongchaiyudh (Note: as Director of Army Operations); Phoumi Nosavan; Vang Pao; Li Mi (Note: until 1967); Tuan Shi-wen (Note: as Commander of Republic of China Army 93rd Division); Ibrahim Ismail; Richard Helms; Lucius D. Clay Jr.; Khun Sa; Bo Mya	Phayom Chulanont; Udom Srisuwan; Damri Ruangsutham (POW); Wirat Anghathawon (POW); Thong Chaemsri (POW); Chit Phumisak †; Surachai Danwattananusorn (POW); Seksan Prasertkul (surrendered); Thirayuth Boonmee (surrendered); Kaysone Phomvihane; Nouhak Phoumsavanh; Chin Peng; Abdullah CD; Thakin Ba Thein Tin; Thakin Soe

Strength
Royal Thai Armed Forces: 127,700; Royal Thai Police: 45,800	1,000–12,000 rebels 5,000–8,000 sympathizers

Casualties and losses
1966: ~90 soldiers and police killed 1967: 33 soldiers and police killed 1969–1971: 1,450+ soldiers, police, and officials killed 100+ wounded 1972: 418 soldiers and police killed	1966: 133 insurgents killed and 49 captured 1967: 93 insurgents killed unknown captured 1969–1971: 365+ insurgents killed 30+ wounded 49+ captured 1972: 1,172 insurgents killed 1982: Unknown killed 3,000+ insurgents surrendered
- Unknown civilian killed (3,008 killed by government forces alone in 1971–1973)

The communist insurgency in Thailand (also known as the Thai people's war) was a guerrilla war lasting from 1965 until 1983, fought mainly between the Communist Party of Thailand (CPT) and the government of Thailand. The war began to wind down in 1980 following the declaration of an amnesty, and in 1983, the CPT abandoned the insurgency entirely, ending the conflict.

== Background ==
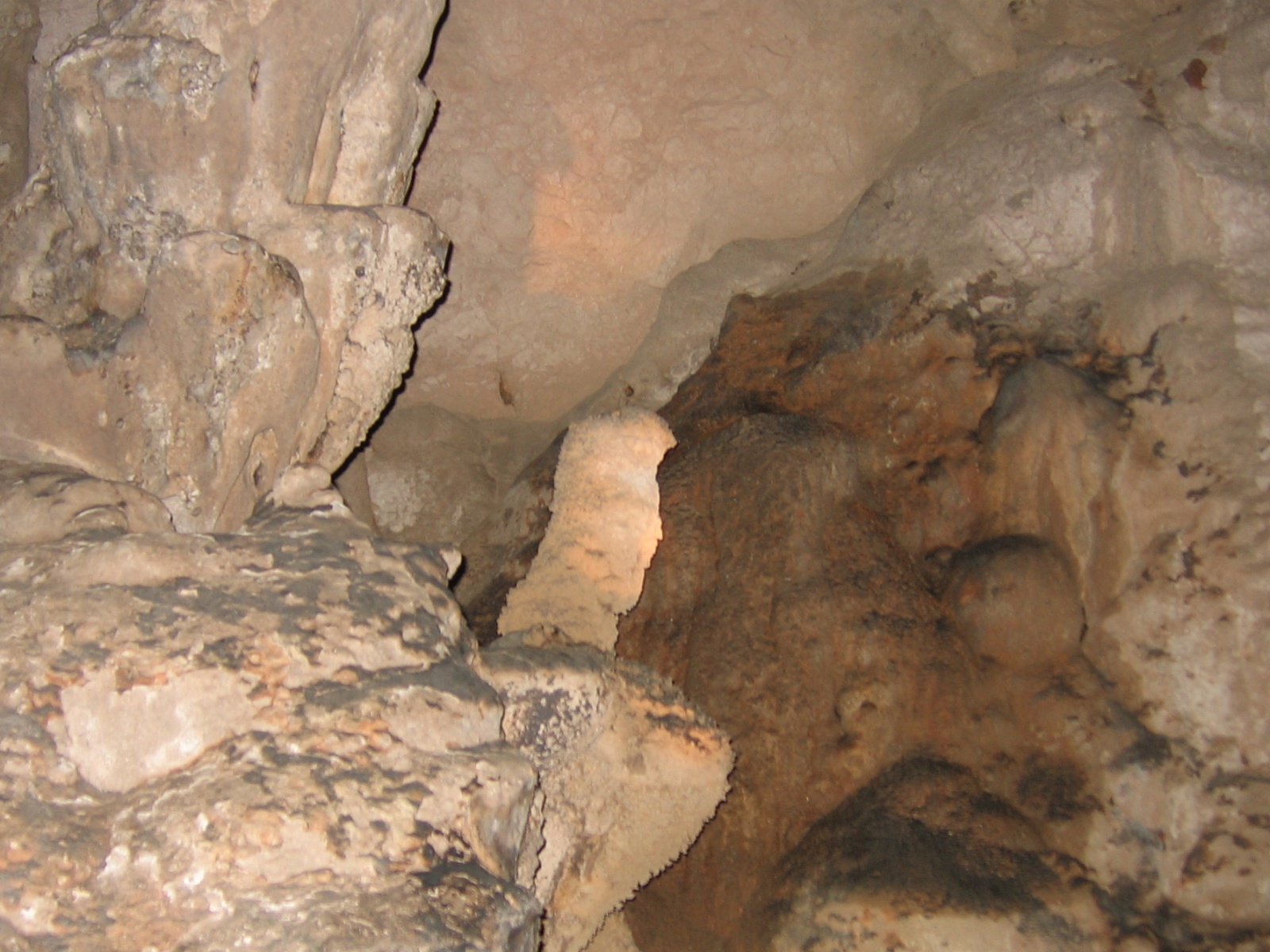
Ta Ko Bi Cave, a former hideout of communists in Thailand

In 1927, Chinese communist Han Minghuang attempted to create a communist organization in Bangkok before being arrested. Ho Chi Minh visited northern Thailand the following year, attempting to organize soviets in local Vietnamese communities. In the aftermath of the Siamese revolution of 1932, conservative Prime Minister Phraya Manopakorn Nitithada accused his political opponent Pridi Banomyong of being a communist, with his government passing the Anti-communist act of 1933, which criminalized communism.

During World War II, communists formed an alliance with the Free Thai Movement. In 1946, Pridi Banomyong assumed office, repealing the Anti-communist act and establishing diplomatic relations with the Soviet Union.

In 1949, Banomyong's attempt to return to power after the 1947 Thai coup d'état was crushed. The suppression of the Palace Rebellion in 1949 convinced the CPT leadership that better preparations had to be made in order for a future rebellion to succeed.

The failure of the 1952 Peace Rebellion was followed by the 13 November 1952 Anti-communist act, sparked by the spontaneous involvement of a small number of communist party members in the rebellion.

During the course of the Korean War, the CPT continued to stockpile weaponry in rural areas and make general preparations for armed struggle. At the same time, the CPT formed the Peace Committee of Thailand, a pacifist movement operating mainly in urban areas. The Peace Committee contributed to CPT's expansion and the rise of anti-American sentiment in the country.

In 1960, North Vietnam created a training camp for Thai and Laotian volunteers in Hòa Bình, Vietnam. A total of 400 people attended the camp in its first year of operation.

Ideologically, the CPT aligned with Maoism and during the Sino-Soviet split the party sided with the Chinese Communist Party. In October 1964, the organization declared its position in a congratulatory message on the occasion of the 15th anniversary of the foundation of the People's Republic of China, and the following month a group of Thai communists formed the Thailand Independence Movement in Peking, China.

On 8 December 1964, the Thailand Independence Movement issued a manifesto demanding the removal of US military personnel from Thailand and calling for regime change. The manifesto was later also broadcast by Radio Peking. Former Thai army officer Phayom Chulanont established the Thai Patriotic Front, another Thai communist organization, on 1 January 1965. The two parties formed the Thai United Patriotic Front on 15 December 1966. Hill tribesmen, as well as members of the Chinese and Vietnamese ethnic minorities, formed the backbone of the movement.

== Conflict ==
In the early 1950s, a group of 50 Thai communists traveled to Beijing, where they received training in ideology and propaganda. In 1961, small groups of Pathet Lao insurgents infiltrated north Thailand. Local communist party cells were organized and volunteers were sent to Chinese, Laotian and North Vietnamese training camps, where training focused on armed struggle and terror tactics to fight capitalism in the region. Between 1962 and 1965, 350 Thai nationals underwent an eight-month training course in North Vietnam. The guerrillas initially possessed only a limited number of flintlocks as well as French, Chinese and Japanese weapons. In the first half of 1965, the rebels smuggled approximately 3,000 US-made weapons and 90,000 rounds of ammunition from Laos. The shipment, originally supplied to the US-supported Royal Lao Armed Forces, was instead sold to smugglers who in turn traded the weapons to the CPT.

Between 1961 and 1965, insurgents carried out 17 political assassinations. They avoided full scale guerrilla warfare until the summer of 1965, when militants began engaging Thai security forces. A total of 13 clashes were recorded during that period. The second half of 1965 was marked by a further 25 violent incidents, and starting in November 1965, CPT insurgents began undertaking more elaborate operations, including an ambush on a Thai police patrol outside Mukdahan, at that time in Nakhon Phanom Province.

The insurgency spread to other parts of Thailand in 1966, although 90 percent of insurgency-related incidents occurred in the northeast of the country. On 14 January 1966, a spokesman representing the Thai Patriotic Front called for the start of a "people's war" in Thailand. The statement marked an escalation of violence in the conflict, and in early April 1966 rebels killed 16 Thai soldiers and wounded 13 others during clashes in Chiang Rai Province. A total of 45 security personnel and 65 civilians were killed by insurgent attacks during the first half of 1966.

Despite five insurgent attacks on the bases used by the United States Air Force in Thailand, American involvement in the conflict remained limited.

Following the defeat of the National Revolutionary Army in the Chinese Civil War, its 49th Division crossed into Thailand from neighboring Yunnan. The Chinese troops began engaging in the opium trade with the tacit approval of the government, with officers being involved in the trafficking of opium produced by tribal groups in Yunnan, Burma, Laos, and Thailand, collecting "protection fees" in their various areas of influence, in exchange for the safety of trafficked goods from other armed organisations. The trade provided a source of income for the local population, with the Thai government not following its obligations to eliminate the trade, fearing economic catastrophe in the north if it was ended with no alternative source of income. At the same time, nationalist troops cooperated with the government during its counter-insurgency operations. In July 1967, the 1967 Opium War broke out when warlord Khun Sa refused to pay the informal "taxes" which Kuomintang officers operating in Thailand levied on opium caravans. Government forces became involved in the conflict, destroying a number of villages and resettling suspected communists, providing new recruits for the CPT.

In February and August 1967, the Thai government conducted a number of counter-insurgency raids in Bangkok and Thonburi, arresting 30 CPT members including secretary-general Thong Chaemsri. Further arrests ensued in October and November 1968.

=== Operation Thong Pha Phum ===
From 1972 to 1974, the Royal Thai Marine Corps and Royal Thai Air Force participated in anti-communist operations in the Chiang Rai province. The AU-23A Peacemaker was primarily used during the operation. Flying Unit 2232, Task Force 170, and Task Force 172 were tasked with these operations and were based at Chiang Kham Airport.

=== Operation Sam-Chai ===
The Royal Thai Armed Forces, Royal Thai Air Force, and Royal Thai Marine Corps collaborated on a joint-military operation which begun on 3 July 1972. They participated in anti-communist insurgent operations in the provinces of Phetchabun, Phitsanulok, and Loei. This operation was also the first time the RTMC collaborated with the RTA and the RTAF during a mission. The operation ended in 29 January 1973, resulting in a successful disruption in insurgent activities.

The Thai government deployed over 12,000 troops to the country's northern provinces in January 1972, carrying out a six-week operation in which over 200 militants were killed. The government's casualties during the operation amounted to 30 soldiers killed and 100 wounded.

=== 1972 - 1983 ===
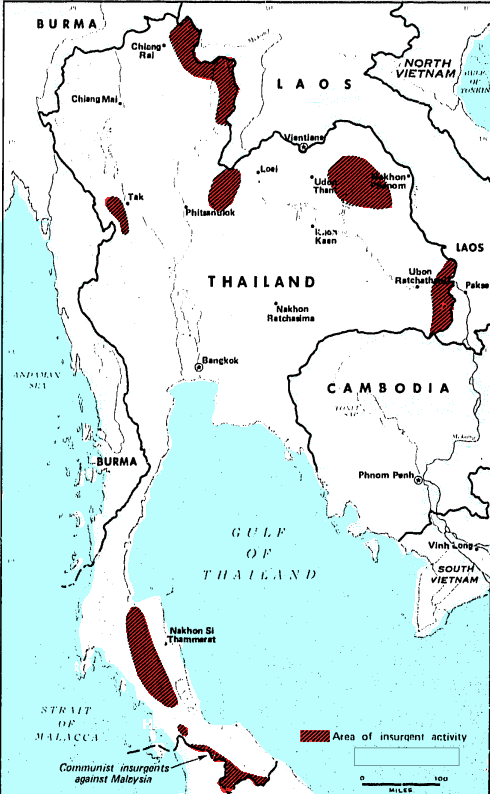
Map of communist insurgent activity in Thailand in 1972

In late 1972, the Royal Thai Army, police, and volunteer defence forces committed the Red Drum killings of more than 200 (unofficial accounts speak of up to 3,000) civilians who were accused of supporting communists in Tambon Lam Sai, Phatthalung Province, southern Thailand. The massacre was probably ordered by the government's Communist Suppression Operations Command (CSOC).

It was only one example "of a pattern of widespread abuse of power by the army and enforcement agencies" during the brutal anti-communist operations of 1971–1973 that took an official death toll of 3,008 civilians throughout the country (while unofficial estimates are between 1,000 and 3,000 in Phatthalung Province alone). Those killed were accused of working with the CPT. Until that point, communist suspects arrested by soldiers were normally shot by the roadside. The "red oil drum" technique was later introduced to eliminate any possible evidence. Suspects were clubbed to a point of semi-consciousness before being dumped in gasoline-filled, used oil drums and burnt alive. The 200 litre red drums had an iron grille divider with a fire below and the suspect above.

By 1976, the population of areas judged to be under Communist control was 1,000,000 while the CPT's strength reached between 7,000 and 10,000. On 6 October 1976, amid rising fears of a communist takeover similar to the one that had taken place in Vietnam, anti-communist police and paramilitaries attacked a leftist student demonstration at Thammasat University in Bangkok, during an incident that became known as the Thammasat University massacre. According to official estimates, 46 students were killed and 167 wounded.

From 1979, amid the rise of Thai nationalism and the deterioration of China–Vietnam relations, the CPT fell into serious turmoil. The pro-Vietnamese wing had eventually seceded and formed a separated faction called Pak Mai.

Efforts to end the insurgency led to an amnesty being declared on 23 April 1980 when Prime Minister Prem Tinsulanonda signed Order 66/2523. The order significantly contributed to the decline of the insurgency, as it granted amnesty to defectors and promoted political participation and democratic processes. By 1983, the insurgency had come to an end.

== See also ==
- 1970s peasant revolts in Thailand
- Communist insurgency in Malaysia (1968–89)
- Vietnam War
- Southern Thailand insurgency
