= Ungphakorn =

Ungphakorn or Ungpakorn (Thai: อึ๊งภากรณ์, RTGS: Uengphakon) is a surname. Notable people with the surname include:

- Giles Ji Ungpakorn (born 1953), Thai political scientist
- Jon Ungphakorn (1947–2025), London-born Thai non-governmental organization executive and politician
- Puey Ungphakorn (1916–1999), Thai economist
