= Red Siam =

The Red Siam Democratic Power Network (Thai: เครือข่ายพลังประชาธิปไตยแดงสยาม), commonly known as Red Siam (Thai: แดงสยาม) is a leftist, militant, anti-monarchy Thai political movement. Red Siam is a splinter group of the pro-democracy Red Shirts movement.

== History ==
In 2009, republican professor Giles Ji Ungpakorn published the Red Siam Manifesto while fleeing Thailand, which openly criticized the monarchy and government.

The manifesto served as inspiration for the Red Siam movement, which was founded in 2009 by Chupong Theethuan, a member of the New Aspiration Party, former communist party member Surachai Danwattananusorn, and former minister Jakrapob Penkair. The movement emerged from the United Front for Democracy Against Dictatorship by members discontented with the Red Shirts movement.

In March 2010, the Red Siam movement was denounced by Red Shirts leaders at a demonstration in Bangkok.

Following the 2014 Thai military coup, the leaders of Red Siam fled to neighboring countries, including Laos.

In March 2024, Jakrapob Penkair, a former minister and leader of Red Siam, returned to Thailand from exile. A vocal advocate for reform of the Thai monarchy, Jakrapob's return was described as a positive sign for democratic renewal in Thailand.

== Leadership ==
- Chupong Theethuan (In exile in France since 2009)
- Surachai Danwattananusorn (In exile in Laos since 2014, disappeared in 2018)
- Jakrapob Penkair (In exile since 2009, returned to Thailand in 2024)
