= Internal Security Operations Command =

Unit of the Thai military devoted to national security issues

- กองอำนวยการรักษาความมั่นคงภายในราชอาณาจักร
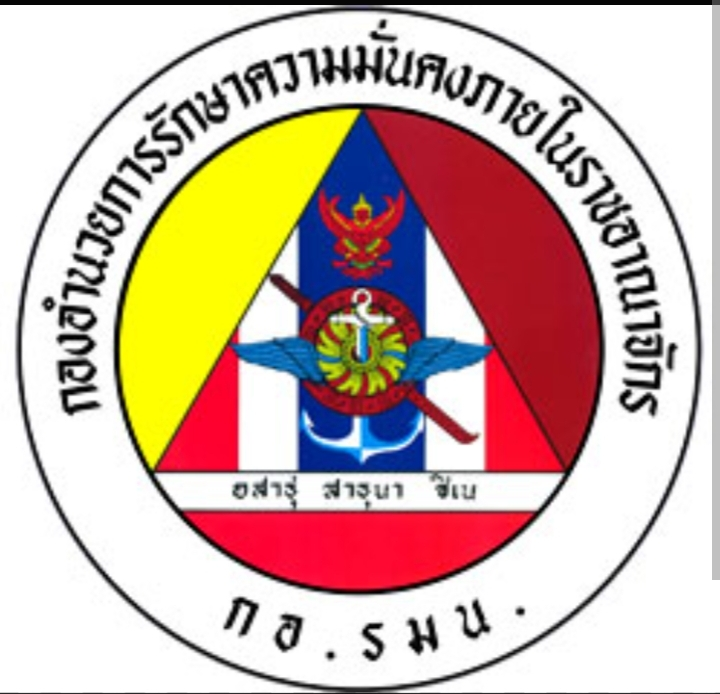

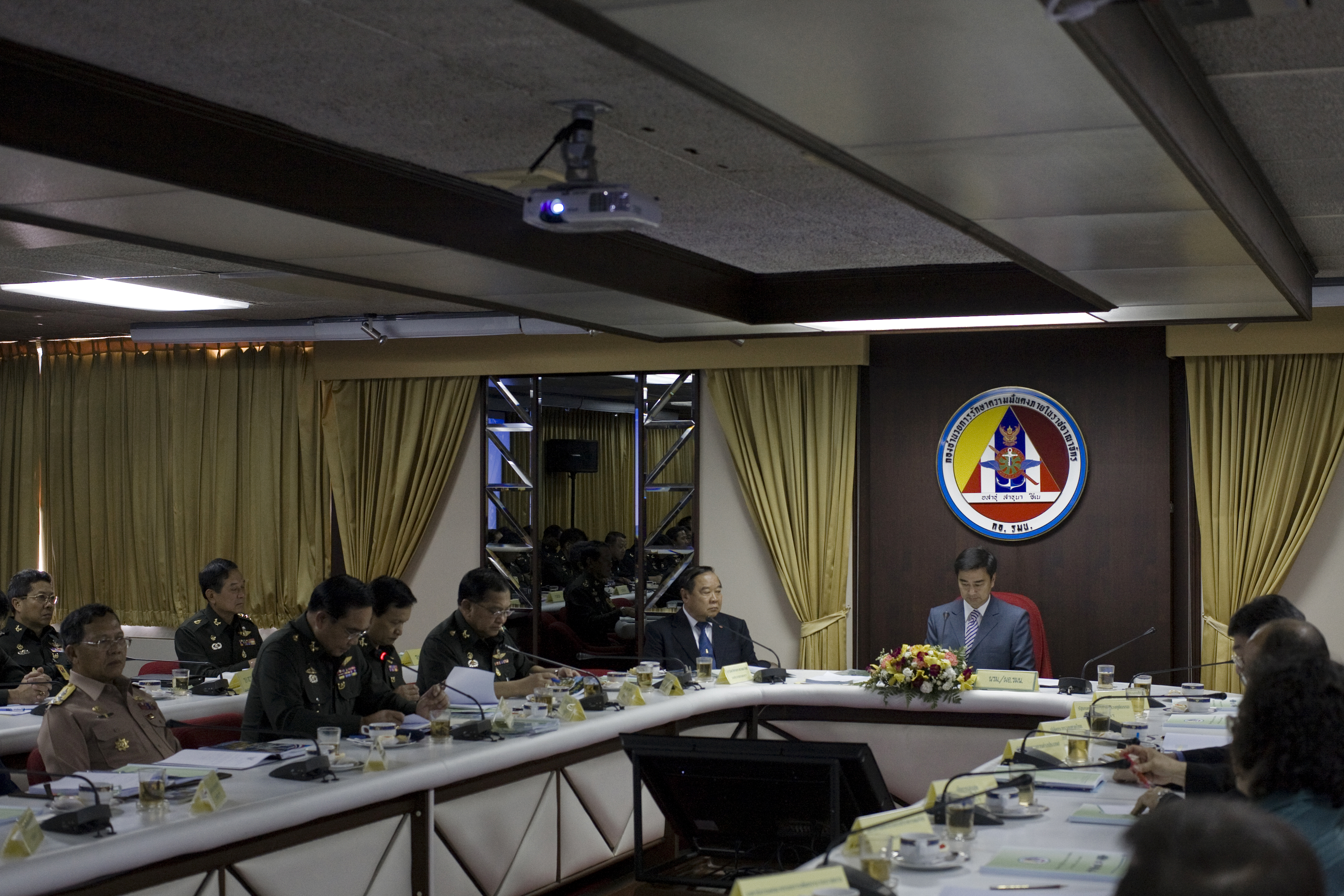
- ISOC meeting with PM Abhisit Vejjajiva in 2011

Agency overview
- Formed: 1965
- Preceding agencies: Central Security Command (CSC); Communist Suppression Operations Command (CSOC)
- Type: Intelligence agency
- Jurisdiction: Nationwide
- Headquarters: Ruen Ruedi Palace Nakhon Ratchasima Rd., Dusit, Bangkok, Thailand
- Motto: Pali: Asādhuṃ Sādhunā Jine ('Conquer evil by the power of good')
- Annual budget: 10,240.1 million baht (FY2019)
- Minister responsible: Anutin Charnvirakul, Director
- Parent agency: Office of the Prime Minister
- Key document: Internal Security Act
- Website: Official website

Internal Security Operations Command (Thai: กองอำนวยการรักษาความมั่นคงภายในราชอาณาจักร; RTGS: kong amnuaikan raksa khwam mankhong phainai ratcha-anachak ) or ISOC (Thai: กอ.รมน.; RTGS: ko o ro mo no) is the internal security agency and political arm of the Royal Thai Armed Forces (RTARF). It was responsible for counterinsurgency, counterintelligence, internal security, and the suppression of leftist groups from the 1960s to the 1980s. During this period it was implicated in atrocities against activists and civilians. ISOC was implicated in a plot to assassinate Prime Minister Thaksin Shinawatra.

After Thaksin was deposed by the 2006 Thai coup d'état, the junta transformed ISOC into a government within a government, giving it wide-reaching authority over the Anti-Money Laundering Office (AMLO), the Department of Special Investigation (DSI), and the National Anti-Corruption Commission (NACC). The junta also authorized it to help provincial authorities in marketing One Tambon One Product (OTOP) products.

In June 2007, the junta approved a draft national security bill which gave ISOC sweeping powers to handle "new forms of threats" to the country. The ISOC revamp modelled it after the United States Department of Homeland Security (DHS) and gave ISOC sweeping new powers to allow the ISOC chief to implement security measures, such as searches without seeking prime ministerial approval.

== History ==
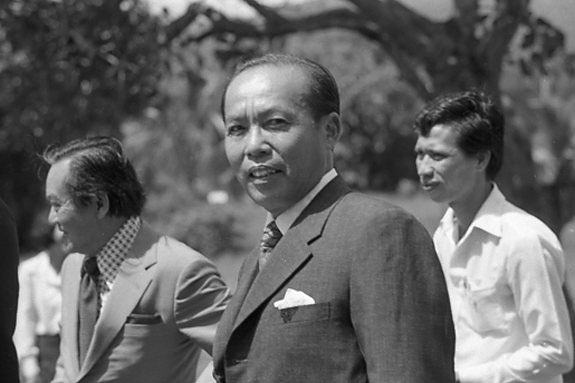
General Saiyud Kerdphol (center) co-founder of ISOC during field operation in 1974

=== Mission and organization ===
The statutory mission of the Internal Security Operations Command (ISOC) encompasses internal security maintenance, counterintelligence, the suppression of threats to national security, and the protection of the public interest. Legally mandated to safeguard the constitutional monarchy, ISOC is tasked with the execution of information and psychological warfare operations, the mitigation of hybrid threats, fostering national cohesion, and providing civil-military assistance during natural disasters. Nominally designated as a civilian-administered agency operating under the aegis of the Office of the Prime Minister (OPM), ISOC’s leadership structure is inherently integrated with the state's executive and military apparatus; the Prime Minister serves ex-officio as the Director of ISOC, while the Commander-in-Chief of the Royal Thai Army concurrently holds the position of Deputy Director.

Within this institutional framework, ISOC's operational doctrines are distinctly bifurcated based on the nature of the threat. In the domain of counterterrorism, ISOC operates strictly through an intelligence-led and strategic coordination framework, functioning as the state's central institutional nexus to synthesize multi-source intelligence, conduct high-level risk assessments, and orchestrate inter-agency response rather than deploying organic tactical assault forces.

Conversely, in the contemporary era following the cessation of the communist insurgency in Thailand, ISOC employs an intelligence-led, comprehensive, and development-based counterinsurgency framework. Rooted in civil-military-police integration and the doctrine of 'politics over military force,' this multi-dimensional approach utilizes unified regional operational commands to synchronize tactical field engagements and community-level human intelligence (HUMINT) gathering with non-kinetic lines of effort, specifically socio-economic development and local engagement.

ISOC's FY2019 budget is 10,240.1 million baht. ISOC has about 5,000-6,000 staff nationwide, excluding those working in the south, and there are 500,000-600,000 internal security volunteers, as well as tens of thousands of people in its information network.

=== Communist Suppression Operations Command ===
Established in 1964 with strategic and logistical assistance from the United States, the Communist Suppression Operations Command (CSOC) was legally mandated to orchestrate and synchronize national counterinsurgency and counterintelligence operations.

During the height of the Cold War and the ensuing communist insurgency in Thailand, Communist Suppression Operations Command (CSOC) functioned not merely as a bureaucratic coordinating body, but as a robust operational headquarters commanding its own organic tactical assets. To effectively neutralize communist guerrilla forces, CSOC developed a multi-layered operational architecture that integrated paramilitary forces for forward combat engagements, state-sponsored mass organizations for village-level population control and local defense, and specialized tactical task forces tasked with executing sensitive counter-guerrilla operations, field intelligence gathering, and psychological warfare. The core trajectory of these integrated operations was designed to ruthlessly suppress communist guerrilla combatants as well as civilian factions suspected of acting as communist sympathizers or clandestine networks.

Following the 17 November 1971 coup by military dictators Thanom Kittikachorn and Praphas Charusathien, Praphas appointed himself interior minister, chief of police, and head of CSOC.

The CSOC was implicated in several atrocities in its 1970s war against leftist groups. This included the Red Drum Massacre, the mass murder of southern Thai activists by burning them alive in gasoline drums.

Student leader Thirayuth Boonmee showed evidence that the destruction of Ban Na Sai village, Bueng Kan District, Nong Khai Province (As of 2011, Bueng Kan Province) in northeast Thailand was the handiwork of the CSOC. The military had earlier claimed that the Communist Party of Thailand (CPT) was responsible for the village's destruction.

CSOC's name was changed to ISOC in 1974.

=== Operations during the 1970s ===
ISOC conducted operations in cities and the Thai countryside to subvert leftist groups through propaganda and violence. In 1973, the ISOC commenced a bombing campaign against hill tribe villages in northern Thailand. To prevent guerrillas from using their forest bases, the ISOC destroyed nearly 6 million rai (9,600 km^{2}) of forest annually between 1973 and 1978.

Prime Minister to-be Prem Tinsulanonda was a senior officer of the ISOC.

ISOC's role declined starting in the early-1980s after the downfall of the CPT. However, it still had great influence. On 1 April 1987, after Prime Minister Kukrit Pramoj claimed that ISOC had been brainwashed by communists, over 200 Thai Army Rangers attacked the prime minister's residence.

== Political intervention ==
=== Plot to assassinate Thaksin Shinawatra ===
ISOC Deputy Director Pallop Pinmanee was sacked after Lieutenant Thawatchai Klinchana, his driver, was found driving a car containing 67 kilograms of explosives near the residence of Prime Minister Thaksin Shinawatra. Pallop denied all involvement, noting that "If I was behind it, I would not have missed." A government spokesperson stated that the explosives in the car were completely assembled, equipped with a remote sensor ready to be detonated, and would have had a blast radius of around one kilometre.

=== Information Operations ===
During a parliamentary debate in February 2020, Viroj Lakkana-adisorn, a Member of Parliament representing the Future Forward Party (FFP), tabled declassified official documents detailing the budgetary allocations of the Internal Security Operations Command (ISOC).

The disclosed data illuminated the precise fiscal distribution assigned to counterinsurgency, counterintelligence, and emergency management—specifically civil assistance and disaster mitigation. Furthermore, the documentation exposed the financial outlays earmarked for human development, humanitarian aid, and information and psychological warfare operations within the conflict-pervaded southern border provinces of Pattani, Narathiwat, and Yala, which remain heavily impacted by the protracted South Thailand insurgency.

Furthermore, three ancillary exhibits meticulously detailed directives issued by the Ministry of Defense to execute information operations (IO) and psychological warfare targeting opposition political parties and dissident politicians; these records explicitly delineated fiscal appropriations for telecommunications infrastructure, digital bandwidth, and mobile internet connectivity. In response to these revelations, and given that the Internal Security Operations Command operates under the direct statutory oversight of the Office of the Prime Minister, General Prayut Chan-o-cha categorically denied all allegations of state-sponsored cyber-surveillance and political interference, pledging a formal administrative investigation to verify the authenticity of the tabled evidence.

In October 2020, Twitter took down a "low-intensity" Royal Thai Army (RTA) information warfare operations apparently designed to stifle and influence democratic opinion on social media regarding Army scandals and democratic processes in the country, as part of a major wider investigation by Facebook and Twitter into attempts to influence the 2020 US Presidential Election.

== ISOC with Thailand's coup ==
=== Post-2006 coup ISOC ===
ISOC received a boost when the 2006 coup installed the government of General Surayud Chulanont. His government passed the Internal Security Act, 2008, granting ISOC the status of a state organization reporting to the Office of the Prime Minister.

Thaksin planned a major restructuring of the ISOC prior to the coup which overthrew him in September 2006. Soon after the coup, the junta released three army suspects in the car bomb plot. Junta leader and Army Commander-in-Chief General Sonthi Boonyaratglin appointed himself head of ISOC (its previous head had been the prime minister) and transformed ISOC into a "government within a government". The new ISOC was criticized as being a shadowy puppet master pulling the strings of existing agencies, answerable to no one but its leader.

To protect people in south Thailand from South Thailand insurgency situations, ISOC produced Jatukham Rammathep amulets for distribution to the Buddhist minority. The renowned animist amulets were believed to have magical powers to protect their wearers from violence and large sums are paid for them. The plan was developed by Colonel Manas Khongpan, deputy director of ISOC in Yala Province.

The cabinet of General Surayud Chulanont gave 732 ISOC staff members an 84.3 million baht "reward" in mid-2007. ISOC explained that police and soldiers were temporarily transferred to support ISOC's operation. ISOC wanted to reward them for their hard work and sacrifice. ISOC had originally requested the reward in 2003, but was turned down by the Thaksin government.

=== Post-2014 coup ISOC ===
Following the 2014 coup, junta leader Prayut Chan-o-cha used ISOC to handle not just military matters, but also political and social issues. In 2017, Prayut issued National Council for Peace and Order (NCPO) Order 51/2017 to bolster ISOC's powers. A key provision was the inclusion of public prosecutors under ISOC's ageis, marking ISOC's first involvement in the Thai justice system. The order also gave ISOC the power to summon citizens to provide "information", a function formerly seen as a police responsibility. ISOC, under the order, is also responsible for "social order", a task previously shared by the police and ministries.

In October 2019, ISOC filed sedition charges against 12 opposition politicians and academics, including leaders of Future Forward and Pheu Thai parties. They were accused of inciting insurrection against the state for discussing amendments to the junta-drafted 2017 constitution on 28 September in Pattani Province. Their choice of venue is unfortunate as Pattani operates under a "state of emergency" enacted by the army to combat local separatists. This means that the defendants may be tried in a military tribunal. A leading Thai political scientist warned that giving a militarized surveillance agency free rein in internal security issues risked turning Thailand into a totalitarian state.

== ISOC Bases ==
- Ruen Ruedi Palace in Bangkok is the headquarters of ISOC.
- The Site of Fort Sirindhorn in Yarang District of Pattani Province is the headquarters of ISOC Area 4.

== See also ==
- Office of the Prime Minister (Thailand)
- Deep State
- Operation Gladio
- The King Never Smile
