= Communist Party of Thailand =

1942–1990s political party in Thailand

Communist Party of Thailand พรรคคอมมิวนิสต์แห่งประเทศไทย
- Abbreviation: CPT
- Governing body: Central Committee
- Founded: 1942
- Dissolved: Inactive since the early 1990s
- Split from: South Seas Communist Party
- Newspaper: Mahachon
- Military wing: People's Liberation Army of Thailand
- Radio: Voice of the People of Thailand
- Membership: ▲10,000–12,000 (1970 estimates)
- Ideology: Communism; Marxism–Leninism; Mao Zedong Thought; Revolutionary socialism
- Political position: Far-left

Party flag

The Communist Party of Thailand (Abrv: CPT; Thai: พรรคคอมมิวนิสต์แห่งประเทศไทย, RTGS: Phak Khommiwnit Haeng Prathet Thai) was a Marxist-Leninist and Maoist party in Thailand active from 1942 until the early 1990s. Following the Fall of Phnom Penh, Saigon and Vientiane to Marxist–Leninist forces like the Khmer Rouge (Cambodian Reds), Viet Cong and Pathet Lao. Thailand found itself entirely bordered by the three communist nations, drastically escalating the geopolitical stakes in Southeast Asia.

The CPT was officially founded on 1 December 1942, although communist activism in Thailand began as early as 1927. In the 1960s, the party expanded its membership and influence. By the early 1970s, it had become one of the largest communist movements in mainland Southeast Asia, fueled by the rise of Marxist-Leninist takeovers through Indochina in 1975 such as Cambodia, Vietnam and Laos. The CPT launched a guerrilla insurgency against the Thai government in 1965. At its peak, the party operated semi-autonomously in rural areas, with an estimated 10 to 12,000 armed fighters and a significant network of sympathizers, possibly numbering in the millions. Its influence was concentrated in northeastern, northern, and southern Thailand. The CPT declined following a combination of internal divisions, changes in international communist alliances, effective counter-insurgency campaigns by the Thai government (including amnesty programs for party cadres), and the end of the Cold War. By the early 1990s, the party had largely ceased to exist as an organized political force.

== Early years ==
The origins of the communist movement in Thailand can be traced to the Siam Special Committee of the South Seas Communist Party, established around 1926 to 1927 The arrival of leftist activists fleeing China after the 1927 split between the Communist and the Nationalists further bolstered communist activity in Thailand. Sources indicate that between late 1929 and early 1930, the Communist Party of Siam was formally established, laying the foundation for later communist organization in the country.

During its early years, the Communist Party of Siam remained a small organization, primarily composed of intellectuals in Bangkok. By early 1948, British intelligence described reports claiming the party had 3.000 members nationwide as "exaggerated." The party was briefly legal between 1946 and 1948. Its secret headquarters were located in a wooden building on Si Phraya Road in Bangkok.

Key figures during this period included Udom Srisuwan, the party's principal theorist.

In February 1951, a CPT delegation attended the second national congress of the Vietnam Workers' Party (VPW) in Tuyên Quang.The CPT subsequently held its second party congress in 1952.

Another prominent leader was Phayom Chulanont, a former Thai Army general and Member of Parliament for Phetburi. In 1957, he defected to go underground, adopting the nom de guerre Comrade Too Khamtan (สหายตู้คำตัน).

He later became a member of the CPT's Central Committee and Chief of Staff of the People's Liberation Army of Thailand. His son, Surayud Chulanont, would later become a general and political leader in Thailand.

== Insurgency ==
The CPT held its third party congress in September 1961. Shortly afterward, Ruam Wongphan, one of the leaders, was arrested and executed.

The Voice of the People of Thailand (VOPT), a CPT radio station, was established in Yunnan, southern China in March 1962.

In the Sino-Soviet split, the CPT sided with the Chinese Communist Party (CCP). In October 1964, its position was made clear in a congratulatory message on the occasion of the 15th anniversary of the People's Republic of China. Ideologically, the party aligned with Maoism and formulated a policy of armed struggle along the lines of the Chinese experience, which was made public in 1964. The party condemned the Communist Party of the Soviet Union as revisionist and socially imperialist. As of 1966, relations with the Communist Party of Vietnam began to deteriorate, as the CPT criticized the CPV for failing to take a clear pro-CCP stance.

The party launched the Thai Patriotic Front (TPF) on 1 January 1965. The TPF had a six-point programme for peace and neutrality. The Front called for the formation of a patriotic and democratic government, and opposed the Thai government and US troop presence in Thailand. The TPF was poised to fill the role of the united front in the triangular setting of the people's war strategy (party-army-front).

Low intensity armed struggle began in August 1965 when the party declared through VOPT that "an era of armed struggle had begun". Concomitantly, the party began armed actions in the Na Kae District of Nakhon Phanom Province. At the time it was estimated that the party had around 1,200 armed fighters under its command.

During this time, a notable CPT figure was Chit Phumisak, a revolutionary and intellectual. He had translated The Communist Manifesto into Thai in the 1950s, and had been jailed from 1957 to 1963 under the Sarit dictatorship. Upon his release he joined the party and took part in its struggle in the Sakhon Nakhon Province. He was killed by government officials on May 5, 1966 but went on to become an iconic figure in Thailand's left-wing movement.

In February and August 1967, the Thai government conducted a number of counter-insurgency raids in Bangkok and Thonburi, arresting 30 CPT members including secretary-general Thong Chaemsri.

Opposition to US military presence in Thailand was a key element of the CPT during the Vietnam War. The CPT alleged that Thailand was a neocolonial country under US control. Emphasis was thus given to the struggle for national independence. As of 1968, the theory of neocolonialism was rejected by large sections of the party, who were inspired by Maoist positions arguing that Thailand was a semi-colonial country.

As of 1968, the CPT guerrilla network consisted of less than 4,000 armed fighters, scattered across the northern mountains and other periphery regions. The CPT guerrilla had limited links to outside support.

In 1969, the Supreme Command of the People's Liberation Army of Thailand was formed, marking a new phase in the build-up of guerrilla forces. The armed struggle had spread to various districts in the north in the Phetchabun Mountains and the Phi Pan Nam Range. The armed forces of the party had also established a presence along the border with Malaysia, in the areas were the armed forces of the Communist Party of Malaya was based.

In July 1969, nine CPT members were arrested, including a high-ranking Central Committee member. The arrests were presented by the government as a crucial victory over the party.

== Peak ==
From 1970 on, the People's Liberation Army of Thailand (PLAT) received significant logistical support from China and Vietnam. PLAT forces intensified their operations, including attacks on US Air Force bomber bases in the country.

The Thai government deployed over 12,000 troops to the country's northern provinces in January 1972, carrying out a six-week operation in which over 200 militants were killed. The government's casualties during the operation amounted to 30 soldiers killed and 100 wounded.

In late 1972, the Royal Thai Army, police, and volunteer defence forces committed the Red Drum killings of more than 200 (unofficial accounts speak of up to 3,000) civilians who were accused of supporting communists in Tambon Lam Sai, Phatthalung Province, southern Thailand. The massacre was probably ordered by the government's Communist Suppression Operations Command (CSOC).

It was only one example "of a pattern of widespread abuse of power by the army and enforcement agencies" during the brutal anti-communist operations of 1971–1973 that took an official death toll of 3,008 civilians throughout the country (while unofficial estimates are between 1,000 and 3,000 in Phatthalung Province alone).Those killed were accused of working with the CPT. Until that point, communist suspects arrested by soldiers were normally shot by the roadside. The "red oil drum" technique was later introduced to eliminate any possible evidence. Suspects were clubbed to a point of semi-consciousness before being dumped in gasoline-filled, used oil drums and burnt alive. The 200 litre red drums had an iron grille divider with a fire below and the suspect above.

In the wake of the 14 October 1973 movement came mass protests by farmers and their allies such as students and professional classes who challenged the ruling elite to improve the lives of farmers.

Led by the newly formed Farmers Federation of Thailand, the revolt antagonized landowners and state officials. In response, activists were harassed and murders were to follow. Between March 1974 and September 1979, 21 FFT leaders were assassinated with the killings concentrated in the Chiang Mai region. The assassination of FFT leaders created an environment of pervasive fear in the countryside and ended the revolutionary efforts of the group.

During Thailand's democratic period between 1973 and 1976 many groups were radicalised and socialist groups such as the Socialist Party of Thailand, the Socialist Front, the New Force Party and the Labour Party were all able to get members elected to the country's parliament.

The year 1975 was a watershed moment in geopolitical history, marking the collapse of Western-backed governments and the rise of Marxist–Leninist regimes in Indochina. Following the departure of French colonial power and the subsequent defeat of the United States intervention, the communist movements successfully seized control of Cambodia by the Khmer Rouge (Cambodian Reds) in Phnom Penh, Vietnam by the Viet Cong in Saigon and Laos by the Pathet Lao in Vientiane. Thailand's neighbors had fallen to socialist regimes as the Asian Domino theory, which then borders Thailand and surrounded by three communist nations such as the Communist Party of Kampuchea (CPK), the Communist Party of Vietnam (CPV) and Lao People's Revolutionary Party (LPRV) backed by Moscow from the Soviet Union (USSR) and Beijing from China.

In the aftermath of the 6 October 1976 Massacre at Thammasat University and in the climate of increasing repression after the military take-over of the country, the CPT was able to expand its membership base.

Many of the new recruits were students, workers, intellectuals, farmers or cadres of the Socialist Party of Thailand (SPT) whose leader Boonsanong Punyodyana had also been murdered on 28 February 1976.

More than 1,000 students joined the party, including most elected campus representatives throughout the country. A large section of the newly recruited members received political and military training in PLAT camps in Laos. Instructors were Thai, Lao, and Vietnamese.

The political folk-rock group Caravan also fled to the jungles to link-up with the CPT at this time. Another who fled was Phumtham Wechayachai, who some 50 years later served as Thailand's acting prime minister.

In many cases, students accustomed to urban life had difficulties adapting to the harsh realities of guerrilla struggle, and thus the party decided to place many of them in villages rather deep in the jungle. The new student recruits were divided into groups of five to ten, which were distributed along the approximately 250 "liberated villages" of the country.

By 1977, the party had an estimated 6,000 to 8,000 armed fighters, and about a million sympathizers. Half of the provinces of the country were declared "communist infiltrated" by official Thai sources at the time.

The entry of leftist intellectuals to the party strengthened its capability to pursue united front policies. Following the expansion of its membership, the CPT began to stretch out a hand to wider sections of Thai society for forming a broad democratic front. On 7 May 1977, the SPT declared that it would cooperate in armed struggle with the CPT. On 2 July, the two parties declared the formation of a united front.

On 4 October, VOPT declared that the formation of the Committee for Coordination of Patriotic and Democratic Forces had taken place on 28 September. The nine-member coordination committee consisted of

- Chairman: Udom Srisuwan (CPT Central Committee Member)
- Vice Chairman: Boonyen Wothong (SPT)
- Committee Member: Monkon Na Nakhon (CPT)
- Committee Member: Therdphum Chaidee
- Committee Member: Sithon Yotkantha (farmers movement)
- Committee Member: Samak Chalikun (Socialist Front)
- Committee Member: Chamni Sakdiset
- Spokesman and Committee Member: Sri Inthapathi (formerly working for the Public Relations Department of the government)
- Secretary: Thirayut Boonmi (students movement and editor of Samakhi Surop (United to Fight), a magazine being circulated among students and intellectuals both in Thailand and abroad).

Also allied to the CPT at the time were the Thai Moslem People's Liberation Armed Forces and the National Student Center of Thailand, which was led by Seksan Prasertkul.

The military and political growth of the party would however be hampered by developments wider afield. The party depended on support from states and communist parties in neighbouring countries, and as international alliances shifted the CPT found itself vulnerable.

In late 1978, the Sino-Soviet split developed into armed hostilities in Southeast Asia as war broke out between Vietnam and Kampuchea, two countries that supported the CPT. Laos, a country which hosted many PLAT bases, sided with Vietnam in the dispute. In January 1979, the CPT and PLAT were expelled from Laos by the government, a military setback for the party. Bunyen Worthong and a small section of other ex-student leaders and intellectuals broke with the party leadership and on 22 October 1979, they formed the Thai Isan Liberation Party (generally called Pak Mai, the 'New Party') in Vientiane. Pak Mai was a communist party that supported Vietnamese-Laotian positions and was based in Laos.

Initially, the CPT adopted a neutral stance in the conflict between Vietnam and Kampuchea, causing relations to deteriorate with both the Chinese and the Vietnamese parties. However, as Vietnam intervened militarily in Kampuchea, the CPT condemned the Vietnamese action in a statement issued on 7 June 1979.

As diplomatic and trade relations between Thailand and China improved, and Thai and Chinese governments found a common enemy in pro-Soviet Vietnam, moral and logistical support for the CPT by the Chinese declined sharply. The Chinese Communist Party began advising the CPT to tone down their revolutionary discourse against the Thai government in their radio broadcasts and to support Democratic Kampuchean forces against the Vietnamese. On 10 July 1979, VOPT declared that it would cease to its broadcasting service. On 11 July, the last VOPT broadcast was transmitted. Renmin Ribao carried a congratulatory message from the CPT on the 30th anniversary of the People's Republic of China on 30 September, which called for militant unity between Thai and Chinese communists, but thereafter news about the CPT in Chinese media became scarce.

== Decline ==
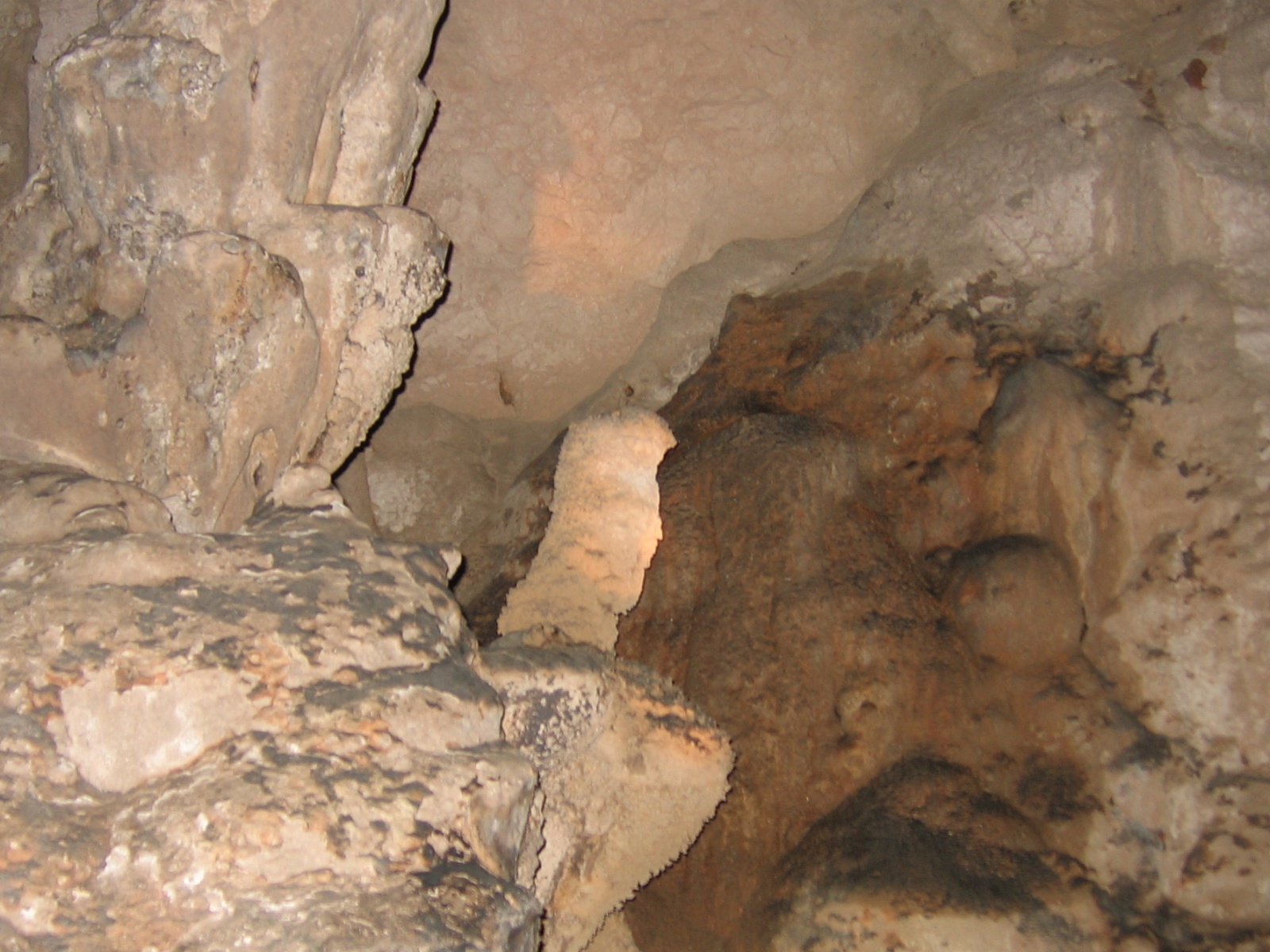
Speleothem inside Ta Ko Bi Cave, a cave in Umphang District, used as a base by CPT guerrillas

In 1980, the Thai government adopted a government order, "66/2523", encouraging CPT cadres to defect. Communist cadres were eventually granted amnesty.

In March 1981, the Socialist Party of Thailand broke off relations with the CPT, claiming that CPT was controlled by foreign influences.

In April 1981, the CPT leadership sought talks with the Thai government. The government responded that CPT fighters had to demobilize before any talks could be initiated. In a declaration on 25 October 1981, Major General Chavalit Yongchaiyudh, the director of the Thai Army Operations Department, said that the war against CPT armed forces was approaching its end as all major bases of the PLAT in the north and northeast had been destroyed.

In 1982, the government, under Prime Minister General Prem Tinsulanonda, issued another executive order, 65/2525, offering amnesty to CPT-PLAT fighters.

In 1982–1983, CPT experienced mass defections of its cadres, and its military potential was severely reduced. Many of those who defected in the early 1980s were the students and intellectuals who had joined CPT after the 1976 massacre. The defectors generally rejected the Maoist ideological positions of the CPT, arguing that Thailand was emerging as an industrial nation and the peasant war strategy had to be abandoned.

Damri Ruangsutham, an influential politburo member, and Surachai Sae Dan, a leading figure of the party in southern Thailand, were captured by state forces at that time.

There have been no reports of CPT activity since the beginning of the 1990s. The exact fate of the party is not known, and it remains banned to this day.

Before the 2019 election, a group filed documents to establish a party with the name "Communist Party of Thailand" (CPOT) but this was denied by the Election Commission of Thailand due to the name indicating undemocratic ideology.

== Party organization ==
The party was led by a seven-member politburo, elected by a 25-member Central Committee. Under the Central Committee were various provincial (changwat) committees and under them district (amphoe) committees. At the local level there were tambon (subdistrict) and muban (village) party structures.

Information on the leadership of the CPT is scarce. The CPT itself was always secretive about the identity of its leaders. According to a 1977 Kampuchean document, it was claimed that the General Secretary of the CPT was Khamtan (nom de guerre of Phayom Chulanont). Other sources mention "Comrade Samanan" (Jaroen Wanngam) as the party leader during the same period.

== Ethnic composition ==
Prior to the formation of the Communist Party of Siam, the Chinese Communist Party had an active exile branch working among ethnic Chinese in the country. The party obtained legal status in 1946, and had a major influence on trade unions and Chinese students. The party had around 2,000 active members and another 3,000 sympathizers in Siam. After the establishment of the People's Republic of China in 1949 most ethnic Chinese communists in Thailand joined the CPT. From 1949 until 1976, the party membership was largely ethnically Chinese. Following the rapid expansion of the party following the 1976 massacre, ethnic Thais came to constitute the majority of party members. There was also a strong presence of other ethnic minorities in the party ranks. While many Hmongs in neighbouring Laos tended to side with anti-communist forces, the CPT was able to build a strong base among Hmong people in Thailand.

== See also ==
- Mahachon (newspaper)
- Caravan (folk-rock band)
- Chit Phumisak
- Chiranan Pitpreecha
- Phayon Chulanont
- Phumtham Wechayachai
- Prasert Sapsunthon
- Seksan Prasertkul
- Surachai Danwattananusorn
- Thirayuth Boonmee
- List of anti-revisionist groups
