= Chit Phumisak =

Thai author and activist (1930–1966)

- จิตร ภูมิศักดิ์
- Born: Somchit Phumisak Thai: สมจิตร ภูมิศักดิ์ 25 September 1930; Prachantakham, Prachinburi, Siam
- Died: 5 May 1966 (aged 35); Waritchaphum, Sakon Nakhon, Thailand
- Occupations: Author; philologist; historian; poet; songwriter
- Parents: Siri Phumisak (father); Saeng-ngoen Chayawong (mother)

Signature
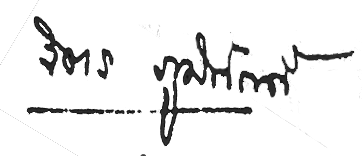

Chit Phumisak (also spelt Jit Poumisak; Thai: จิตร ภูมิศักดิ์, pronounced [tɕìt pʰūː.mí.sàk]; 25 September 1930 – 5 May 1966) was a Thai Marxist historian, activist, author, philologist, poet, songwriter, and communist revolutionary. His most influential book was Chomna Sakdina Thai, written in 1957 under the pseudonym Somsamai Sisutphan (สมสมัย ศรีศูทรพรรณ). Other pen names used by Chit include Kawi Kanmueang (กวีการเมือง) and Kawi Si Sayam (กวี ศรีสยาม). He has been described as the "Che Guevara of Thailand".

== Biography ==
Chit Phumisak at Angkor Wat in Cambodia

Born into a poor family in Prachinburi Province, eastern Thailand, he studied philology and history at Chulalongkorn University in Bangkok. It was as a student that Chit first became exposed to Marxism; in 1953 he was hired by the U.S. embassy to help assist William J. Gedney, an American linguist working in Thailand, to translate The Communist Manifesto into Thai (in an attempt to scare the Thai government into taking a tougher stance against communism).

His writings were anti-nationalist and progressive and were viewed as a threat to the state by the harshly anti-communist government of Sarit Thanarat. He was arrested in 1957, branded a communist, and after six years in jail was declared not guilty by a court and set free.

In 1965, he joined the Communist Party of Thailand, headquartered in the jungles of the Phu Phan Mountains, in Sakhon Nakhon Province. On May 5, 1966 he was shot dead by government officials near the village Nong Kung in Waritchaphum district. His body was burned and no proper ceremony for his death occurred until 1989, when his remains were finally placed in a stupa at the nearby Wat Prasittisangwon.

Paul M. Handley, the author of the 2006 book The King Never Smiles, states that Chit was executed by government officials near the Phu Phan Mountains shortly after he was released from jail.

== Selected works ==
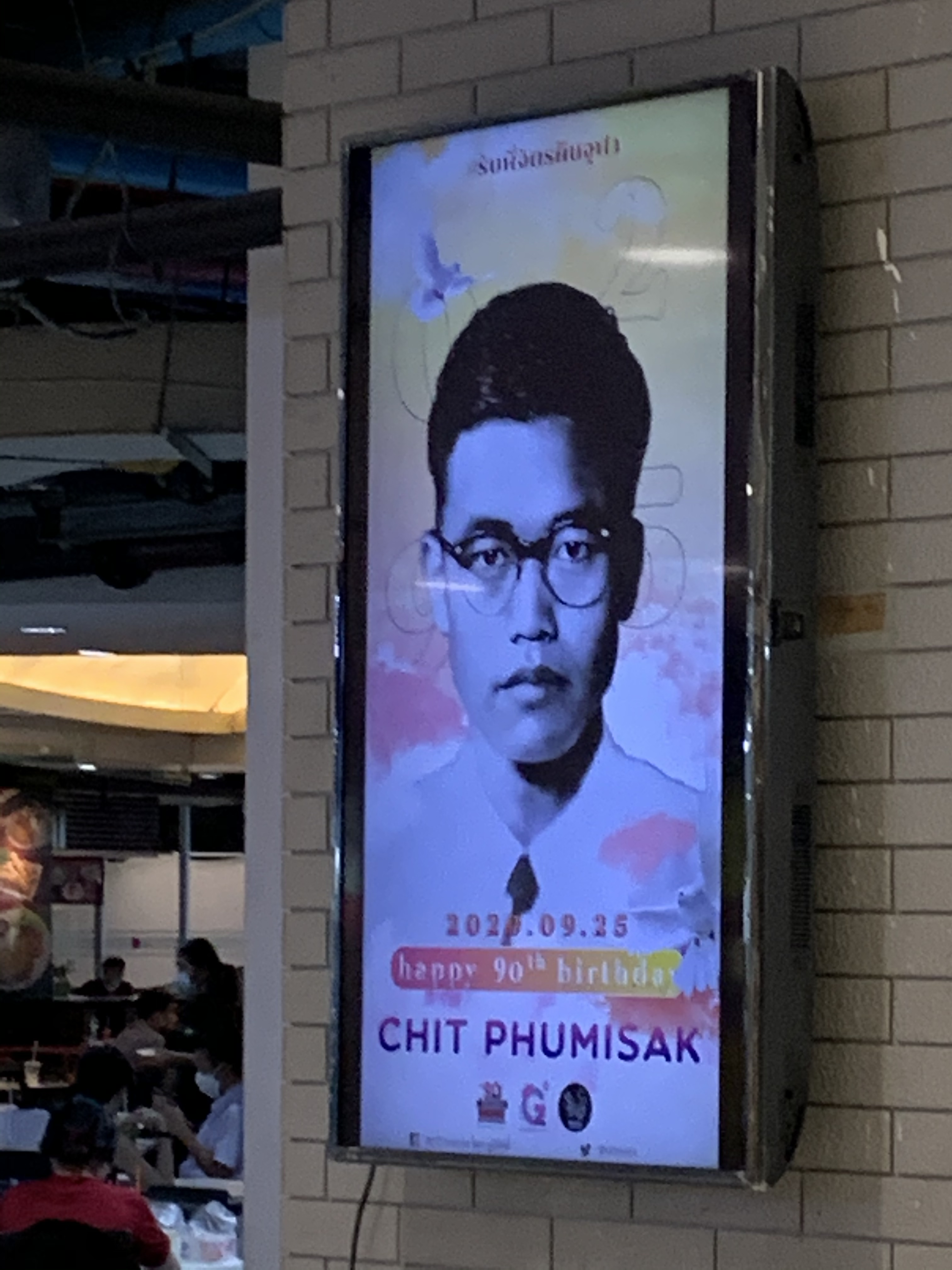
A birthday billboard for Chit’s 2020 birthday in Bangkok

- โฉมหน้าศักดินาไทย (Chomna Sakdina Thai; "The Real Face of Thai Feudalism")
- รวมบทกวีและงานวิจารณ์ศิลปวรรณคดีของกวีการเมือง (Ruam botkawi lae ngan wichan sinlapa wannakhadi khong Kawi Kanmueang; "Collected Poems and Literary Reviews by 'Political Poet'"), under pseudonym "Kawi Kanmueang"
- ความเป็นมาของคำสยาม ไทย, ลาว และขอม และลักษณะทางสังคมของชื่อชนชาติ (Khwampenma khong kham Sayam Thai Lao lae Khom lae laksana thangsangkhom khong chue chonchat; "Etymology of the terms Siam, Thai, Lao, and Khom, and the Social Characteristics of Demonyms")
- ตำนานนครวัด ("Tamnan nakhon wat"; "The History of Angkor Wat")
- เพลง "แสงดาวแห่งศรัทธา" ("Phleng Saengdao Haeng Sattha"; "Song of the Stars of Faith")
- เพลง "ภูพานปฏิวัติ" ("Phleng Phuphan Patiwat"; "Song of the Revolution of Phuphan")
