= Phayom Chulanont =

Thai communist leader (1909–1980)

- พโยม จุลานนท์
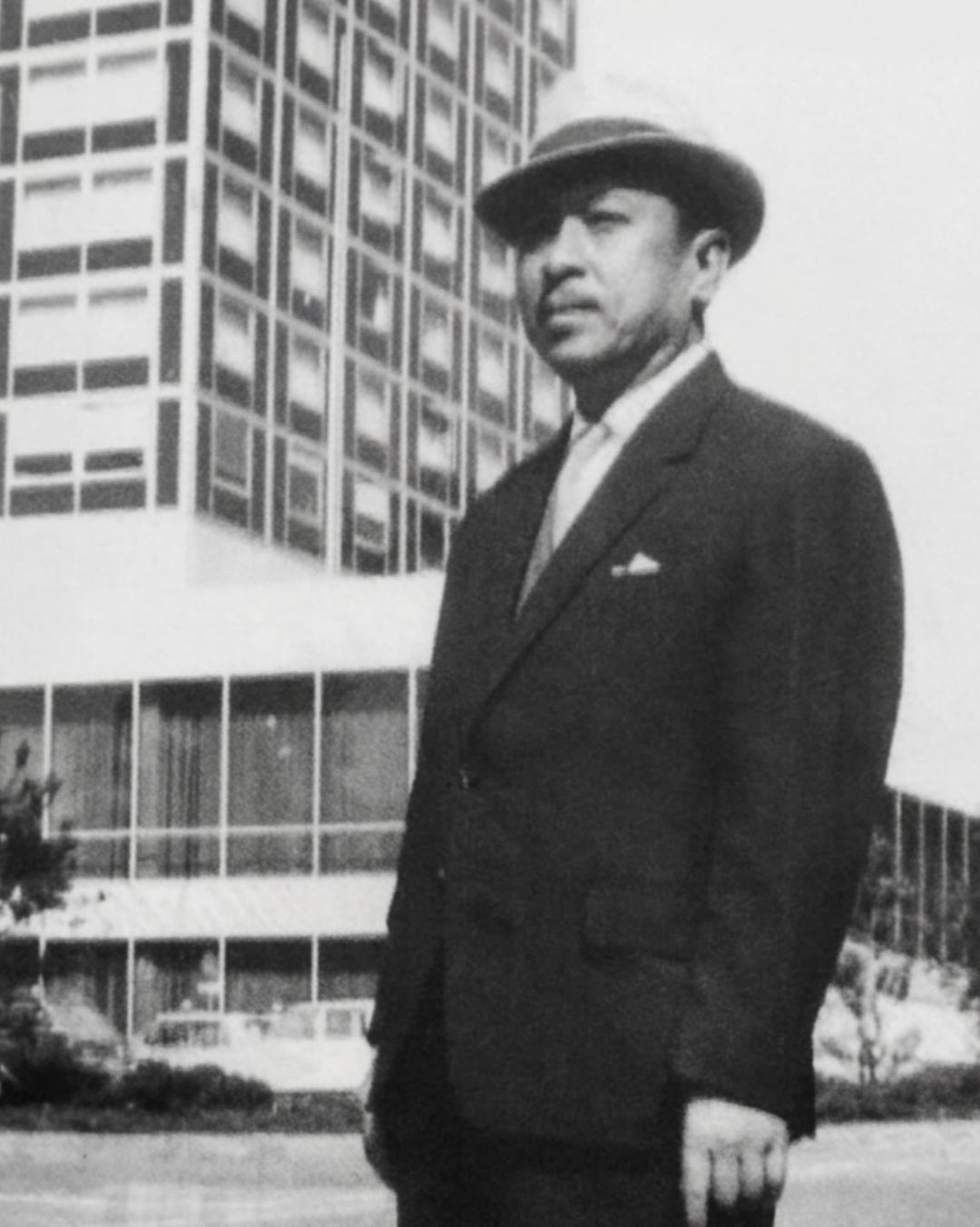

Member of the House of Representatives
- In office 29 January 1948 – 29 November 1951
- Constituency: Phetchaburi-1

Personal details
- Born: 12 March 1909 Ban Tha Hin, Phetchaburi province, Siam
- Died: 7 September 1980 (aged 71) Beijing, China
- Party: Communist Party of Thailand
- Children: 3 (including Surayud Chulanont)
- Nickname: Too Khamtan (nom de guerre)

Military service
- Allegiance: Kingdom of Thailand (until 1957); Communist Party of Thailand
- Branch/service: Royal Thai Army (until 1957); People's Liberation Army of Thailand
- Rank: Lieutenant Colonel
- Battles/wars: Boworadet rebellion; Franco-Thai War; 1947 Thai coup d'état; Communist insurgency in Thailand

Phayom Chulanont (Thai: พ.ท.พโยม จุลานนท์; 12 March 1909 – 7 September 1980) was a Thai military officer, politician, and leader of the Communist Party of Thailand. He was the father of former Prime Minister Surayud Chulanont.

== Early life ==
Phayom Chulanont was born in Ban Tha Hin, Phetchaburi province, Siam, on 12 March 1909 to Phraya Wisetsinghanat and Khunying Wisetsinghanat. His father was an officer in the Royal Thai Army. King Vajiravudh granted the family the surname Chulanont to Phayom's grandthaer, who was a military instructor at the Front Palace under Pinklao. Chulanont attended Wat Pom School in the Tha Phra subdistrict and graduated from the Chulachomklao Royal Military Academy in 1931.

== Career ==
=== Early military ===
Chulanont became a second lieutenant in the 2nd Artillery Regiment in Ratchaburi Province. He was an officer in a tank unit stationed at the Parusgawan Palace during the Siamese revolution of 1932. He became chief of staff of the 5th Infantry Regiment in the 2nd Infantry Division. He fought against the Japanese invasion of Thailand. He was made chief of staff of the 3rd Infantry Regiment in 1943, and patrolled along Siam's border with Burma and China. He was made chief of staff of the 18th Infantry Regiment in 1944.

=== Politics ===
Chulanont resigned from the military in order to run for a seat in the House of Representatives during the 1946 election. Phraya Suraphanthaseni defeated him in the election and Chulanont lost to Yeu Pholchan in a by-election held on 6 August 1946. He was elected to the house in the 1948 election and was made Secretary to the Minister of Defense.

=== Insurgency ===
Chulanont was a lieutenant-colonel in the Royal Thai Army by 1947. Chulanont fled Siam in the wake of the failure of the 1947 coup d'état and went to China. He used the alias Sahai Khamtan.

Chulanont established the Thai Patriotic Front, another Thai communist organization, on 1 January 1965. Chulanont represented the organisation in China. After decades of hiding and guerilla warfare, Phayom's health failed him. He was sent to recuperate in Beijing in 1978, and later died in China on 7 September 1980.

== Personal life ==
Chulanont married Amphoch Chulanon, with whom he had three children; she was the daughter of Phraya Si Sitthisongkhram. One of his children was Surayud Chulanont, who served as a general in the Thai military and as Prime Minister of Thailand.

== Works cited ==
=== Books ===
- Galway, Matthew; Opper, Marc (2022). Experiments with Marxism-Leninism in Cold War Southeast Asia. ANU Press. ISBN 9781760465292.

=== Journals ===
- Girling, J. (1968). "Northeast Thailand: Tomorrow's Viet Nam?". Foreign Affairs. 46 (2). Council on Foreign Relations: 388–397. doi:10.2307/20039308. JSTOR 20039308.

=== News ===
- พ.ท.พโยม จุลานนท์ "สหายคำตัน" ตำนานผู้กล้าเลือดเมืองเพชร [Lt. Col. Payom Chulanont, "Comrade Khamtan," a legendary hero from Phetchaburi.]. Phetchaburi Phetchaburi News (in Thai). Archived from the original on 6 April 2020.

=== Web ===
- Bartlett, Merrill (1973). "The Communist Insurgency In Thailand". Marine Corps Association. Archived from the original on 1 October 2015.
