= South Seas Communist Party =

South Seas Communist Party 南洋共產黨
- Abbreviation: SSCP
- Founded: 1925
- Dissolved: 1930
- Split from: Chinese Communist Party
- Succeeded by: Communist Party of Indochina, Malayan Communist Party, Communist Party of Siam
- Headquarters: Singapore
- Ideology: Communism
- Political position: Far-left

The South Seas Communist Party (SSCP), also known as the Nanyang Communist Party (Chinese: 南洋共產黨), was a communist party across the countries and European colonies in Southeast Asia. The SSCP was established by members of the overseas branch of the Chinese Communist Party and left-wing members of Kuomintang in 1928. The SSCP ceased to exist in 1930, and was succeeded by the Malayan Communist Party and Communist Party of Thailand.

== History ==
An overseas branch of the Chinese Communist Party (CCP), the Nanyang Regional, was established in Singapore in 1926. Within the Kuomintang there was a left-wing faction. The Malayan Revolution Committee and the South Seas General Labour Union in Singapore were founded in the 1920s. Left-wing members of the Kuomintang left and formed the South Seas Communist Party (SSCP) or Nanyang Communist Party in 1928. The South Seas General Labour Union and Nanyang Regionalin Singapore also participated in the formation of the SSCP.

The SSCP branch in Thailand was managed from Singapore. This organisation later became the Communist Party of Thailand, but was almost entirely Vietnamese with only 5-7 Thai being recruited from 1930 to 1936.

The British believed that the SSCP was controlled by the CCP and was active in Thailand, Burma, and the colonies of the British, Dutch, and French.

At the Third Representatives' Congress on 28 April 1930, the SSCP was transformed into the Malayan Communist Party. Communist parties in Thailand and the Dutch East Indies were under the command of the MCP.

== See also ==
- History of the Chinese Communist Party

== Works cited ==
=== Books ===
- Guan, Ang (2018). Southeast Asia’s Cold War: An Interpretive History. University of Hawai'i Press. ISBN 9780824873462.
- Kheng, Cheah (1992). From PKI to the Comintern, 1924–1941: The Apprenticeship of the Malayan Communist Party. Cornell University Press. ISBN 9781501719318.
- McLane, Charles (1966). Soviet Strategies in Southeast Asia: An Exploration of Eastern Policy under Lenin and Stalin. Princeton University Press. ISBN 9781400879663.

=== Journals ===
- Suryanrayan, V. (1977). "Rise of Communism in Malaya (1930-1948)". Proceedings of the Indian History Congress. 38. Indian History Congress: 613–620. doi:10.2307/44139123. JSTOR 44139123.
- Wedel, Yuangrat (1981). "The Communist Party of Thailand and Thai Radical Thought". Southeast Asian Affairs. ISEAS – Yusof Ishak Institute: 325–339. doi:10.2307/27908437. JSTOR 27908437.
