= Jakrapob Penkair =

Thai media personality and politician

- จักรภพ เพ็ญแข
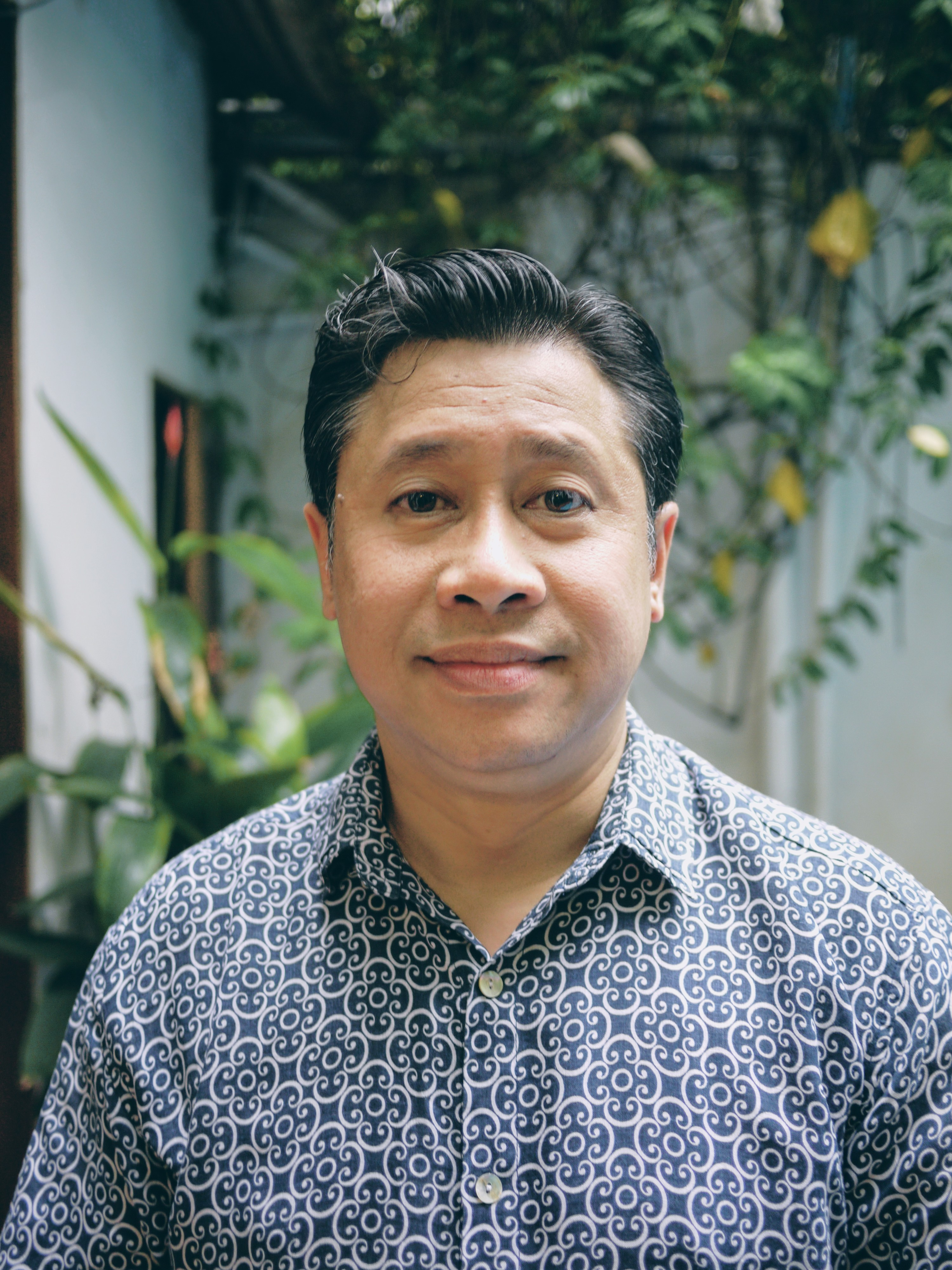

Minister to the Office of the Prime Minister
- In office 6 February 2008 – 30 May 2008
- Prime Minister: Samak Sundaravej
- Preceded by: Tippawadi Meksawan; Teerapat Serirangsan
- Succeeded by: Sukhumpong Ngonkum; Supol Fongngarm

Government spokesperson
- In office 9 December 2003 – 14 March 2005
- Prime Minister: Thaksin Shinawatra
- Preceded by: Sita Tiwaree
- Succeeded by: Chalermdej Chompunut

Personal details
- Born: 21 October 1967 (age 58) Bangkok, Thailand
- Party: Thai Rak Thai; People's Power
- Spouse: Supraipon chuaychoo (m. 2025)
- Education: Johns Hopkins SAIS (PhD); Chulalongkorn University
- Profession: Politician; MC; diplomat; journalist

Jakrapob Penkair (Thai: จักรภพ เพ็ญแข, RTGS: Chakkraphop Phenkhae; born October 21, 1967) is a Thai media personality, diplomat and politician who served as a Member of Parliament for Bangkok, the Government Spokesperson of Prime Minister Thaksin Shinawatra from 2003 to 2005, and later as a Cabinet Minister to the Office of the Prime Minister from 2007 to 2008 under the premiership of Samak Sundaravej.

Following the 2006 Thai coup d'état by the Royal Thai Army, he became a key organizer of the United Front for Democracy Against Dictatorship opposed to it. He was forced to step down after allegations of lèse majesté, a legal weapon commonly used in Thailand to silence dissent, and has been in exile since the 2009 Thai political unrest.

== Early life and education ==
Jakrapob was born in Bangkok into a middle-class family of five. He studied at the Kasetsart University Laboratory School and later at Chulalongkorn University, where he completed a bachelor’s degree in political science. He then earned a master’s degree at the Paul H. Nitze School of Advanced International Studies of Johns Hopkins University as a Fulbright scholar, and subsequently received a doctor’s degree from the same university."สัมภาษณ์พิเศษ 'จักรภพ เพ็ญแข' การต่อสู้นอกพรมแดน และชีวิตใต้ 'เพดาน' | ประชาไท Prachatai.com". prachatai.com.

== Foreign ministry and media career ==
His return from the United States in 1994 was followed by a short stint at the Charoen Pokphand Group, after which he entered the foreign ministry's information department, although he soon resigned following a dispute with his superiors. He then found employment as a news analyst at PTV.

== Political career ==
Jakrapob's rise to prominence began in 2003 when Thaksin Shinawatra appointed him government spokesperson. He became a close aide to the prime minister, and in 2005 ran as a Thai Rak Thai candidate in that year's general election. In the aftermath of the coup which ousted Thaksin, Jakrapob became a key organiser of the United Front for Democracy Against Dictatorship (UDD).

In the wake of the People's Power Party's 2007 electoral victory Jakrapob gained a place on Samak Sundaravej's cabinet. On April 1, 2008 he was appointed an executive of two state-owned television channels with a mandate to reform them.

== Allegations of lèse majesté ==
Although he was careful to keep his criticisms of King Bhumibol oblique, Jakrapob's known republicanism, however, rankled the military and its equally paranoid royalist establishment allies, and they were keen to see him removed from office.

Their chance came with the circulation of Thai translations of a speech Jakrapob gave in English at the Foreign Correspondents' Club of Thailand in August 2007. Because the speech, which was a critique of Thailand's perennial culture of patronage, directly attacked privy council president Prem Tinsulanonda, it provoked an outcry from the Democrats, who accused him of having insulted the palace. Although he held a press conference to profess his loyalty to the monarchy, Jakrapob readily admitted his opposition to the royal family to the United States embassy as well as his participation in the dissemination of anti-monarchist ideas at the grassroots level in order to prepare for an eventual alteration of Thailand's political order. Thaksin and Samak failed to support Jakrapob, however, leading him to resign on May 8, 2008.

== UDD role and exile ==
Despite the negative publicity Jakrapob remained an outspoken political activities and continued to be a tireless participant in UDD activities. He became associated with the movement's radical wing and soon formed a splinter group known as Red Siam with former communist Surachai Danwattananusorn. Because the group became much maligned for allegedly promoting violent revolution and the dismantlement of the monarchy the mainstream UDD was forced to sever ties with Jakrapob and his allies. Surachai was sentenced to 7 1/2 years in prison in 2012 for lèse majesté, but was pardoned by the king in October 2013.

Jakrapob went into hiding following the Songkran riots, vowing to carry out a more robust campaign against the government of Abhisit Vejjajiva and his establishment patrons.

Although still living in exile, he publicly resurfaced in May 2012 as a columnist for Red Power, a red shirt publication with republican leanings. Jakrapob also wrote for another similar magazine, The Voice of Taksin, under the pseudonym "Jit Pollachan". Two of his fictional stories, which were thinly veiled portrayals of the king and the royal family, were used by the Thai Constitutional Court of Thailand to convict Somyot Prueksakasemsuk of lèse majesté.

Despite his known republicanism, in an interview with Prachatai, he toned down his stance, expressing his admiration for the monarchy as a historical institution and a medium for national unity. He nevertheless restated his adamant belief that the monarchy needs to be depoliticised.
