= Prasert Sapsunthorn =

Thai politician (1913–1994)

- ประเสริฐ ทรัพย์สุนทร
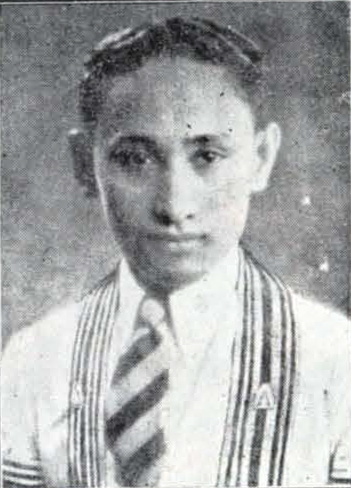

Member of the House of Representatives
- In office 1946–1947

Personal details
- Born: 8 May 1913 Kanchanadit, Surat Thani, Thailand
- Died: 25 December 1994 (aged 81) Bangkok, Thailand
- Party: Labour Party (Thailand); Communist Party of Thailand; Democrat Party (Thailand)
- Spouse: Orapin Sapsunthorn
- Education: Faculty of Arts, Chulalongkorn University
- Occupation: Politician
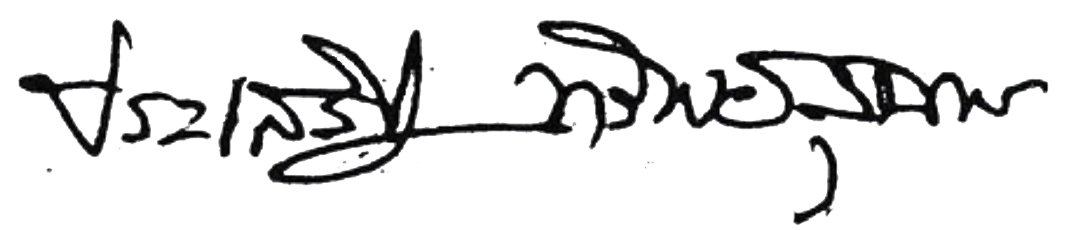
- Signature

Prasert Sapsunthorn (Thai: ประเสริฐ ทรัพย์สุนทร; 8 May 1913 – 25 December 1994) was a Thai politician who served as a member of the parliament in the House of Representatives of Thailand and a member of the Central Committee of the Communist Party of Thailand. Later, he lectured at the National Defence College of Thailand and participated in policy formulation Order 66/2523: Communism of Prem Tinsulanonda Government.

== Early life and education ==
Prasert Sapsunthorn was born on 8 May 1913 at Kanchanadit District, Surat Thani Province. Prasert graduated on Mathayom 8 at Benjamabophit School, and graduated in 1936 at the Faculty of Arts, Chulalongkorn University. He was selected as student club president of Chulalongkorn University in 1936.

== Political career ==
After graduating, Prasert worked as a government teacher in Suankularb Wittayalai School. He resigned from this position to run for election in the 1946 Siamese general election.

=== Joining the Communist Party of Thailand ===
Following the Siamese coup d'état of 1947, Prasert joined the Communist Party of Thailand and studied Marxism in China. He served on the central committee of the Communist Party of Thailand and was a part of the International Peace Conference (1951-1952).

Following his return to Thailand in 1958, he was arrested and accused of being a Communist by the Thanom Kittikachorn and Sarit Thanarat government. He was jailed for six years. Until his imprisonment, he reviewed the Peace Revolution of Thailand as well as tactics for a Communist victory.

=== Labor Party ===
Prasert supported the establishment of the Workers Center of Thailand and a new labor law in 1972. As a result, the Trade Union of Thailand received legitimacy. Prasert established the Labor Party in 1974 and changed its name to the Democracy Labor Party on 26 September 1975.

=== Order 66/2523 ===
In 1978, there was a civil war in Thailand between the Army of Thailand and the Communist Party of Thailand. Prasert wrote an article entitled "Democracy doctrine" into the Tawanmai magazine.

Prasert was the architect of the 66/23 law issued in 1980 which granted amnesty to Communist Party members who gave themselves up to the authorities.

== Death ==
Prasert died on 25 December 1994, at the age of 81.
