= Chiang Kham Airport =

Chiang Kham Airport สนามบินเชียงคำ
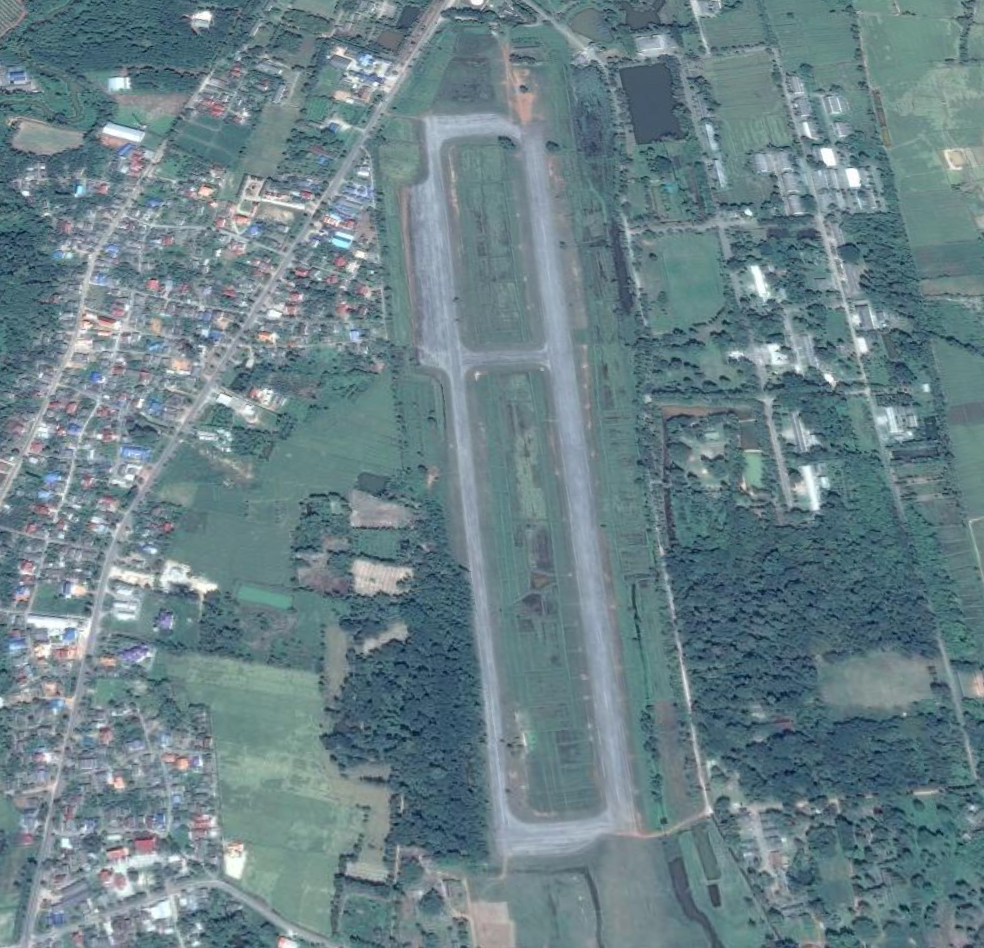
- Former Chiang Kham Airport in 2013.
- IATA: none; ICAO: VTCB

Summary
- Airport type: Defunct
- Owner: Royal Thai Air Force
- Operator: Royal Thai Army
- Location: Phayao, Thailand (56110)
- Opened: 1967
- Closed: 1990s
- Built: 1966
- Time zone: UTC+7 (+7)
- Elevation AMSL: 389 m / 1,275 ft
- Coordinates: 19°29′50″N 100°17′7.99″E
- Website: Chiang Kham Airport Info

Map
- Location in Thailand

Runways
Direction	Length		Surface
Direction	m	ft	Surface
36/18	1,271.4	4,171	Concrete

Chiang Kham Airport (ICAO: VTCB) is a disused airport located in Chiang Kham district, Phayao province, Thailand. It was built in 1966 by the United States Naval Seabees and closed in the 1990s.

== History ==
=== Construction ===
Chiang Kham Airport was built in 1966 by the United States Naval Seabees. Following Seabee Team 0909’s training at the 31s Naval Construction Regiment, they boarded a Lockheed C-130 Hercules and deployed to Thailand on 1 November 1966. Seabee Team 0909 collaborated with the Thai Border Patrol Police (BPP), utilizing heavy equipment such as bulldozers and loaders to improve road infrastructure to Chiang Kham Airport.

Seabee Team 1109, led by Lieutenant Bruce B. Geisel, arrived at Chiang Kham on April 25 1967 to relieve construction efforts previously led by Team 0909. The Seabee BPP camp was located at the airfield, and the team entailed the improvements of two miles of ox cart trails and the 40-foot Sam Ma Kee Bridge. Simultaneously, the team also upgraded the Seabee house-to-airstrip road, and cleared a 300 x 300 foot area for the installation of a helicopter landing pad. Additionally, a STOL landing ground was completed adjacent to the pad. A bridge was also built as a secondary exit from the BPP camp.

=== Operations ===
In 1969, Chiang Kham Airport was listed as a destination on the Air America Site book.

Communist conflicts

From 1970 to 1982, the airfield participated in conflicts against communist insurgents in Thailand. In the 1970s, the Royal Thai Air Force (RTAF) began counter-insurgency missions using Fairchild AU-23 Peacemaker aircraft. Subsequently, Chiang Kham Airport was upgraded in the early 1970s to include a barracks and paved roads. Paddy land near the barracks was expropriated by the military, and affected villagers were given cash compensation. During Operation Thong Pha Phum in 1974, Flying Unit 2232, Task Force 170, and Task Force 172 were based at Chiang Kham Airport.

=== Post use ===
In the 1990s, the airfield was abandoned and its ownership was transferred to the Royal Thai Army. The site is currently operated by the Khun Chom Tham Camp occupied by the 31st Ranger Regiment, Phayao.

== Present day ==
In February 2018, a proposal was made to reopen Chiang Kham Airport to boost tourism and transportation of goods in the region, however, the plan was never pursued. On February 19, Mr. Anurak Prongsuya, President of the Subdistrict Administrative Organization of Aoi Subdistrict announced the nearing completion of a border crossing between Phu Sang Subdistrict will boost tourism and transportation of goods in the region. Therefore, the former military airfield being repurposed for civilian traffic could boost the movement of people and goods.

=== Commemoration ===
A monument commemorating the 399 lives lost during the battles against the insurgents, had been built by the RTAF north of Chiang Kham Airport.

== Layout ==
The airport has a concrete 18/36 runway (1,271m), and a 355m long apron.
