= Mahachon (newspaper) =

Mahachon (Thai: มหาชน, 'The Masses') was a Thai newspaper, published as an organ of the Communist Party of Thailand. It was started in 1942 as a clandestine publication. The paper began to be published illegally in 1942, but it was legally published weekly between 25 October 1945 and 1950. After becoming legal, Mahachon had its editorial office near Sanam Luang, Bangkok.
