= Chupong Theethuan =

Thai political activist (born 1952)

- ชูพงศ์ ถี่ถ้วน
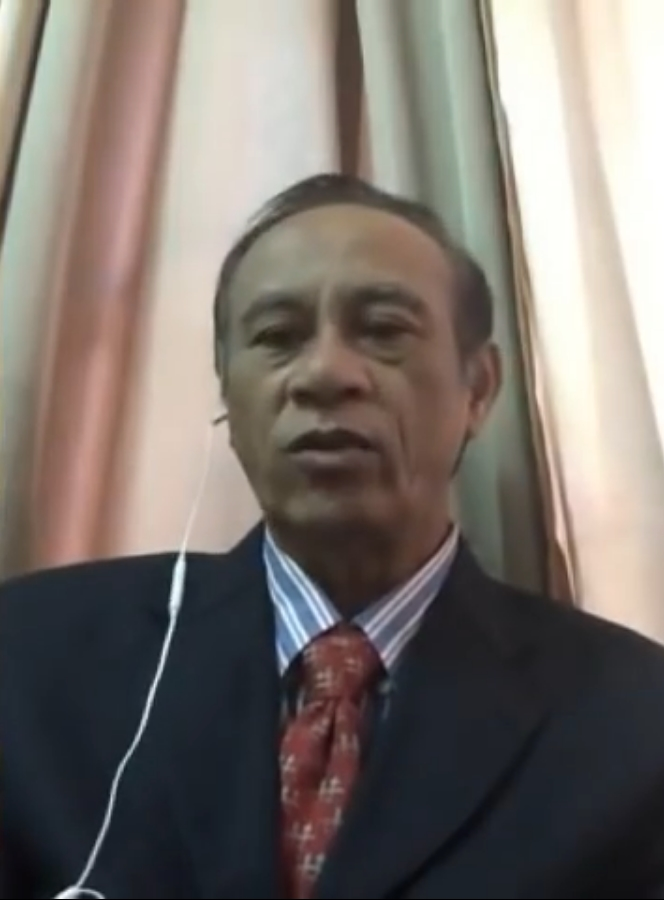
- Chupong Theethuan in 2015
- Born: February 28, 1952 (age 74); Phang Nga, Thailand
- Education: Uthenthawai Vocational School
- Height: 1.85 m (6 ft 1 in)
- Political party: New Aspiration Party

Chupong Theethuan (Thai: ชูพงศ์ ถี่ถ้วน; born 28 February 1952) is a Thai political activist. He was member of New Aspiration Party and founding the Red Siam political movement. Chupong is known for his anti-monarchist views, which have resulted in a past arrest under Thailand's lèse majesté laws. He has lived in self-imposed exile in France since 2020.

== Early life ==
Chupong Theethuan on 28 February 1952 in Phang Nga Province. Chupong graduated with at Uthenthawai Vocational School (now's Rajamangala University of Technology Tawan-ok, Uthenthawai Campus), where he majored in architecture.

== Political career ==
Chupong entered mainstream politics, first as a member of the New Aspiration Party under the leadership of Chavalit Yongchaiyudh. He also ran for the house of representative seat in 1996 of Phang Nga Province, but was never elected to any office. Later Chupong was Secretary General of the Labor Commission (2001-2005) and an advisory board to the President of the Political Development Commission (2005-2006).

== Social Movement ==
=== Labour Union ===
Chupong was movement of labour. He was Union of State Enterprises of Thailand with Thanong Pho-an and Somsak Kosaisuk and he was President of the Provincial Waterworks Authority. On 2 January 1985 Chupong appointed from minister of interior to employee committee and he resigned on 24 June 1985.

In the midyear 1986 Thanong Pho-an group and Chupong Theethuan group conflicted in interpretation of committee of the Labor Organization Council of Thailand.

=== National Revolution Parliament ===
Chupong was disciple of Prasert Sapsunthorn, owner Thai Revolution Theory. He participated in National Revolution Parliament and he arrested of Article 116 in Criminal code.

=== After 2006 Thai coup d'état ===
Chupong became well known after the 2006 Thai coup d'état, as he was a prominent member of the United Front for Democracy Against Dictatorship. In 2006, Chupong participated in protests to oust the Council for National Security junta. Afterwards, he established the Community radio 87.75 A.M. with Kaiwan Kasemsin.

After February 2010 Chupong Theethuan asylum to Cambodia, Philippines and France He criticize Government of Abhisit, Prayuth and Monarchy.

In 2019, he established Thai Progressive Party and presented the principles governing such as Sovereignty from people and people use, Full freedom, Equality by law and opportunity, Rule by law, Local election to National election.

== Awards and decorations ==
- 2002 - Companion (Fourth Class) of the Most Noble Order of the Crown of Thailand
