= Red Drum killings =

1972 mass killing in Thailand

- Location: Tambon Lam Sai, Phatthalung Province, Thailand
- Date: Late 1972
- Target: Civilians accused of supporting communists
- Deaths: 200–3,000 civilians
- Perpetrators: Communist Suppression Operations Command; Royal Thai Army; Royal Thai Police; Volunteer Defense Corps
- Motive: Anti-communism

The "Red Drum" or "Red Barrel" killings (Thai: เผาถังแดง, RTGS: Phao Thang Daeng) refers to the mass killing of more than 200 (informal accounts speak of up to 3,000) civilians who were accused of supporting communists by Thai government forces in Tambon Lam Sai, Phatthalung Province, southern Thailand, in late 1972, under the military dictatorship of Thanom Kittikachorn and Praphas Charusathien. The massacre was probably ordered by the government's Communist Suppression Operations Command (CSOC), with army, police, and volunteer defence forces being implicated in it.

It was only one example "of a pattern of widespread abuse of power by the army and enforcement agencies" during the anti-communist operations of 1971–73 that took an official death toll of 3,008 civilians throughout the country (while unofficial estimates are between 1,000 and 3,000 in Phatthalung Province alone). Those killed were accused of working with the illegal Communist Party of Thailand and supporting its insurgency.

Until that point, communist suspects arrested by soldiers were normally shot by the roadside. The "red oil drum" technique was later introduced to eliminate any possible evidence. Suspects were clubbed to a point of semi-consciousness before being dumped in gasoline-filled, used oil drums and burnt alive.

The 200-litre red drums had an iron grille divider; there was a fire below, and the victim above.

Even after the end of military rule in the wake of the October 1973 Thai popular uprising, the killings were never seriously investigated and none of the perpetrators were punished.

== See also ==
- Anti-communist mass killings
- Internal Security Operations Command
- Brazen bull
