= Puey Ungphakorn =

Thai economist (1916–1999)

Puey Ungphakorn MPCh MWM ThChW MBE
- ป๋วย อึ๊งภากรณ์
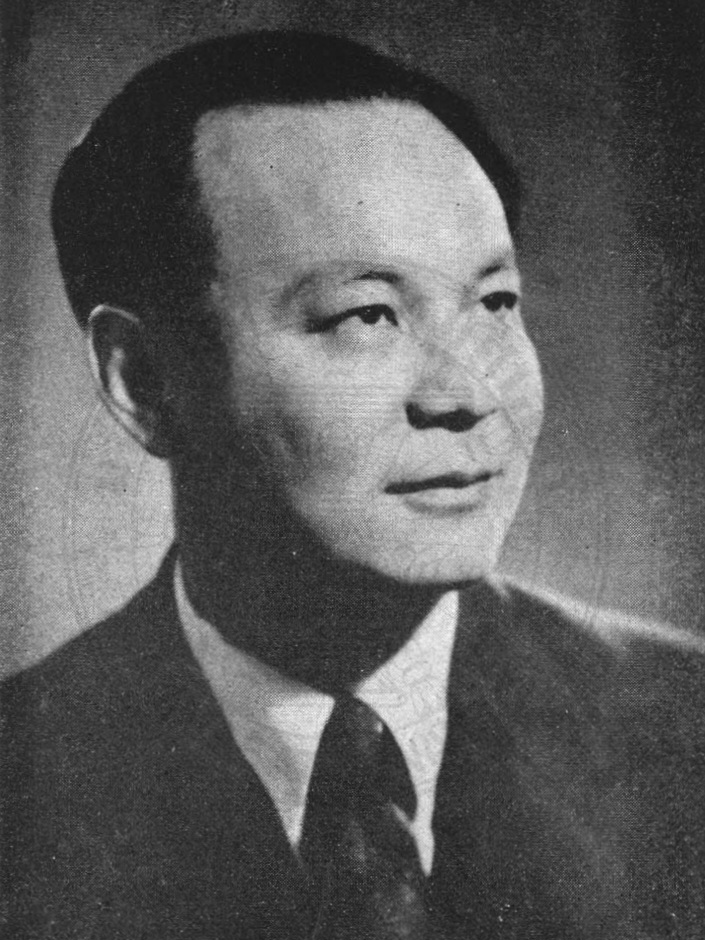

Governor of the Bank of Thailand
- In office 11 June 1959 – 15 August 1971
- Preceded by: Jote Guna-Kasem
- Succeeded by: Bisudhi Nimmanhaemin

Rector of Thammasat University
- In office 30 January 1975 – 8 October 1976
- Preceded by: Adul Wichiencharoen
- Succeeded by: Nongyao Chaiseri (acting)

Personal details
- Born: 9 March 1916 Bangkok, Siam
- Died: 28 July 1999 (aged 83) London, United Kingdom
- Spouse: Margaret Smith (m. 1946)
- Children: Jon Ungpakorn; Peter Ungpakorn; Giles Ji Ungpakorn
- Education: University of Moral and Political Sciences (LLB); London School of Economics (BSc, PhD)
- Profession: Economist
- Website: Centennial Anniversary at the Wayback Machine (archived 11 June 2017)

Military service
- Allegiance: United Kingdom; (Thailand) Free Thai Movement
- Branch/service: British Army
- Years of service: 1942–1945
- Rank: Major (temporary)
- Unit: White Elephants, Force 136
- Battles/wars: Operation Appreciation (1944)
- Awards: MBE, Military Division

Puey Ungphakorn, MBE (Thai: ป๋วย อึ๊งภากรณ์; RTGS: Puai Uengphakon; IPA:[pǔaj ʔɯ́ŋ.pʰāː.kɔ̄ːn]; Chinese: 黃培謙; pinyin: Huáng Péiqiān; 9 March 1916 – 28 July 1999), was a Thai economist who served as Governor of the Bank of Thailand and Rector of Thammasat University. He was the author of From Womb to Tomb: The Quality of Life of a South-East Asian, which to date remains one of the most influential writings about social security in Thailand.

Born to a Thai Chinese family, Puey was a graduate of the first class of Thammasat University, (Note: Known as the University of Moral and Political Sciences (Thai: มหาวิทยาลัยวิชาธรรมศาสตร์และการเมือง; RTGS: Mahawitthayalai Wicha Thammasat Lae Kanmueang) until 1952.) teaching as a lecturer of French until winning a scholarship to study economics at the London School of Economics in 1938. His studies were interrupted by the Second World War, when he joined the Free Thai resistance movement opposed to the pro-Japanese military regime of Plaek Phibunsongkhram. He was captured as a prisoner of war in 1944 after parachuting into Chai Nat Province on a reconnaissance mission.

Puey completed his studies after the war, receiving a doctorate in 1948. He joined the Ministry of Finance in 1949, serving in a progression of senior posts before becoming central bank governor in 1959. At 43, and serving for over 12 years, until 1971, Puey is to date both the youngest person appointed, and the longest serving, Governor of the Bank of Thailand. As governor, he played a central role in shaping Thailand's economic development policies during the governments of Field Marshals Sarit Thanarat and Thanom Kittikachorn. He also was a proponent of financial co-operation in Southeast Asia, leading to the establishment of regional financial and institutions such as the South East Asian Central Banks Research and Training Centre (SEACEN). He was awarded the Magsaysay Award in the field of government service in 1965.

An active academic, Puey was simultaneously Dean of the Faculty of Economics of Thammasat University from 1964 to 1972. In 1975, he was appointed Rector of Thammasat University, but resigned in protest following the massacre of student protesters on 6 October 1976. Tarred by nationalists as a leftist subversive, he was subsequently forced to flee the country for fear of his safety, residing in the United Kingdom until his death in 1999.

== Early life and education ==
Puey was born the fourth child of an immigrant Chinese fishmonger and a second generation Thai Chinese mother, with ancestry from Raoping. In 1934, he was among the first group of students to enrol at the newly opened Thammasat University, from which he graduated in 1937. After having briefly worked as a translator, Puey earned a government scholarship to study economics at the London School of Economics in 1938.

=== Free Thai movement ===
Thailand joined the Second World War on the side of the Axis in January 1942, following its invasion by Japan the previous month and the subsequent decision of Thailand's military ruler, Field Marshal Plaek Phibunsongkhram, to ally with rather than resist the Japanese invaders. Puey's studies were as a result interrupted, and he joined the Free Thai Movement resisting the pro-Japanese government, helping to organise the movement in the United Kingdom. Puey was commissioned as a Captain into the British Army and underwent vigorous training with the Special Operations Executive. In November 1944, he parachuted into Chai Nat Province in northern Thailand as part of Operation APPRECIATION, intended to establish contact with the influential and anti-Japanese politician Pridi Banomyong. He was captured almost immediately and remained technically a prisoner of war until the Japanese surrender in September 1945, though he in fact made contact with Free Thai members of the Thai police and was able to work with them from his jail cell.

After the war, Puey was promoted to the rank of Major in the British forces and was made a Member of the Order of the British Empire. He resumed his studies, having won a Leverhulme Trust scholarship, and in 1948 received a doctorate in economics from the London School of Economics, becoming one of the first Thais to do so. His thesis, dated 1949, was titled The economics of tin control.

== Government service ==
=== Ministry of Finance ===
In 1949, Puey became an economist in the Ministry of Finance. In 1953, he was appointed managing director of the National Economic Council.

=== Bank of Thailand ===
Also in 1953, Puey was appointed Deputy Governor of the Bank of Thailand. Upon becoming governor in 1959, Puey quickly attracted the attention of international agencies, foreign governments, and the international financial community for the integrity of his financial planning and management. His international stature was recognised ceremoniously in 1964 when he became the first Thai to receive the Magsaysay Award for public service. Equally important, this international recognition gave him an influence with Field Marshals Sarit Thanarat, Thanom Kittikachorn, and their cohorts which far exceeded his bureaucratic position. They sought his aid and advice as a troubleshooter for Thailand's monetary interests, particularly in matters they had botched or in which they were suspected to have their own private interests, such as remedying Sarit's mishandling of Thailand's participation on an international tin council and preventing a kickback scandal over the foreign printing of Thailand's currency.

=== Other positions ===
After stepping down as central bank governor, Puey was appointed to the un-elected National Legislative Assembly established under the interim constitution of December 1972 in the aftermath of Thanom's 1971 auto-coup. After Thanom's junta was ousted in a popular uprising in 1973, Puey was chosen by caretaker prime minister Sanya Dharmasakti, who had also served as Rector of Thammasat University, to chair the government's Economic Advisory Council. He served in both posts until Sanya's ministry was succeeded by the elected government of Seni Pramoj following elections in 1975.

== Academic career ==
In 1966, Puey became the dean of the Faculty of Economics at his alma mater, Thammasat University, where his work with the Rockefeller Foundation and with foreign scholars dramatically upgraded the training of Thailand's future technocrats. He also instituted a long-term research project on raising the productivity and economic level of Thai villagers. It was during this period that he was invited to serve as a visiting professor at both Cambridge and Princeton universities and was appointed to the governing boards of such organisations as the International Council for Educational Development, the East-West Center (EWC), the Asian Institute of Management, and the International Food Policy Research Institute.

Puey played an instrumental role in the establishment of the Bangkok-based Asian Institute of Technology (AIT), previously the Graduate School of Engineering of the Southeast Asia Treaty Organization (SEATO) in 1967. Dr Puey became the first chairperson of the AIT Board of Trustees from 1968 to 1973.

After the ousting of Thanom's regime in October 1973, Puey was catapulted into political prominence and, along with M.R. Kukrit Pramoj, was broadly promoted as one of the two major candidates for the post of prime minister in the elected government that would follow the palace-picked interim administration of Sanya Thammasak. However, after a great deal of self-examination, Puey disavowed all interest in such a candidacy and returned to Thammasat, where he was appointed rector. Puey's explanation was that when he had joined the Free Thai Movement he had taken an oath never to seek or accept political appointment until after reaching the age of retirement. Some have argued, however, that Puey's withdrawal was based upon his mature understanding of the nature of society and that he had accurately foreseen that the upcoming democratic period would be inherently unstable, dangerous, and short-lived.

== Exile ==
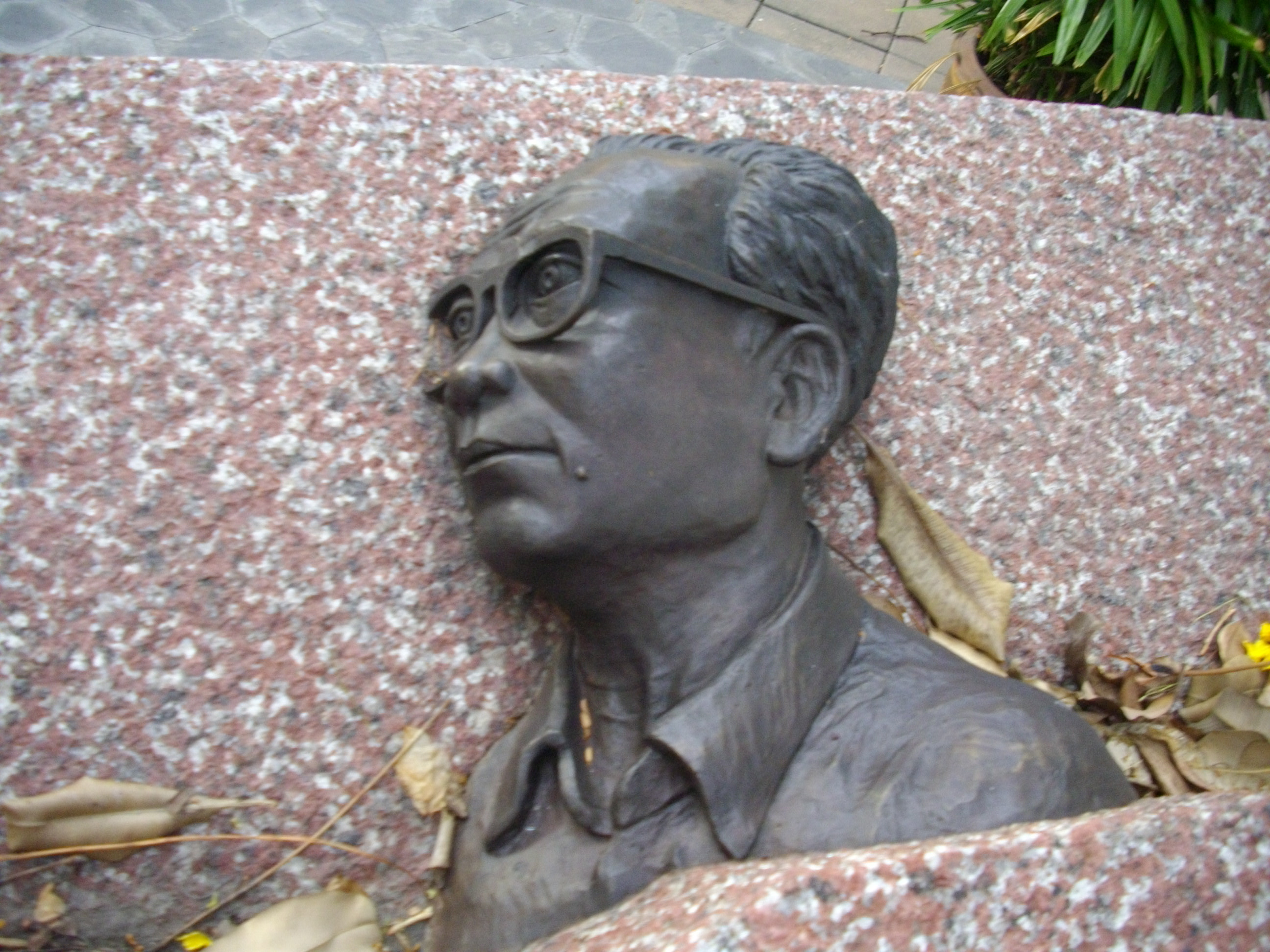
Puey Ungphakorn's relief in the 6 October 1976 Massacre Memorial, Thammasat University, Bangkok

Despite his service, honesty and international reputation, Puey was branded a communist and "destroyer of unity" by the political right of Thailand. Although he spoke out against the unending student demonstrations of 1975–76 as being both ineffective and self-destructive, and even denied his students any use of the Thammasat campus as a base for mounting public demonstrations, he was nevertheless assigned blame for their occurrence.

On the evening of the bloody 6 October 1976 Massacre, Puey resigned from his position as rector of Thammasat in protest against the bloodbath that had occurred that day on the university campus. Realising he was a marked man, Puey went to Don Mueang airport where he was met by a lynch mob. Only with the help of the Royal Thai Air Force Air Police, who had been instructed by King Bhumibol's privy council office to help him leave, did he evade death and get on a plane bound for London.

While living abroad, Puey met with Thais and influential figures in several countries, including those in the United Kingdom, the United States, France, Germany, Sweden, Denmark, Japan, and Australia to speak about the incident and to call for a peaceful transition to democracy in Thailand. In 1977, Puey gave testimonials before the House Committee on Foreign Affairs investigating human rights in Thailand following the incident of 6 October 1976 Massacre.

In September 1977, Puey suffered a haemorrhagic stroke and was confined to a hospital for three months. The illness left Puey with a speech impediment resulting in mumbling speech. He could walk by himself, but was unable to control his right hand. Puey died in London on 28 July 1999.

== Legacy ==
In 2015, he was recognised by UNESCO for his high ethical standards.

== Honours ==
=== Military rank ===
- Major of the British Army

=== Academic rank ===
- Professor of Thammasat University

== See also ==
- Jon Ungpakorn, Peter Ungpakorn, Giles Ji Ungpakorn, his sons with his English wife, Margaret Smith
- Prachuap Ungpakorn, nephew
