= Surachai Danwattananusorn =

Thai political activist, disappeared in 2018

- สุรชัย ด่านวัฒนานุสรณ์
- Surachai Danwattananusorn in 2010
- Born: 24 December 1942; Pak Phanang, Nakhon Si Thammarat, Thailand
- Disappeared: 10 December 2018 (aged 75); Vientiane, Laos
- Status: Missing for 7 years, 9 months and 5 days
- Education: Sukhothai Thammathirat Open University (B.A.)
- Political party: New Aspiration Party; Thai Rak Thai Party
- Spouse: Pranee Danwattananusorn

Surachai Danwattananusorn (Thai: สุรชัย ด่านวัฒนานุสรณ์; born 24 December 1942, disappeared 10 December 2018), born Surachai Saedan (Thai: สุรชัย แซ่ด่าน), was a Thai political activist and former political prisoner. He disappeared in 2018 along with two of his aides who were later found to have been murdered. He is believed to have been killed as well.

Surachai was the last member of the Communist Party of Thailand to be pardoned. After his release he entered mainstream politics, becoming a committee member of the Thai Rak Thai Party and founding the Red Siam political movement.

He was known for his anti-monarchist views, which resulted in a past arrest under Thailand's lèse majesté laws.

Surachai had been in exile in neighbouring Laos since the Thai military coup of 2014. He disappeared in December 2018.

== Political career ==
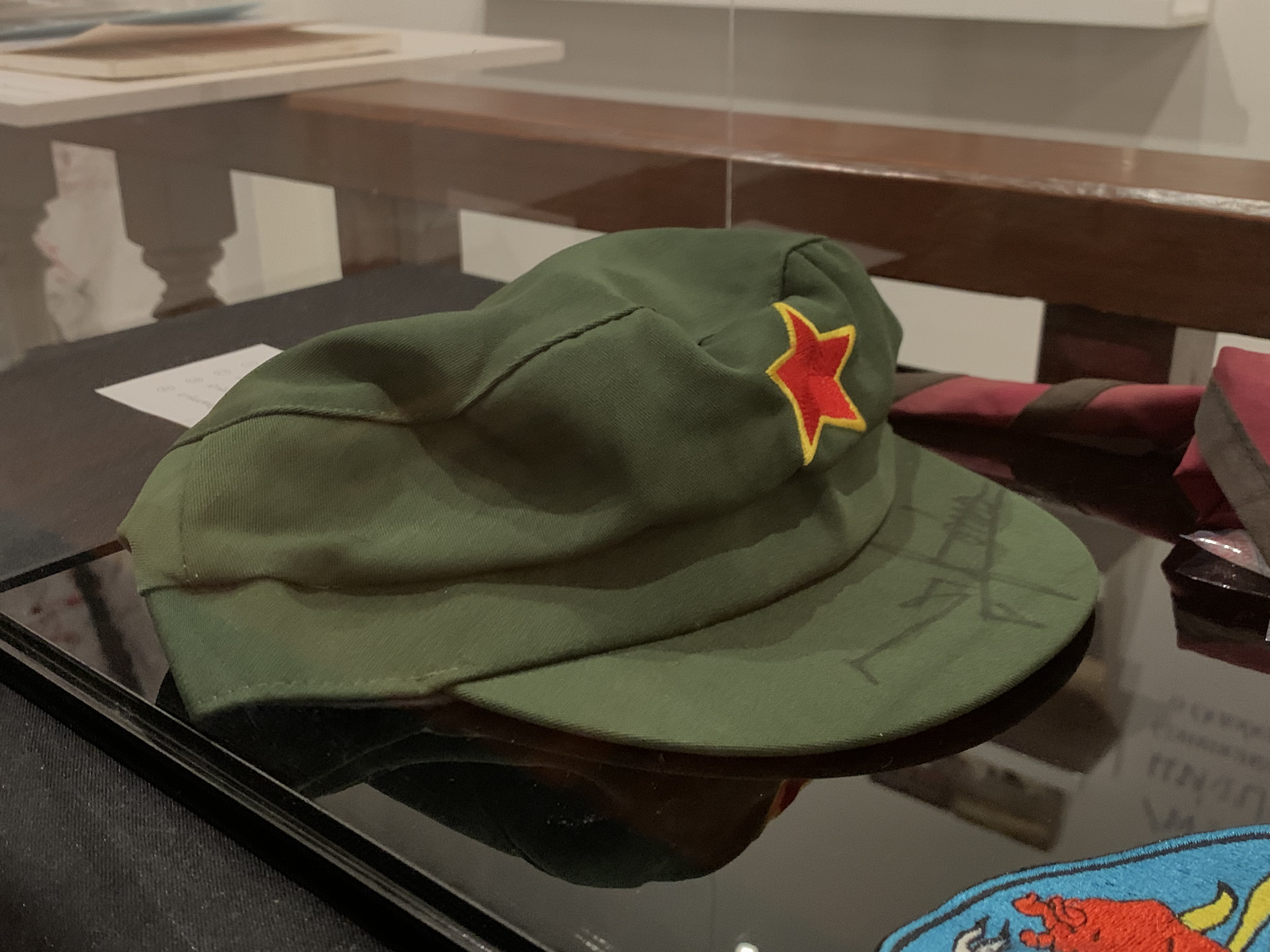
A former communist red star hat with Surachai's signature

Surachai became well known after the Thammasat University massacre, as he was a prominent member of the Communist Party of Thailand. He was sentenced to death for murder and his participation in a train robbery but received a royal pardon in 1988.

After his release, Surachai entered mainstream politics, first as a member of the New Aspiration Party under the leadership of Chavalit Yongchaiyudh, and later as a Thai Rak Thai Party candidate for the House of Representatives. He also ran for the senate seat of Nakhon Si Thammarat, but was never elected to any office.

In 2006, Surachai participated in protests to oust the Council for National Security junta. Afterwards, he established the Red Siam political movement with Jakrapob Penkair.

On 6 August 2007, while on stage at a United Front for Democracy Against Dictatorship rally, Surachai allegedly insulted then-Prime Minister Chuan Leekpai. He was found guilty by a criminal court and was fined 50,000 baht, but the fine was later reduced by half after Surachai confessed to the crime.

Surachai was arrested again on 22 February 2011, this time according to the arrest warrant of the Criminal Court 27/2554, for committing lèse majesté at a speech near Sanam Luang. On 28 February 2012, The Criminal Court sentenced him to 7 years and 6 months in prison. However, Surachai received a royal pardon on 3 October 2013. He condemned Thaksin Shinawatra for support Thai government to exchange Royal pardonand work with Move Forward Party instead. Red shirt is nothing but hypocrisy against Thai protest movement.

== Personal life ==
Surachai Danwattananusorn was born Surachai Saedan (Thai: สุรชัย แซ่ด่าน; Chinese: 陳嘉前) on 24 December 1942 in Thaphaya Tumbol, Pak Phanang District, Nakhon Si Thammarat Province. He was the son of Yokyuan and Somchao Saedan. Surachai graduated with a Bachelor of Arts in political science from Sukhothai Thammathirat Open University. He has married three times, and has three sons and a daughter.

== Disappearance ==
Surachai disappeared from Vientiane, Laos, in December 2018. His spouse last heard from him on 10 December. Thai Prime Minister Gen. Prayut Chan-ocha visited Vientiane on 13 December. Two of his aides, Chatcharn "Puchana" Buppawan and Kraidej "Kasalong" Luelert, also in exile in Vientiane, were last seen in Laos on 11 December before they too disappeared.

On 26 and 27 December 2018, the bodies of the two aides were discovered floating in the Mekong River near Nakhon Phanom. Reports of a third body being found have been denied by Thai authorities. As of January 2019 Surachai remains missing.

Some in the Thai media see the forced disappearances and murders as a warning to anti-monarchists.

Human Rights Watch has documented the disappearance of two other Thai activists in Laos, one in 2016 and another in 2017. The number of "disappeared" Thai activists exiled in Laos may be as high as five since 2015.

In February 2024, a Nakhon Si Thammarat court declared Surachai missing following a 23 December 2023 petition by his wife.

== See also ==
- List of people who disappeared mysteriously: post-1970
- Human rights in Thailand § Forced disappearances
