= Samak Jalikula =

Thai politician (1938–2026)

- สมัคร ชาลีกุล
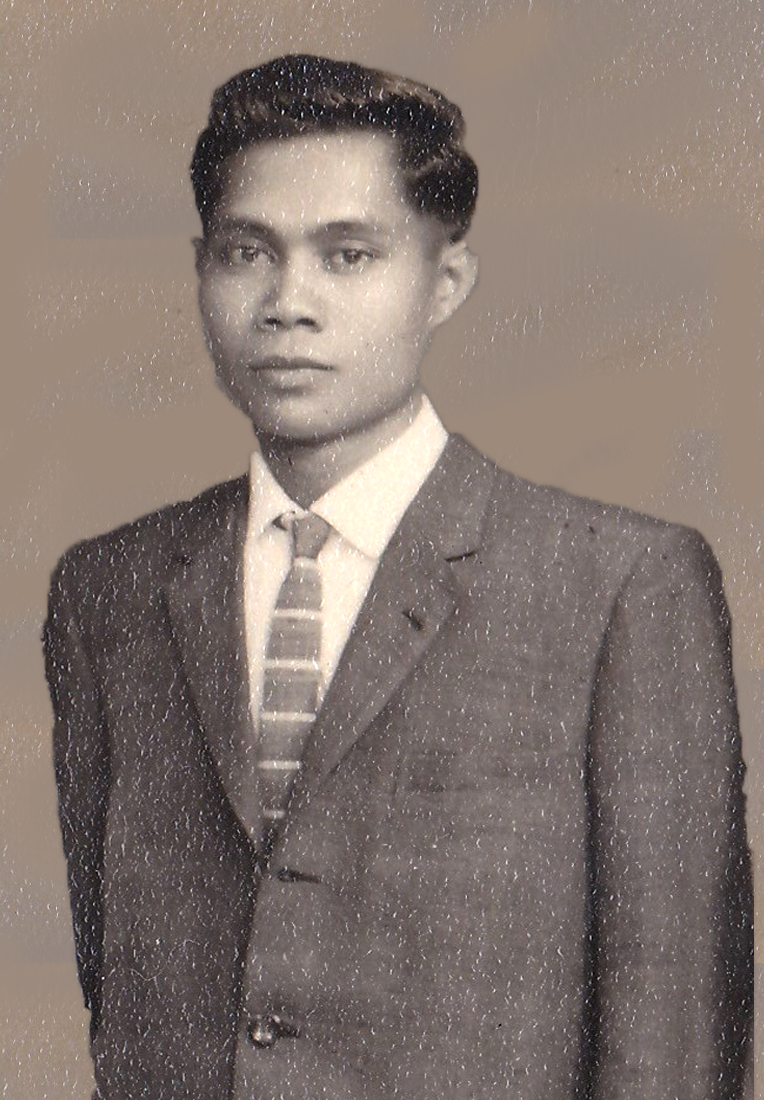
- Jalikula in 1958

Member of Thai House of Representatives
- In office 26 January 1975 – 12 January 1976

Personal details
- Born: 5 May 1938 Chaiyaphum, Siam
- Died: 11 January 2026 (aged 87) Chaiyaphum Hospital, Chaiyaphum, Thailand
- Party: Socialist Front (Thailand)
- Height: 1.74 m (5 ft 9 in)
- Children: Jennifer Dahm Petersen, born Jennifer Chalikul, 1969
- Occupation: Politician, teacher, farmer

Samak Jalikula (Thai: สมัคร ชาลีกุล RTGS: Samak Chalikul; 5 May 1938 – 11 January 2026) was a Thai politician who was a member of House of Representatives from Chaiyaphum Province. He was one of the politicians who fled to the forest after the massacre of protesters at Thammasat University on 6 October 1976.

Jalikula died on 11 January 2026, at the age of 86.
