= Order 66/2523 =

The Order of the Office of the Prime Minister No. 66/2523, often known simply as Order 66/2523 or Order 66/23, was a directive of the Thai government outlining key policies in the fight against the communist insurgency towards the end of the Cold War. It was issued on 23 April 1980 (BE 2523) and signed by then-Prime Minister General Prem Tinsulanonda. The order formalized a shift in policy from the hard-line military stance practised by the rightist government of Thanin Kraivixien (in power from 1976 to 1977) towards a more moderate approach which prioritized political measures over military action. It called for addressing social injustices and the promotion of political participation and democratic processes. Amnesty laws issued in accordance with the order allowed defectors to leave the insurgent movement, which, combined with a deterioration of international support, led to the fall of the Communist Party of Thailand.
