= The King Never Smiles =

2006 unauthorized biography by Paul M. Handley

- The King Never Smiles book cover
- Author: Paul M. Handley
- Language: English
- Subject: Unauthorized biography
- Publisher: Yale University Press
- Publication date: 2006

The King Never Smiles is an unauthorized biography of Thailand's King Bhumibol Adulyadej (Rama IX) by Paul M. Handley, a freelance journalist who lived and worked as a foreign correspondent in Thailand. It was published in 2006 by Yale University Press. The book was banned in Thailand before publication, and the Thai authorities have blocked local access to websites advertising the book.

== Book summary ==
The publicity materials at the Yale University Press website originally described the book as telling "the unexpected story of [King Bhumibol Adulyadej's] life and 60-year rule — how a Western-raised boy came to be seen by his people as a living Buddha, and how a king widely seen as beneficent and apolitical could in fact be so deeply political, autocratic, and even brutal. Blasting apart the widely accepted image of the king as egalitarian and virtuous, Handley convincingly portrays an anti-democratic monarch who, together with allies in big business and the murderous, corrupt Thai military, has protected a centuries-old, barely modified feudal dynasty."

The New York Times noted the book "presents a direct counterpoint to years of methodical royal image-making that projects a king beyond politics, a man of peace, good works and Buddhist humility." and, "The book describes [the King's only son], Vajiralongkorn, as a willful man prone to violence, fast cars and dubious business deals."

== Censorship in Thailand ==
Well before its release, in January 2006, the Thai Information and Communications Ministry banned access to the book and blocked access from Thailand to the book's page on the Yale University Press website and at Amazon.com. In a statement dated 19 January 2006, Thai National Police Chief General Kowit Wattana said the book has "contents which could affect national security and the good morality of the people."

On 19 July 2006, ThaiDay, an English-language Thai paper, reported that the Thai government made great efforts to suppress the book, even contacting former American president George H. W. Bush and the president of Yale University, Richard C. Levin, to enlist their help.

In February 2007, the Chula Book Centre, the main bookshop of state-run Chulalongkorn University, removed Chulalongkorn University professor Giles Ungphakorn's 2007 book A Coup for the Rich from its shelves after a manager of the book shop found that it listed The King Never Smiles as a reference. State-run Thammasat University's bookshop quickly followed suit, refusing to sell the book on 6 March. However, the university's rector later reversed this decision and ordered the bookshop to sell it. A Coup for the Rich was ultimately banned by the Metropolitan Police Bureau in 2008.

In October 2011, Thai-born American Joe Gordon was sentenced to two and a half years in prison by a Bangkok judge for defaming the royal family by translating sections of the book into Thai and posting them online. The judgement caused international concern as Gordon had published the extracts several years previously while living in the US and was detained only after returning to Thailand in May 2011 to seek medical treatment. Speaking after the verdict, Gordon said: "I am an American citizen and what happened was in America." Later, he added in Thai, "In Thailand they put people in prison even if they don't have proof." In July 2012, Gordon was pardoned by the king in advance of the Thai prime minister Yingluck Shinawatra's meeting with US secretary of state Hillary Clinton.

== Dueling biographers ==
The Handley book was published six years after the first biography of King Bhumibol, The Revolutionary King by William Stevenson. Stevenson was chosen by Bhumibol himself after reading his previous book A Man Called Intrepid, a highly controversial and hagiographic biography of the Canadian Spymaster William Stephenson which had been widely criticized and discredited by veterans and historians of the CIA, MI6, and Canadian Intelligence. Despite this, Bhumibol allegedly became obsessed with the book and personally translated it from English to Thai and had the Army and the Postal Service distribute thousands of copies. Handley commented on Stevenson's book, pages 437-439 of The King Never Smiles:

"Ten years earlier, Bhumibol had invited William Stevenson, the author of the original Intrepid, to write the book. Stevenson lodged in the princess mother's Srapathum Palace and was provided research support and unprecedented interviews with court staff and the king himself ... The result was a book that presents Bhumibol as truly inviolate, magical, and godly ... the book is chock-full of the standard Ninth Reign mythology, matching the view of the palace and royal family projected in Thai publications ... When it came out, the book proved a misadventure. Stevenson was liberal with style and careless with facts to the point of embarrassing the palace. His errors were legion. The book opened with a map that showed Thailand in possession of significant portions of Laos and Burma, and put the king's Hua Hin palace 300 kilometers and a sea away from where it should be. It ended with a genealogical chart naming Rama VII as the son of his brother Rama VI ... (But) Thousands of copies circulated in Thailand, and the general reaction was to castigate the author's failings while not questioning the essence of his story, the magical and sacral monarchy of Bhumibol Adulyadej."

— Paul M. Handley

Stevenson reviewed the Handley book in the Asian Wall Street Journal and the Wall Street Journal Online (16 June 2006)

"Thais dislike seeing in print careless references to their king, Bhumibol Adulyadej, the reigning Ninth Rama of the Chakri dynasty. The king is venerated as a guardian of ancient traditions that are believed to have saved the Thai people from imperialists, communists and neocolonialists. They will disapprove of Paul Handley's gossipy, unfair account of this apotheosized man, the world's longest-reigning monarch. Mr. Handley casts the king as an enemy of democracy who, to solidify his once-shaky authority, allied himself with scheming generals and crooked politicians. None of this can be supported by the facts ... Mr. Handley focuses more upon the king's allegedly Machiavellian virtues than his spiritual ones. He writes, 'Bhumibol's restoration of the power and prestige of the throne was ... the fruit of a plodding, determined, and sometimes ruthless effort by diehard princes to reclaim their birthright, [and] Bhumibol's unquestioning commitment to the restoration under their tutelage.' ... Mr. Handley has largely turned King Bhumibol's story into a political screed to suit the prejudices of those with a stake in sidelining the monarch."

— William Stevenson

== Critical reception ==
=== International reception ===
The book has had a generally positive reception among international critics and scholars. The New York Review of Books called it, "one of the most important books on Thailand to appear in English." It further noted that, "The originality of Handley's book lies in his tough but I think fair-minded analysis of the revival of royal authority under King Bhumibol."

In a review in the New Left Review, Duncan McCargo, a lecturer from the University of Leeds who wrote several articles on the "network monarchy" of Bhumibol and his proxies, called The King Never Smiles an "important book," that was, "fluently written and grounded in very considerable research." McCargo said that while Handley's account, "draws on insights into the Thai monarchy from a range of scholars and writers, including Christine Gray, Kobkua Suwannathat-Pian, and Sukhumbhand Paribatra," his narrative, "moves far beyond the parameters of these precursors. It has a salience and an urgency well beyond that of any ordinary biography..." McCargo praised Handley's "understanding of Bhumibol as a political actor, as the primary architect of a lifelong project to transform an unpopular and marginalized monarchical institution—on the verge of abolition more than once—into the single most powerful component of the modern Thai state." McCargo also praised Handley's "brilliantly intuitive grasp of the seedy interplay between money and power," regarding the workings of the Crown Property Bureau. In addition, McCargo noted Handley's "evident empathy with his subject."

=== Thai reception ===
Critical reception in Thailand varied. Royalist Thai media tycoon and talk-show host Sondhi Limthongkul informally criticized the book as "full of gossip" and called Paul Handley "aggressive", "highhanded", "sassy", "derogatory to Asians", and "insolent even to his own parents".

Chris Baker, an independent academic residing in Thailand who wrote a report praising Bhumibol's self-sufficient economy theories for the United Nations, reviewed the book in the Asia Sentinel. Baker praised the book, but said that in its later chapters, it ignored the role of the Thai elite and middle class in reimagining Bhumibol as a symbol of democracy. Baker said that the middle class was key in "rewriting history to cast the king as a peace-maker in 1973 and 1992, glossing over 1976 altogether, and ignoring the 1932 revolution to make democracy seem to be a gift from the throne." Baker also said that the section of the book covering the 2005-2006 political crisis (which was still occurring at the time of the book's publication) included unspecified errors and failed to explain why various groups seized on the monarchy as the focus of opposition to the government of Thaksin Shinawatra. Baker said that although the book introduced little that was new for experts, it did bring everything together, including many obscure sources, in a way that "connects the dots of a complex and important story with great narrative skill and very elegant prose." Furthermore, he said that the book did not "stray off to imagine what is going on in the king's mind." He noted that the book was "far from perfect," but was still "streets ahead of the competition, especially the hilariously error-prone effort of William Stevenson seven years ago."

Socialist activist, anti-monarchist and political scientist Giles Ungphakorn reviewed the book for Prachatai online newspaper (his brother, Jon Ungpakorn was the Secretary General of the foundation that ran the online newspaper). In his review, he praised the book for its evidence-backed analysis while disagreeing with some major points in the book. He stated that Handley underestimated the historical importance of the popular movement in Thailand, for instance by writing that the 1932 revolution was led by a foreign educated elite that was not accompanied by a popular uprising among the rural population. Giles noted that this view was different from that of political scientist Nakharin Mekhtrairat, who claimed there was strong pressure within the mainstream Thai society of the time to overthrow the absolute monarchy. Giles also said that the book's analysis of the weakening of the Thai military dictatorship during the late 1970s overemphasized the importance of Bhumibol, Army Commander Krit Srivara, and Richard Nixon's diplomacy with Communist China, while not placing enough importance on the role of students and workers. Giles stated that Handley's view that dictator Sarit Thanarat was a tool for King Bhumibol was not that of political scientist Thak Chaloemtiarana, who felt the opposite was true: Sarit used King Bhumibol as a tool to increase his own credibility.

== Publication history ==
The book was commercially successful. By October 2006, the book went through three printings. Although the book was banned in Thailand, samizdat photocopies of the book were available for sale in the Tha Phrachan area of Bangkok. Unauthorized translations of sections of the book appeared on several websites, although some sites were blocked by censors.

== See also ==
- Censorship in Thailand
- Bhumibol Adulyadej
- William Stevenson
- Monarchy of Thailand
- Lese majeste
