= Jon Ungphakorn =

Thai politician (1947–2025)

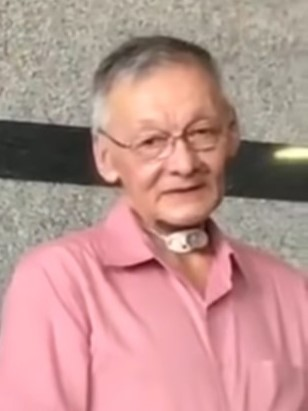
- Jon in 2019

Senator of Thailand
- In office 22 March 2000 – 21 March 2006

Personal details
- Born: 19 September 1947 London, England
- Died: 13 May 2025 (aged 77)
- Parent: Puey Ungphakorn (father)
- Education: University of Sussex

Jon Ungphakorn (Thai: จอน อึ๊งภากรณ์, RTGS: Chon Uengphakon; 19 September 1947 – 13 May 2025) was a Thai non-governmental organization (NGO) executive who served as a member of the Senate of Thailand from 2000 to 2006.

== Life and career ==
Ungphakorn was the eldest of three sons of the economist Puey Ungphakorn, who was a governor of the Bank of Thailand and rector of Thammasat University, and Margaret née Smith of London. His brothers are the journalist Peter Mytri Ungphakorn and the political scientist and Marxist activist Giles Ji Ungpakorn.

He completed a bachelor's degree in electrical engineering at the University of Sussex and taught as a lecturer at Mahidol University in Bangkok for five years. He started his social activism during the 1970s. He initiated the Thai Volunteer Service in 1980, that facilitates development projects across Thailand. The network provides help to smaller, local NGOs to manage and fund their own projects. In 1991, Ungphakorn founded the non-governmental organisation AIDS Access, raising awareness for HIV/AIDS in the country, supplying help and training to patients through a network of some 500 local offices.

In 2000 Ungphakorn was elected to the Thai Senate with the support of the NGO and HIV/AIDS communities. He was one of 18 senators representing the capital Bangkok for a six-year term. He served in the Senate's health committee and the committee on social development and human security. He worked to include HIV/AIDS patients in the "30-baht-per-visit" national healthcare scheme of the Thaksin Shinawatra government. He also supported a lawsuit against Bristol-Myers Squibb to allow for a critical anti-HIV drug being produced in Thailand at half the cost. In 2004, he co-founded the Prachatai online newspaper and once served on its board. In 2005 he was awarded the Magsaysay Award for Governmental Services, exactly 40 years after his father won the award.

Ungphakorn opposed the 2006 military coup. On 12 December 2007, he participated in a sit-in at the house of parliament, protesting against the junta-appointed National Legislative Assembly's rapid passing of laws on internal security and university privatisation without public participation. He was charged with trespassing, incitement to break the law, and leading an illegal gathering. After all stages of appeal, the Supreme Court condemned him to a two-year suspended sentence. In 2009, he initiated the Internet for People's Laws Project (iLaw) to enable people to propose and amend laws through the process of collecting 10,000 signatures to the parliament under provisions of the 2007 constitution.

Ungphakorn was married and had three children. He died on 13 May 2025, at the age of 77.
