= Giles Ji Ungpakorn =

Thai academic and political activist

Giles Ji Ungpakorm
- ใจ อึ๊งภากรณ์

Personal details
- Born: 25 October 1953 (age 72) Thailand
- Parent: Puey Ungphakorn (father)
- Relatives: Jon Ungpakorn (brother)
- Education: University of Sussex, Durham University, SOAS University of London
- Occupation: Politician, Scholar, Political activist, Marxist, Lecturer, Professor
- Nickname: ใจ (Ji)

Giles Ji Ungpakorn (Thai: ใจ อึ๊งภากรณ์; RTGS: Chai Uengphakon, pronounced [tɕāj ʔɯ́ŋ.pʰāː.kɔ̄ːn]; born 25 October 1953) is a Thai-British academic, and Marxist political activist, who formerly worked as a teacher at Chulalongkorn University. He worked as an associate professor in the Faculty of Political Science, Chulalongkorn University, before he fled to the United Kingdom in 2009 after facing a lèse majesté charge in Thailand.

== Early life and education ==
Giles Ji Ungpakorn is the youngest son of Puey Ungpakorn, former Bank of Thailand governor and Thammasat University rector, and his wife Margaret Smith of London. He holds both Thai and British citizenship. He has two older brothers, former senator Jon Ungphakorn and Peter Mytri Ungphakorn.

Giles Ungpakorn studied biochemistry at the University of Sussex and ecology at Durham University, and worked for 12 years as a lab technician at Oxford University. He later completed a Master's degree in Southeast Asian politics and economics at the School of Oriental and African Studies, University of London. He returned to Thailand in 1997 and became a lecturer at the Faculty of Political Science, Chulalongkorn University.

== Political role ==
In 2006, after the military staged a coup and revoked the constitution, Ungpakorn jointly led a demonstration by university students in downtown Bangkok.

In February 2007, his English-language academic work, A Coup for the Rich was refused distribution by the Chulalongkorn University bookstore. His use of the controversial The King Never Smiles, which he has reviewed and criticised, as a reference was the explanation given by the store manager.

Ji was formally charged with lese majeste in Bangkok on 20 January 2009. He had 20 days to respond to the charges, after which the Thai authorities would decide whether his case would be given to the Thai courts for prosecution. Ji said he was being charged because of the contents of his book A Coup for the Rich, which points out the reasons the coup in Thailand two years prior took place. He fled Thailand in February 2009, returning to the United Kingdom. He stated, "I did not believe I would receive a fair trial."

Ji is a self-declared republican and a vocal opponent of the Thai monarchy and the military. While fleeing Thailand, he wrote Red Siam Manifesto, which explicitly criticised King Bhumibol Adulyadej. He has criticised King Bhumibol for being a "weak, unprincipled" monarch who has never supported democracy, and holds the army, the elites, and the king responsible for supporting the Thammasat University Massacre of 1976. He has denounced the king's much-touted sufficiency economy, branding it an arrogant commandment for the poor to know their place, while the king is the richest monarch in the world. Ji also declares himself a Marxist. He is a member of the Thai socialist group Turn Left Thailand, which is part of the Trotskyist International Socialist Tendency. Ji is also a Red Shirt and member of Kon Thai UK, a Red Shirt organization in the UK.

In an opinion piece written for the Asia Sentinel website he discounted the prospects of a successful social and political reform, and has aligned himself with those who are calling for a social revolution to occur in Thailand. Giles has also criticised those who advocate armed struggle.

His latest English language book, Thailand's Crisis and the Fight for Democracy, published in early 2010, is Ji's attempt to explain the present situation in Thailand before the Red Shirt demonstrations and clashes with the military in April and May 2010. A blog with the name "Ugly Truth Thailand" is run under Ji's name. It talks about many controversial topics of Thailand's politics.

== Honours ==
=== Academic rank ===
- Associate Professor of Chulalongkorn University (resigned)
