= Social Sanction (Thailand) =

Social Sanction (SS) was Thailand's first organized online ultra-royalist vigilante group; it has been characterized as fascist. It operated between 2010 and 2013 and targeted people with public exposure and accusations of lèse-majesté.

== History ==
By 2009, incidents of "cyber witch hunts" were occurring in Thailand. The first Facebook group to publicly accuse people of lèse-majesté was "Rally Bangkokians to Oppose Evil Red Shirts." Subsequently, SS was founded anonymously in March 2010. It was the first such group to be organized and systematic in its operations, with its stated aim being to "unite Thais to expose crooks and defend the monarch by social sanction." In July 2012, SS launched a campaign against a Lt. Col. Sopa, using a photograph found on the Internet. When it became clear that SS had used a photograph of the wrong person, there was an outcry, which led to SS shutting down.

== Tactics ==
SS targeted people by sharing people's personal profiles, sought to expose their addresses and phone numbers, and via postings accused them of being disloyal to the monarchy and of lèse-majesté. If the accused responded to these postings, the campaign re-posted screenshots of the reactions with additional defamatory comments. The main strategy was not to provide evidence of lèse-majesté, but simply to attack individuals with the general accusation of being "un-Thai." The group therefore used "Thai-ness under absolute monarchy" as its principal ideological point of reference, as illustrated in postings such as: "[W]hoever questions, criticizes or does not express love toward the monarch is considered alien, ungrateful, and evil." In addition to allegations of lèse-majesté, group members insulted supporters of the exiled Prime Minister Thaksin Shinawatra using dehumanizing with terms like "red buffalo." Group members also accused them of being ungrateful, traitors, and "dead wood." Group members stated that they had no faith in the police or any institution other than the monarchy^{:29} and publicly advocated lynching.^{:224} This was deliberately framed as being political activism and as a "social sanction." The group's tactics and discourse has led to it being characterized as fascist.

== Impact ==
The cyber-mobbing that groups like SS initiated, which threatened political opponents with lèse-majesté allegations, and which saw the manipulation of fake online profiles, initiated a "cyber guerilla war,"^{:224} including the emergence of the Anti-Social Sanction group, which likewise exposed group members' personal data. The war only lessened with the election of Yingluck Shinawatra and a temporary stabilization of Thai politics.^{:224} During the three years that the group operated, until July 2013, approximately 40-50 people were "exposed." At its peak, its Facebook page had over 30,000 "likes."

== See also ==
- Cyber Scouts (Thailand)
- Lèse majesté in Thailand
- Red Gaurs
- Nawaphon
- Rubbish Collection Organization
- Thai Rangers
- Village Scouts
