= Border Patrol Police =

Thai paramilitary police

Border Patrol Police ตำรวจตระเวนชายแดน
- Patch of Border Patrol Police

- Emblem of the Border Patrol Police
- Common name: Tor. Chor. Dor. (ต.ช.ด.)

Agency overview
- Formed: 1951

Jurisdictional structure
- Operations jurisdiction: Thailand
- General nature: Civilian police
- Specialist jurisdictions: National border patrol, security, integrity; Paramilitary law enforcement, counter insurgency, riot control

Operational structure
- Parent agency: Royal Thai Police

Notables
- Significant Conflicts: Cold War; Laotian Civil War; Battle of Lima Site 85; Communist insurgency in Thailand; Communist insurgency in Malaysia; Vietnamese border raids in Thailand; Thai–Laotian Border War; Black May; War on drugs; Internal conflict in Myanmar; Battle of Bangkloi; Myanmar border clashes; South Thailand insurgency; Cambodian–Thai border dispute; 2025 Cambodia–Thailand clashes

Website
- www.bpp.go.th

The Border Patrol Police (BPP; Thai: ตำรวจตระเวนชายแดน) is a paramilitary police law enforcement agency under the jurisdiction of the Royal Thai Police (RTP), legally mandated with comprehensive responsibilities encompassing border security across the frontiers of the Kingdom of Thailand—specifically through territorial preservation and the interdiction of illicit activities within its border jurisdiction. This includes maintaining security along strategic border corridors where diplomatic and international legal constraints preclude the direct deployment of regular military forces.

Concurrently, the BPP executes civilian-centric disaster relief to assist populations affected by natural calamities, population-centric counterinsurgency and hearts-and-minds operations, and statutory law enforcement operations within austere and non-permissive terrains.

In urban domains, the asset provides critical operational support for crowd and riot control management upon official request from the Royal Thai Police Protection and Crowds Control Division (PDD), except during tactical emergencies in high-risk, non-permissive zones where the BPP retains immediate statutory enforcement authority.

== History ==
Established in 1951 through strategic cooperation with the United States Central Intelligence Agency the Border Patrol Police functions with substantial operational and administrative autonomy within the Royal Thai Police structure. With it's paramilitary police nature, the majority of the BPP’s founding and past commanders were former army officers, allowing for extensive integration with the military. Nowadays, all BPP officers and commanders have a policing background.

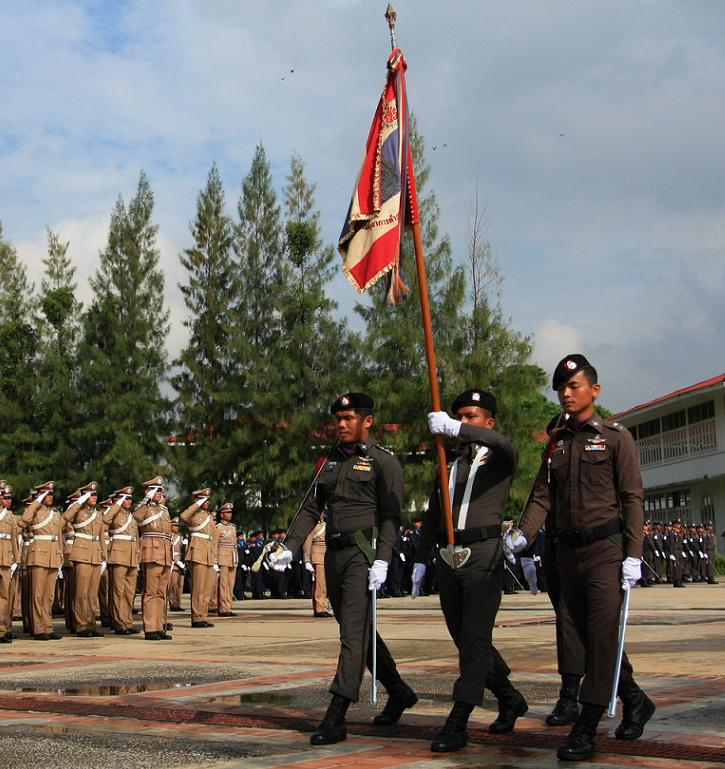
Presenting Border Patrol Police Colours

== Organization ==
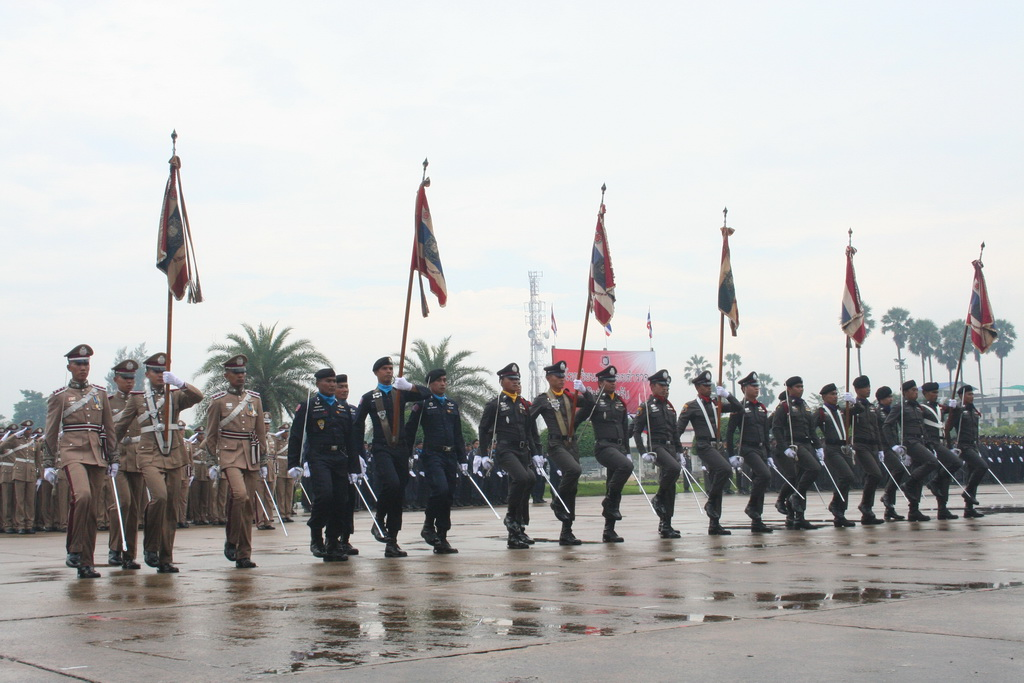
Border Patrol Police Colours

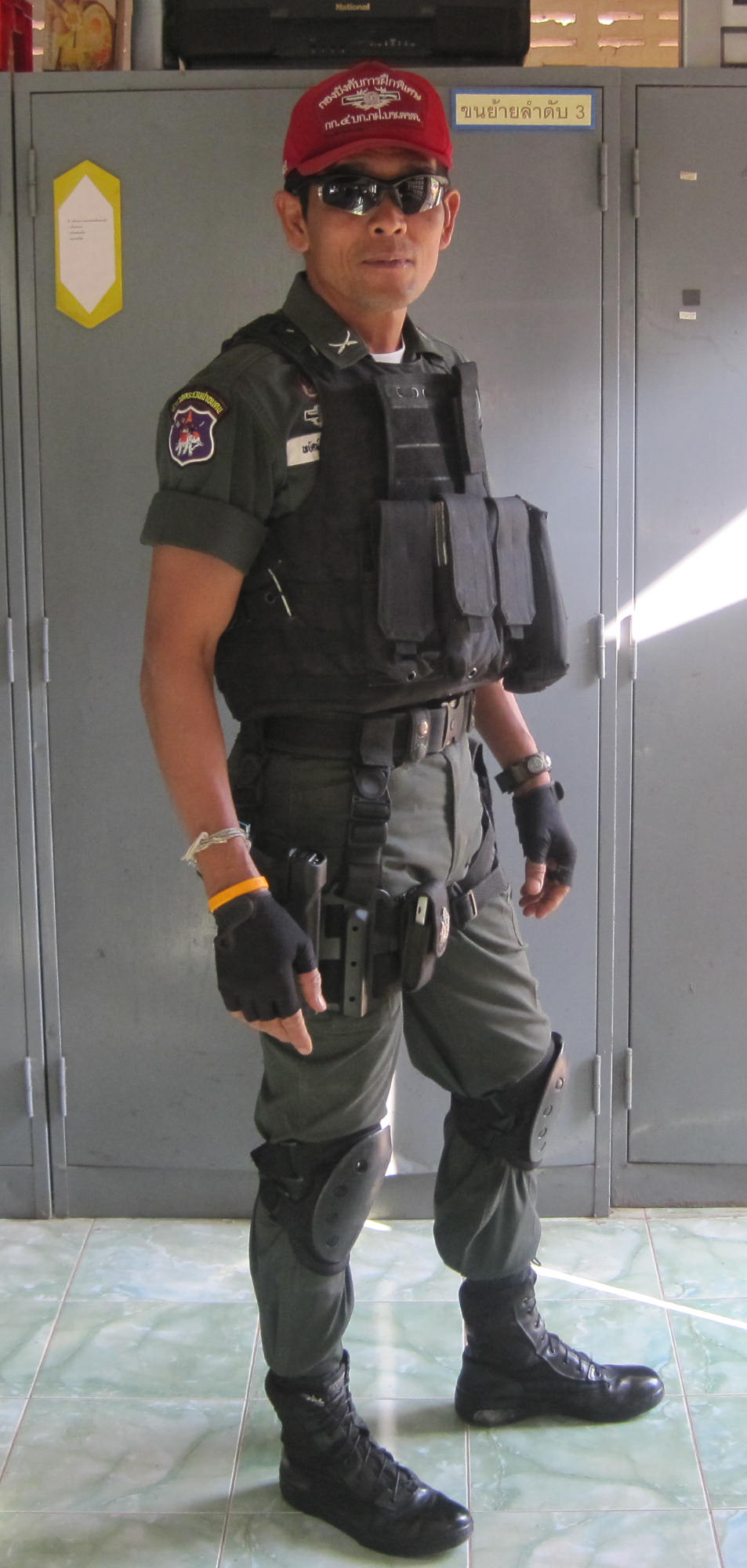
Border Patrol Police field uniform

=== National Organization ===
- Border Patrol Police
  - Headquarters Border Patrol Police Bureau
    - General Staff Division
  - Special Training Division
  - Support Division
  - Aerial Reinforcement Division aka Border Patrol Police Aerial Reinforcement Unit (PARU)
    - Naresuan 261 Special Operation Unit
    - Search and Rescue Company (SAR)
    - Special Forces Company (SFC)
  - Village Scout Center
  - 1st Border Patrol Police Regional Divisions.
    - Border Patrol Police Sub-Division 11
    - Border Patrol Police Sub-Division 12
    - Border Patrol Police Sub-Division 13
    - Border Patrol Police Sub-Division 14
  - 2nd Border Patrol Police Regional Divisions
    - Border Patrol Police Sub-Division 21
    - Border Patrol Police Sub-Division 22
    - Border Patrol Police Sub-Division 23
    - Border Patrol Police Sub-Division 24
  - 3rd Border Patrol Police Regional Divisions
    - Border Patrol Police Sub-Division 31
    - Border Patrol Police Sub-Division 32
    - Border Patrol Police Sub-Division 33
    - Border Patrol Police Sub-Division 34
  - 4th Border Patrol Police Regional Divisions
    - Border Patrol Police Sub-Division 41
    - Border Patrol Police Sub-Division 42
    - Border Patrol Police Sub-Division 43
      - DELTA Special Operations Team
      - SINGA Special Operations Team
    - Border Patrol Police Sub-Division 44
      - Long Range Surveillance Unit (LRSU)

Patch of PARU

=== Field organization ===
The fundamental operational element of the BPP is structured into highly maneuverable 32-man tactical platoons, each reinforced by specialized heavy weapons detachments strategically positioned at regional Royal Thai Police (RTP) headquarters. In high-intensity contingencies, PARU delivers critical air-mobility and rapid deployment capabilities, airlifting these tactical elements directly into volatile sectors. Equipped with modernized small arms and light weapons (SALW) systems, the BPP's operational doctrine has been profoundly enhanced by its strategic heritage; during the 1960s, United States Army Special Forces (Green Berets) advisors directly embedded with the unit to co-establish its foundational and rigorous instructional programs.

Historically and during high-intensity contingencies, the BPP has served as a vital force multiplier alongside the Thai military, frequently executing integrated joint operations under the tactical control (TACON) of the Royal Thai Army (RTA) and the Royal Thai Marine Corps (RTMC) during complex counterinsurgency and border defense campaigns.

BPP units stationed along the Cambodian and Laotian borders following the Vietnamese invasion of Cambodia in 1979 often served as a first line of defense and bore the brunt of Vietnamese attacks.

To effectively execute its tactical intelligence and reconnaissance mandates, the BPP implements strategic civic action program designed to cultivate operational rapport and establish human intelligence (HUMINT) networks within remote border communities and ethnic tribal regions. The asset actively develops and manages critical infrastructure, including remote educational facilities and tactical airstrips, while providing essential inter-agency engineering support for civilian administration developments. Furthermore, the unit delivers specialized rural medical assistance and agricultural sustainability support through these civic action programs, stabilizing volatile regions and securing vital operational access to high-risk border zones.

=== Border Patrol Police Aerial Reinforcement Unit ===
The Border Patrol Police Aerial Resupply Unit (BPP PARU) serves as the premier paramilitary police airborne tactical intervention asset of the Border Patrol Police (BPP). The unit maintains specialized operational capabilities rooted in military-grade special warfare doctrines, airborne reinforcement, high-profile protective, tactical air and heliborne insertions (including Military Free-Fall: MFF), tactical counter-terrorism, and specialized search and rescue (SAR) under complex crisis environments. Operating under the direct statutory mandate of the BPP Headquarters, PARU maintains a continuous high-readiness posture, capable of deploying specialized counter-terrorism elements and tactical assets to support any operational theater nationwide within a critical two-hour response window.

The PARU in the 1950s and 1960s was a small unit used for clandestine missions outside Thailand. It was largely Central Intelligence Agency (CIA)-funded at that time. PARU's counts its founding from 27 April 1954, when King Bhumibol visited the opening ceremony of the PARU Company's Naresuan Camp in Hua Hin.

=== Long Range Surveillance Unit ===
The Border Patrol Police has a Long Range Surveillance Unit (Thai: หน่วยเฝ้าตรวจระยะไกล aka Thai: ลาซู). Under the Border Patrol Police Division 44, Phaya Lithai Camp, Yala Province, established training courses and set up a unit since 2010.

The Long Range Surveillance Unit (LRSU) is an elite mountainous Special Weapons and Tactics (SWAT) unit entity specifically established to counter irregular forces and insurgent groups operating within the highly complex and non-permissive natural terrains of Yala Province. The LRSU has achieved significant operational success in neutralizing and dismantling insurgent strongholds across the region.

Undergoing rigorous and specialized training, its operatives possess advanced capabilities in combat patrolling, high-risk patrol and surveillance, tactical intelligence gathering under the statutory authority of the Border Patrol Police (BPP), and executing direct-action raids against strategic targets—notably through the interdiction of insurgent elements massing forces for imminent attacks, as well as strikes against tactical bases in rugged terrains, the apprehension of key insurgent leadership, and the authorized deployment of lethal force in self-defense or when suspects offer armed resistance, such as engaging in a firefight during cordoning and search operations.

Formulated as a highly adaptable SWAT asset for austere environments, the LRSU possesses 3-dimensional (3D) tactical infiltration capabilities, encompassing rotary-wing aviation insertions, terrestrial movements via tactical vehicles and low-profile civilian vehicles to maintain covert tactical blending, and riverine and lacustrine penetrations utilizing tactical flat-bottomed inflatable boats, augmented by the situational deployment of non-standard civilian watercraft to ensure low-profile tactical infiltration. Beyond rural and wilderness operations, the unit is proficiently trained in transitional operations from rural to urban environments, maintaining an intensive operational threshold in hostage rescue and domestic-level counter-terrorism operations strictly bound within the geographical jurisdiction of Yala Province.

Furthermore, the LRSU renders critical police support to civilians, possessing highly specialized proficiency in riverine and inland flood search and rescue (SAR) operations to assist civilian populations affected by floods or waterborne emergencies.

== Subordinate paramilitary forces ==
=== Volunteer Defense Corps ===
In 1954, the BPP conceptualized and operationalized the Volunteer Defense Corps (VDC), colloquially designated as the Or Sor (Thai: อส.), establishing a specialized paramilitary infrastructure tasked with domestic law enforcement and tactical crisis response. This strategic activation directly addressed escalating internal security breaches, specifically border banditry and asymmetric harassment orchestrated by subversive factions.

Mechanized as an internal defense asset, the VDC was mandated to insulate border populations against coercion and kinetic intimidation executed by communist insurgent guerrillas infiltrating from neighboring Federation of Malaya, Kingdom of Laos, Cambodia—spanning its historical transitions from the post-independence Kingdom of Cambodia through the Khmer Republic and ultimately into Democratic Kampuchea. Crucially, its primary operational doctrine centered on logistical interdiction—effectively denying insurgents access to local food supplies and resources, thereby securing vulnerable agrarian communities.

Trained under the rigid tactical doctrines of the BPP, the VDC’s operational theater was systematically expanded in 1974 by the Internal Security Operations Command (ISOC) into urban domains to neutralize left-wing ideological subversion and political instability.

By the late 1980s, the operational strength of the Volunteer Defense Corps (VDC) was recalibrated to approximately 33,000 personnel, marking a strategic reduction from its peak force posture of 52,000 in 1980. This institutional downsizing was partially absorbed through the activation and expansion of the Thahan Phran (Thai Rangers)—a specialized paramilitary light infantry organization engineered specifically to neutralize communist insurgent guerrillas. Subsequently, this irregular warfare asset underwent significant revitalization, subsequently playing a critical role in kinetic and counter-insurgency operations within the theater of the Southern Thailand insurgency since 2004.

=== Village Scouts ===
The BPP, together with the Ministry of Interior, backed and sponsored the 1971 establishment of the "Village Scouts", a right-wing rural vigilante group and paramilitary militia. The village scouts were to counter the communist insurgency and the pro-democracy movement of the 1970s. Soon after its creation, five million Thais (10 percent of the population) went through the organisation's initiation rite and took its five-day training course. The Village Scouts conducted the anti-leftist rally that led to the Thammasat University massacre and bloody coup d'état on 6 October 1976. The Village Scouts disappeared around 1981, but were revived around 2004 against the backdrop of the Muslim separatist conflict in south Thailand. The village scout concept was extended to ลูกเสือบนเครือข่ายอินเทอร์เน็ต ('Village Scouts on the Internet') internet activities with the creation of the "Cyber Scouts".

=== Thahan Phran ===
The 10,600-member Thahan Phran ("Thai Rangers") was formed as a volunteer militia force deployed to active trouble spots along the Cambodian and Burmese borders. The paramilitary organization had 32 regiments and 196 companies. The Thahan Phran gained considerable publicity and incurred significant casualties during Vietnamese bombardments and local assaults along the Cambodian border. Since 2004, they have deployed to counter the South Thailand insurgency.

== See also ==
- Royal Thai Police
  - Naresuan 261 Counter-Terrorism Unit
- Internet censorship in Thailand
- Nawaphon
