= Rubbish Collection Organization =

Thai online ultra-royalist vigilante group

Rubbish Collection Organization องค์กรเก็บขยะแผ่นดิน
- Formation: 2013
- Founder: Rienthong Nanna
- Type: Political pressure group
- Legal status: No legal status
- Purpose: Rush cases of lèse majesté in Thailand and vigilantism

The Rubbish Collection Organization (RCO; Thai: องค์กรเก็บขยะแผ่นดิน; RTGS: ongkon kep khaya phaendin) is a Thai state-sponsored online ultra-royalist vigilante group which has been characterized as fascist. Headed by Rienthong Nanna, an ultra-royalist former major general, medical doctor, and special advisor to the Prime Minister, it was founded during the 2013–2014 Thai political crisis, on the side of the People's Democratic Reform Committee, and as of July 2019 had 300,000 likes on its Facebook page.

The RCO is organized along professional military-style lines and engages in mob activism. Its stated aim is to "eradicate" Thailand's "social rubbish" and to "eradicate lèse-majesté offenders completely." The RCO seeks out potential cases of lèse-majesté and reports them to the authorities. In addition, it perpetrates systematic mobbing, seeking to disclose a victim's private address and then inciting pro-royalists to verbally abuse the victim at their home or work. The RCO has also adopted civic volunteerism and publicizes state-organized mass events, such as royalist bicycle rallies, through social media.

== Origins ==
The RCO came into operations in April 2014, one month before the 2014 military coup, allegedly on the orders of then Privy Councilor Lt. Gen. Surayud Chulanont, who headed one of the military governments following the 2006 coup. Rienthong was gradually introduced to the public as a supposedly apolitical disaffected citizen (Wutbürger), who claimed that he was working to establish a "people’s army to protect the monarchy" and that the RCO was protected by the army, a claim that was promptly denied. The RCO adopted various fascist-esque slogans, including "When you first sweep the floor, the dust will be blown all over the place, but the floor will look cleaner later on." It is believed that the RCO has received funding from the Thai military.

== Founder ==
Rienthong Nanna, who still uses his military title (major general), was a former operations director of the Army Medical Department and is director of his own private hospital, Mongkutwattana Hospital, in central Bangkok, from where he oversees the RCO. Rienthong has announced a policy to vet the social media accounts of suppliers to his hospital for loyalty to the monarchy before buying their services and also to vet the social media accounts of his patients, vowing not to treat those who may appear to be disloyal to the monarchy, despite the hospital being part of the Thai public health system. In January 2019, a case was filed to revoke Rienthong's medical license on the grounds of "discrimination, verbal abuses, and posting inappropriate statements on Facebook." In July 2020, he was appointed as special advisor to the Prime Minister with a brief of reducing the socio-economic impacts of the COVID-19 pandemic in Thailand.

== Tactics ==
The RCO engages in doxxing, the practice of investigating and making public online identities, then reports these to the authorities. Tactics have also included intimidation, by posting photos of the 6 October 1976 massacre, and posting nude or otherwise offensive photos to victims' Facebook pages, followed by allegations that the page owner had in this way committed cybercrimes. The RCO has also mobbed victims' homes and places of work. One of the early targets of the RCO was dissident poet Kamol Duangphasuk, who was subsequently assassinated. The RCO also targets victims overseas at their home addresses and their families, with one victim's parents being "forced to file a lèse-majesté case against their own daughter". [emphasis added].^{:30}

== Main campaigns ==
=== 2015 campaign ===
After the 2014 Thai military coup, there was a resurgence in state-sponsored online crackdowns and vigilante activity targeting anti-regime protesters, including by the RCO. In January 2015, the RCO targeted the United Nations High Commission for Refugees after it assisted an activist accused of lèse majesté in fleeing to New Zealand. In late September 2015, the RCO targeted Sunai Phasuk, a researcher for Human Rights Watch. In October 2015, the RCO targeted the US Embassy in Bangkok, delivering a statement to President Obama, asking him to repatriate lèse majesté who had fled overseas, including to the United Kingdom. Later the same month, the RCO directly targeted Facebook and YouTube for carrying content it deemed as causing lèse-majesté. In late 2015, Rienthong temporarily withdrew from the RCO.

=== 2016 campaign ===
In 2016, the RCO was active in seeking out Thais who did not dress in mourning wear following the death of Thai king Bhumibol Adulyadej.

=== 2020 campaign ===
In July 2020, the RCO became a protagonist in the 2020 Thai protests, targeting the student protesters. It launched its "Extinguish the Future Project," which aims "to create a list of individuals which companies, government agencies, and educational institutions must ban from being employed, enrolling for study or receiving scholarships." RCO supporters were ordered to infiltrate the protesters, discover their identities, and then engage in a mass campaign of publicly discrediting them. The campaign provoked a massive reaction on Thai social media, including from Thai stars like Intira Charoenpura, and even from some conservatives.

During the protests, Rienthong fired one of his doctors for signing a petition requesting authorities to not use violence against demonstrators.

== See also ==
- Cyber Scouts (Thailand)
- Lèse-majesté in Thailand
- Red Gaurs
- Nawaphon
- Social Sanction (Thailand)
- Thai Rangers
- Village Scouts
