= Network monarchy =

Thai political concept

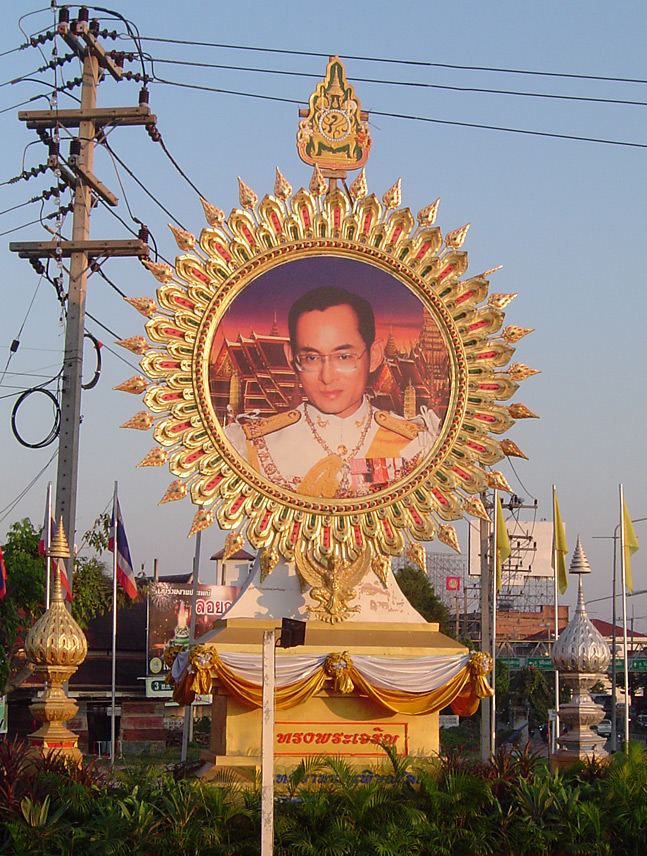
City decoration in observance of King Bhumibol's birthday in Phitsanulok, Thailand

The network monarchy is a conceptual framework developed by some academics of Thai politics to describe a political network involved in active interventions in the political process by the monarch and his proxies under the country's constitutional monarchy system. The monarch works with and through other political agencies, such as the elected parliament, and the consensus among the Thai elite is essential. The ideology is generally situated within right-wing politics, but may take on liberal features.

== Definitions ==
The term network monarchy was coined by Duncan McCargo in the 2006 journal article "Network monarchy and legitimacy crises in Thailand." It involved active interventions in the political activity by King Bhumibol and his proxies, notably former prime minister and Privy Council President, Prem Tinsulanond. It developed considerable influence, but never achieved the conditions for domination, instead working through institutions in the government or parliament. It is essentially conservative, but also took on liberal forms during the 1990s. His work argued that widely used ideas such as constitutional monarchy, bureaucratic polity, transitional democracy and political reform failed to capture the recent politics of Thailand since the 1990s. In place of these ideas, McCargo proposed a model for Thai politics from the 1973 Thai popular uprising to the Thaksin Shinawatra era where the leading network was centred on the monarchy.

Federico Ferrara claimed, shortly before the Supreme Court of Thailand delivered its verdict to seize Thaksin Shinawatra's assets, that the judiciary was a well-established part of Bhumibol's network and represented his main avenue to exercise extra-constitutional prerogatives despite having the appearance of being constitutional. He also noted how, in comparison to the Constitutional Court's 2001 acquittal of Thaksin, the judiciary was a much more important part of the "network" than it was in the past.

Asa Kumpha, Thai Khadi Research Institute, Thammasat University, attempted to give an analytical study on the relationship between the network monarchy and the Thai elite network. His study found the formation and dynamics of the network monarchy that correlates to the royal hegemony of King Bhumibol Adulyadej in each period. Asa noted that the consensus among the Thai elite is essential for the network.

== Background ==
Since the 1991 coup and the Black May crisis in 1992, Prem Tinsulanonda, President of the Privy Council of Thailand, acted on behalf of the monarch to restore political equilibrium. However, following the landslide election victories of popular prime minister Thaksin Shinawatra in 2001 and 2005, Thaksin sought to displace network monarchy with new networks of his own formulation.

The network's ability to exercise power is based partly on Bhumibol's popularity and strict control of Bhumibol's popular image. According to Jost Pachaly of the Heinrich Böll Foundation, Bhumibol "plays an important role behind the scenes. But the role is difficult to assess because nothing is reported about it and no one really knows anything specific", due to lèse-majesté laws forbidding discussion about Bhumibol's political activities. Bhumibol's popularity was demonstrated following the 2003 Phnom Penh riots in Cambodia, when hundreds of Thai protesters, enraged by rumors that Cambodian rioters had stomped on photographs of Bhumibol, gathered outside the Cambodian embassy in Bangkok. Photographs of the stomping were not published in Thailand, but were available on the internet. The situation was resolved peacefully only when Police General Sant Sarutanonda told the crowd that he had received a call from royal secretary Arsa Sarasin conveying Bhumibol's request for calm. The crowd dispersed.

== Bhumibol reign ==
Nishizaki commented that the prime minister Banharn Silpa-archa used the network monarchy to gain his popularity and political opportunities. Banharn donated a large amount of money to the Village Scouts, a right-wing, ultranationalist social movement supported by the network monarchy, which played important role in 6 October 1976 massacre. This built a relationship between him and the network. Banharn also donated money to build hospitals, roads, and schools in Suphanburi and a royal family member usually presided at the opening ceremonies. Local people supported him and perceived him as a billionaire who was loyal to the monarchy.

== Vajiralongkorn reign ==
In 2020, Supalak Ganjanakhundee of the ISEAS–Yusof Ishak Institute, observed that a "new network monarchy" was developing out of King Vajiralongkorn's personal army, the Red Rim Soldiers, with special characteristics, exempting them from the laws governing state regulations and making them no longer part of the government. The administration of the king's agencies is to be "at the royal pleasure".

== Further studies ==
In 2017, Thongchai Winichakul, renowned historian, stated that the network monarchy relies on a charismatic monarch, which leads to unstable institutions that rely on individuals. He questioned whether Thai political system may be working as an absolute monarchy in disguise.

In 2020, Nishizaki commented that the vast personal network credited to Bhumibol was not his creation alone but rather an expansion of royal family ties forged decades earlier. Rather than inventing the network monarchy, Nishizaki argues that Bhumibol simply expanded the political resources he inherited for his own purposes.

== See also ==
- Elitism
- Deep state
