= Cyber Scouts (Thailand) =

Thai online vigilante network

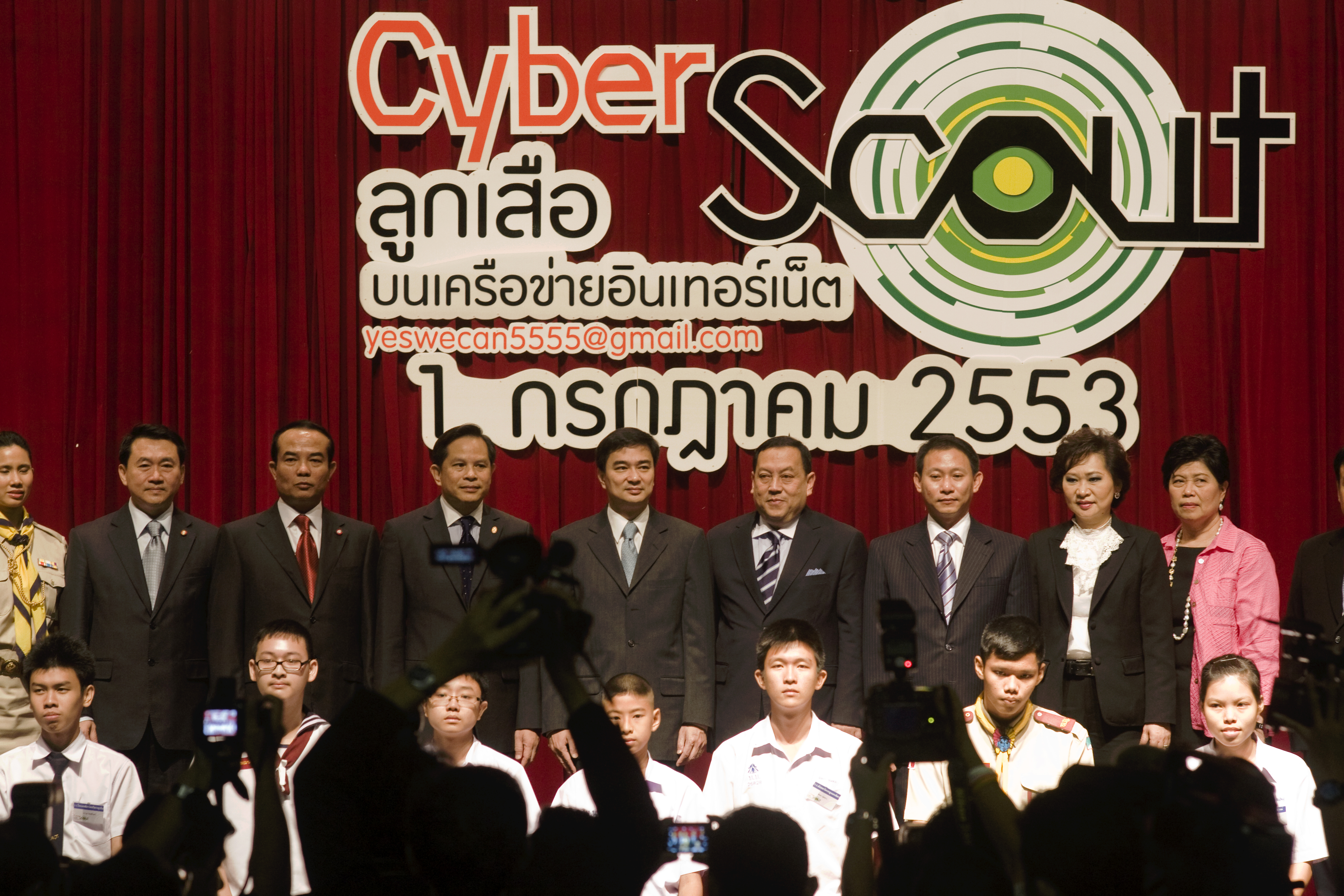
The opening ceremony of the Cyber Scout project in Bangkok on July 1, 2010.

The Cyber Scouts is a Thai state-sponsored youth-based online vigilante network that German academic Wolfram Schaffar has characterised as "reminiscent of fascist vigilante groups". It was founded in 2010 and currently operates under the Ministry of Digital Economy and Society. The program trains high school and university students nationally in ultra-royalist ideology via workshops. Its two main objectives are indoctrinating Thai youth with ultra-royalist values and creating a youth-based nationwide network dedicated to detecting and reporting lèse-majesté violations through online surveillance.

== History ==
The Cyber Scouts have been described as "reminiscent of the anticommunist, right-wing paramilitary Village Scouts of the 1970s" in that both programs are state-backed. The program was launched in December 2010 by the conservative Abhisit Vejjajiva administration, under the Thai Ministry of Justice and the Ministry for Information and Communication Technology. It was shut down in 2011 during the Yingluck Shinawatra administration, but it was reactivated by the military regime following the 2014 coup. As of 2016, 112 schools were involved, with over 120,000 members.

== Objectives ==
According to a 2010 Ministry of Justice training document, the Cyber Scouts originally had five objectives:

1. To create a Cyber Scout volunteer network... that observes... [online] behavior that is deemed a threat to national security and to defend and protect the royal institution.

2. To collect the work of the Cyber Scout volunteers.

3. To set up a network of Cyber Scout volunteers to contact.

4. To promote the moral and ethics with the help of the volunteers, to ensure the correct behavior, build reconciliation and awareness towards the use of information with regard to morality and safety of individuals in society.

5. To promote and support to various sectors of society to careful and responsible usage of information technology.

In the 2014 reboot, the objectives were "to jointly observe threats and monitor informations that are dangerous to the [monarchy] institution [and] national security, (...) to handle online information appropriately, as well as to incite to youth [with that knowledge] so that they will use technology the right way".

== Tactics ==
Participants are encouraged to register on a website and are trained in one-day workshops. They receive ideological instructions on the history and importance of the Thai monarchy and are trained in how to use Facebook; they are incentivized through a points-based system. The Cyber Scouts' tactics includes befriending potential suspects on Facebook and initiating conversations on sensitive topics. They then report alleged violations of lèse-majesté.

== See also ==
- Lèse-majesté in Thailand
- Nawaphon
- Red Gaurs
- Rubbish Collection Organization
- Social Sanction (Thailand)
- Village Scouts
