= Neal Ulevich =

American photographer

- Born: Neal Hirsh Ulevich; June 18, 1946 (age 80); Milwaukee, Wisconsin, U.S.
- Education: University of Wisconsin–Madison (BA, Journalism)
- Occupation: Photojournalist
- Employer: Associated Press (former)
- Notable work: Coverage of the 6 October 1976 massacre in Bangkok
- Awards: Pulitzer Prize for Spot News Photography (1977); World Press Photo (1976, 1985)
- Website: www.watermargin.com

Neal Hirsh Ulevich (born June 18, 1946) is an American photographer. He won a Pulitzer Prize in 1977 for "photographs of disorder and brutality in the streets of Bangkok".

== Life ==
Ulevich was born and raised in Milwaukee, Wisconsin, where he attended public and private schools before enrolling at the University of Wisconsin–Madison, where he graduated in 1968 with a BA degree in Journalism. While there, he began a career-long association with Associated Press, first as a campus correspondent, later as part-time staff. Ulevich developed a strong interest in China while a student, a fascination that determined the direction of his career.

After graduation, he worked for AP as a writer in St. Louis, Missouri, before resigning to study Chinese in Hong Kong. In 1970 friends and associates in journalism urged him to travel to Indochina to witness the U.S. incursion into Cambodia, assuring him the cross-border operation would herald "the last two weeks of the war".

He then freelanced as both writer and photojournalist and rejoined AP in the Saigon, Vietnam, bureau. He returned to the University of Wisconsin-Madison on a National Endowment for the Humanities fellowship in journalism, later resuming his AP work in Saigon. He covered the chaotic evacuation from Saigon at war’s end, departing by helicopter from the roof of the U.S. embassy.

An AP assignment to Bangkok followed. A worsening political situation in 1976 culminated in a massacre at Thammasat University. There he captured images that won the 1977 Pulitzer Prize for Spot News Photography. One of these photographs was used as the cover of the San Francisco-based punk band Dead Kennedys' 1980 single Holiday in Cambodia.

After leaving Thailand, Ulevich worked for AP as Asia Photo Editor in Tokyo and as photojournalist in Beijing. He returned to Tokyo in 1988 to supervise AP’s electronic communications for Asia.

Ulevich returned to the United States in 1990. He retired from AP to resume freelance photography in 2002.

== Awards ==
- 1985 World Press Photo, 3rd Prize, Arts and Entertainment
- 1977 Pulitzer Prize for Spot News Photography
- 1976 World Press Photo, 3rd Prize, Spot News

== Works ==
- "Hanged student outside the Thammasat" World Press Photo Spot News, 3rd prize, 1976
- Heinz Dietrich Fischer; Erika J. Fischer, eds. (2000). "About Heavy Disorder and Brutality in the Streets of Bangkok in 1976". Press photography awards, 1942-1998: from Joe Rosenthal and Horst Faas to Moneta Sleet and Stan Grossfeld. Walter de Gruyter. ISBN 978-3-598-30184-1.
