= Puangthong Pawakapan =

Thai academic and political scientist

Academic background
- Education: Thammasat University (BA); University of Wollongong (PhD)
- Thesis: War and Trade: Siamese Interventions in Cambodia, 1767-1851

Puangthong Pawakapan (née Rungswasdisab; Thai: พวงทอง ภวัครพันธุ์, RTGS: Phuangthong Phawakkhaphan) is a Thai academic and political scientist. Puangthong is an associate professor in the faculty of political science at Chulalongkorn University. Her work focuses on the Thai military, including its internal security affairs. She also manages a digital archive of records on the 6 October 1976 massacre.

In September 2024, a forum to launch the Thai language version of Puangthong's book Infiltrating Society: The Thai Military’s Internal Security Affairs was cancelled by Chulalongkorn University. The event was moved to the Jim Thompson Museum. Her book had argued that Thailand's military used infiltration tactics among the Thai public to indoctrinate citizens in its ideology.

== Publications ==
- Infiltrating Society: The Thai Military’s Internal Security Affairs (2021)
