= Ultranationalism =

Extreme form of nationalism

Ultranationalism, or extreme nationalism, is an extremist form of nationalism in which a country asserts or maintains hegemony, supremacy, or other forms of control over other nations, to pursue its specific interests. Ultranationalist entities have been associated with the engagement of political violence even during peacetime.

In ideological terms, the British political theorist Roger Griffin said that ultranationalism arises from seeing modern nation states as living organisms, and that in stark mythological ways, political campaigners have divided societies into those that are perceived as being degenerately inferior and those perceived as having great cultural destinies. Ultranationalism has been an aspect of fascism, with historic governments such as the regimes of Fascist Italy and Nazi Germany building on ultranationalist foundations by using specific plans for supposed widespread national renewal. Another major example was the Khmer Rouge regime in Democratic Kampuchea (Cambodia) that promoted ultranationalism.

== Background concepts and broader context ==
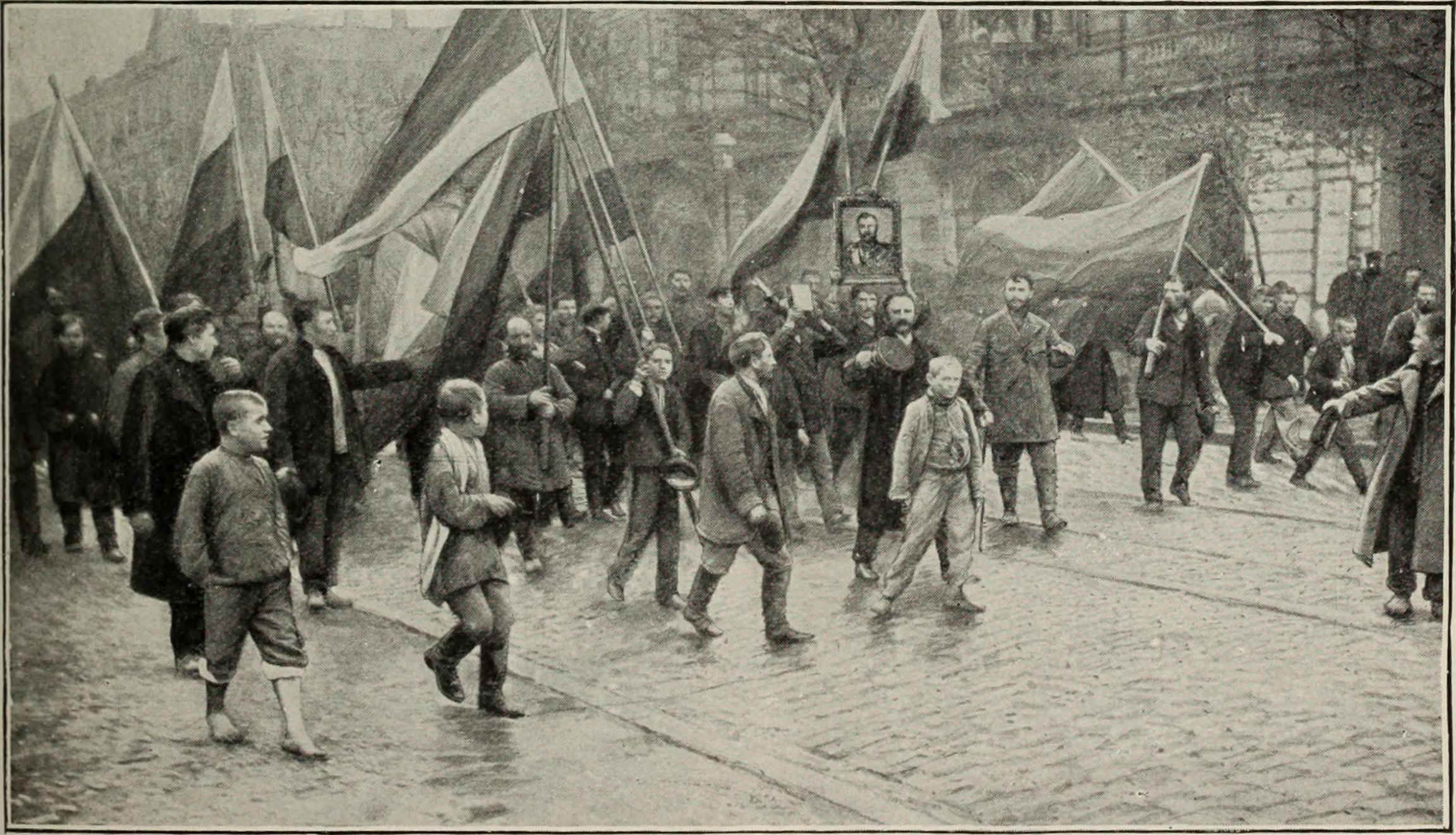
Monarchist ultranationalists within the Black Hundreds movement marched in Odesa, at the time part of Russia's empire, after the October Manifesto came out in 1905.

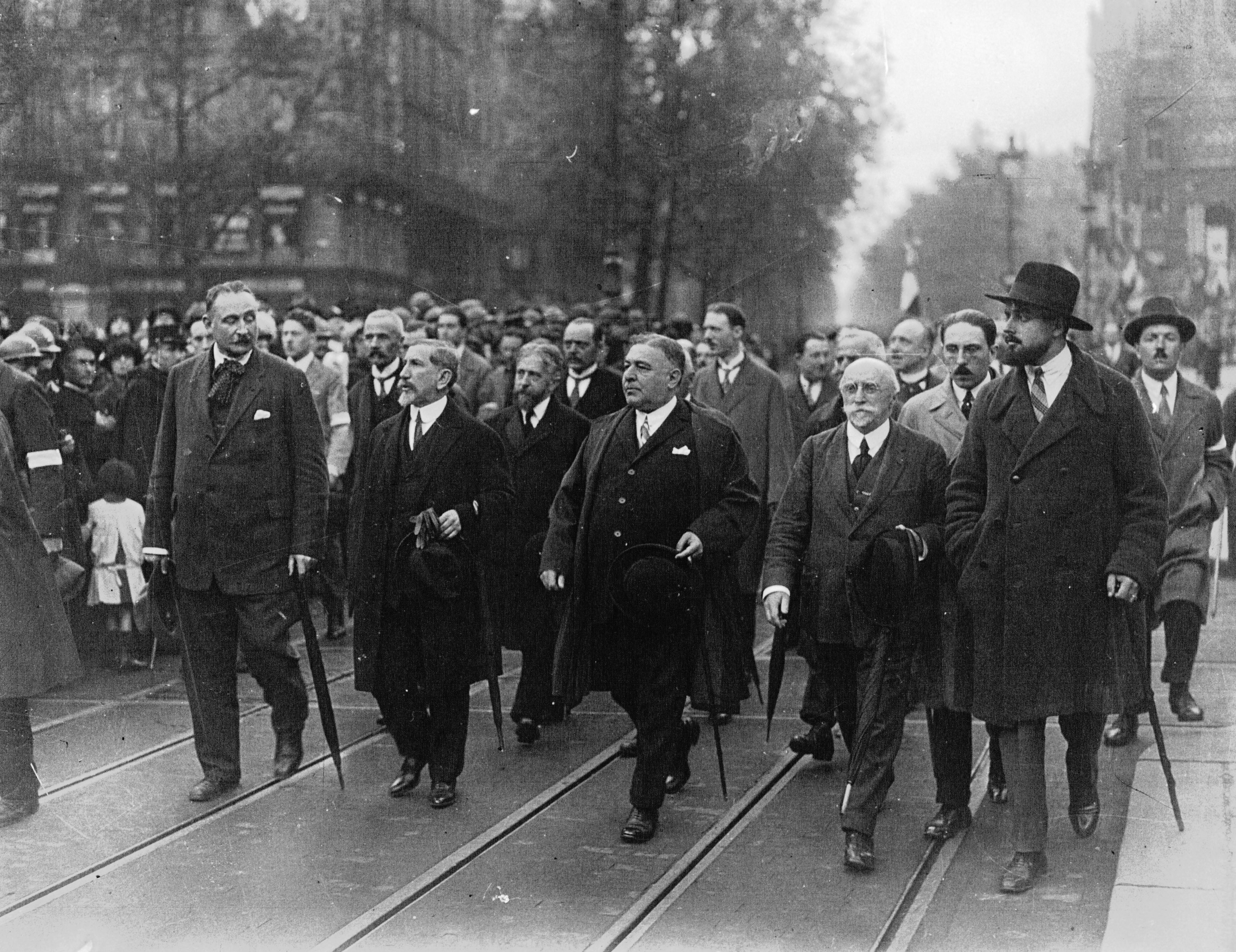
Charles Maurras with members of Action Française, a monarchist and ultranationalist political party in France, in 1927

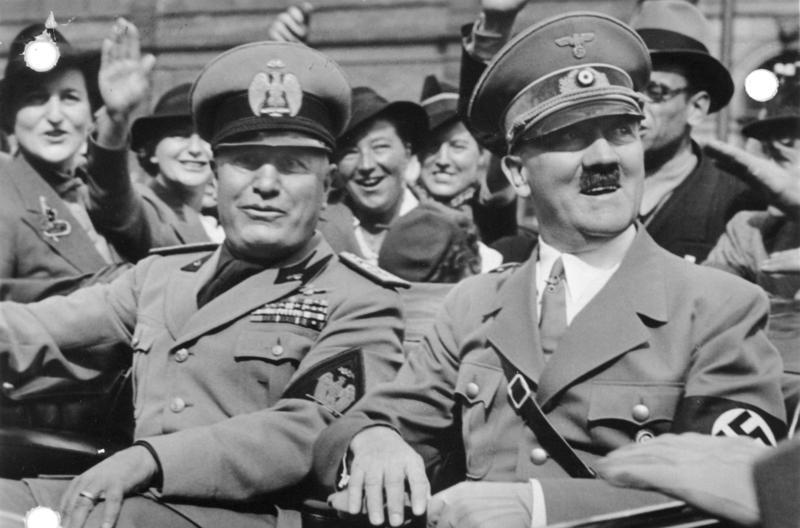
Germany's Führer Adolf Hitler (right) beside Italy's Duce Benito Mussolini (left)

British political theorist Roger Griffin argued that ultranationalism is essentially founded on xenophobia in a way that finds supposed legitimacy "through deeply mythicized narratives of past cultural or political periods of historical greatness or of old scores to settle against alleged enemies". It can also draw on "vulgarized forms" of different aspects of the natural sciences such as anthropology and genetics, eugenics specifically playing a role, in order "to rationalize ideas of national superiority and destiny, of degeneracy and subhumanness" in Griffin's opinion. According to Griffin, ultranationalists view the modern nation state as a living organism directly akin to a physical person such that it can decay, grow, die, and additionally can experience rebirth. He highlighted Nazi Germany as a regime founded on ultranationalism.

Ultranationalist activism can adopt varying attitudes towards historical traditions within the populace. For instance, the British Union of Fascists adopted a secularist-minded platform centered on perceived technological progress. In contrast, the Iron Guard in the Kingdom of Romania utilized a hardline form of mysticism-driven religion to encourage determination among the nation's ultranationalists. Nonetheless, obsessive views on ethnicity and other divisions as well as connecting politics to motifs of sacrifice generally constitute the psychological framework behind these movements.

According to American scholar Janusz Bugajski, summing up the doctrine in practical terms, "in its most extreme or developed forms, ultra-nationalism resembles fascism, marked by a xenophobic disdain of other nations, support for authoritarian political arrangements verging on totalitarianism, and a mythical emphasis on the 'organic unity' between a charismatic leader, an organizationally amorphous movement-type party, and the nation." Bugajski believes that civic nationalism and the related concept of patriotism both can contain significantly positive elements, contributing to the common social good at times such as during national calamities. In his view, these doctrines stand in contrast to the extreme approach of certain ideologies with more irrational actions.

== Historical movements and analysis ==
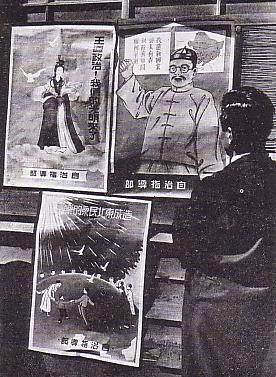
In 1930s and 1940s era ultranationalist Japan, the state routinely distributed political propaganda preaching the virtues of domination and expansion, with this photograph showing efforts in Manchukuo.

American historian Walter Skya wrote in Japan's Holy War: The Ideology of Radical Shinto Ultranationalism that ultranationalism in Japan drew upon traditional Shinto spiritual beliefs and militaristic attitudes regarding the nation's racial identity. By the early 20th century, fanaticism arising from this combination of ethnic nationalism and religious nationalism caused opposition to democratic governance and support for Japanese territorial expansion. Skya particularly observed in his work the connection between ultranationalism and political violence by citing how between 1921 and 1936 three serving and two former Prime Ministers of Japan were assassinated. The totalitarian Japanese government of the 1930s and 1940s (Shōwa Japan) did not just rely on encouragement by the country's military. It additionally received widespread popular support.

Cambodian historian Sambo Manara found that the belief system sets forth a vision of supremacism in terms of international relations whereby xenophobia or hatred of foreigners to the point of extremism leads to policies of social separation and segregation. He argued that the Cambodian genocide is a specific example of this ideology when it is applied in practice. He stated, "Obviously, it was ultranationalism, combined with the notion of class struggle in communism and a group of politicians, which lead to the establishment of Democratic Kampuchea, a ruthless regime which claimed approximately three million lives", with militant leaders finally deciding to "cut all diplomatic and economic ties with almost all countries" due to a "narrow-minded doctrine without taking into account all the losses they would face". In Manara's opinion, "this effectively destroyed the nation."

The totalitarian dictatorship of the Romanian leader Nicolae Ceaușescu has been described as an example of Communism taking an ultranationalist approach by Haaretz, which cited the antisemitism of Ceaușescu in terms of actions such as his historical denialism of the Holocaust. He also made efforts to purge Romanians who had Jewish backgrounds from positions of political authority. Haaretz has also labeled the Hungarian Prime Minister Viktor Orbán an ultranationalist due to his views on autocratic rule and racial identity, particularly Orbán's public condemnation of "race-mixing". He has also been called an ultranationalist by NPR, an American news agency, citing his opposition to democratic liberalism.

In late 2015, the Israeli political journalist Gideon Levy wrote that the Israeli–Palestinian conflict has led to the decay of the civil society within Israel, with an ultranationalist movement that "bases its power on incitement to hatred" using "folkloric religion" gaining ground over decades. He wrote:

"They were the only ones willing to fight for a collective goal. They did not rule out any means. They extorted and exploited the weaknesses of government, the guilt feelings and confusion of the secular camp, and they won. They did so systematically and smartly: First they established the foundation of their existence, the settlement enterprise. After they achieved their goal – the killing off of any diplomatic agreement and destruction of the two-state solution – they were free to turn to their next target: taking control of the public debate in Israel on the road to changing its power structure, character and substance."

Russian irredentism, in which a militant imperial state that stretches across both Asia and Europe without regard for current international borders is proposed, has been described as ultranationalism by the Los Angeles Times, with the aggressive actions of Russian President Vladimir Putin being credited as an evolution of political arguments made by multiple figures in the past. Examples include Nikolai Berdyaev, Aleksandr Dugin (the author of 1997's The Foundations of Geopolitics: The Geopolitical Future of Russia), Lev Gumilyov, and Ivan Ilyin. The newspaper highlighted the justifications given in support of the 2022 Russian invasion of Ukraine, quoting Putin's declaration that he must militarily combat an "empire of lies", created by the United States in order to justify its desire to suffocate Russia.

In a 2021 story, Bloomberg News stated that the rise of ultranationalist viewpoints in China, particularly in terms of those who advocate extremism on social media, presents a direct challenge to the current government of the nation, with the paramount leader Xi Jinping facing opposition to his attempts to set forth climate change-based economic reforms in relation to greenhouse gases. According to Bloomberg, Chinese political activists asserted a conspiracy theory that said that the reforms represent some kind of capitulation to foreign interests at the expense of individual Chinese people. Environmentalist policies have come into being in a complex fashion inside China, facing complicated opinions among many.

Under the rule of Mohammed bin Salman, who formally serves as a Crown Prince, Saudi Arabia has been described by multiple analysts as embracing ultranationalism in a shift away from the government's previous reliance on Islamist political arguments. For instance, France 24 stated in a 2019 report that while "promoting ultra-nationalism" the Crown Prince had introduced "glitzy concerts, magic shows and sporting extravaganzas with thumping after parties". Also in 2019, the Financial Times likewise described the ideological shift as "a wave" that the leader had "swept across the kingdom".

=== Blind nationalism ===
The term "blind nationalism" has been often used to describe more extreme forms of ultranationalism, such as Nazism, Fascism and chauvinism. It is primarily centered around familial militarism, love of personality cults, classism, pride for national symbolism, origin and founding myths, and the saintification of nationalist figures. It is similar to the disdain in expansionist nationalism towards all foreign nations and outsiders. A noteworthy exception is many nationalists believe in peace through marriage between social groups. It is the nationalism "which does not allow the rational nature of the human mind to assert itself".

The term was used to explain the totalitarian and authoritarian regimes in the Interwar period, which eventually led to World War II. The term is sometimes associated with American expansionism. The earliest known use of the term is in the 1908 book Racial Problems in Hungary by British historian Robert William Seton-Watson:

Needlessly to say, the attitude of the Magyar Press corresponded to that of the parliamentary Jingoes; and even the Pester Lloyd, which treated the matter with conspicuous moderation, wrote as follows: "We shall say no more of the Hlinkas and the Hodžas. These are small fry, who live upon blind nationalism, just as those amongst us who rise to honours and riches through frenzied Chauvinism. People of that sort one seizes by the collar if they break the law, and the basta."

The term has also been adapted by activists, such as David Niose:

The staggering lack of knowledge, combined with a blind and emotional patriotism, is a cause for disaster. The result is a proliferation of uninformed American exceptionalism that is akin to a social narcissism, a self-centered sense of importance and superiority that can have dire consequences."

== Ultranationalist political parties ==
=== Currently represented in national governments or legislatures ===
Many political parties have been described as ultranationalist.

- Afghanistan: Taliban
- Armenia: Republican Party of Armenia
- Australia: Pauline Hanson's One Nation
- Austria: Freedom Party of Austria
- Belgium: Vlaams Belang
- Bosnia and Herzegovina: United Srpska
- Bulgaria: Revival,
- Chile: Republican Party
- Colombia: National Salvation Movement, Defenders of the Homeland
- Croatia: Homeland Movement
- Cyprus: ELAM
- Czech Republic: Freedom and Direct Democracy
- Denmark: Danish People's Party
- Estonia: Conservative People's Party of Estonia
- France: National Rally
- Finland: Finns Party
- Georgia: People's Power
- Germany: Alternative for Germany
- Greece: Spartans, Greek Solution, Victory
- Hungary: Our Homeland Movement
- India: Shiv Sena
- Israel: Otzma Yehudit, Religious Zionist Party, Zehut
- Italy: Brothers of Italy
- Japan: Conservative Party of Japan, Sanseitō
- Myanmar: Union Solidarity and Development Party
- Namibia: Namibian Economic Freedom Fighters
- Netherlands: Party for Freedom, Forum for Democracy
- Poland: Confederation Liberty and Independence (National Movement), Confederation of the Polish Crown
- Portugal: Chega
- Romania: Alliance for the Union of Romanians, S.O.S. Romania, Party of Young People
- Russia: Liberal Democratic Party of Russia, Rodina
- Serbia: Serbian Party Oathkeepers Serbian Radical Party
- South Africa: Economic Freedom Fighters, uMkhonto weSizwe
- Slovakia: Slovak National Party, Rural Party
- Spain: Vox
- Sweden: Sweden Democrats
- Switzerland: Swiss People's Party
- Thailand: Palang Pracharath Party, United Thai Nation Party
- Turkey: Nationalist Movement Party
- Ukraine: Svoboda

Several political parties have been described as having ultranationalist factions.

- Argentina: La Libertad Avanza
- Bosnia and Herzegovina: Alliance of Independent Social Democrats, Croatian Democratic Union of Bosnia and Herzegovina
- Brazil: Liberal Party
- China: Chinese Communist Party
- Georgia: Georgian Dream
- Hungary: Fidesz
- India: Bharatiya Janata Party
- Indonesia: Gerindra
- Ireland: Sinn Féin
- Israel: Likud
- Italy: Lega
- Japan: Liberal Democratic Party
- North Korea: Workers' Party of Korea
- Palestine: Hamas
- Poland: Law and Justice
- Russia: United Russia
- Serbia: Serbian Progressive Party
- Slovakia: Smer-SD
- United Kingdom: Democratic Unionist Party (Northern Ireland)

=== Represented parties with former ultranationalist tendencies or factions ===
Several political parties historically had ultranationalist tendencies.

- Bosnia and Herzegovina: Serb Democratic Party
- (Taiwan) China: Kuomintang
- Hungary: Jobbik
- Indonesia: Golkar
- Lebanon: Kataeb Party
- Malaysia: United Malays National Organisation
- North Macedonia: VMRO-DPMNE
- Serbia: Serbian Renewal Movement
- Syria: Syrian Social Nationalist Party
- Zimbabwe: ZANU–PF

Several political parties have historically been described as having ultranationalist factions.

- Taiwan: Democratic Progressive Party
- Turkey: Good Party

=== Formerly represented in national governments or legislatures ===
- Belgium: Vlaams Blok
- Bulgaria: Attack, VMRO, National Front for the Salvation of Bulgaria, Velichie
- Cambodia: Communist Party of Kampuchea
- Croatia: Ustaše, Croatian Party of Rights, Croatian Pure Party of Rights
- Czech Republic: Rally for the Republic – Republican Party of Czechoslovakia, National Fascist Community
- Finland: Patriotic People's Movement
- Germany: Nazi Party, German National People's Party, German Right Party
- Greece: Freethinkers' Party, Golden Dawn, Popular Orthodox Rally
- Hungary: Arrow Cross Party, Unity Party, Hungarian Justice and Life Party
- India: Hindu Mahasabha
- Iran: Pan-Iranist Party
- Ireland: National Party
- Israel: Movement for Greater Israel, Kach, Religious Zionist Party, Tehiya, Moledet, Hatikva, Jewish National Front, Herut – The National Movement
- Italy: National Fascist Party, Italian Social Movement
- Japan: Imperial Rule Assistance Association
- Poland: Camp of National Unity, United Poland
- Portugal: National Union
- Philippines: Kilusang Bagong Lipunan
- Romania: Iron Guard, National Christian Party, National-Christian Defense League, Romanian National Unity Party, Greater Romania Party
- Rwanda: Coalition for the Defence of the Republic
- Serbia: Dveri, Party of Serbian Unity,
- Slovakia: Slovak People's Party, People's Party Our Slovakia, Republic
- South Africa: National Party, Conservative Party
- South Korea: National Youth
- Spain: FET y de las JONS
- Syria: Arab Socialist Ba'ath Party – Syria Region
- Taiwan: New Party, Taiwan Solidarity Union
- Thailand: Seri Manangkhasila Party
- Turkey: Republican Villagers Nation Party, Victory Party, Great Union Party
- Ukraine: Right Sector
- United Kingdom: UK Independence Party

== Ultranationalist organizations ==
- Australia: National Socialist Network
- Chile: Social Patriot Movement
- (Taiwan) China: Blue Shirts Society
- Colombia: United Self-Defense Forces of Colombia
- Finland: Suomen Sisu
- France: Action Française, Bloc Identitaire
- India: Rashtriya Swayamsevak Sangh, Bajrang Dal
- Indonesia: Pancasila Youth
- Iraq: Golden Square
- Israel: Im Tirtzu, Lehava, Lehi
- Ireland: Army Comrades Association
- Italy: CasaPound
- Japan: Nippon Kaigi, Zaitokukai
- Latvia: Pērkonkrusts
- Malaysia: Perkasa
- Mexico: Nationalist Front of Mexico, National Synarchist Union, Revolutionary Mexicanist Action
- Myanmar: Patriotic Association of Myanmar
- New Zealand: New Zealand National Front
- Palestine: Palestinian Islamic Jihad
- Poland: All-Polish Youth
- Russia: Club of Angry Patriots, Night Wolves, Russian Imperial Movement, Wagner Group
- South Korea: White Shirts Society
- Sri Lanka: Bodu Bala Sena, Sinhala Ravaya
- Thailand: Social Sanction
- Turkey: Grey Wolves, Turkish Revenge Brigade
- Ukraine: Azov Brigade
- United Kingdom: English Defence League, Siol nan Gaidheal (Scotland)
- United States: Proud Boys, Patriot Front, Nationalist Social Club-131, Aryan Brotherhood, Identity Evropa

== Ultranationalist terrorism ==
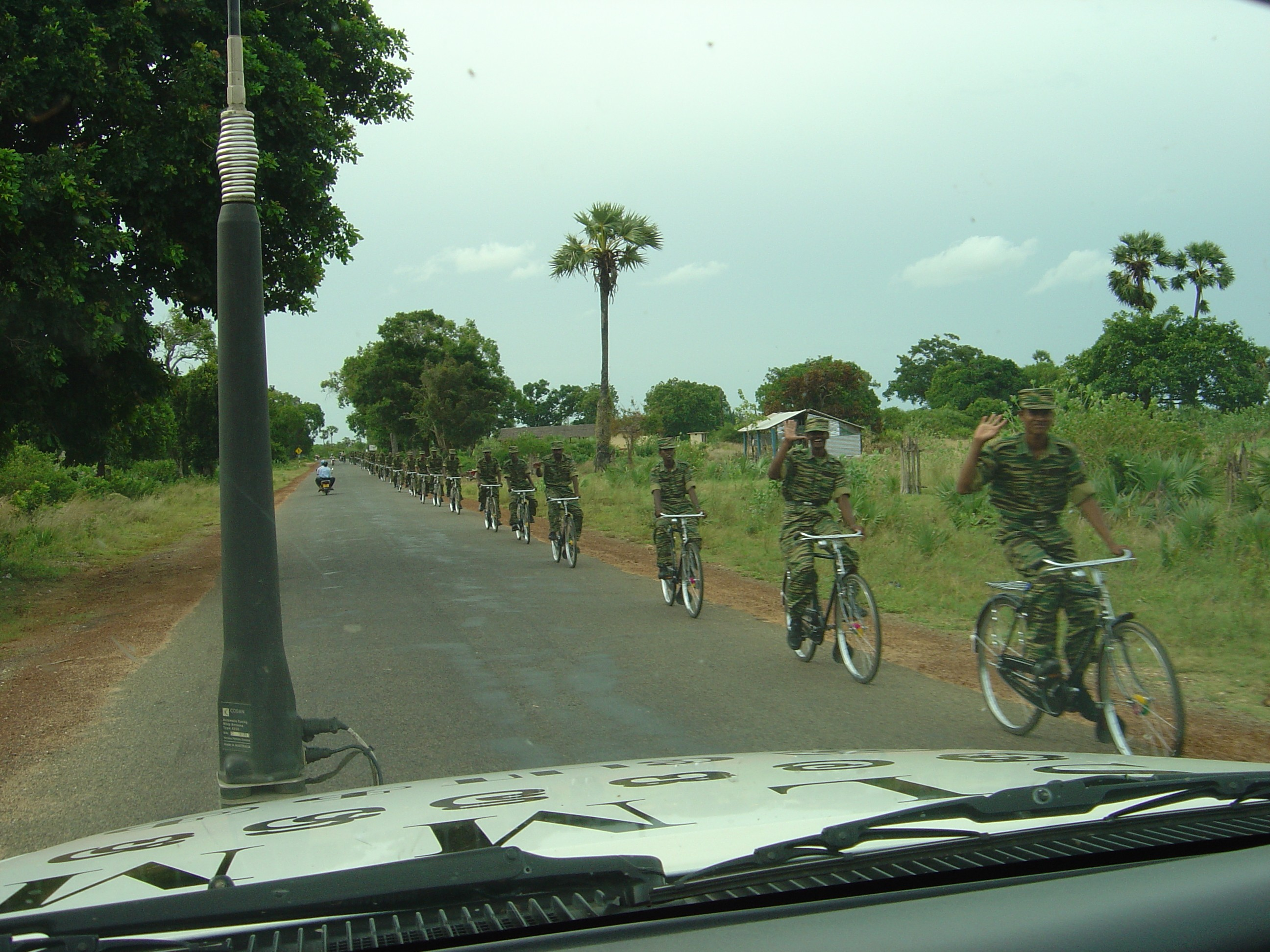
A group of bicycle infantry militants that fought in the Liberation Tigers of Tamil Eelam (LTTE) travel just north of Kilinochchi inside of Sri Lanka in June 2004.

Arising out of strident Sri Lankan Tamil nationalism, with differing ethnic and religious groups placed at odds, the militant faction known as the Liberation Tigers of Tamil Eelam (LTTE) orchestrated a decades long campaign of terrorism in the country of Sri Lanka, which is inside of the Indian Ocean and has been influenced by broader socio-political trends. Both ultranationalism and revolutionary ideologies aligned against capitalist policies influencing Sri Lankan life motivated the organization as it undertook a series of violent actions against both the national government and the supporters of the state. These attacks have collectively caused a large number of civilian deaths. For example, the Anuradhapura massacre committed by the LTTE on 14 May 1985 resulted in the killing of over one-hundred individuals inside of a holy city associated with local Buddhist worshippers. The militants deliberately targeted civilians socializing outdoors, such as by executing an elderly florist serving religious travelers.

In the context of the LTTE's militant campaign, the Journal of Hate Studies found in a 2006 analysis that "ultranationalism subordinates all other claims for loyalty and allegiance" given that "[l]oyalty to the nation transcends loyalty to the family". Thus, "this notion explains the commitment of Tamil Tiger nationalists to [even] engage in suicide missions", since the academic journal stated that "[u]ltranationalist loyalty demands the willingness to sacrifice the self". In conclusion, the publication reported that an "extremist nationalist claim not only is understood as supreme, but [it] also is presented as urgent" and then demands political activists "must engage in preventive measures, such as ethnic cleansing or deportation".

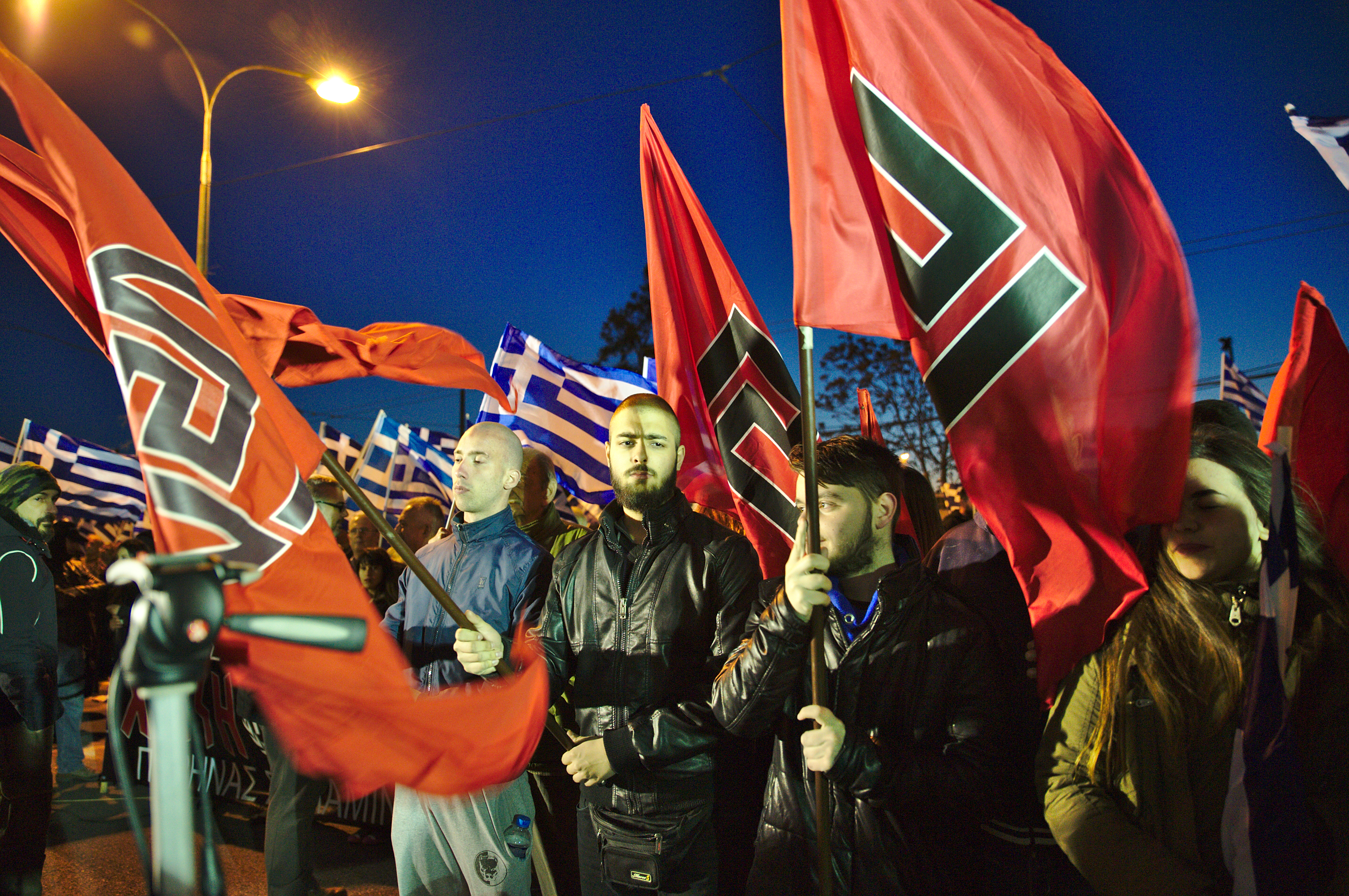
Golden Dawn activists rally in Athens during a March 2015 event.

The assassination of Pavlos Fyssas in September 2013, a hip-hop musician with left-wing views, from stabbing wounds to the heart and ribs that occurred after his surrounding by multiple dozen Golden Dawn militants triggered widespread outrage at the Greek political organization. The ultranationalist attack occurred in an Athens suburb and resulted in a police crackdown with several arrests. The then Ministry of Public Order and Citizen Protection Nikos Dendias remarked that the "abominable murder" done "by an attacker sympathizing with Golden Dawn" publicly "illustrates, in the clearest way, the intentions of neo-Nazism".

At the same, Golden Dawn held 18 of the 300 seats in the Hellenic Parliament. Characterized as an extremist political party directly adapting the beliefs of Adolf Hitler, support for its ultranationalism increased in the context of the debate over spiking immigration to Greece. The Greek legal system ultimately investigated the assassination and other acts of violence with the outcome of an October 2020 verdict by the Athens Court of Appeals wiping out the party's leadership through prison sentences. Looking back, The Guardian reported in 2021, "Golden Dawn hit squads sowed terror on the streets, targeting immigrants, left wing trade unionists and other perceived opponents before a party operative ultimately confessed to the killing of Fyssas."

== Portrayals of ultranationalism in fiction ==
The action film Air Force One features a terrorist mastermind named Egor Korshunov, played by actor Gary Oldman, who kidnaps a set of hostages including the United States president by hijacking the leader's plane. Korshunov seeks revenge due to the arrest of Kazakh dictator Ivan Radek, played by actor Jürgen Prochnow, and the militant became an ultranationalist radical after having formerly served as a Soviet soldier. In February 2022, the United States Armed Forces related website Military.com published a story labeling the character as one of the best "Russian Movie Villains" in American cinematic history. Writer Todd McCarthy of Variety also lauded the nature of Oldman's "fanatical" character, with McCarthy stating that "in his second malevolent lead of the summer, after The Fifth Element, [he] registers strongly as a veteran of the Afghan campaign pushed to desperate lengths to newly ennoble his country."

The Israeli movie Incitement portrayals a fictionalized account of ultranationalist activist and murderer Yigal Amir. The production details his personal life prior to his assassination of Israeli Prime Minister Yitzhak Rabin. Film critic Nell Minow stated that the killer, played by actor Yehuda Nahari, projects a superficial charm and skill at persuasion while at the same time failing to generate audience sympathy due to his true nature still coming out. Amir seeing himself in a callous, "instrumentalist" way as a living weapon up to and including Rabin's assassination feeds into, in Minow's opinion, the movie's "chillingly" thriller-type quality. Writer Carla Hay of CultureMixOnline.com also found Nahari's performance to be a compelling portrayal of a sociopath in film, with much left to audience interpretations.

The 2007 video game Call of Duty 4: Modern Warfare gained notice for its depiction of a civil war inside Russia between the country's government and an ultranationalist faction. Its sequels, Call of Duty: Modern Warfare 2 (2009) and Call of Duty: Modern Warfare 3 (2011), are set in the aftermath of an ultranationalist coup d'état in Russia and a subsequent war involving the American military. Militant leader Vladimir Makarov, a character in multiple games, notably declares at one point, "Russia will take all of Europe, even if it must stand upon a pile of ashes."

== See also ==
- Global Times – ultra-nationalistic Chinese media
- Ilminism
- Kahanism
- Neo-Zionism
- Palingenesis
- Putinism
- Ultranationalism in Japan (Uyoku dantai)
- Völkisch nationalism
- Wolf warrior diplomacy
