= 6 October 1976 massacre =

Killings of student protestors in Thailand

- Part of the Cold War in Asia
- A crowd looks on, some with smiles on their faces, as a man uses a folding chair to beat the hanged body of an unknown student just outside the university. Photo by Neal Ulevich.
- Location: 13°45′21″N 100°29′27″E; Thammasat University and Sanam Luang in Bangkok, Thailand
- Date: 6 October 1976; 50 years ago 05:30–11:30 (UTC+7)
- Target: Students and leftist protesters (some accused as leftists)
- Attack type: Crackdown and lynching
- Deaths: Protestors: 40, (Unofficial death-toll estimated by Puey Ungphakorn: 100+ Ruam Katanyu Foundation: 500+ people); Perpetrators: 5
- Injuries: Official estimate: 167
- Perpetrators: Royal Thai Police; Village Scouts; Nawaphon; Red Gaurs; Right-wing bystanders
- Motive: Anti-communism; Right-wing extremism; Ultra-royalism; Ultranationalism
- Website: doct6.com

The 6 October 1976 massacre, also known as the 6 October event (Thai: เหตุการณ์ 6 ตุลา RTGS: Hetkan Hok Tula) in Thailand, was a violent crackdown by Thai police and lynching by right-wing paramilitaries and bystanders against leftist protesters who had occupied Bangkok's Thammasat University and the adjacent Sanam Luang, on 6 October 1976. Prior to the massacre, thousands of leftists, including students, workers and others, had been holding ongoing demonstrations against the return of exiled former Prime Minister Thanom Kittikachorn to Thailand since mid-September. Official reports state that 46 were killed (on both sides) and 167 were wounded, while unofficial reports state that more than 100 demonstrators were killed. In the "Documentation of Oct 6" project, historian Thongchai Winichakul argued that the official death toll should be 45, since one demonstrator died in jail after the incident.

In the aftermath of the events of 14 October 1973, the military dictatorship which had ruled Thailand for more than a decade was overthrown. Political, economic and ideological factors caused the society to polarize into socialist-minded left, and conservative and royalist right camps. The unstable political climate which was exacerbated by the existence of fragile coalition governments, frequent strikes and protests, and the rise of communist governments in neighboring countries led at least two factions of the armed forces to conclude that they needed to launch another coup in order to restore order; one faction plotted to bring Thanom back in order to provoke turmoil which could be used to justify a coup.

On 19 September 1976, Thanom returned to Thailand, was instantly ordained at Wat Bowonniwet Vihara, and was visited by the King and the Queen, resulting in anti-Thanom protests and demonstrations. On 5 October, the protesters were accused of lese-majeste following a mock play which led to right-wing allegations that its actor looked like the Crown Prince; the police and rightist paramilitary groups then gathered outside the university. Between 05:30–11:30 on 6 October, the police used war-grade weapons, including assault rifles, grenade launchers, anti-armor rounds, and grenades, to wage the crackdown against the surrounded protesters who briefly tried to defend themselves but they were quickly defeated.

Some scholars have taken the position that the monarchy partly contributed to the events which unfolded by supporting Thanom's visit.

== Background ==
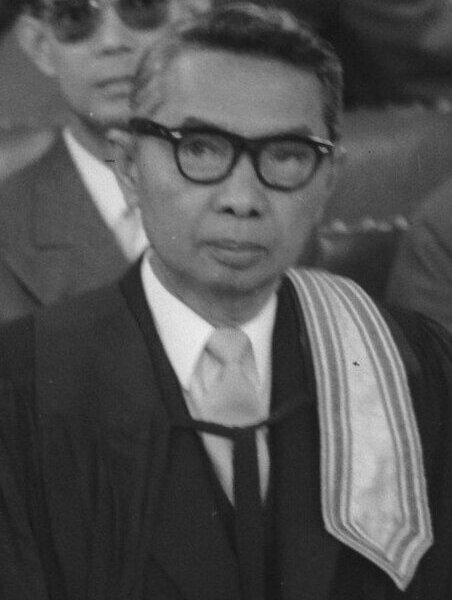
Prime Minister Seni Pramoj

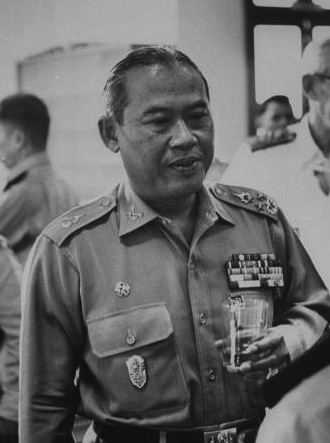
The return of Thanom Kittikachorn caused the sit-in at Thammasat University prior to the massacre.

The 14 October 1973 uprising overthrew the unpopular regime of Field Marshal Thanom Kittikachorn, and saw him flee Thailand together with Field Marshal Praphas Charusathien and Colonel Narong Kittikachorn, collectively known as the "three tyrants". Growing unrest and instability from 1973 to 1976, as well as the fear of communism from neighboring countries spreading to Thailand and threatening the interests of the monarchy and the military, convinced the latter to bring former leaders Thanom and Praphas back to Thailand to provoke turmoil and justify another coup to restore order. It is told that in February 1976, admiral Sangad Chaloryu, Commander of the Armed Force and eventual coup leader of 6 October 1976, got an audience with the King and ask him for permission for a coup. The King did not forbid the admiral, and told him to ask Thanin Kraivichien, a staunch royalist and anti-communist judge and the next prime minister, for advice.

In response to Praphas's return on 17 August 1976, thousands of students demonstrated at Thammasat University for four days until a deadly clash with Red Gaur and Nawaphon. Apparently the coup plotters were not ready yet, and Praphas left the country. One month later, on 19 September, Thanom returned to Thailand and headed directly to Wat Bowonniwet Vihara, a temple heavily associated with royalty, where he was ordained as a monk in a private ceremony. Massive anti-Thanom protests broke out as the government faced an internal crisis after Prime Minister Seni Pramoj's attempted resignation was rejected by the Thai Parliament. On 23 September, the King and the Queen visited Thanom at the temple, with one lady-in-waiting reportedly overhearing that the queen had prior knowledge of the arson at the temple. "[I] plea[d with] the people to help prevent [this]. Don't let mean people destroy the temple."

On 24 September, in Nakhon Pathom, a small city just west of Bangkok, two labor activists posting anti-Thanom posters were attacked and beaten to death, their bodies then being hung from a gate. The murders were soon shown to have been committed by members of the Thai police. A dramatization of this hanging was staged by student protesters at Thammasat University on 4 October. The following day, as Seni struggled to put together his cabinet, a Thai language newspaper, Dao Siam (ดาวสยาม), published a photograph of the mock hanging on its front page, pointing out that the student at the end of the noose allegedly bore a resemblance to Crown Prince Vajiralongkorn. Army-controlled radio stations promptly accused the student protesters of lèse-majesté and coordinated royalist and rightist paramilitary forces: the Village Scouts, Nawaphon, and Red Gaurs, to assemble. Units of Thai Border Police, known to have had a close relationship with the monarchy, were also ordered to move into Bangkok without the Prime Minister's knowledge. At dusk on 5 October, about 4,000 members of the paramilitary forces, joined by uniformed police, gathered opposite Thammasat University. The massacre took place the following day.

== Massacre ==
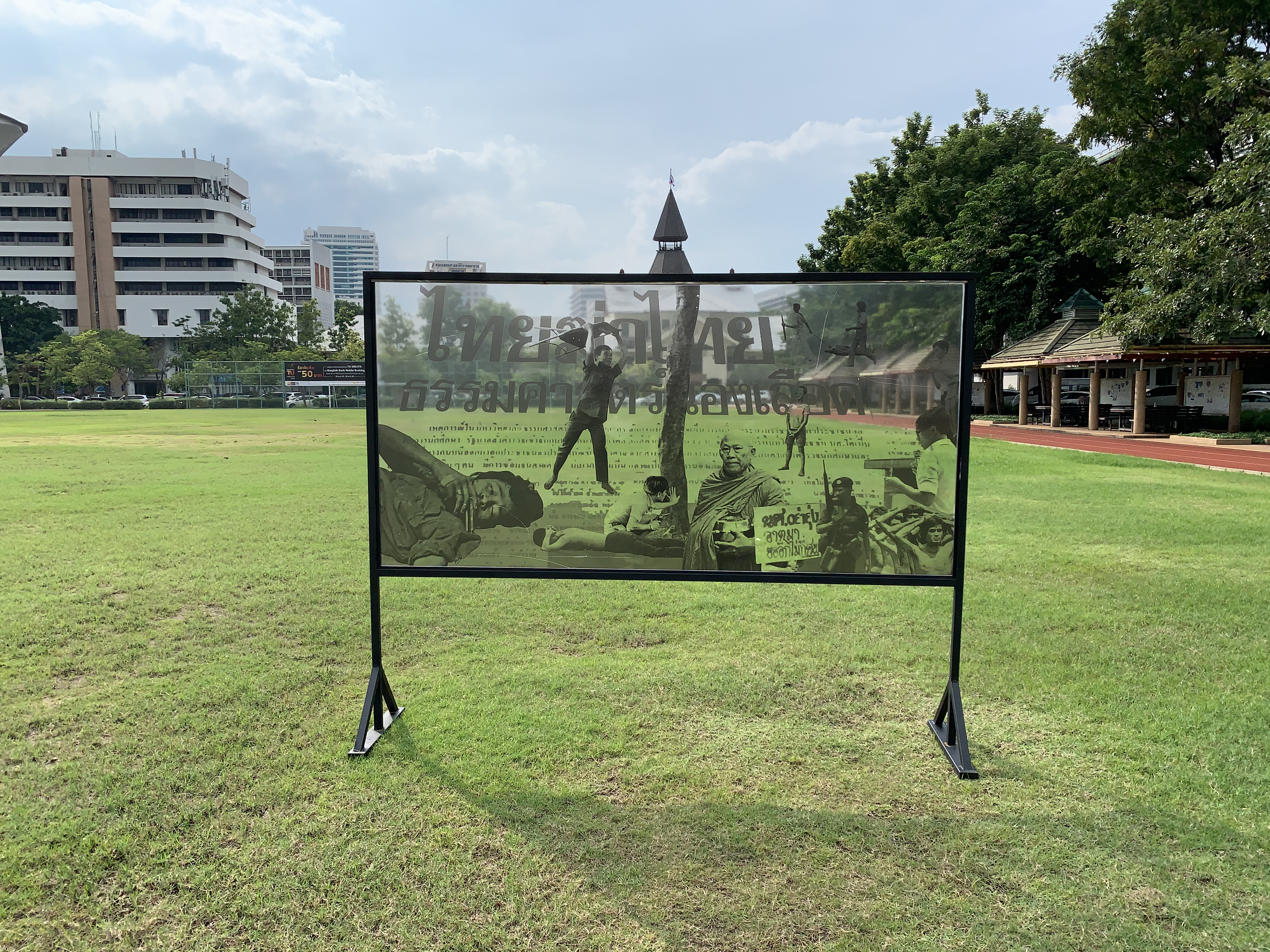
An exhibition of 6 October 1976 in Thammasat University reads "Thai kill[ed] Thai. Bloodshed [at] Thammasat."

The police and paramilitary forces blocked all exits from the university from dawn on 6 October, and, at 05:30, began shooting into the campus using war-grade weapons: assault rifles, machine guns, pistols, grenade launchers, armor-piercing recoilless rifles, scoped rifles, and anti-tank guns. The forces fired into the university grounds, later claiming that this was in response to sniper fire from inside the campus, but neutral observers on the spot reported hearing little if any shooting coming from the students. Prevented from leaving the campus or even evacuating the wounded, the student leaders offered surrender and negotiation with the Prime Minister, Seni Pramoj. It is unknown if the Prime Minister still held any real power that morning. The student representatives, including the actors accused of lèse majesté, turned themselves in, hoping for a chance to meet with the Prime Minister. However, they were arrested and taken into custody.

After a free-fire order was issued by the Bangkok police chief around 07:30–08:00, the campus was stormed with the police shooting and capturing university buildings. Some right-wing paramilitaries, working with the police, followed them into the university. Students trying to flee by diving into the Chao Phraya River were shot at by naval vessels. Some who were trying to flee the university via the front gate and the fence were lynched by the paramilitaries and bystanders. Witnesses (protesters and bystanders) reported that the paramilitaries assaulted, robbed, sexually abused, and shot the protesters, even some who had already surrendered. Some were hanged from trees and beaten, while others were set afire. Although the majority of victims were shot by the police, some were injured and even killed by the ensuing mob of people that took part in the chaos. The mob also desecrated many of the bodies. At 11:00, the police gathered the surrendered students in the football arena, where men and women were forced to lie on their stomach and undress to their underwear.

The official death toll was 45, including 5 perpetrators. The official records were autopsy reports. However, the unofficial death toll, given by the organization which handled the corpses, was more than 100.

Neal Ulevich's photograph was the best-known depiction of the event. Winner of the 1977 Pulitzer Prize for spot news, it illustrates the brutality and lynch-mob mentality surrounding the event, and has since become a symbol for the massacre, and has inspired numerous works of art.

== Immediate aftermath ==
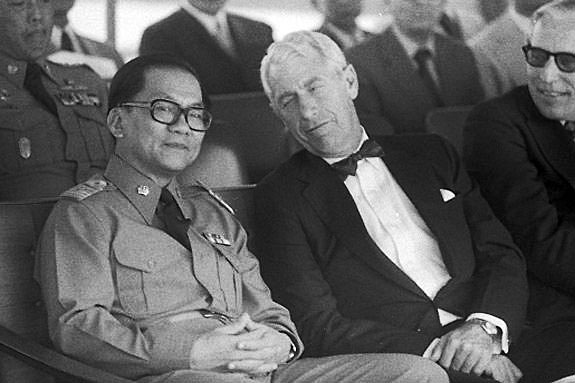
Prime Minister Thanin with US ambassador Charles S. Whitehouse in 1976

On the afternoon of 6 October after the massacre, the major factions of the military which formed the general staff agreed in principle to overthrow Seni, a plot that King Bhumibol was aware of and did not oppose, which ensured the success of the coup-makers. Later that evening, Admiral Sangad Chaloryu, the newly appointed supreme commander, announced that the military, under the name of the "National Administrative Reform Council" (NARC) had seized power to "prevent a Vietnamese-backed communist plot" and to preserve the "Thai monarchy forever". The king appointed a well-known anti-communist and royalist judge, Thanin Kraivichien, to lead a government that was composed of men loyal to the king. Thanin and his cabinet restored the repressive climate which had existed before 1973.

The Embassy of the United States in Bangkok, in a contemporary report to the Department of State, referred to the monarchy's "apparent approval" of the coup. The report mentions that student leaders were "neutralised" partly due to concerns about their involvement "in an insult to the royal family." The British ambassador reported that the monarchy had acquiesced to the military leaders of the coup, and may have approved of it.

=== The trial ===
After the massacre, none of the perpetrators were held accountable; however, 3,094 students and civilian survivors were detained. Many of the detainees were brutally abused by police. Most were released without charges except for 18 protest organizers, who were accused of rebelling against the state, causing public unrest, attempted murder of government officials and affiliating with communist acts. However, after pressures from within and outside the country, the last 18 detainees were eventually released two years after they were captured and given amnesty by Bhumibol. It has been speculated that the amnesty given to protestors was within the interest of the government and military, as its broad language implicitly shielded perpetrators of the massacre from any future prosecution and legally labeled the defendants as "wrongdoers", while quashing further public discussion of the trial or the massacre.

== Significance ==
=== Return of bureaucratic polity ===
For forty years from 1932, when the absolute monarchy was abolished, until 1973, when military rule was overthrown in favor of democracy, military officers and civil servants held sway in Thai politics and dominated the government, with King Bhumibol serving as the ceremonial head of state in accordance with his role as a constitutional monarch established by the 1932 constitution. The Thai political system was known as a "bureaucratic polity" which was dominated by the military and civilian bureaucrats. The massacre disproved the argument that the bureaucratic polity was on the retreat as the military came to play a central role once more in Thai politics, a situation that would continue throughout the 1970s and 1980s until the 1988 general election, when all seats were democratically elected, including that of the prime minister, who from 1976 to 1988 was appointed by the king.

=== Withdrawal symptoms ===
Benedict Anderson argues that the massacre and subsequent support for the return to dictatorship represented "withdrawal symptoms" by the middle class who favored stability and peace above democracy.

Following in the footsteps of previous military strongmen like Plaek Phibunsongkhram and Sarit Thanarat, Thanom became prime minister in 1963 following Sarit's death. He oversaw a massive influx of financial aid from anti-communist countries, such as the United States and Japan, fuelling the Thai economy, as well as increasing American cultural influence. But by the early 1970s, the US was withdrawing its troops from Indochina. In such a context, the Thai middle class and lower-middle class who had supported student efforts in 1973 to topple the Thanom regime were more a product of their immediate history than devotees of democracy. They lacked political experience and so had no real idea of the consequences of ending the dictatorship, which was simultaneously blamed both for failing to exact fuller commitments from its allies and for excessive subservience to Washington.

The support given by the Thai middle class and lower-middle class to the 1973 student protests was not an unconditional stamp of approval for democratic processes and the chaos that followed. As the economic boom turned into a slump following the 1973 oil crisis and a labor movement began to grow under the new liberal conditions, the "chaotic democracy" from 1973 to 1976 was seen as having threatened the economic interests of the middle class and lower-middle class. As a result, they turned their backs on democracy and welcomed the return to dictatorship on 6 October 1976, hence Anderson's use of the phrase "withdrawal symptoms".

== King Bhumibol's role ==
=== Overview ===
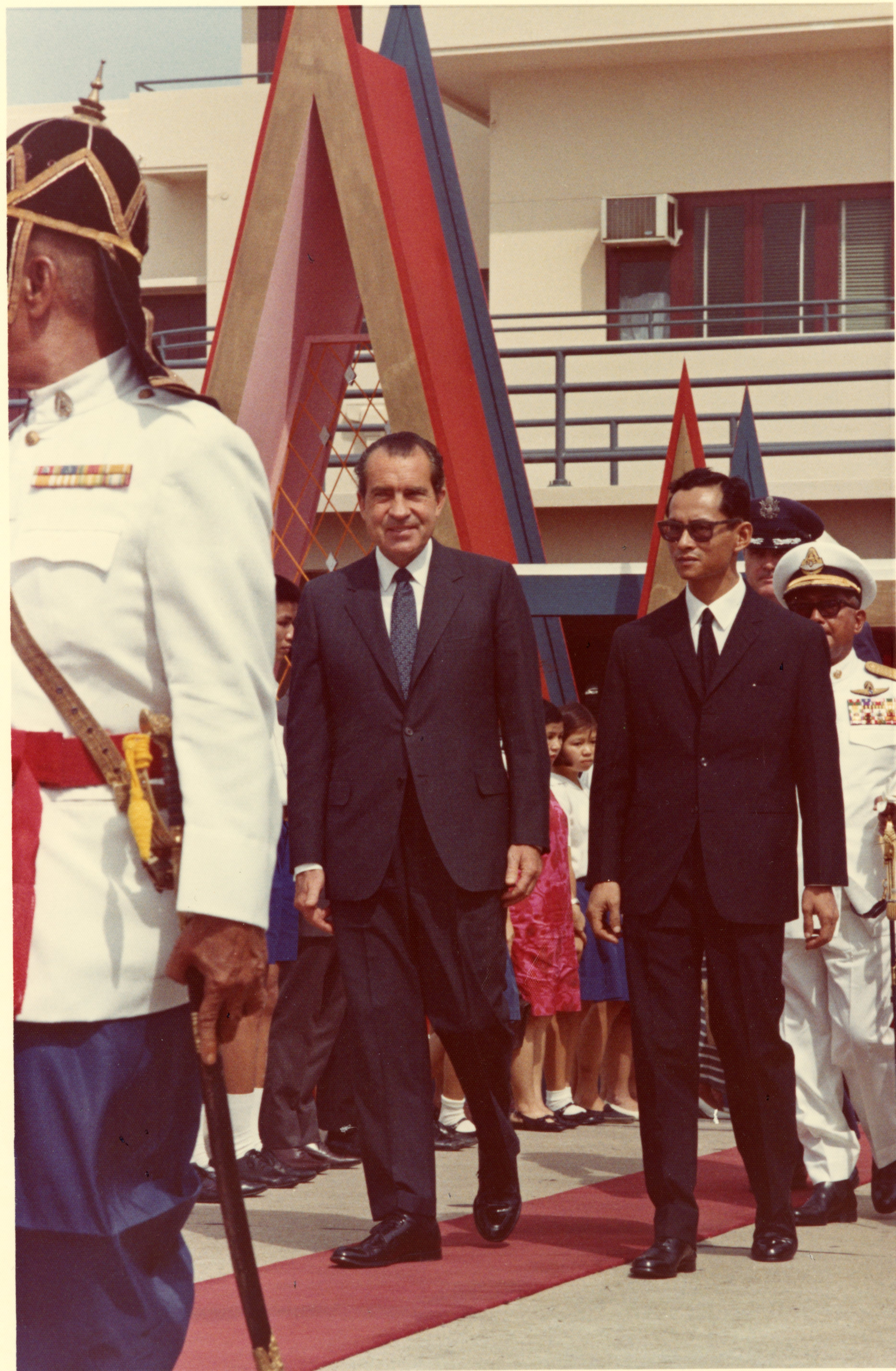
US President Richard Nixon and King Bhumibol Adulyadej during the Departure Ceremony for the U.S. Delegation in Bangkok, 1969.

King Bhumibol had supported student protesters in their demonstrations in 1973 that led to the downfall of the Thanom regime and resulted in the period of "chaotic democracy" from 1973-76. By 1976, he had turned against the students and, according to many scholars, played a crucial, if not the most important, role in bringing about the massacre and a return to military rule after a three-year flirtation with democracy. There were two reasons for this about-face. First, Thailand's neighbors either were facing communist insurgencies or had fallen to communist rule and become communist countries, while the US was withdrawing its military presence from the region. The pivotal year in the trajectory of the king's involvement in politics was 1975. South Vietnam fell to the communists and the Communist Party of Vietnam was able to unify the country under its rule and drive out the US.

In Cambodia, the communist Khmer Rouge captured Phnom Penh and began a reign of terror that would only end in 1979. The 1975 incident that arguably shook the Thai monarchy to the core was the overthrow by the Lao People's Revolutionary Party of the Lao Royal Family, to which the Thai monarchy traditionally had cultural and historical ties. Second, the period of chaotic democracy brought instability and chaos as demonstrations, strikes, and protests took place much more frequently. They threatened the economic interests of the monarchy managed by the Crown Property Bureau, which favored a stable and peaceful economic environment that would allow its businesses to thrive.

Bhumibol wielded his influence through a "network monarchy" that was centered on Privy Council President Prem Tinsulanonda. One of the main features of the network monarchy was that the monarch intervened actively in political developments, largely by working through proxies such as privy councillors and trusted military figures. This network monarchy suggests that, contrary to the popular belief that the king was a constitutional monarch and above politics, rather he had been intimately involved in Thai politics and had often intervened in order to secure his political and economic interests. The instability brought about by the student protesters until 1976 as well as the growing specter of communist threat in the region, especially after the "domino effect" where Vietnam, Cambodia and Laos fell in succession to the communists, convinced Bhumibol to see the protesters as a threat to his rule. The Thai state and its politicians subsequently branded these students, as well as workers and farmers, as "communists" and a "fifth column for the Communist Party of Thailand (CPT) and North Vietnam."

There was little evidence for the claim that protesters, including students protesting at Thammasat University, were communists. While the CPT had grown in strength, they were far from a unified force and they appealed to peasants by focusing on social injustices while avoiding attacking the monarchy and Buddhism. Their gains were fuelled more by the government's alienation of the peasantry. This suggests that the term "communists" was applied very liberally and indiscriminately and more often than not, deliberately, to those who were deemed to be the sources of instability that threatened the monarchy and the king. In the Thai state's view, communism was simply the enemy of the nation, religion (Buddhism) and monarchy, and a sworn enemy of "Thainess". One of the more persistent counterinsurgency strategies was to link socialists, communists, and the Left to external threats. In order to deal effectively with the "communist" threat that would undermine his rule and status, in addition to deploying governmental forces such as the Thai military and police, Bhumibol, through his network monarchy, also encouraged three paramilitary forces—the Village Scouts, Nawaphon, and Red Gaurs—to use violence against protesters from 1973 to 1976, culminating in the Thammasat massacre.

=== Village Scouts ===
The Village Scouts organization was a national paramilitary group sponsored by the King and Queen of Thailand since 1972 in order to promote national unity against threats to Thai independence and freedom, particularly against "communism". The movement was set up explicitly to protect the monarchy from communism. It focused on the central features of Thai identity: love of play, deep respect for the king and religion (Buddhism), and for ethnic Thai "specialness". The king was held to be central to the Thai nation, to be protected at all costs, alongside the nation and religion, forming the Thai nationalist shibboleth, "nation, religion, king". The Village Scouts presence provided continuous proof of militant political support for nation-religion-king beyond the Bangkok upper classes, among the "establishments" of provincial capitals, small towns, and villages. It helped to legitimize private, localized repression of protesting peasants and student activists as essential for the preservation the status quo.

During 1973 to 1976, Village Scout membership rose to tens of thousands, almost all in rural, CPT-influenced Thailand. After an Internal Security Operations Command (ISOC) takeover, the Village Scouts metamorphosed into a fascist-style mass political movement that would play a major role in the ensuing massacre.

=== Nawaphon ===
Killing Communists is not demeritorious

Killing communists is not killing persons because whoever destroys the nation, the religion, or the monarchy, such bestial types are not complete persons. Thus, we must intend not to kill people but to kill the Devil (Mara); this is the duty of all Thai [...] It is just like when we kill a fish to make a stew to place in the alms bowl for a monk. There is certainly demerit in killing the fish, but we place it in the alms bowl of a monk and gain much merit.

— Kittivudho Bhikkhu

Nawaphon was an ISOC operation organized in 1974. It was composed of mainly low-level government functionaries and clerks, rural village and communal headmen, as well as a number of monks. The name "Nawaphon" means "nine strengths", a reference to either the Chakri Ninth Reign (King Bhumibol) or the nine points of Nawaphon's program to preserve Thai nationalism.

The aim of Nawaphon was to protect the king from threats like communism. A key figure of the movement was the monk Kittivudho Bhikkhu, who became its leader in 1975. In a June 1976 interview, he was asked if killing leftists or communists would produce demerits or negative karma, he said that such killing would not be demeriting because, "...whoever destroys the nation, the religion or the monarchy, such bestial types are not complete persons". Although liberals complained about this call to murder, he received no sanctions from the Sangha for this speech, and the title of this speech soon became a slogan.

In 1967, he established Jittiphawan College. It was inaugurated by Bhumibol and Queen Sirikit who returned regularly even after Kittivudho began to make incendiary speeches about the need to deal with student protesters and communists.

Employing the slogan that "killing communists is not demeritorious", Kittivudho encouraged the killings of alleged communists from 1973 to 1976 and injected militant Buddhism into the Thai body politic, eventually inciting his followers to commit violence at Thammasat University on 6 October. Earlier, Nawaphon was responsible for the killing of more than 20 prominent farmer activists in 1975. The murders were an attempt to negate the farmers' new-found political agency and, by so doing, return them to their pre-October 1973 state of relative repression.

=== Red Gaurs ===
The Red Gaurs were ex-mercenaries and men discharged from the military for disciplinary infractions mixed with unemployed vocational school graduates, high-school dropouts, idle street corner boys and slum toughs. In the early-1970s, potential recruits were in dire economic straits, unable to obtain employment, and thus were easy targets of anti-student and anti-worker propaganda. Their grievances were exploited by the state, notably the king's network, and their anger directed towards student protesters. They were recruited not on the basis of ideological commitment, but rather by promises of high pay, abundant liquor, brothel privileges and the lure of public notoriety. Unlike the Village Scouts and the Nawaphon, the motivation of the Red Gaurs was more sociological than ideological.

=== Royal family involvement ===
Bhumibol and the royal family took part frequently in Village Scout activities and attended ceremonies at Kittivudho's college and Red Gaur training camps, thus illustrating their close ties with these three paramilitary forces. While all three forces differed in their nature, they were united by their allegiance to the king and, concomitantly, their hatred of communists. These paramilitary forces would subsequently be mobilized to attack the student protesters at Thammasat University to end their weeks-long protests.

== Remembrance ==
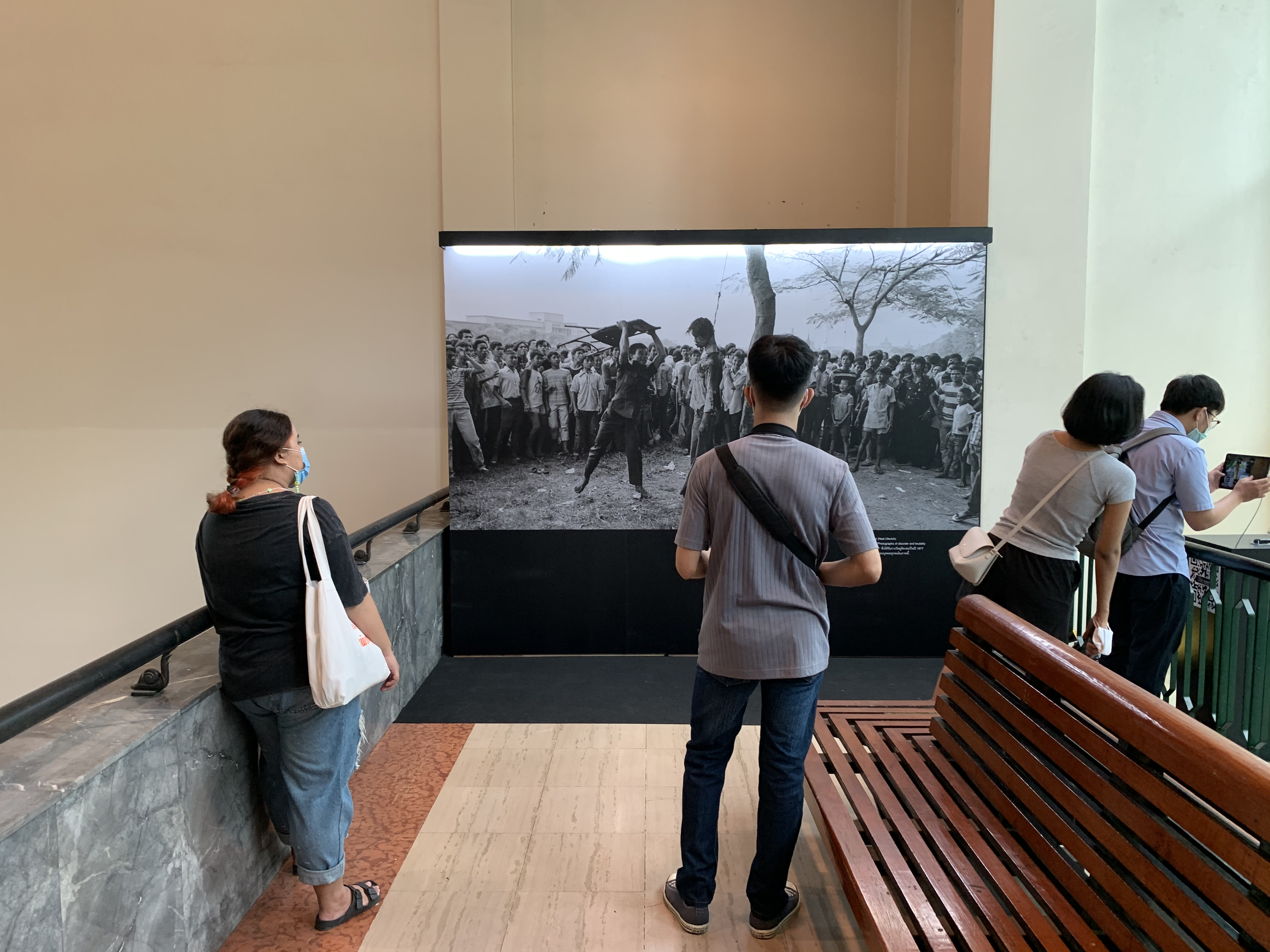
An enlarged picture of the beaten hanged man on display at a temporary exhibition on 6 Oct

External videos
- Former AP photographer Neal Ulevich reflects the event, AP

According to Ron Corben, the Thammasat University massacre continues to be a "...scar on the Thai collective psyche..." The government has remained silent over its role, and that of the king, in the killing of student protesters. This silence is deeply embedded in a culture of impunity. In an analysis of the two amnesty laws passed in relation to the massacre, Thailand scholar Tyrell Haberkorn argues that they first created and then consolidated impunity for the coup and the massacre that preceded it. The first amnesty law, passed on 24 December 1976, legalized the coup and prevented those who seized power on the evening of 6 October from being held accountable. The second amnesty law, passed on 16 September 1978, freed eighteen student activists still undergoing criminal prosecution and dismissed the charges against them. The "hidden transcripts" of the two amnesties for massacre and coup that followed reveal the careful, calculated legal moves taken to protect those who were behind them.

Despite the rhetoric in the streets and on the radio about the need to protect the nation, the coup and the massacre that preceded it unsettled some inside the state, perhaps because they were aware of the extra-legal status of the massacre, perhaps because they worried about their own culpability, and perhaps because they were aware that the violations in need of amnesty were not only those of the criminal code but of the more basic code of being human. Thus, both amnesty laws sought to produce impunity for state violence, particularly the king's involvement. There has been no state investigation into the violence and this impunity is both cause and effect of the silence, ambivalence, and ambiguity surrounding the event for both those who survived it and Thai society.

Historian Thongchai Winichakul, one of the student protesters who was jailed for his participation in the protests at Thammasat University, argues that the clearest evidence of the evasive public memories of the uprisings and massacre are the names the events have come to be known by, and the most conspicuous site of contested memories is the controversy over the memorial for the events. The massacre continues to be known in Thailand by the deliberately ambiguous term "6 October event". Thongchai argues that this non-committal name is loaded with many unsettled meanings, which imply the absence of any commitment and obscures the past because it is too heavily loaded with contesting voices, placing the massacre on the edge between recognizability and anonymity, between history and the silenced past, and between memory and forgetfulness. Thus, in "remembering" it, its nomenclature carries overt political significance that continues to reverberate in present-day Thai politics, particularly in relation to the role played by the state and King Bhumibol in the attack on student protesters.

A commemoration event in 1996 represented a significant break in the silence, but despite the events twenty years earlier being retold innumerable times, there was no reference to the "undiscussable" parts of that history. There was no reaction, not even any comment, from the military or any conservative organization. More importantly, the denunciation of state crime avoided imputing blame to any specific individual and the victims' self-sacrifice for society's sake was honored. The role played by King Bhumibol in inciting the military and police and paramilitary forces to attack the student protesters was not mentioned so as not to target the king as an "individual". Yet, this could also be interpreted as an attempt by the state to whitewash history by wishing away parts that it did not want the public to know or remember. In addition, by emphasizing the theme of healing and reconciliation in the remembrance, the Thai state, and by implication the king, have sought to make clear that the commemoration had no interest in and would not be involved in any talk of retribution. Forty years later, the perpetrators remain unnamed and unpunished. Tyrell Haberkorn, a Thailand scholar, speculates that the death of Bhumibol may have made it even more difficult to name the perpetrators as Rama IX's reign becomes more idealized.

=== Doct6.com ===
Former student activists and academics had set up an online archive on the massacre, aimed to raise awareness of the tragedy to the public. The project is managed by Puangthong Pawakapan, a professor at Chulalongkorn University. The archive is set up to fight against authorities' attempts to erase the tragedy from most history books. The archive can be accessed on Doct6.com, where sources and articles are chronicled, digitized, and uploaded for public access. The site presents a multitude of sources from photographs, newspaper clippings, and oral testimonies to the death certificates of those that were murdered due to the protest.

Puangthong Pawakapan suggested the five perpetrators should be separated from the death toll.

=== Commemoration events ===
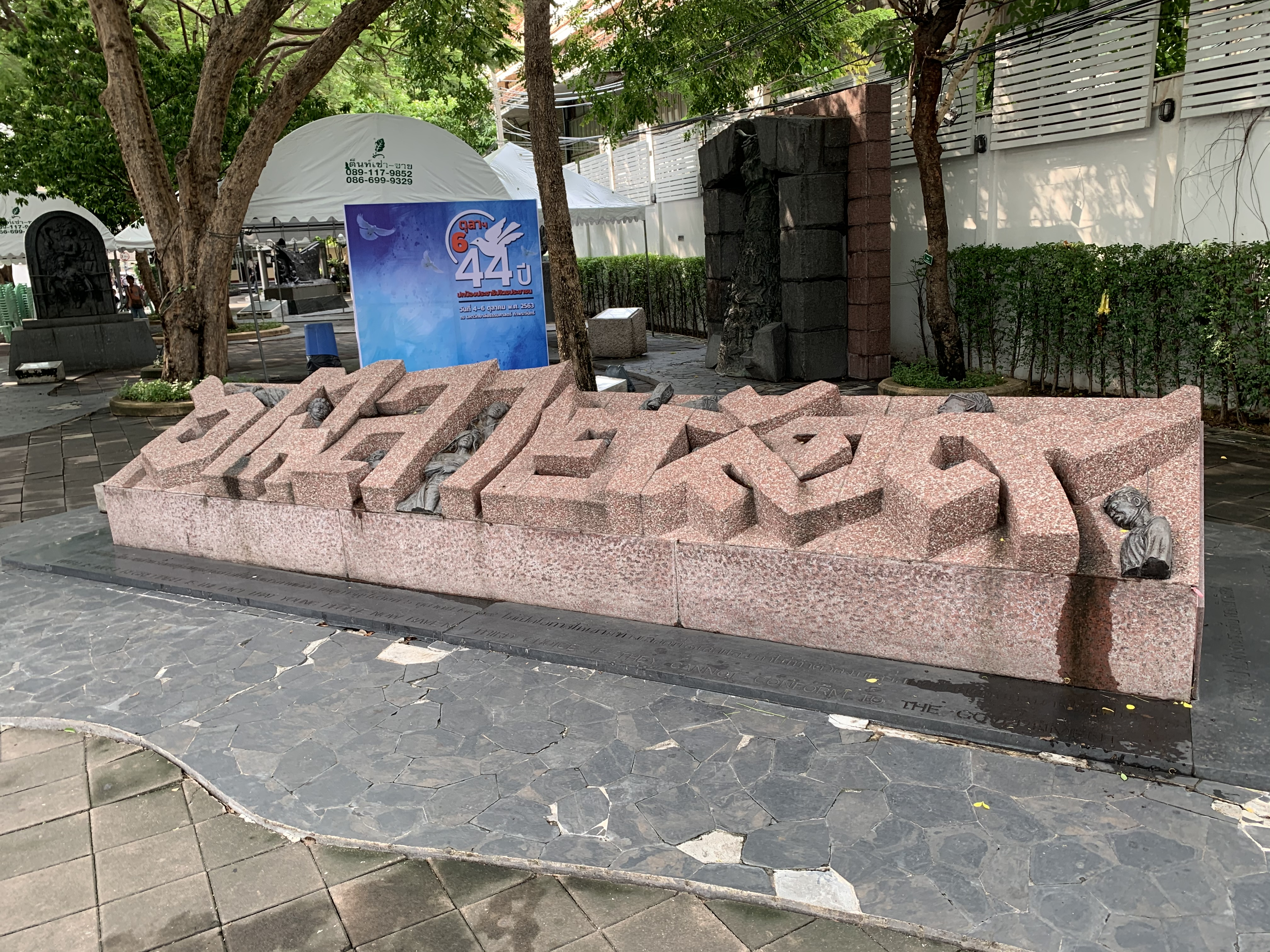
The memorial in Thammasat University

Thammasat University has been known to host annual commemoration events of the massacre, presenting lectures by historians, interviews with survivors as well as round table discussions, short films and live performances.

In 2019, the Jarupong Thongsin for Democracy Award, an award created by the student council of Thammasat University to recognize activists fighting for democracy was given for the first time. The award is named after Jarupong Thongsin, a student leader who was among the victims of the massacre.

=== Films ===
==== Respectfully Yours ====
Respectfully Yours is a film directed by Pattaraphon Phoothong and producer Puangthong Pawakapan. The film was first screened in October 2016 at the 40th anniversary commemoration event of Thammasat Massacre. The documentary features interviews of the relatives of those who died in the massacre. Puangthong explained at a screening that this was an attempt to highlight the faces of the victims, to not "treat them like numbers".

==== Song Phi Nong ====
A short film called Song Phi Nong (The Two Brothers, สองพี่น้อง) presents the stories of the two activists whose lynching was portrayed in the student play that incited the massacre. It was made by the same team that created Respectfully Yours and is available for viewing on the Documentation of Oct 6 Facebook page. The film is told through an interview with the two men's brothers, a biography that has national implications. The film shows that of the two men, Choomporn has a strong political commitment. He and Vichai borrowed their friend's motorcycle and went out to put posters to protest the return of General Thanom, who was exiled three years earlier after the student uprising of 14 October 1973. The documentary also shows the location of the lynching, a gate located in Nakhon Pathom. The gate is called "the red gate" and stood in the middle of an empty real-estate plot. The current owner did not bother to remove the gates after the lynching as he did not want to waste money, indirectly preserving important historical evidence.

==== By the Time It Gets Dark ====
The winner of the 2016 Suphannahong National Film Awards for Best Picture, By the Time It Gets Dark does not tell the story of the massacre per se, but rather utilizes an indirect approach to understanding a national trauma by someone who does not have a direct connection to the events that took place.

== See also ==
- 1922 Turin massacre, Turin, Northern Italy, Kingdom of Italy (now Italy)
- 2020–2021 Thai protests
- February 28 incident, similar event in Taiwan (1947)
- Gwangju Uprising, similar event in South Korea (1980)
- Kent State shootings, a similar event in the United States (1970)
- Red Drum killings, extrajudicial killings in Thailand in 1972
- Trisakti shootings, a similar event in Indonesia (1998)
