= Village Scouts =

Thai social movement

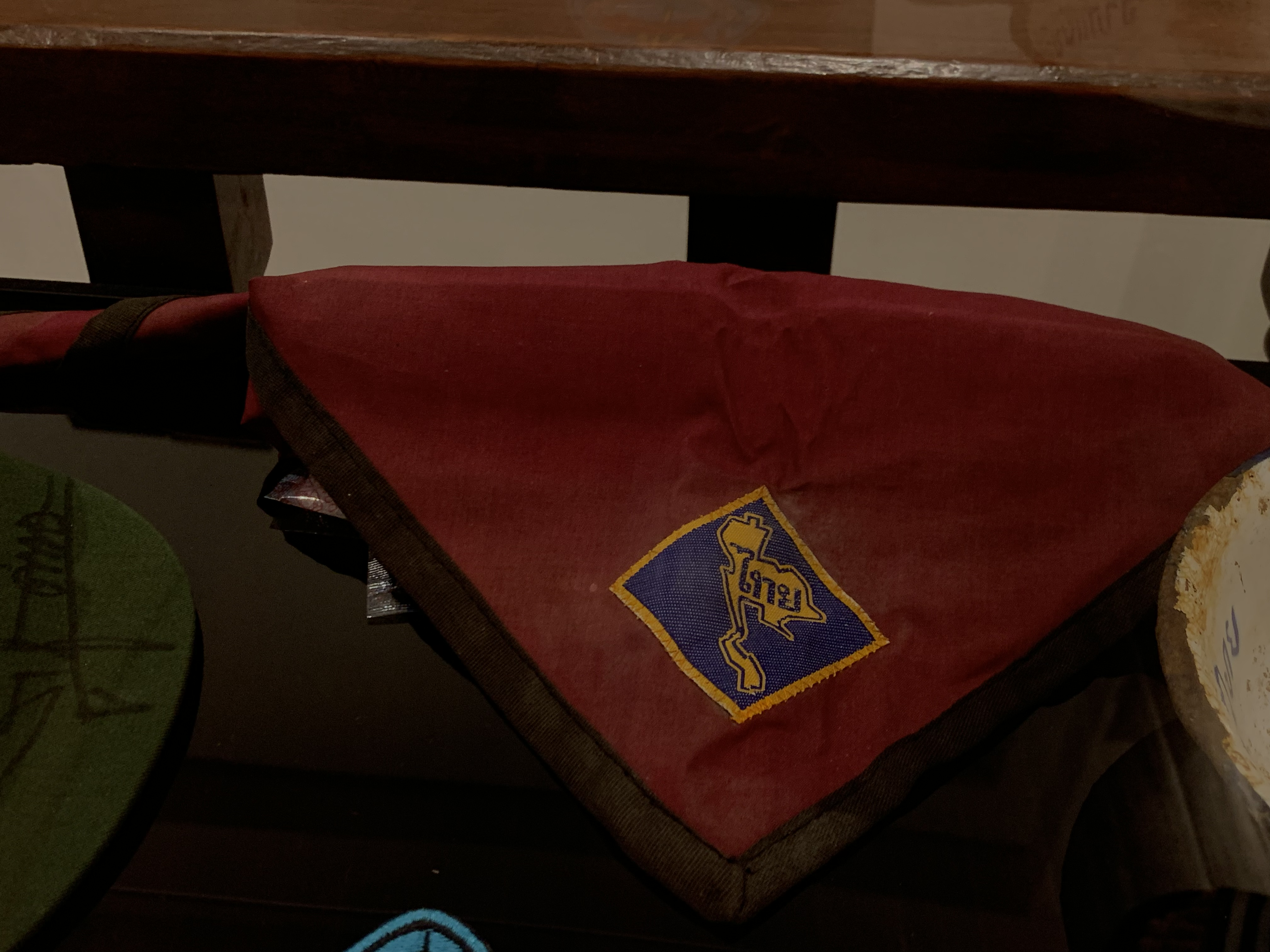
An original neckerchief of a village scout, dated prior to the Thammasat University Massacre

Village Scouts (Thai: ลูกเสือชาวบ้าน, RTGS: Luk Suea Chao Ban) is the common name of a right-wing, ultranationalist social movement and paramilitary militia of volunteers from rural Thailand. It is a countrywide organization that the King and Queen of Thailand have sponsored since 1972 in order to promote national unity. It was first founded by the Thai Border Patrol Police (BPP) under the aegis of the Ministry of Interior.

== 20th century Village Scouts ==
The Village Scouts were mustered from 1971 on to fight the communist insurgency and the pro-democracy movement in Thailand as well as the progressive Farmers' Federation of Thailand. They were modeled on the "grass roots" defense organizations in South Vietnam. At their core were rich and independent farmers. The Village Scouts were organized in small cells, usually commanded by an urban right-wing politician. They were taught to oppose "radical elements", and to defend Thailand's symbolic trinity of nation-religion-monarchy. Directly controlled by the Ministry of Interior and sponsored by rich royalists in the cities, the Village Scouts' supreme patron was King Bhumibol Adulyadej. The king and the royal family visited Village Scout units to bless their scarves and flags. The Village Scouts would act as "ears and eyes" of the government and report strangers entering their villages to local officials. A short time after the establishment of the Village Scouts, over five million Thais, or 10 percent of the population, had completed the organization's five-day training course. From 1971 to 1985, more than ten million adult Thais had gone through Village Scout training, with around two million people attending recruitment sessions in 1976 alone.

The Village Scouts were deployed to counter the protests of the pro-democracy and students movement. They were called via radio to occupy strategic points in all major towns during the protests against US bases in the country and against the return of ousted military dictators Thanom Kittikachorn and Praphas Charusathien. The probably best-known, and most impactful, mission of the Village Scouts was during the anti-leftist rally that led to the Thammasat University massacre on 6 October 1976, in which at least 46 people were killed and led to the subsequent coup d'état and return to military rule.

The organisation increasingly appealed to urban, right-wing conservatives, gradually moving away from its poor, rural base. By 1976, the Village Scouts were a primarily urban movement funded by middle and upper-class Thais, and "increasingly took on a fascist character".

The movement fizzled out during the 1980s.

== 21st century Village Scouts ==
The Village Scouts re-emerged as an ultranationalist mass organization after the turn of the millennium against the backdrop of the Muslim separatist conflict in the three southernmost provinces.

== See also ==
- Cyber Scouts (Thailand)
- Red Gaurs
- Nawaphon
- Rubbish Collection Organization
- Thai Rangers
