= Red Gaurs =

Thai right-wing paramilitary organization

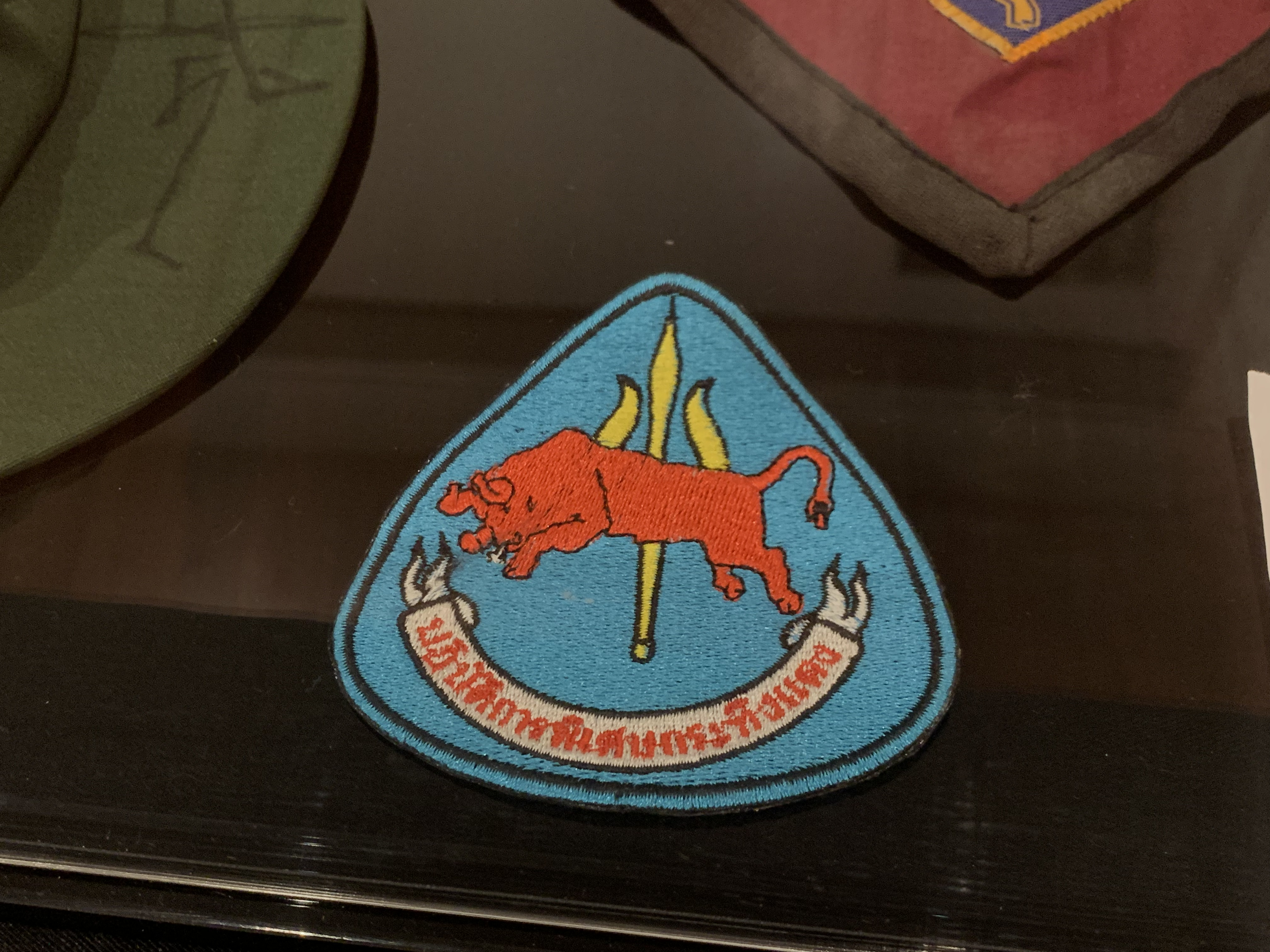
An arm patch of the Red Gaurs (unknown year, a remake after the Thammasat University Massacre)

The Red Gaurs (Thai: กระทิงแดง, Krathing Daeng) were an extreme right-wing paramilitary organization active in Thailand during the 1970s. The Red Gaurs played a key role in the 6 October 1976 massacre of students and activists at Thammasat University. The organization derives its name from the gaur (/ɡaʊər/, Bos gaurus), also called the Indian bison, the largest extant bovine. The gaur is native to the Indian subcontinent and Southeast Asia.

== Establishment and activities ==
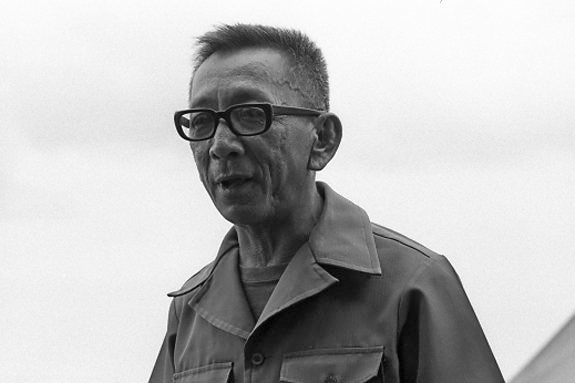
Sudsai Hasdin, purported initiator of the Red Gaurs (1974)

It was set up by the Internal Security Operations Command (ISOC) of the Thai military to counter the country's students movement after the democratic revolution of October 1973. Major-General Sudsai Hasadin has been reported being its main organizer. From mid-1974 on, the paramilitary organization's units were publicly armed with firearms and grenades. Afterwards, they enjoyed practical immunity to criminal prosecution, or even warnings from police or army staff. The Red Gaurs violently attacked demonstrators at the protests against individual articles of the 1974 constitution, against U.S. military bases in Thailand, and at the protests against the return of deposed military dictators Thanom Kittikachorn and Praphas Charusathien.

In August 1975, the group assaulted the Thammasat University, trying to burn down the school building. Assassinations of labor and peasants union officials (namely of the Peasants Federation of Thailand), as well as progressive politicians, and grenade attacks on crowds have been attributed to the Red Gaurs. The organization's militants often attacked and injured photojournalists who tried to take pictures of them and their guns. The Red Gaurs interfered in the campaign for the 1976 parliamentary election by harassing candidates and attacking political parties they perceived as "leftist" (in particular the New Force Party). Besides, the Red Gaurs were also employed to guard road construction crews against attacks in areas with communist insurgents.

== Membership and support ==
The ultra-royalist vigilante group focused its activities on Bangkok. Its membership consisted mainly of discontent young unemployed, vocational school students and high school drop-outs. The majority of their key cadres however, were veterans of the Vietnam War or former mercenaries in Laos, and former army soldiers dismissed for disciplinary infractions. The Krathing Daeng militants were well paid, provided with free liquor, taken on drinking sprees, and to brothels paid for with public funds.

They were heavily funded and backed by the United States government. The US provided at least 250 million baht to help organize the Red Gaurs. Paul M. Handley, the author of The King Never Smiles, an unofficial biography of King Bhumibol Adulyadej, reports that the king also gave support to both the Red Gaurs and the "Village Scouts", another patriotic anti-leftist paramilitary organization.

== See also ==
- Nawaphon
- Rubbish Collection Organization
- Village Scouts
