= Nawaphon =

Thai right-wing organization active in mid-1970s

The Nawaphon organization (Thai: ขบวนการนวพล, alternatively transcribed as Navapol, Nawapol, Nawaphol, translated variously as 'new force', 'ninth force',) or 'nine new forces' was a Thai extreme right-wing, patriotic, Buddhist and anti-communist propaganda organization active during the country's short democratic period in the mid-1970s. Nawaphon has been described as a psychological warfare unit. Its mission: to support the Red Gaurs and propagandize the Thai population.

Nawaphon was set up by Wattana Keovimol in 1974. Wattana had been the head of the Thai Students Association in the United States, when he studied at Seton Hall University. Nawaphon was supported by the Internal Security Operations Command (ISOC) of the Thai military and the Ministry of Interior. The group was said to have links to wealthy businessmen, politicians, the National Security Council, and Thai military intelligence. Nawaphon rallied merchants, businessmen, and monks who were opposed to social change and democracy, fearing for their wealth. The organization attracted a number of Buddhist monks, the most prominent being Kittiwuttho Bhikkhu, who infamously said that killing communists was not a sin.

The movement was opposed to parliamentary democracy and campaigned for the three principles of nation, religion, and monarchy. Nawaphon attracted considerable support due to the common feeling that these national principles were threatened by left-wing forces. In 1976, the group was thought to have 30,000–50,000 members. Nawaphon played a key role in the anti-leftist agitation that led to the Thammasat University massacre on 6 October 1976, in which members of the organization were involved.

After the coup re-establishing the military rule following the massacre, Nawaphon's popularity diminished due to suspicions that it had become a means of catering to the ambitions of the military clique.

An alternative view on Nawaphon's membership has been given by historian Thongchai Winichakul, who pointed out that unlike the Red Gaurs and the Village Scouts, the other right-wing groups involved in the massacre, information on Nawaphon is scarce and much of it seems to derive from boasts made by Wattana. In addition, photos of large gatherings attributed to the group came from mixed crowds, not allowing different right-wing groups to be distinguished. Thongchai therefore suggested that Nawaphon may have been "a phantom organization intended to inflate the image of the right-wing movement" that had no base of its own but took credit for counterinsurgency operations by the ISOC.

== See also ==
- Buddhism and violence
- Red Gaurs
- Rubbish Collection Organization
- Village Scouts
