= Thongchai Winichakul =

Thai historian

Thongchai Winichakul ธงชัย วินิจจะกูล
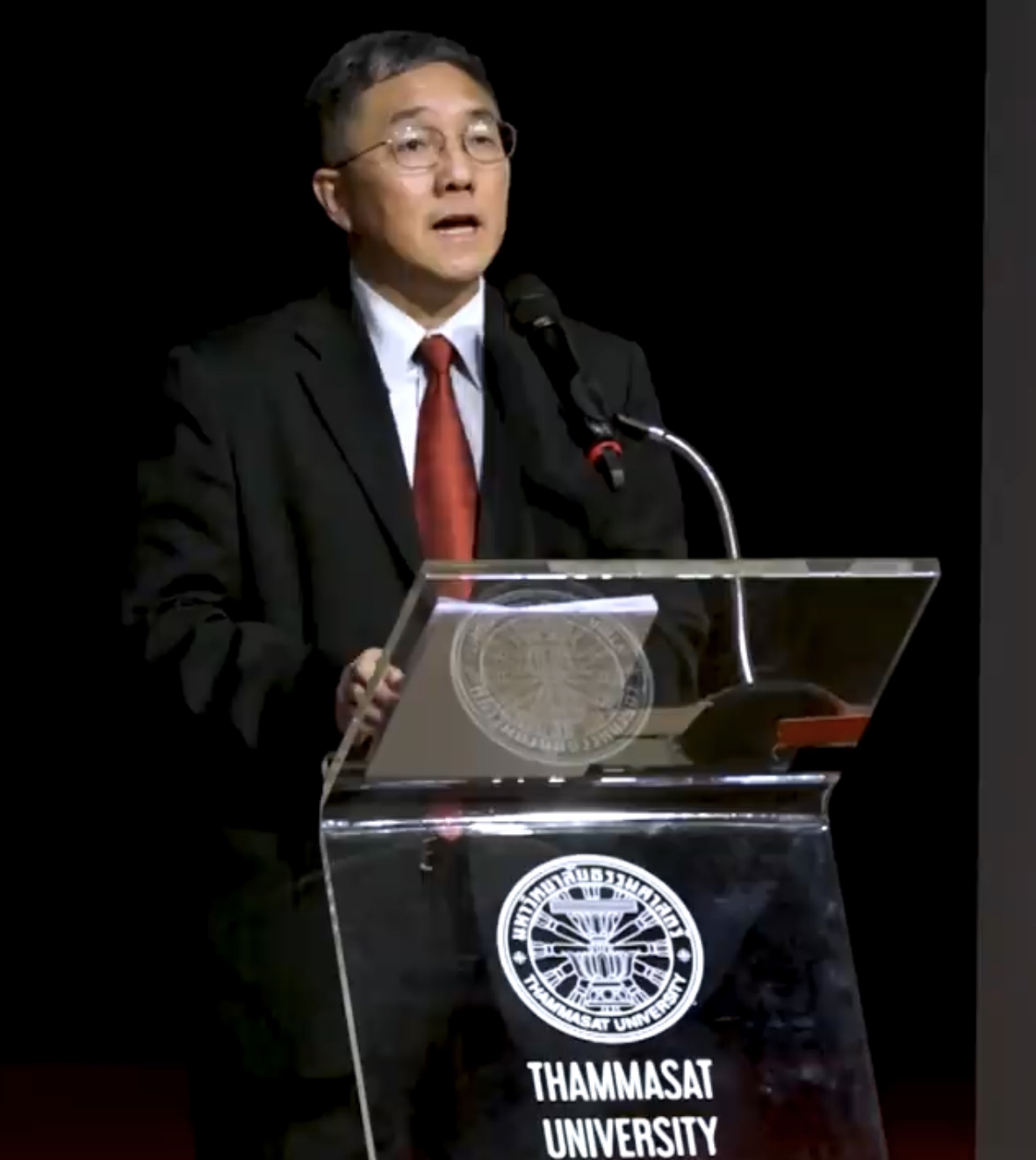
- Winichakul in 2020
- Born: October 1, 1957 (age 69); Bangkok, Thailand

Academic background
- Education: Thammasat University (B.A.); University of Sydney (M.A., Ph.D.)

Academic work
- Discipline: Historian
- Institutions: University of Wisconsin–Madison
- Notable works: Siam Mapped: A History of the Geo-Body of a Nation (1994) Moments of Silence: The Unforgetting of the October 6, 1976, Massacre in Bangkok (2020)

Thongchai Winichakul (Thai: ธงชัย วินิจจะกูล; RTGS: Thongchai Winitchakun, pronounced [tʰōŋ.tɕʰāj wí.nít.tɕà.kūːn]; born 1957), is a Thai historian and researcher of Southeast Asian studies. He is professor emeritus of Southeast Asian history at the University of Wisconsin–Madison and a chief senior researcher at the Japanese Institute of Developing Economies. He was the president for the Association for Asian Studies in 2013. He has had a major impact on the concept of Thai nationalism.

== Political activity ==
Thongchai is of Sino-Thai descent, was born and grew up in Bangkok. He was a student organizer and political activist while still in high school. He became even more involved in pro-democracy movements while in his first two years as an undergraduate at Thammasat University in Bangkok. Student and labor organizing had blossomed during and after the popular uprising of 14 October 1973.

But following the return of disempowered military dictator Thanom Kittikachorn and the resignation of Prime Minister Seni Pramoj, Thongchai and other student leaders organized a fresh wave of protests centered at Thammasat University. These culminated in a large rally that grew through the night of 5 October 1976. The next morning, 6 October, the Thai military and right-wing paramilitaries surrounded the Thammasat campus and attacked the students in the Thammasat University massacre. At least 46 people were killed, some even being raped, hung, or burned to death. Many students escaped. Thousands of students were arrested, though 19 of the demonstration's "ringleaders" were eventually imprisoned, including Thongchai. Various organizations, including Amnesty International, advocated for his release as a prisoner of conscience. He and his co-defendants were released by a royal amnesty on 16 September 1978, and allowed to return to finish their education at Thammasat on the condition that they were not to be involved in further political activities. He later went to Sydney, Australia, for his graduate education.

== Academic career ==
Thongchai completed his Bachelor of Arts degree with first class honors from Thammasat University in 1981. He received his master's degree with honors from University of Sydney in 1984. In 1988, he was conferred his doctoral degree from the same university. Subsequently, he returned to Bangkok to lecture at Thammasat University until 1991.

He was then appointed assistant professor at the University of Wisconsin. He remained in Madison, being promoted to associate professor in 1995, and full professor in 2001. He was assigned to both the Department of History and the Center for Southeast Asian Studies. Among other positions, he served as director of the Center for Southeast Asian Studies from 1997 to 1999, and director of graduate studies of the Department of History from 2008. He retired as professor emeritus in 2016.

Since 1991, he has been a member of the Association for Asian Studies (AAS), chairing its Southeast Asia Council and serving on its executive board in 1996–1997. In 2012, he was vice president of the AAS, and in 2013, president. In 1994, he was awarded a Guggenheim Fellowship. Thongchai was named to the American Academy of Arts and Sciences in 2003. He was a principal research fellow at the Asia Research Institute, National University of Singapore from 2010 to 2012. From 2017 to 2019, he was a chief senior researcher at the Inter-disciplinary Studies Center of the Institute of Developing Economies (IDE) in Chiba, Japan. Since 2020, he has been a visiting professor at the Pridi Banomyong International College of Thammasat University.

== Research ==
Thongchai's best-known academic work is his book Siam Mapped, published in 1994, which critiqued existing theories of Thai historiography. In its Japanese translation, the book won the Grand Prize of the 16th Asian Pacific Awards from the Asian Affairs Research Council. According to the Sojourn journal, it is one of the "most influential books of Southeast Asian Studies".

Thongchai's book Moments of Silence: The Unforgetting of the October 6, 1976, Massacre in Bangkok was awarded the 2022 EuroSEAS Humanities Book Prize. With the book, which he described as an intensely personal project, he aimed to break the perceived silence surrounding the October 6 Massacre of students in Bangkok, including his personal experiences of it.

== Selected works ==
- Moments of Silence: The Unforgetting of the October 6, 1976, Massacre in Bangkok. Honolulu: University of Hawaiʻi Press, 2020. (Winner of the 2022 EuroSEAS Humanities Book Prize)
- Siam Mapped: A History of the Geo-Body of a Nation. Honolulu: University of Hawaiʻi Press, 1994. (Winner of the 1995 Harry J. Benda Prize in Southeast Asian Studies)
- "The Quest for 'Siwilai': A geographical discourse of Civilizational Thinking in the Late 19th and early 20th Century Siam", Journal of Asian Studies 59, 3 (August 2000): pages 528–549.
- "The Others Within: Travel and Ethno-spatial Differentiation of Siamese Subjects, 1885–1910", lead article in Civility and Savagery: Social Identity in Tai States, ed. Andrew Turton, London: Curzon Press, 2000: pages 38–62.
- "Remembering/ Silencing the Traumatic Past: the Ambivalent Memories of the October 1976 Massacre in Bangkok" in Cultural Crisis and Social Memory: Modernity and Identity in Thailand and Laos, ed. Charles F Keyes and Shigeharu Tanabe, London and New York: Routledge/Curzon, 2002: pages 243–283.
- "Writing at the Interstices: Southeast Asian Historians and Post-National Histories in Southeast Asia", leading article in New Terrains in Southeast Asian History, ed. Abu Talib Ahmad and Tan Liok Ee, Athens: Ohio University Press, 2002: pages 3–29.
