= Thai Rangers =

Thai Rangers can mean either of the following:

- Thahan Phran - (ทหารพราน; literally "hunter soldiers"; AKA Thai Rangers), a paramilitary border and internal security force,
- Royal Thai Army Ranger - light infantry and special operations battalion
