= Chakthip Chaijinda =

Thai police general

Police General Chakthip Chaijinda
- จักรทิพย์ ชัยจินดา
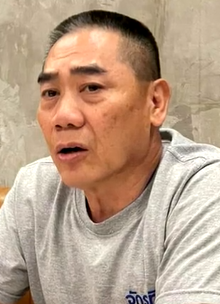

Member of the Senate of Thailand
- Ex officio 11 May 2019 – 30 September 2020
- Succeeded by: Suwat Jangyodsuk

11th Commissioner-General of the Royal Thai Police
- In office 1 October 2015 – 30 September 2020
- Preceded by: Somyot Poompanmoung
- Succeeded by: Suwat Jangyodsuk

Personal details
- Born: 19 October 1959 (age 66) Chonburi, Thailand
- Spouse: Busba Chaijinda
- Children: Chanant Chaijinda; Chaitad Chaijinda
- Education: Vajiravudh College; Royal Thai Police Cadet Academy; FBI Academy
- Profession: Policeman, politician
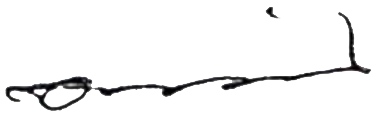
- Signature

Chakthip Chaijinda (Thai: จักรทิพย์ ชัยจินดา; born 19 October 1959) is a Thai police officer, serving as the 11th Commissioner-General of the Royal Thai Police from 2015 to 2020.

== Educations ==
Chakthip graduated from Vajiravudh College, and then he graduated from Armed Forces Academies Preparatory School in Class 20, same class with current King Vajiralongkorn man, Apirat Kongsompong. After graduated from AFAPS he studied at the Royal Thai Police Cadet Academy and an additional investigation course in international post-blast investigations at the International Law Enforcement Academy of Bangkok (ATF-ILEA), and then took courses at the FBI Academy in Quantico, Virginia. He passed the Counter Assault Team course of the United States Secret Service. He attended the anti-terror course of the Naresuan 261 Counter-Terrorism Unit and Arintharat 26.

== Career ==
Following the military coup of 22 May 2014, Chakthip was appointed to the National Legislative Assembly (NLA).

The National Police Policy Committee, on 14 August 2015, promoted Chakthip to be the eleventh Commissioner-General of the Royal Thai Police, replacing Pol. Gen. Somyot Poompanmoung who retired on 30 September 2015.

In the Nakhon Ratchasima shootings of February 2020, Chakthip led the SWAT team.

Chakthip was retired on 30 September 2020, making him one of the longest-serving Royal Thai Police Commissioners-General. Chakthip was succeeded by Suwat Jangyodsuk in 2020.

== Personal life ==
Chaktip, together with his spouse, declared assets of 865 million baht in his 2014 asset declaration.

== Awards ==
- The Most Exalted Order of the White Elephant

Police appointments
Preceded by Somyot Poompanmoung	Commissioner-General of the Royal Thai Police; 2015–2020	Succeeded by Suwat Jangyodsuk
Preceded by Santhan Chayanon	Commissioner of Metropolitan Police Bureau; 2010–2011	Succeeded by Winai Thongsong
