= Thitisan Utthanaphon =

Former Thai police officer (died 2025)

- ธิติสรรค์ อุทธนผล
- Died: 7 March 2025; Klong Prem Central Prison, Bangkok, Thailand

Thitisan Utthanaphon (Thai: ธิติสรรค์ อุทธนผล; RTGS: Thitisan Utthanaphon; died 7 March 2025), also known as Jo Ferrari, was a former Thai police officer who tortured a suspect to death in August 2021. He previously served as Superintendent of the Muang Nakhon Sawan Provincial Police Station until his firing.

== Murder of Jirapong Thanapat ==
On 5 August 2021, Thitisan along with five subordinates tortured Jirapong Thanapat—a male narcotics suspect—to death by putting a black plastic bag over his head. On 21 August 2021, Thitisan was fired by Police General Suwat Jangyodsuk, then-Commissioner-General of the Royal Thai Police. On 26 August, he was arrested.

On 8 June 2022, Thitisan was convicted of murder by torture and sentenced to death, which was reduced to a life sentence.

== Death ==
On 7 March 2025, Thitisan was found hanged in his cell at Klong Prem Central Prison in Bangkok. His death was ruled to be a suicide following an autopsy.
