= Kitrat Panphet =

Thai police officer (born 1965)

Police General Kitrat Panphet
- กิตติ์รัฐ พันธุ์เพ็ชร์

15th Commissioner-General of the Royal Thai Police
- In office 9 October 2024 – 30 September 2026
- Preceded by: Torsak Sukvimol
- Succeeded by: Samran Nualma

Personal details
- Born: December 8, 1965 (age 60) Ratchaburi Province, Thailand

Kitrat Panphet (Thai: กิตติ์รัฐ พันธุ์เพ็ชร์) is a Thai police officer, currently serving as the 15th commissioner-general of the Royal Thai Police since 2024. Kitrat previously served as acting commissioner general since 1 October 2024 following the retirement of police general Torsak Sukvimol. Kitrat is due to retire in September 2026.

== 2024 Lam Luk Ka bus crash ==
Kitrat is overseeing the investigation into possible negligence on the part of the driver and bus company involved in the 1 October 2024 bus crash that killed 23.

== Tak Bai massacre trial ==
In October 2024, Kitrat launched a search for the 14 suspects of the 25 October 2004 Tak Bai massacre, which killed 85 people, before the statute of limitations expires on 25 October.
