= Damrongsak Kittiprapas =

Thai police officer

Police General Damrongsak Kittiprapas
- ดำรงศักดิ์ กิตติประภัสร์

13th Commissioner-General of the Royal Thai Police
- In office 1 October 2022 – 30 September 2023
- Preceded by: Suwat Jangyodsuk
- Succeeded by: Torsak Sukvimol

Damrongsak Kittiprapas (Thai: ดำรงศักดิ์ กิตติประภัสร์) is a Thai police officer who served as the 13th commissioner-general of the Royal Thai Police from 2022 to 2023.

== Career ==
Damrongsak earned his MPA in the United States and served in multiple police positions across Bangkok and Northeastern Thailand.

He retired on 30 September 2023 and was succeeded by Torsak Sukvimol.
