= Special Branch Bureau =

Special Branch Bureau กองบัญชาการตำรวจสันติบาล
- Official Seal
- Abbreviation: SBB

Agency overview
- Formed: 17 November 1932

Jurisdictional structure
- National agency: Thailand
- Operations jurisdiction: Thailand
- General nature: Local civilian police

Operational structure
- Headquarters: Royal Thai Police Headquarters, Pathum Wan, Bangkok, Thailand
- Agency executive: Police Lt.Gen. Apichart Petchprasit, Commissioner
- Parent agency: Royal Thai Police

Website
- http://www.sbpolice.go.th/

The Special Branch Bureau or SBB (Thai: กองบัญชาการตำรวจสันติบาล) is a law enforcement agency under the Royal Thai Police (RTP) responsible for clandestine and covert operations, countering hybrid transnational organized crime (TOC) threats, counterintelligence within the scope of police authority, intelligence collection and assessment of national security threats within police jurisdiction, intelligence-led counterterrorism, intelligence-led tactical executive protection, and the safeguarding of classified police intelligence assets. It is under the Crime Prevention and Suppression Support Group.

The SBB is primarily tasked with ensuring the security of the King, the Queen, and members of the Thai Royal Family, while conducting police counterintelligence and intelligence collection operations against actors or entities posing a threat to national security. The bureau is divided into four divisions. Sometimes referred to by critics as the "political police", it is responsible for controlling subversive activities, serving as the Royal Thai Police's primary intelligence and counterintelligence organization, as well as the lead unit for designated principals.

== History ==
The bureau was established on 17 November 1932 (Thai solar calendar year 2475) by Prajadhipok on the advice of The House of Representatives.

The SBB worked with the Malaysia Special Branch (SB) during the Cold War. During that time, SBB officers were involved in the Red Drum killings, in which 3,008 accused of being pro-communist were burned to death from 200-litre (44 imp gal; 53 US gal) red drums alive or semi-conscious and incinerated during the administration of Prime Minister Thanom Kittikachorn.

The SBB was accused of human rights violations toward Falun Gong practitioners. They have been promoted as a means of routing political opposition to the government. The division stirred controversy in the run-up to the 2007 general election when media revealed that the SBB had conducted its own opinion poll to assess the probable electoral outcome. In response to similar stories before the 2011 general election, the SB characterised its gathering of data as a study rather than a poll.

== Missions ==
- Counterintelligence and intelligence collection operations target actors or entities whose activities pose a direct threat to national security.
- Human resource development and training in police intelligence.
- Implementation of the Law on Nationality and other national security-related laws under police jurisdiction.
- Operations and management of the Special Branch Bureau's radio station.
- Police intelligence operations focus on integrated efforts to implement the Thailand National Security Strategy.
- Providing security for high-profile individuals and key locations related to national security in collaboration with the Bangkok Metropolitan Police Bureau (MPB) and Armed Forces Security Center (AFSC).
- Royal protective security operations for members of the Thai Royal Family.
- Handle Thai police clearance certificates for foreigner living in Thailand and renunciation of Thai nationality.

== Organization ==
=== Royal Thai Police Special Branch Bureau Headquarters ===
- General Staff Division Special Branch Bureau
- Intelligence Development Center
- Intelligence Expert Group
- Special Branch Division 1
- Special Branch Division 2
- Special Branch Division 3
- Special Branch Division 4
- Black Tiger

== See also ==
- Special Branch
