= Torsak Sukvimol =

Thai police officer (born 1964)

Police General Torsak Sukvimol
- ต่อศักดิ์ สุขวิมล
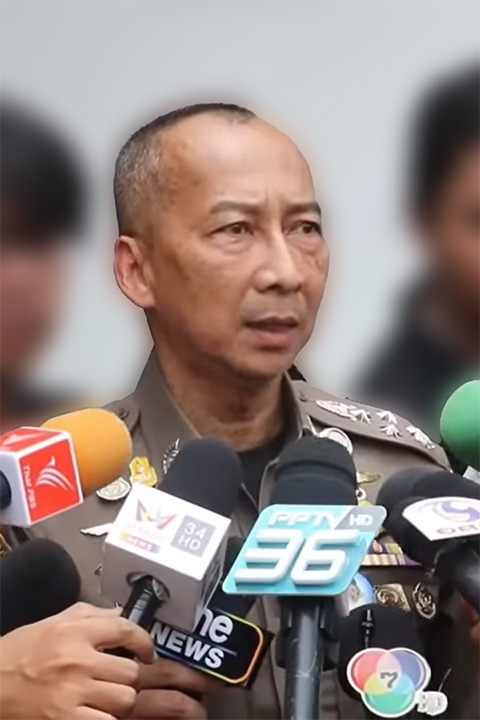

14th Commissioner-General of the Royal Thai Police
- In office 1 October 2023 – 30 September 2024
- Preceded by: Damrongsak Kittiprapas
- Succeeded by: Kitrat Panphet

Personal details
- Born: 27 January 1964 (age 62) Phetchaburi Province, Thailand

Torsak Sukvimol (Thai: ต่อศักดิ์ สุขวิมล) is a Thai police officer, who served as the 14th commissioner-general of the Royal Thai Police from 2023 to 2024.

== Career ==
Torsak was appointed by the Police Commission to succeed Damrongsak Kittiprapas following his retirement on 30 September 2023.

On 20 March 2024, Torsak, along with one of his deputies Surachate Hakparn, were suspended following concerns of a power struggle. He was reinstated on 20 June 2024.

Following his retirement on 1 October 2024, he was succeeded by Kitrat Panphet.

On 16 December 2024, the National Anti-Corruption Commission launched an investigation into Torsak for alleged bribery.
