= Royal Thai Police =

National law enforcement agency

Royal Thai Police สำนักงานตำรวจแห่งชาติ
- Official Seal

- Coat of Arms (cap badge)

- Flag of the Royal Thai Police
- Abbreviation: RTP

Agency overview
- Formed: 1860 (166 years ago)

Jurisdictional structure
- National agency: Thailand
- Operations jurisdiction: Thailand
- General nature: Civilian police

Operational structure
- Headquarters: Pathum Wan, Bangkok, Thailand
- Police officers: 230,000
- Minister responsible: Anutin Charnvirakul, Commander (as PM)
- Agency executive: Police General Samran Nualma, Commissioner-General
- Bureaus: 12: Metropolitan Police Bureau; Central Investigation Bureau; Tourist Police Bureau; Narcotics Suppression Bureau; Special Branch Bureau; Immigration Bureau; Police Education Bureau; Border Patrol Police; Office of Police Forensic Science; Office of Information Communications and Technology; Royal Police Cadet Academy; Police General Hospital; Cyber Crime Investigation Bureau
- Regional Bureaus: 9: Provincial Police Region 1—covering provinces: Phra Nakorn Si Ayutthaya; Lopburi; Chai Nat; Sing Buri; Ang Thong; Saraburi Province; Pathum Thani; Nonthaburi; Samut Prakan; Provincial Police Region 2—covering provinces: Chanthaburi; Trat; Sa Kaeo; Chachoengsao; Prachinburi; Chonburi; Rayong; Nakhon Nayok; Provincial Police Region 3—covering provinces: Chaiyaphum; Nakhon Ratchasima; Buriram; Yasothon; Surin; Sisaket; Amnat Charoen; Ubon Ratchathani; Provincial Police Region 4—covering provinces: Kalasin; Khon Kaen; Nakhon Phanom; Bueng Kan; Maha Sarakham; Mukdahan; Roi Et; Loei; Sakon Nakhon; Nong Khai; Nong Bua Lamphu; Udon Thani; Provincial Police Region 5—covering provinces: Chiang Mai; Chiang Rai; Lampang; Nan; Phrae; Lamphun; Mae Hong Son; Phayao; Provincial Police Region 6—covering provinces: Kamphaeng Phet; Tak; Nakhon Sawan; Phichit; Phitsanulok; Phetchabun; Sukhothai; Uttaradit; Uthai Thani; Provincial Police Region 7—covering provinces: Suphan Buri; Nakhon Pathom; Samut Songkhram; Samut Sakhon; Prachuap Khiri Khan; Phetchaburi; Ratchaburi; Kanchanaburi; Provincial Police Region 8—covering provinces: Chumphon; Ranong; Surat Thani; Nakhon Si Thammarat; Krabi; Phuket; Phang Nga; Provincial Police Region 9—covering provinces: Trang; Yala; Satun; Phatthalung; Pattani; Narathiwat

Website
- www.royalthaipolice.go.th

The Royal Thai Police (RTP) (Thai: สำนักงานตำรวจแห่งชาติ; RTGS: samnakngan tamruat haeng chat) is the national police force of Thailand. The RTP employs between 210,700 and 230,000 officers, roughly 17 percent of all civil servants (excluding the military and the employees of state-owned enterprises). Officers also undergo paramilitary training similar to the military but with an additional focus on law enforcement.

In regard to who is chief: as of 24 June 2024, the prime minister "has yet to approve Torsak's reinstatement". Earlier that month, media said that Torsak Sukvimol has been reinstated as national police chief. Earlier (20 March 2024), Kitrat Panphet became acting police chief; however, Torsak Sukvimol is still the police chief while having been transferred to an inactive post at the prime minister's office; on the day of the transfer, Torsak Sukvimol was in a meeting with the prime minister. As of 21 March, Police General Winai Thongsong "said [...] that he still could not confirm if the investigation would finish within the assigned 60 days or before the retirement of" Torsak Sukvimol in September.

Kitrat Panphet is the commissioner-general of the Royal Thai Police, appointed in October 2024.

== History ==
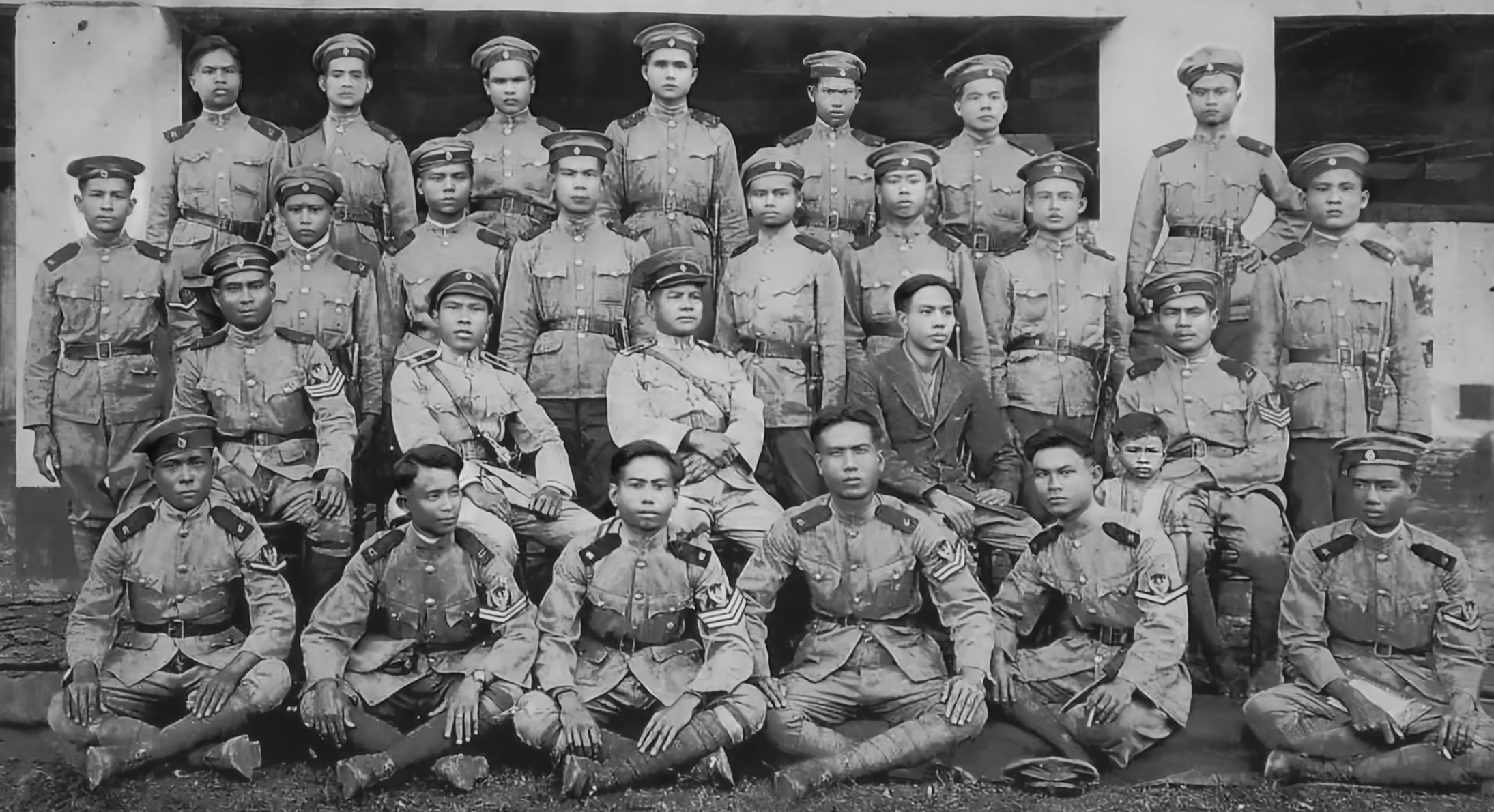
Thai police group portrait c. 1920

Until the 19th century Royal Thai Armed Forces personnel, aside from their duties of national defence, also performed law enforcement duties alongside dedicated civil servants. Responsibility for law and order was divided into the six ministries led by chancellors of state (during the Ayutthaya and Thonburi eras); in time of war, police units were under royal command as part of the army. Only during the reigns of King Mongkut (Rama IV) and King Chulalongkorn (Rama V) did the nation see a huge reform and the Westernization of Thai law enforcement forces to adapt to the changing situation and needs of the country. By 1902, the Royal Police Cadet Academy (RPCA) was founded to train future police officers. In the same year, King Chulalongkorn granted the Police its own symbol using the Phra Saeng sword (พระแสงดาบ) and the all evil-warding Chaturmuk (จตุรมุข) shield. In 1915 the provincial and urban police forces were united as one national organization under the Ministry of Interior (established 1894).

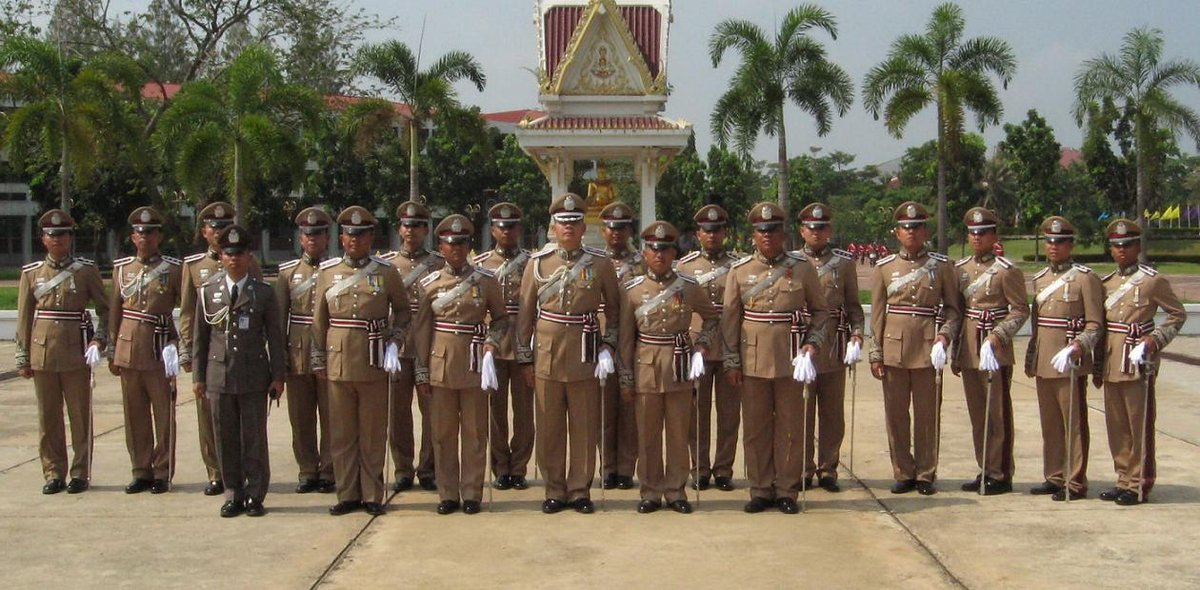
RPCA officers of Royal Police Cadet Academy

Originally modeled on the pre–World War II police of the Empire of Japan, the Thailand National Police Department (TNPD) was reorganized several times to meet changing public order and internal security needs. American advice, training, and equipment, which were provided from 1951 through the early 1970s, did much to introduce new law enforcement concepts and practices and to aid in the modernization of the TNPD. During this era the strength and effectiveness of the police grew steadily.

All components of the police system were administered by the TNPD headquarters in Bangkok, which also provided technical support for law enforcement activities throughout the kingdom. The major operational units of the force were the Provincial Police, the Border Patrol Police (BPP), the Metropolitan Police, and smaller specialized units supervised by the Central Investigation Bureau.

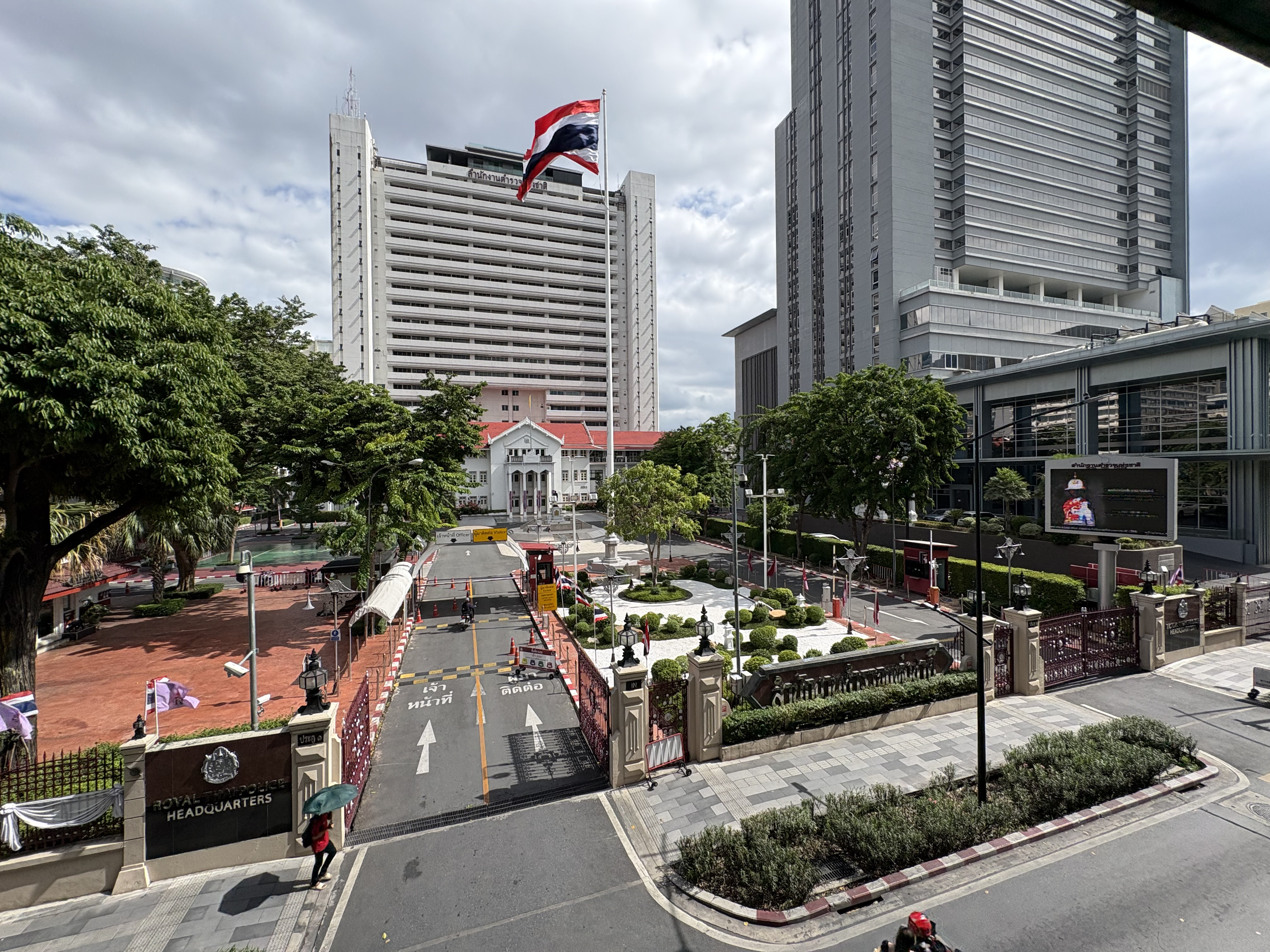
The Royal Thai Police headquarters in Pathum Wan, Bangkok

In mid-1987 the total strength of the TNPD, including administrative and support personnel, was estimated at roughly 110,000. Of this number, over one-half were assigned to the Provincial Police and some 40,000 to the BPP. More than 10,000 served in the Metropolitan Police. Quasi-military in character, the TNPD was headed by a director general, who held the rank of police general. He was assisted by three deputy directors general and five assistant directors general, all of whom held the rank of police lieutenant general. Throughout the TNPD system, all ranks except the lowest (constable) corresponded to those of the army. The proliferation of high ranks in the TNPD organizational structure, as in the military, indicated the political impact of the police on national life.

In 1998, TNPD was transferred from the Ministry of Interior of Thailand to be directly under the Office of the Prime Minister. It acquired a new name, in English, the "Royal Thai Police" (RTP). The title of its commander was changed from "Director-General of the TNPD" to "Commissioner-General of the Royal Thai Police".

== Personnel ==
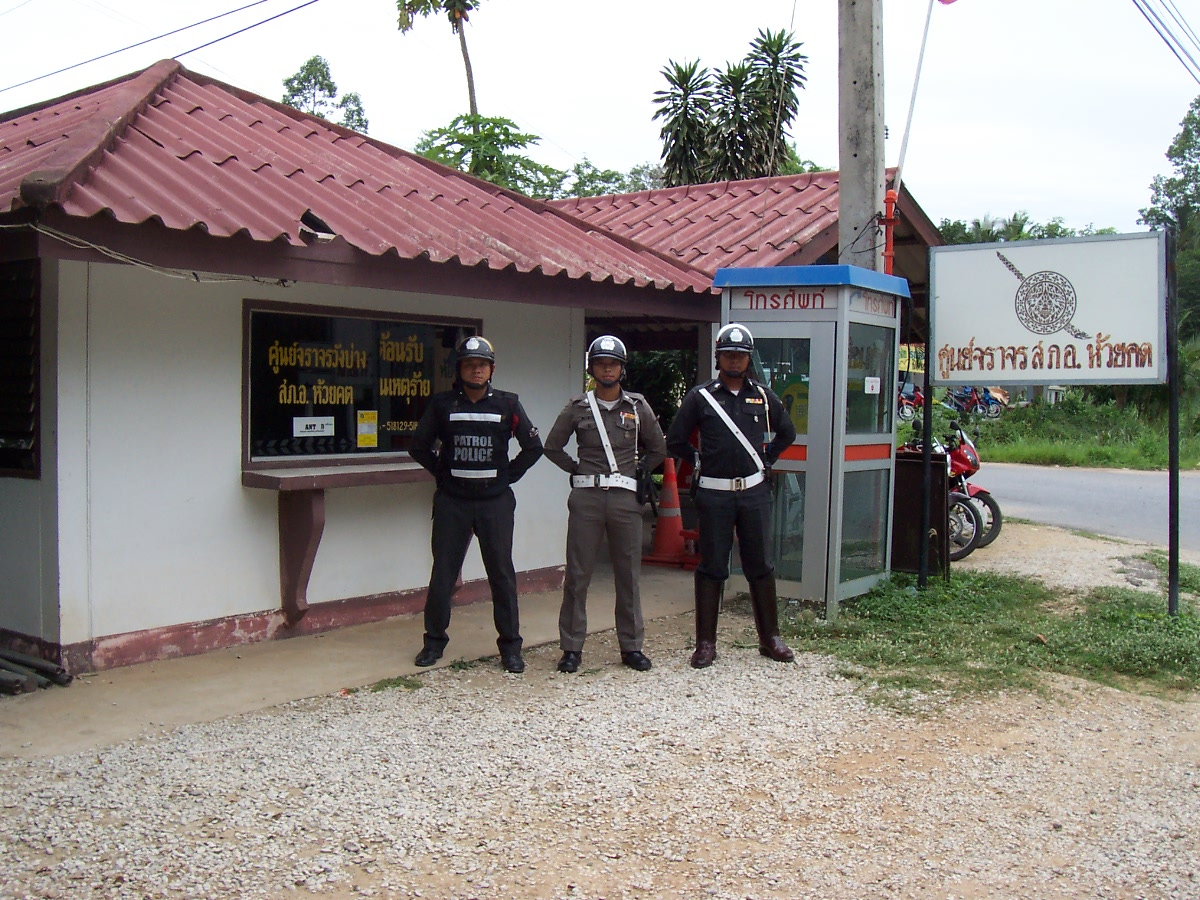
Thai Traffic Police officers at Huaikhot police booth in Uthai Thani Province

Thailand's police forces number about 230,000 officers. About eight percent (18,400) are female. For comparison, in the Philippines the percentage of female police officers is 20 percent, 18 percent in Malaysia, and 30 percent in Sweden which hold the world's highest percentage of female police officers. Of 8,000 investigators with the RTP, 400 are women.

Females were first admitted to the Royal Police Cadet Academy (RPCA), founded in 1901, in 2009. It has since graduated about 700 female officers. Starting with the class to be admitted for the 2019 academic year, the 280 places formerly reserved for females will be scrapped. Earlier in 2018, the RTP prohibited women from "inquiry official" roles. The rationale given was that women are hindered by domestic responsibilities, therefore less effective than male officers. Women will still be able to become police officers via other avenues. For example, women with law degrees will continue to be recruited.

National police chief Chakthip Chaijinda attributed the barring of women from the RPCA to a new Ministry of Defence ruling that all RPCA cadets must undergo an initial period of training at the male-only Armed Forces Academies Preparatory School (AFAPS). Critics say the new policy violates the 2015 Gender Equality Act, the constitution, Thailand's 20 year national strategy, as well as international conventions that prohibit gender discrimination.

== Organization ==
The Thai police are subdivided into several regions and services, each wielding their own powers.

=== Metropolitan Police Bureau ===
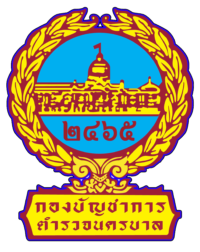
Metropolitan Police Bureau logo

Responsible for providing all law enforcement services for the capital city of Bangkok and its suburbs, the Metropolitan Police Bureau is probably the most visible and publicly recognizable of all Thai police components. This largely uniformed urban force operates under the command of a chief who holds the rank of police lieutenant general assisted by six deputy chiefs. Organizationally, the force consists of three divisions, each responsible for police services in one of the three urban areas: northern Bangkok, southern Bangkok, and Thonburi. As of 2019, there are 88 police stations across the capital, each with 30-200 police officers attached to it. In addition to covering the city with foot patrols, the Metropolitan Police maintains motorized units, a canine corps, building guards, traffic-control specialists, and law enforcement personnel trained to deal with juveniles. The Traffic Police Division also provides escorts and guards of honor for the king and visiting dignitaries and served as a riot-control force to prevent demonstrations and to disperse unruly crowds in Bangkok.

- Traffic Police Division, The Traffic Police Division (TPD) got its start in 1927 as the "Registration Division". TPD officers now are responsible for patrolling the roads throughout their areas of responsibility. In addition to their general road policing duties, they work to improve road safety, and deal with vehicle crimes and the criminal use of the road network. They back up other units as they are constantly roaming as part of their patrolling duties.
- Patrol and Special operation Division (191 Special Branch police), Patrol and Special operation Division is a direct commander of Arintharat 26 Special Operations Unit.
- Protection and Crowds Control Division (PCCD) got its start in 2009. PCCD has a mission to offer protection and security to the King, the Queen, the royal family, royal representative visitor's and with a crowd control mission.

=== Border Patrol Police Bureau ===
Patch of Border Patrol Police

A 40,000 person paramilitary force. The BPP and the PARU were largely creations of the US CIA. In the late-1950s and 1960s, "The BPP and PARU were integral in U.S. and Thai counterinsurgency efforts." The BPP, other than protecting the borders, countered "infiltration and subversion..." and operated "as guerrilla forces in enemy held areas" such as northeast and southern Thailand. The PARU was a small unit used on clandestine missions outside Thailand.

=== Central Investigation Bureau ===
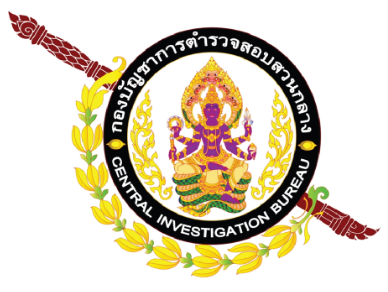
Central Investigation Bureau logo

The national coordinating headquarters has jurisdiction over the entire country. The CIB was organized to assist both provincial and metropolitan components of the Royal Thai Police in preventing and suppressing criminal activity and in minimizing threats to national security.

==== Divisions under Central Investigation Bureau ====
- Specialized units of the bureau, including the railroad, marine, highway, technology police, economic police and forestry police, who employ up-to-date technical equipment, law enforcement techniques, and training.
- Ten other divisions and offices employed modern procedures to assist in investigating and preventing crime.

- Crime Suppression Division (CSD) (Thai: กองบังคับการปราบปราม; RTGS: kong bang khap kan prappram ), one of the bureau's largest components, is responsible for conducting most of the technical investigations of criminal offenses throughout the kingdom. Its emergency unit copes with riots and other public disorders, sabotage, counterfeiting, fraud, illegal gambling operations, narcotics trafficking, and the activities of secret societies, and organized criminal associations. It is responsible for cases involving politics, notably elections.
- Special Service Division (SSD) (Thai: กองบังคับการปฏิบัติการพิเศษ; RTGS: kong bang khap kan patibutkan piset ), In October 2018, a new police unit, whose job it is to protect the monarchy, the "Special Service Division", was formed. The 1,600 man unit is to provide security to the royal family and to collect information on "individuals or groups whose behaviors pose a threat to the national security and His Majesty the King." The unit is also charged with carrying out the king's "royal wishes". On 28 January 2019, the unit's name was changed to "Ratchawallop Police Retainers, King's Guard 904". Its jurisdiction will extend to the entire country. In July 2020, the unit's change the name back to the "Special Service Division" and increase the authority to Counter-Terrorism, Resisting sabotage, riot control and bomb disposal in the area around the royal court.
- Anti Trafficking in Persons Crime Suppression Division (ATPD) (Thai: กองบังคับการปราบปรามการค้ามนุษย์; RTGS: kong bang khap kan prappram kan khamnut ) is a specialized law enforcement unit dedicated to combating human trafficking and related crimes. Its primary mission is to prevent, suppress, and dismantle networks involved in the exploitation of individuals, including forced labor, sexual exploitation, and child trafficking.
- Highway Police Division (HPD)(Thai: กองบังคับการตำรวจทางหลวง; RTGS: kong bang khap kan tamruat thangluang ) is tasked with ensuring safety, security, and efficiency on Thailand's roadways. Its responsibilities include patrolling highways, enforcing traffic laws, managing road accidents, and assisting motorists.
- Economic Crime Suppression Division (ECD) (Thai: กองบังคับการปราบปรามการกระทำความผิดเกี่ยวกับอาชญากรรมทางเศรษฐกิจ; RTGS: kong bang khap kan prappram kankratham khwamphit kiaokap atyakam thang sarasetkit ) is a specialized unit responsible for investigating and preventing economic and financial crimes that affect Thailand’s economy and public trust.
- Natural Resources and Environmental Crime Suppression Division (NED) (Thai: กองบังคับการปราบปรามการกระทำความผิดเกี่ยวกับทรัพยากรธรรมชาติและสิ่งแวดล้อม; RTGS: kong bang khap kan prappram kan kratham khwam phit kiao kap tharapyakrotronmachat ilae singwaetlom ) is a dedicated unit tasked with combating crimes that harm Thailand's natural resources and environment. Its scope of work includes addressing illegal logging, wildlife trafficking, pollution violations, and unauthorized exploitation of natural resources such as minerals and water.
- Consumer Protection Crime Suppression Police Division (CPPD) (Thai: กองบังคับการปราบปรามการกระทำความผิดเกี่ยวกับการคุ้มครองผู้บริโภค; RTGS: kong bang khap kan prappram kan kratham khwam phit kiaokap kan khumkhrong phupriphok ) is dedicated to safeguarding the rights and well-being of consumers across Thailand. Its primary responsibilities include investigating and preventing crimes related to consumer fraud, substandard or counterfeit goods, false advertising, and violations of consumer protection laws.
- Technology Crime Suppression Division (TCSD) (Thai: กองบังคับการปราบปรามการกระทำความผิดเกี่ยวกับอาชญากรรมทางเทคโนโลยี; RTGS: kong bang khap kan prappram kan kratham khwamphit kiao kap atyakam thang theknoloyi ) specializes in combating crimes involving technology and cyberspace, including cyber fraud, hacking, online scams, and violations of Thailand’s Computer Crime Act.
- Anti-Corruption Crime Suppression Division (ACD) (Thai: กองบังคับการป้องกันปราบปรามการทุจริตและประพฤติมิชอบ; RTGS: kong bang khap kan pongkan prappram kan thutrit lae praphritimichop ) is responsible for investigating and preventing corruption-related offenses, focusing on cases involving public officials, bribery, and abuse of power to ensure transparency and accountability in governance.
- Thai Marine Police Division (TMPD) (Thai: กองบังคับการตำรวจน้ำ; RTGS: kong bang khap kan tamruat nam ) is tasked with maintaining security and law enforcement in Thailand's territorial waters, focusing on combating illegal activities such as smuggling, human trafficking, and illegal fishing, while also conducting rescue operations and ensuring maritime safety and resource protection.
- Central Investigation Bureau Training Center (Thai: ศูนย์ฝึกอบรมกองบัญชาการตำรวจสอบสวนกลาง; RTGS: sun fuek oprom kong ban cha kan tamruat sop suanklang ) provides specialized training for law enforcement officers in advanced investigative techniques, criminal analysis, and law enforcement strategies to enhance the capabilities of the Central Investigation Bureau in solving complex cases and maintaining public safety.
- Hanuman Special Operations Unit (Thai: หน่วยปฎิบัติการพิเศษหนุมาน; RTGS: nuai padibatkanphiset hanuman ) is the CIB's tactical team specializing in high-risk operations such as counter-terrorism, hostage rescue, and combating organized crime, utilizing advanced training and equipment to ensure national security and public safety.
- The Criminal Records Office collects and maintains records required in the conduct of police work, including dossiers and fingerprints of known criminals and persons suspected of wrongdoing.
- The Scientific Crime Detection Laboratory, where technicians perform the requisite chemical and physical analyses.
- Licenses Division: registered and licensed firearms, vehicles, gambling establishments, and various other items and enterprises as required by law.

=== Immigration Bureau ===
The Immigration Bureau is responsible for issuing travel visas and managing entry and departure in Thailand. The Immigration Police are a frequent target of criticism from expatriates who decry slow service, inconsistent application of regulations, and excessive filing of paper forms. Referring to just one of scores of immigration forms, the TM6 Arrival-Departure Card, Kobsak Pootrakool, deputy secretary-general to the prime minister, admitted that, "The immigration police have to have a huge warehouse to store these papers," Kobsak said, adding that the police rarely look at the information in the forms, which are only stored "just in case". The government expects a 20 million visitors to Thailand this year, each required to complete a TM6 form. The form will be replaced by mobile phone app in 2019.

=== Narcotics Suppression Bureau ===
Narcotics Suppression Bureau is the lead agency for counter-narcotics investigations in Thailand. It has a tactical unit known as Sayobpairee 43.

=== Office of Logistics ===
==== Thai Police Aviation division ====
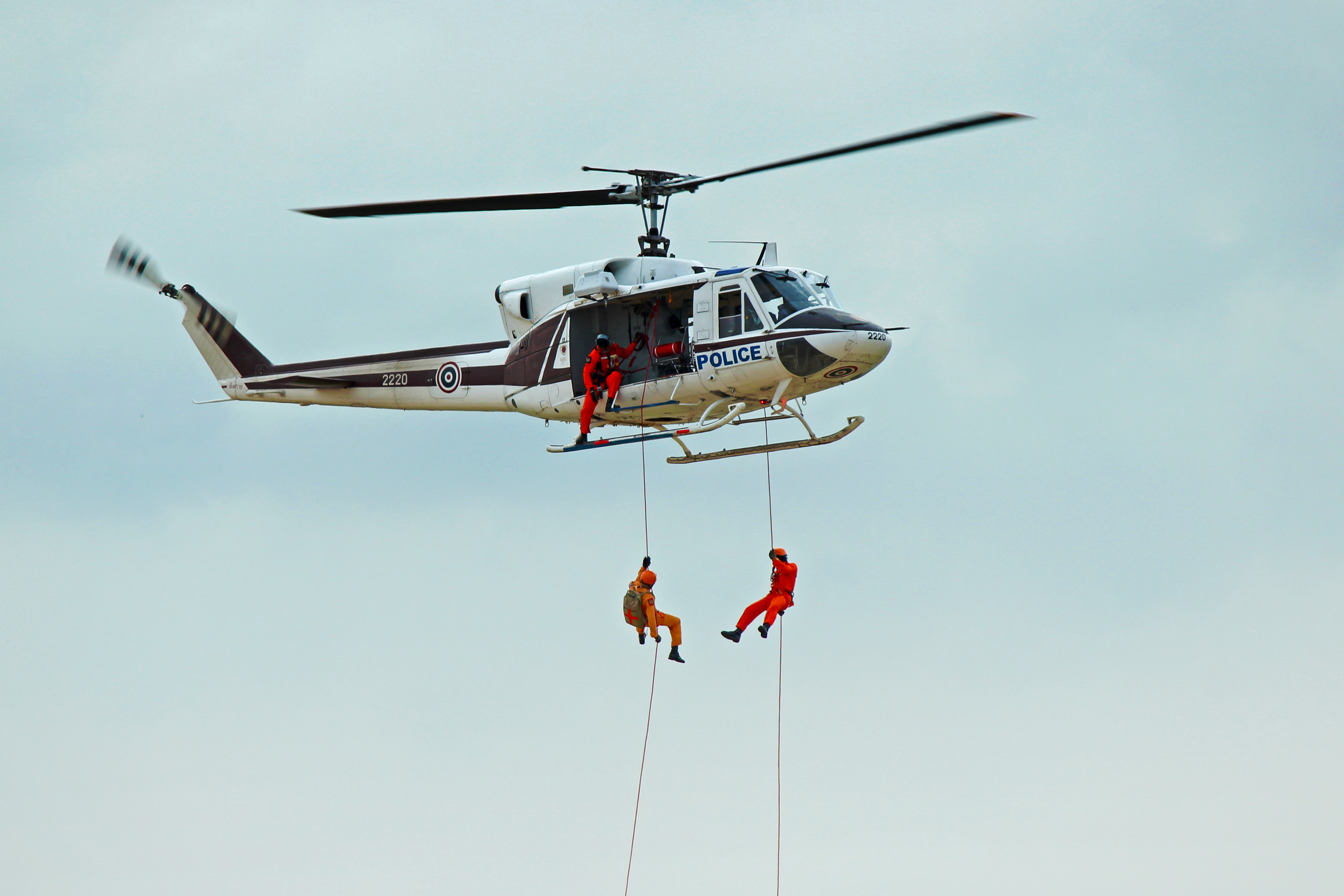
RTP Bell 212 helicopter demonstration

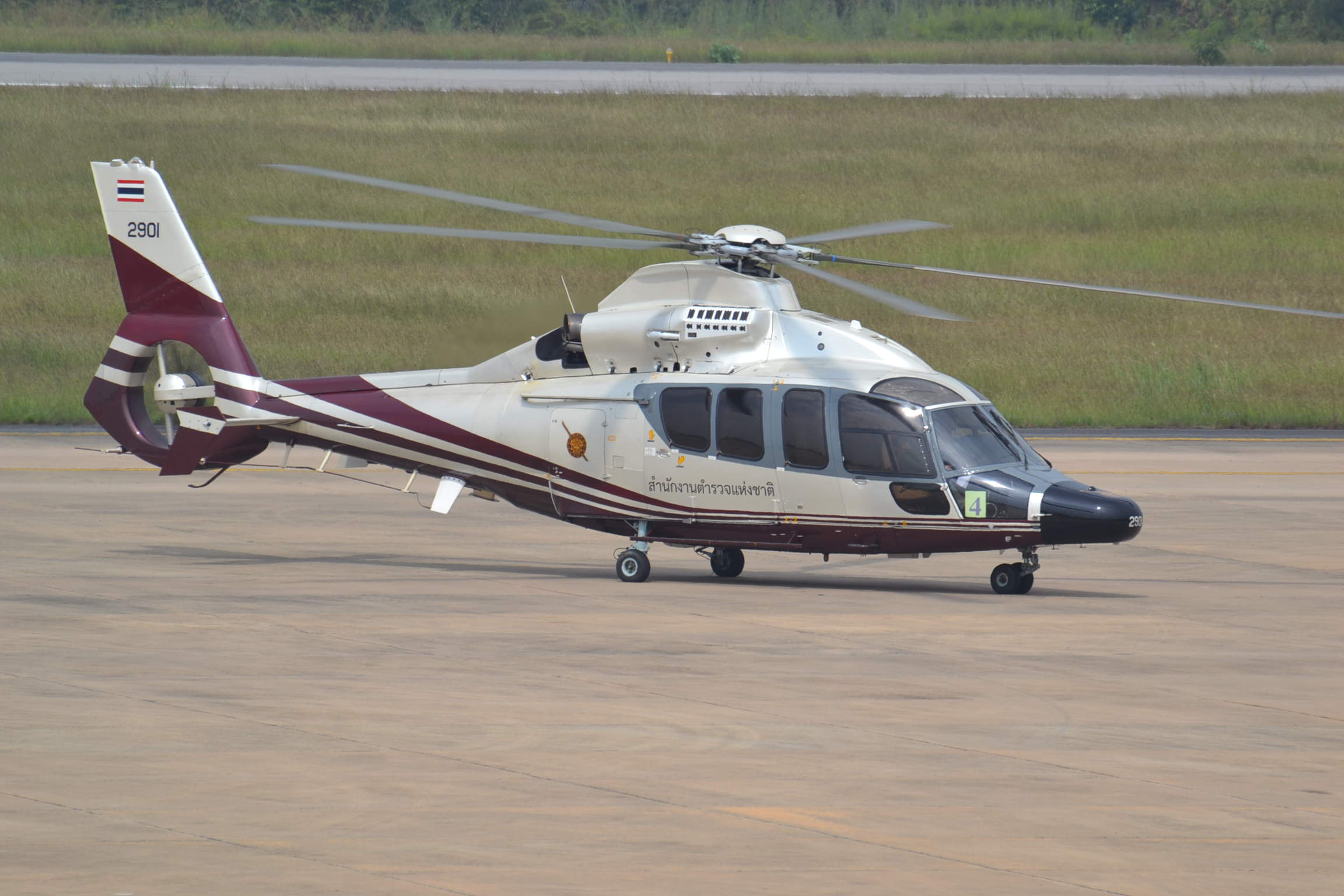
RTP Eurocopter EC155, Khon Kaen, 2013

The RTP operates 9 fixed wing and 54 rotary-wing aircraft (as of February 2023) :

- 1 Dassault Falcon 2000S
- 1 Fokker 50
- 2 Casa CN-235-200 M
- 2 Super King Air 350
- 3 DHC-6-400
- 2 Airbus Helicopters H175
- 4 AgustaWestland AW189 Helicopters
- 5 Eurocopter EC155B-1 Helicopters
- 2 Eurocopter AS365N3+ Dauphin Helicopters
- 17 Bell 412HP/EP/EPi Helicopters
- 12 Bell 212 Helicopters. 1 lost May 2025.
- 2 Bell 206L-4 LongRanger IV Helicopters
- 9 Bell 429 Helicopters

=== Office of the Surgeon General ===
Responsible for medical and healthcare-related services for the police, including forensic science and autopsies. It is headquartered at Police General Hospital in Pathum Wan District, Bangkok and operates Dara Rasmi Hospital in Chiang Mai, Nawutti Somdet Ya Hospital in Bangkok and Yala Sirirattanarak Hospital in Yala. It also operates the Institute of Forensic Science which trains a number of residents in forensic science each year.

=== Provincial Police division ===
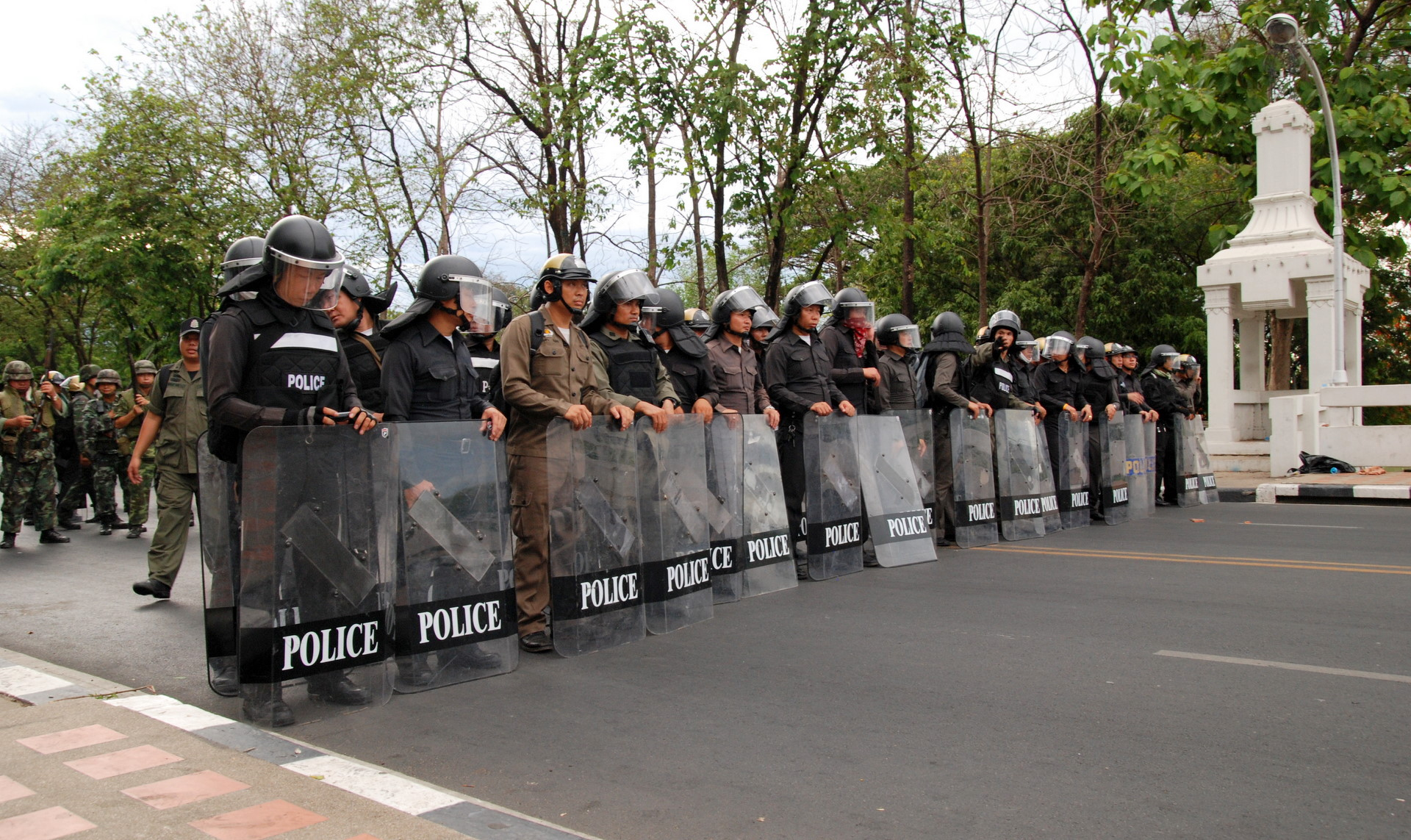
Thai policemen and policewomen equipped with riot shields, Nawarat Bridge, Chiang Mai, 2010

The Provincial Police form the largest of the Royal Thai Police operational components in both personnel and geographic responsibility. It is headed by a commander who reported to the police commissioner-general, and administered through four police regions—geographic areas of responsibility similar to those of the army regional commands. This force provides police services to every town and village throughout the kingdom except metropolitan Bangkok and border areas. The Provincial Police thus handled law enforcement activities and in many cases was the principal representative of the central government's authority in much of the country.

During the 1960s and early-1970s, as the police assumed an increasing role in counterinsurgency operations, a lack of coordination among security forces operating in the rural areas became apparent. Observers noted that the overall police effort suffered because of conflicting organizational patterns and the highly centralized control system that required decisions on most matters to emanate from the various police bureaus of the (then) TNPD headquarters in Bangkok.

A reorganization of the TNPD in 1978 and 1979 gave more command authority to the four police lieutenant generals who served as regional commissioners of the Provincial Police. Thereafter, the senior officers of each region not only controlled all provincial police assigned to their respective geographic areas but also directed the railroad, highway, marine, and forestry police units operating there, without going through the chain of command to the Central Investigation Bureau in Bangkok. Although this change increased the workload of the regional headquarters, it resulted in greater efficiency and improved law enforcement.

The Provincial Police Division is divided into 10 regions covering the 76 provinces of Thailand except metropolitan Bangkok and the border areas:

- Provincial Police Region 1 - Phra Nakorn Si Ayuthaya
- Provincial Police Region 2 - Chonburi
- Provincial Police Region 3 - Nakhon Ratchasima
- Provincial Police Region 4 - Khon Kaen
- Provincial Police Region 5 - Chiang Mai
- Provincial Police Region 6 - Phitsanulok
- Provincial Police Region 7 - Nakhon Pathom
- Provincial Police Region 8 - Phuket
- Provincial Police Region 9 - Songkhla
- Special Operations Units

=== Police Education Bureau ===
The RTP Education Bureau is responsible for training police personnel in the latest methods of law enforcement and the use of modern weapons. It operates the Royal Police Cadet Academy in Sam Phran District, Nakhon Pathom Province, for the officer corps, the detective training school at Bang Kaen, the Metropolitan Police Training School at Bang Kaen, and the Provincial Police training centers at Nakhon Pathom, Lampang, Nakhon Ratchasima, and Yala. The bureau also supervises a number of sites established and staffed by the BPP to train its field platoons in counterinsurgency operations. These sites include a large national facility near Hua Hin and smaller facilities in Udon Thani, Ubon Ratchathani, Chiang Mai, and Songkhla.

=== Special Branch Bureau ===
Special Branch Bureau is a Special Branch — sometimes referred to by critics as the "political police", is responsible for controlling subversive activities and serves as the Thai Police's major intelligence organization, as well as the unit responsible for VIP protection.

=== Tourist Police Bureau ===
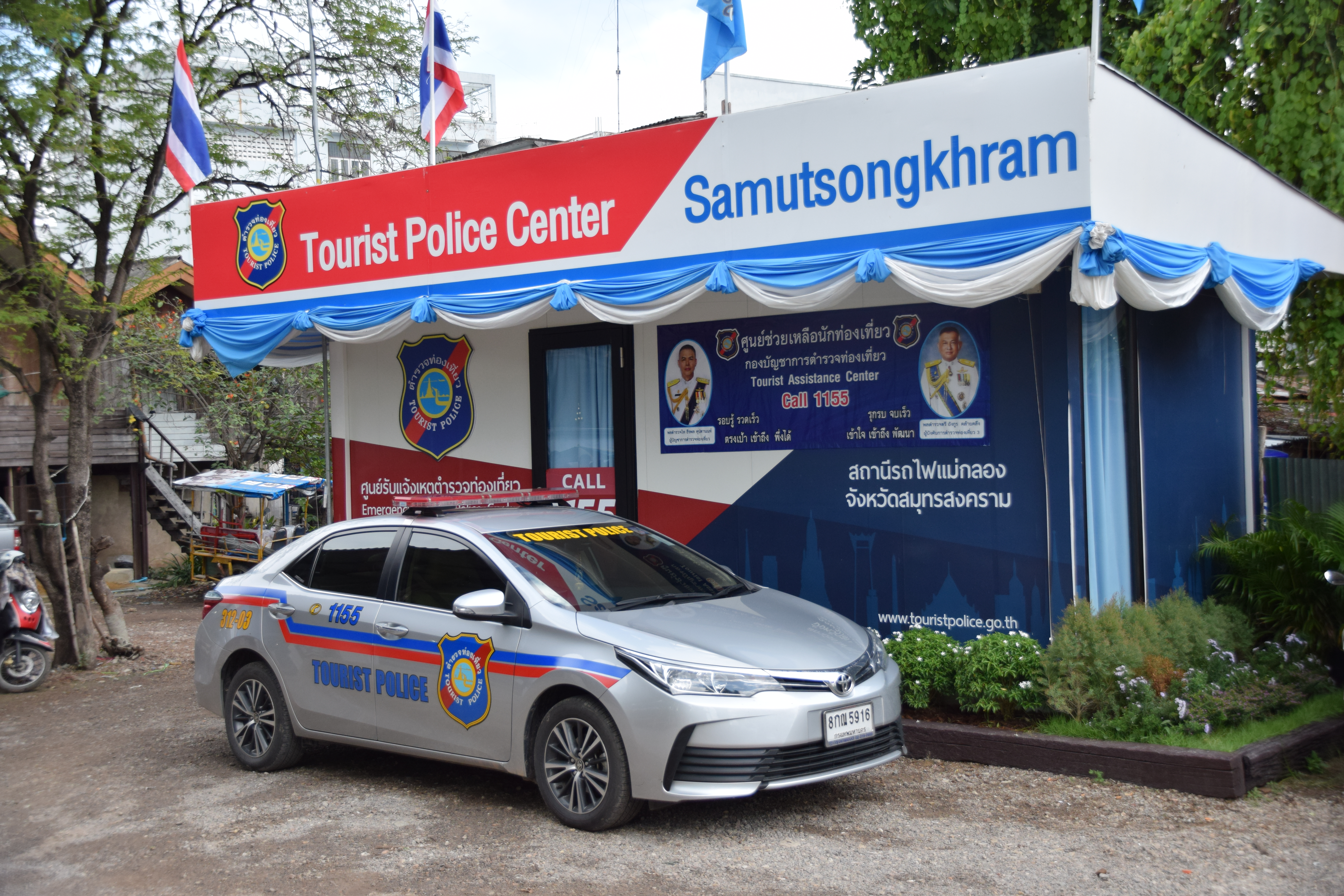
Tourist police center in Samut Songkhram

The Tourist Police Bureau was elevated from the Tourist Police Division under Central Investigation Bureau in 2017. The creation of the Tourist Police is due to the fact that the tourism and entertainment industry in Thailand is growing every year, and the number of people arriving in the country is constantly increasing. The priorities of the Tourist Police include cooperation with foreign nationals and the promotion of their security.

According to Reuters correspondent, Andrew Marshall, "The country has a special force of Tourist Police, set up specifically so that foreigners have as little contact as possible with the ordinary police—the effect on the crucial tourism industry would be chilling."

According to one source, in 2017 there were 1,700 enlisted tourist police on the force. As of 2019 the agency has 2,000 officers and 70 tourist police cars for use nationwide.

== Transportation ==
As of 2023, the RTP has a fleet of some 62 aircraft including a six passenger, 1.14 billion baht (US$37 million) police jet, a Dassault Falcon 2000S.

The Royal Thai Police, especially the provincial forces, extensively uses pickup trucks and SUVs. For traffic regulation and patrolling in cities, sedans and motorcycles are also used. Highway police vehicles generally also have equipment like speed radars, breath analyzers, and emergency first aid kits. They also use tuk-tuks, minivans, bicycles, all-terrain vehicles, boats, and helicopters. As of April 2020, the RTP operate seven leased electric patrol cars used to protect "VVIPs". "They will replace the Mercedes-Benz A Class and will be used in the government's VVIP's motorcade", a spokesman explained.

Royal Thai Police vehicle colors vary widely according to grade, region, and kind of duty performed. Bangkok metropolitan police vehicles are black and white. Provincial police vehicles are maroon and white while highway police are maroon and yellow.

== Firearms ==
There are no standard-issue handguns carried by the Royal Thai Police. Police officer must buy their own pistol and they must buy what is available in Thailand and what they can afford. If the officer cannot afford a pistol, they may purchase one by paying in installments through their police co-operative.

One of the most popular police pistols is the M1911A1 .45 ACP, which can be cheaply and readily found in Thailand. The 9mm Glock 19 is another popular and reliable albeit more expensive choice.

In mid-2015, Pol Gen Somyot Phumphanmuang, Royal Thai Police Commissioner, initiated a program to allow officers to purchase US-made, 9 mm SIG Sauer P320 pistols for 18,000 baht each. The Thai market price for this gun is several times higher. The affordable price is made possible by a special police exemption from import quotas and import duties. In December 2017, 150,000 SIG Sauer P320SP pistols became available for purchase by police for 23,890 baht each. The RTP will, in addition, distribute 55,000 of the new pistols to police stations nationwide, each station receiving 60.

Although the RTP does not issue pistols, long guns are made available by the government. Common are the Heckler & Koch MP5 and FN P90 sub-machine guns, Remington 870 shotguns, the M4 carbine, and M16 rifles.

Photo	Model	Type	Caliber	Origin	Notes
Pistols
	M1911	Semi-automatic pistol	.45 ACP	US; Thailand	Thai M1911A1 pistols produced under license; locally known as the Type 86 pistol (ปพ.86).
	Heckler & Koch USP	Semi-automatic pistol	.45 ACP	Germany	Used by Arintaraj 26 Special Operations Unit and Naresuan 261 Special Operation Unit
	HS2000	Semi-automatic pistol	9×19 mm Parabellum	Croatia	Used by Arintaraj 26 Special Operations Unit and Naresuan 261 Special Operation Unit
	CZ 75	Semi-automatic pistol	9×19mm Parabellum	Czech Republic	
	Beretta 92	Semi-automatic pistol	9×19mm Parabellum	Italy	
	Beretta M1951	Semi-automatic pistol	9×19mm Parabellum	Italy	
	Beretta Px4 Storm	Semi-automatic pistol	9×19mm Parabellum	Italy	Used by Arintaraj 26 Special Operations Unit and Naresuan 261 Special Operation Unit
	Browning Hi-Power	Semi-automatic pistol	9×19mm Parabellum	Belgium	
	SIG Sauer P226	Semi-automatic pistol	9×19mm Parabellum	Germany	Used by Arintaraj 26 Special Operations Unit and Naresuan 261 Special Operation Unit
	SIG P320SP	Semi-automatic pistol	9×19mm Parabellum	United States	Standard service pistol
	SIG P365 RTP	Semi-automatic pistol	9×19mm Parabellum	United States	
	Smith & Wesson Model 60	Revolver	.38 Special	United States	
	Colt Python	Revolver	.357 Magnum	United States	
	Smith & Wesson Model 15	Revolver	.38 Special	United States	
	Smith & Wesson Model 19	Revolver	.357 Magnum	United States	
	Glock	Semi-automatic pistol	9×19mm Parabellum	Austria	The Glock 17, 19, 21, 26, 30, 43X are commonly seen.
	FN Five-seven	Semi-automatic pistol	FN 5.7×28 mm	Belgium	
Shotguns
	Remington Model 870	Shotgun	12 gauge	USA	Used by Arintaraj 26 Special Operations Unit and Naresuan 261 Special Operation Unit
	Mossberg 500	Shotgun	12 gauge	USA	
	Franchi SPAS-12	Shotgun	12 gauge	Italy	Used by Arintaraj 26 Special Operations Unit and Naresuan 261 Special Operation Unit
	Benelli M3	Shotgun	12 gauge	Italy	Common Police Shotgun
	Benelli Supernova	Shotgun	12 gauge	Italy	Common Police Shotgun
Submachine guns
	Heckler & Koch MP5	Submachine gun	9×19mm Parabellum	Germany	Used by Arintaraj 26 Special Operations Unit and Naresuan 261 Special Operation Unit
	Heckler & Koch UMP	Submachine gun	9×19mm Parabellum	Germany	Used by Arintaraj 26 Special Operations Unit and Naresuan 261 Special Operation Unit
	Heckler & Koch MP7	Submachine gun	HK 4.6×30 mm	Germany	Used by Arintaraj 26 Special Operations Unit and Naresuan 261 Special Operation Unit
	SIG Sauer MPX	Submachine gun	9×19mm Parabellum	United States	Commonly used by Patrol Officers and Specialist Teams under the designation SIG MPX RTP.
	FN P90	Submachine gun	5.7x28 mm	Belgium	Used by Arintaraj 26 Special Operations Unit and Naresuan 261 Special Operation Unit
	UZI	Submachine gun	9×19mm Parabellum	Israel	Used by Arintaraj 26 Special Operations Unit and Naresuan 261 Special Operation Unit
	KRISS Vector	Submachine gun	9×19mm Parabellum	US	Used by Arintaraj 26 Special Operations Unit and Naresuan 261 Special Operation Unit
	CZ Scorpion Evo 3	Submachine gun	9×19mm Parabellum	Czech Republic	Used by police units
Assault rifles
	M16	Assault rifle	5.56×45 mm NATO	US	M16A1, M16A2, M16A4. Being phased out by Colt M4/AR-15 rifles, however M203 variants still used by Border Patrol Police.
	M4 Carbine	Assault rifle	5.56×45mm NATO	US	M4, M4A1, M4A3
	Colt M5	Assault rifle	5.56×45mm NATO	US	Used by various Specialist units and Naresuan 261 Special Operation Unit.
	SIG MCX	Assault rifle	5.56×45mm NATO	US	Used by Arintaraj 26 Special Operations Unit
	Beretta ARX160	Assault rifle	5.56×45mm NATO	Italy	Used by Arintaraj 26 Special Operations Unit
	H&K G36C H&K G36K	Assault rifle	5.56×45mm NATO	Germany	Used by Naresuan 261 Special Operation Unit.
	FN FAL	Battle Rifle	7.62×51mm NATO	Belgium	Formerly used by Border Patrol Police. Now in storage. Designated in Thai as ปลย./ปลก. 05.
	HK33	Assault rifle	5.56×45 mm NATO	Germany	Kept in armories and used in training.
	FN CAL	Assault rifle	5.56×45 mm NATO	Belgium	Formerly used by Border Patrol Police. Now in storage. Designated in Thai as ปลย./ปลก. 14.
Machine guns
	M60	General-purpose machine gun	7.62×51mm NATO	US	Used by Border Patrol Police
	MG3	General-purpose machine gun	7.62×51mm NATO	Germany	Used by Border Patrol Police on its V-150's
	SIG LMG	Light machine gun	7.62×51mm NATO	US	Used by Matchanu Special Operations Unit of the Thai Marine Police Division.
	FN Minimi	Light machine gun	5.56×45mm NATO	Belgium	Used by Border Patrol Police and Para version used by Naresuan 261 Special Operation Unit
Grenade launchers
	M203	Grenade launcher	40×46mm	US	Used by Border Patrol Police
	M79	Grenade launcher	40×46mm	US	Used by Border Patrol Police
Anti-tank systems
	Type 69	Rocket-propelled grenade	85 mm	China	Used by Border Patrol Police
Less-than-lethal systems
	TASER X2 Defender	Electroshock weapon	Electric cartridge	US	Used by Patrol officers
	FN 303	Riot gun	17.3 mm Pallets	Belgium	Used by Crowd Control and Protection Division, Metropolitan Police Bureau
	Riot Gun	Riot gun	37mm/40×46mm Projectiles	US	Used by Crowd Control and Protection Division, Metropolitan Police Bureau

== Uniforms ==
Royal Thai Police uniforms vary widely according to rank, region, and kind of duty performed. Among the police, uniforms tend to resemble army dress rather than conventional police uniforms.

Considered part of the police "uniform", all male officers are required to shave the sides and back of their heads, leaving a short crop of hair on the top, hence its common name, (Thai: ขาวสามด้าน; RTGS: khao sam dan), or 'three white sides'. The models for the haircut are the royal guards who protect King Vajiralongkorn. They are known for their short haircuts, required by the monarch. "It's a royal practice," a retired police general said. "...we are all serving His Majesty the King...It looks beautiful...It doesn't hurt anyone."

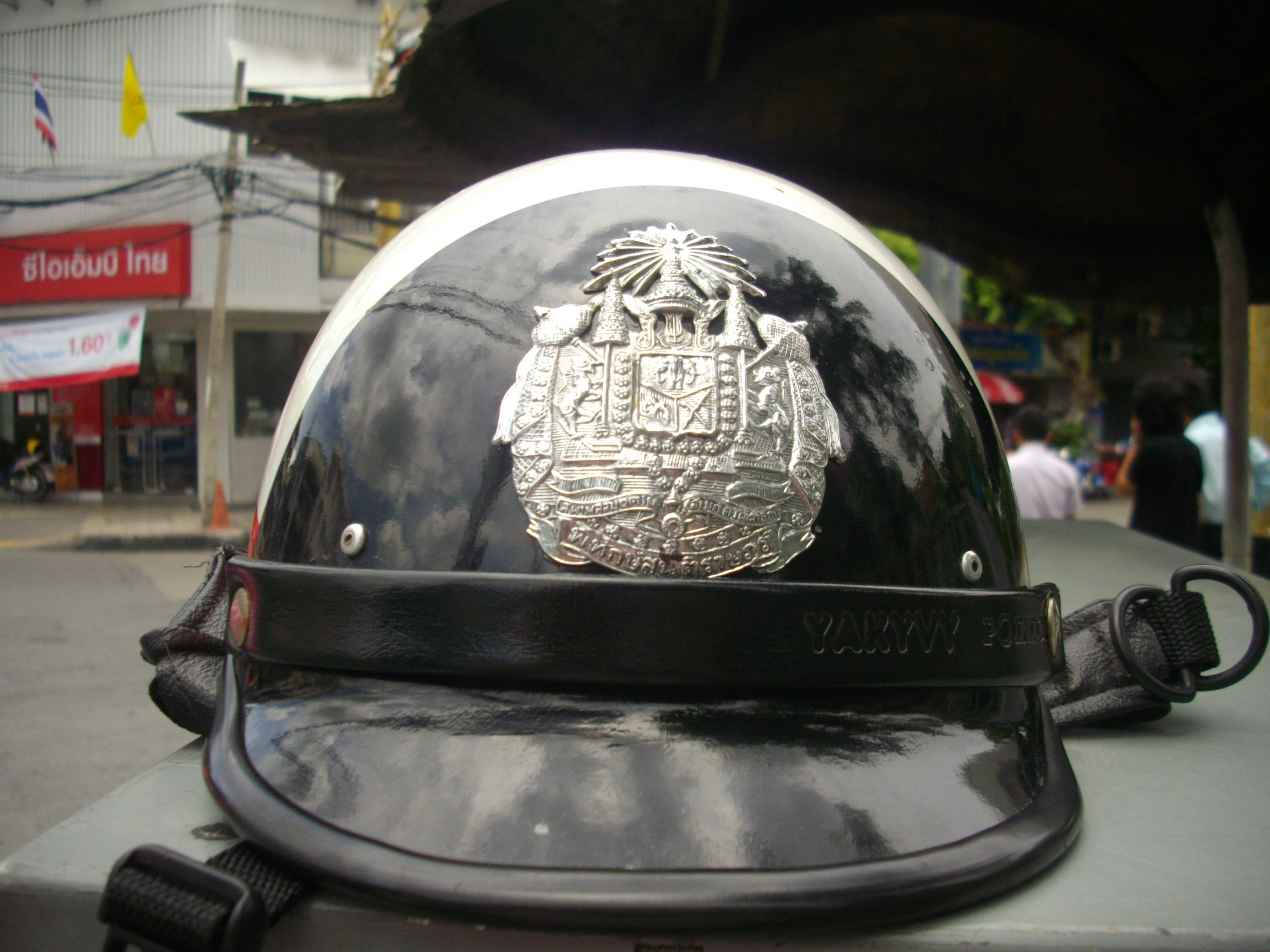
A helmet for traffic police in Bangkok, Thailand August 31, 2010.

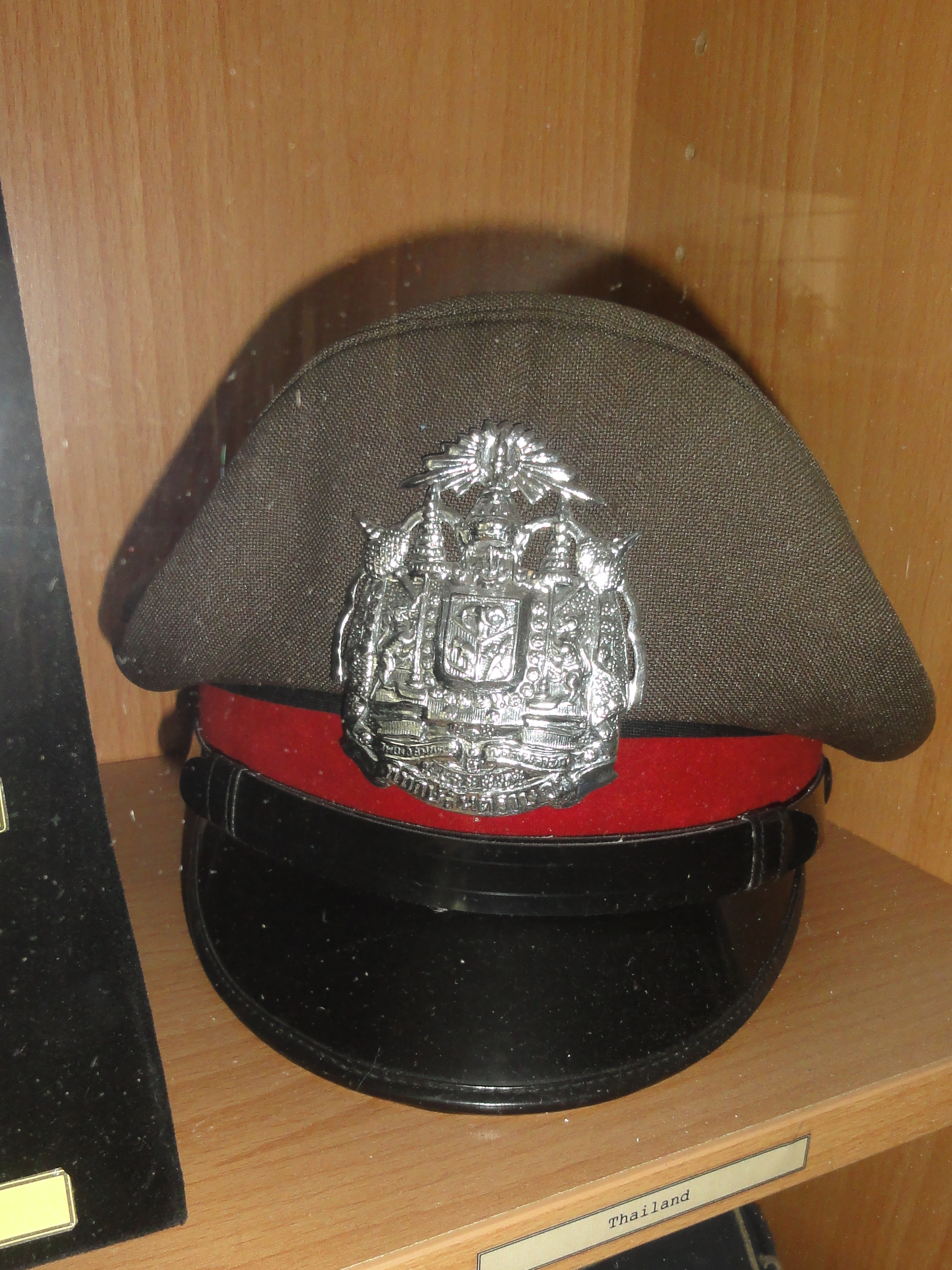
Police peaked caps of Royal Thai Police.

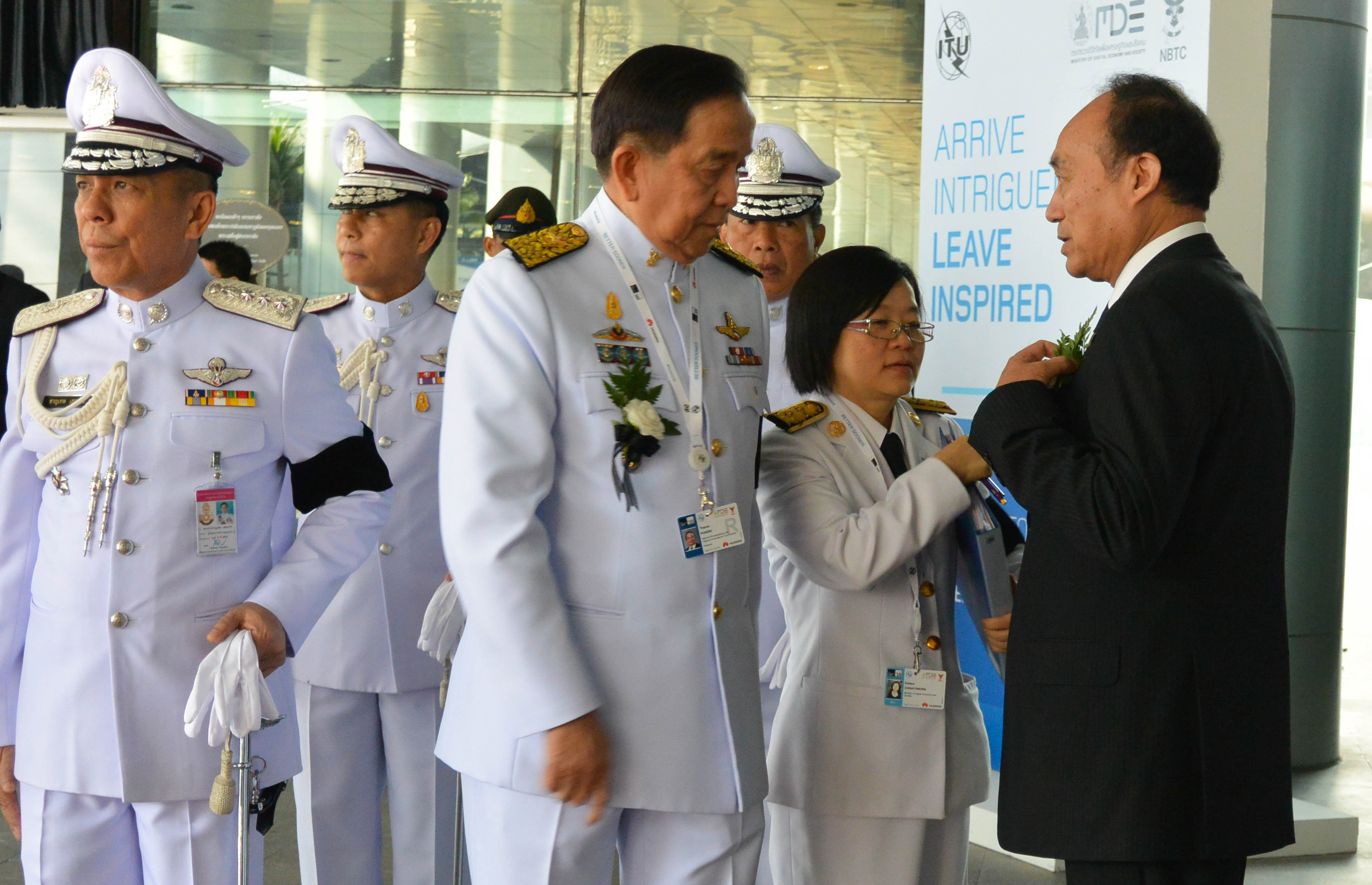
Royal Thai Police white normal dress uniform

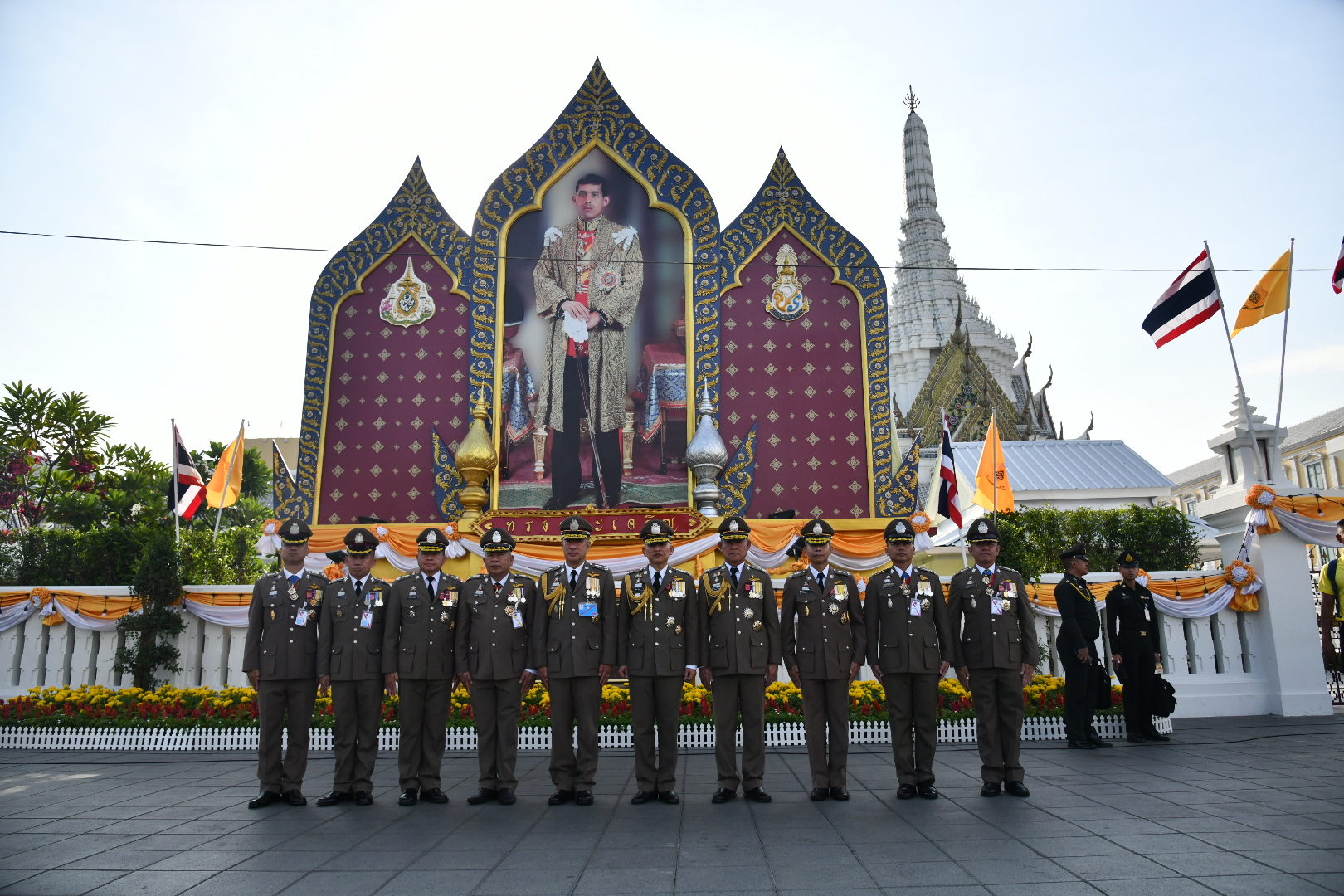
Royal Thai Police grey full dress uniform

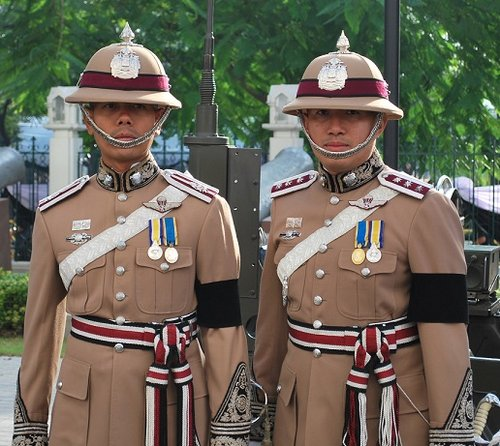
Thai Commissioned Officer kraki full dress uniform

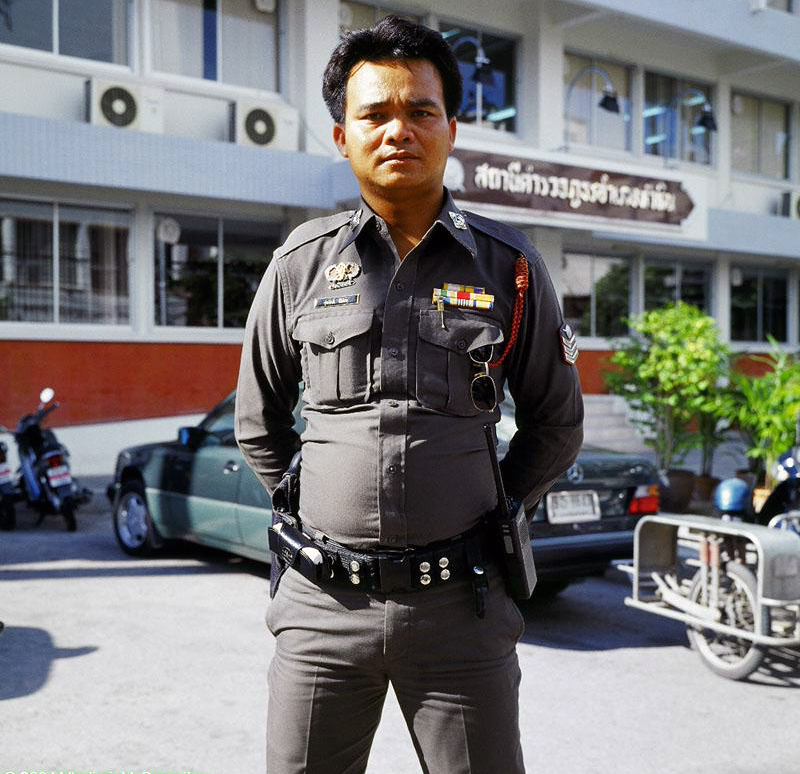
Royal Thai Police officer uniform

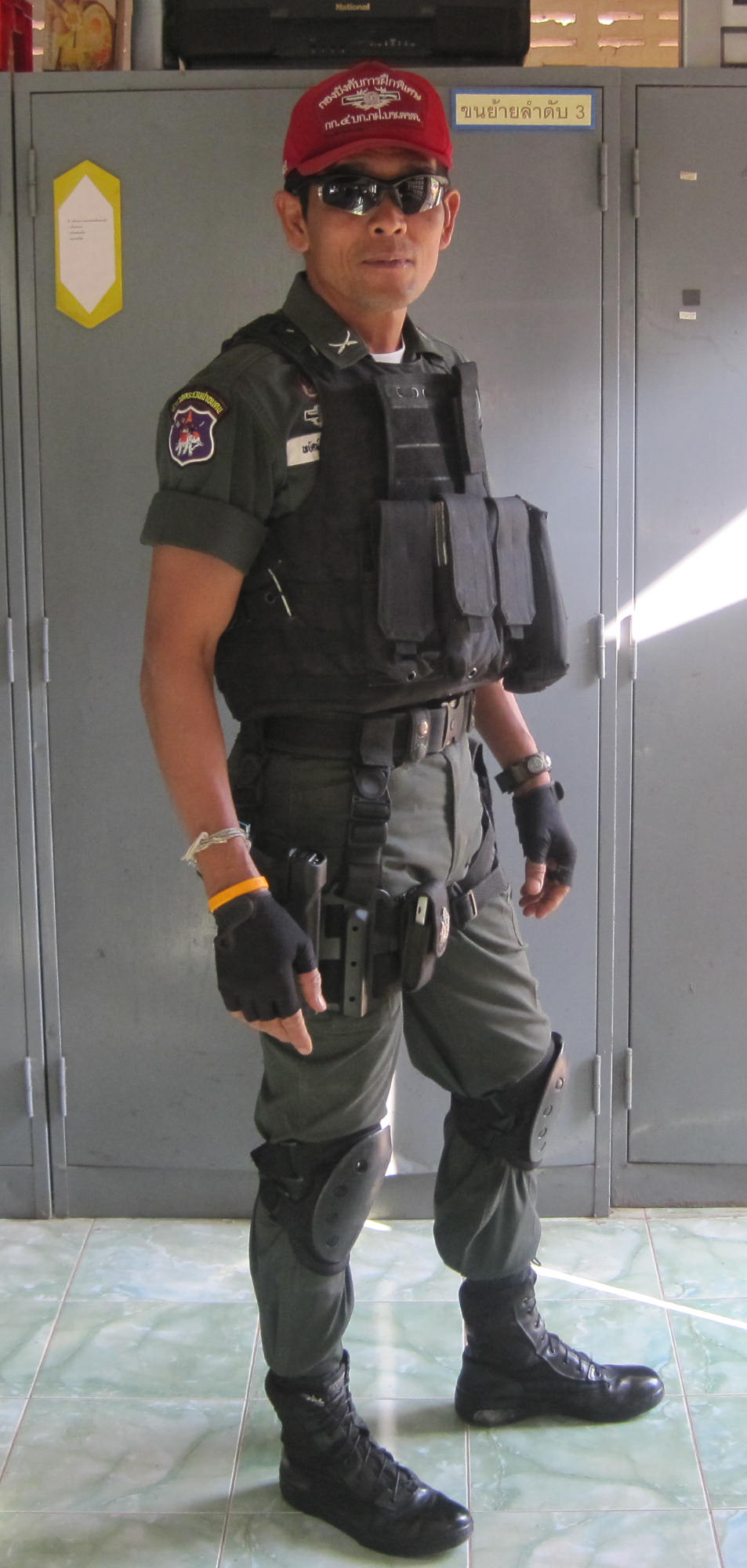
Border Patrol Police field uniform

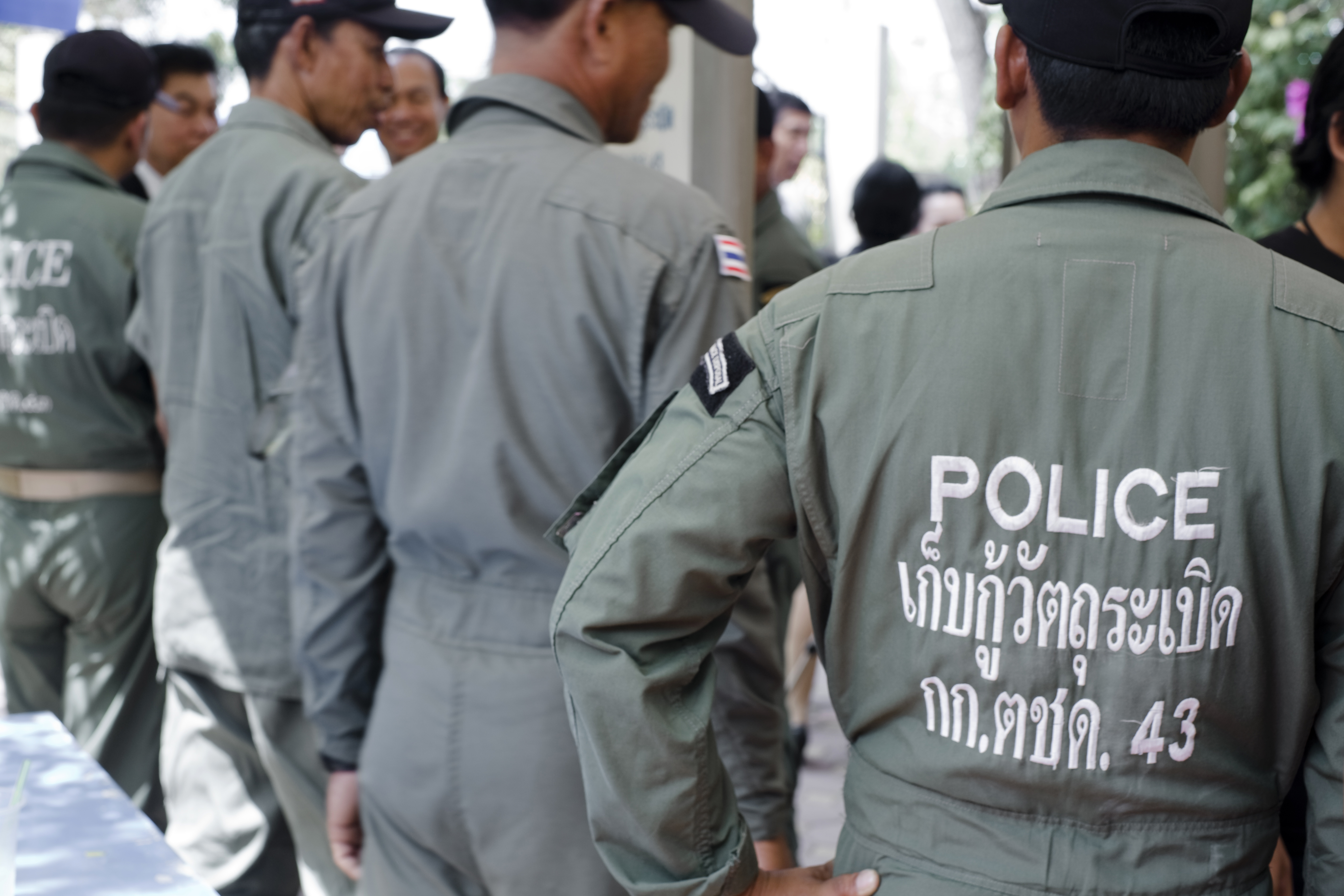
Police EOD uniform

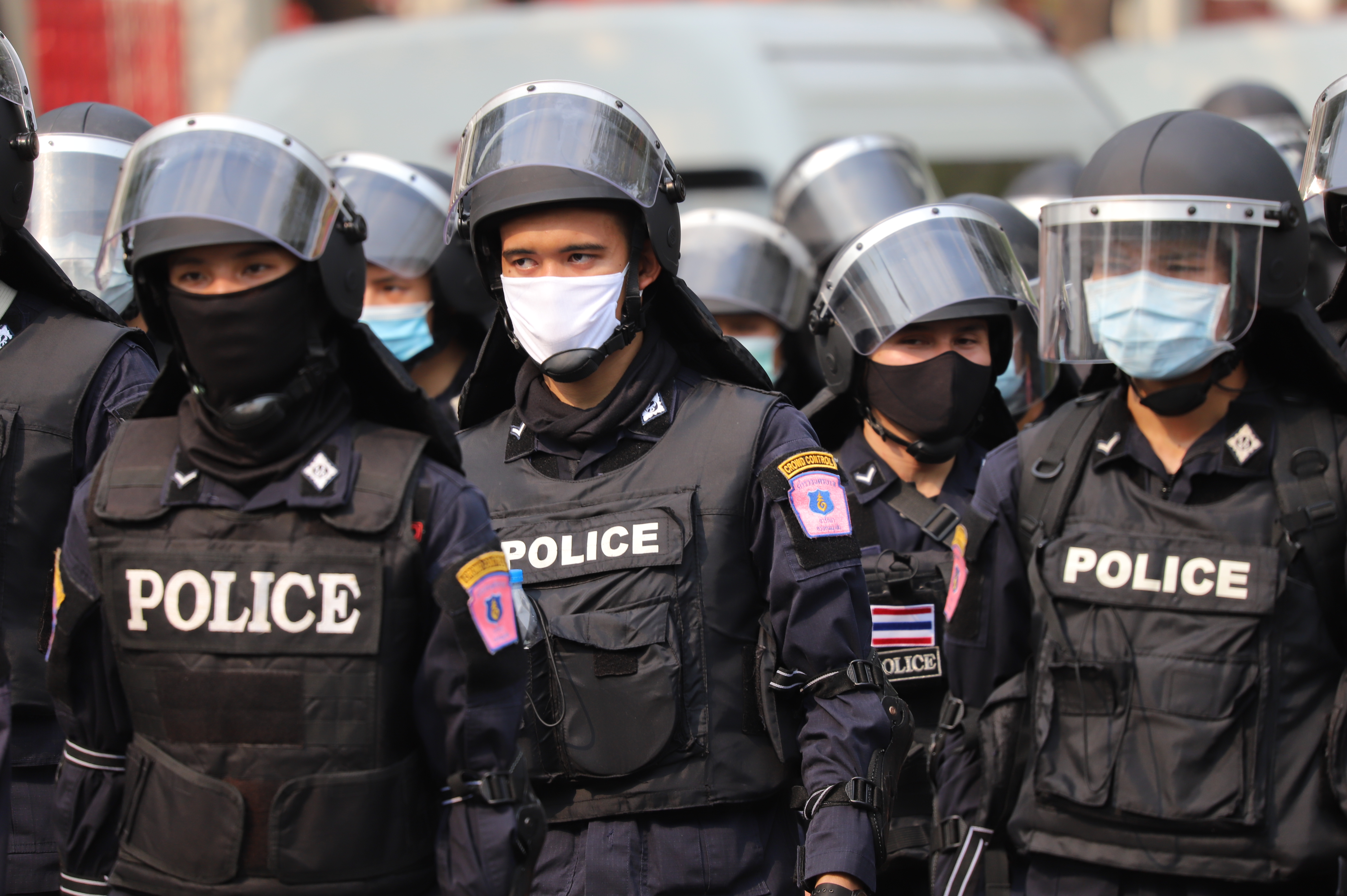
PCCD Riot Control uniform

== Rank structure ==
=== Officers ===
Rank group	General/flag officers			Senior officers			Junior officers
Royal Thai Police
Royal Thai Police	พลตำรวจเอก; Phon Tam Ruad Ek	พลตำรวจโท; Phon Tam Ruad Tho	พลตำรวจตรี Phon Tam Ruad Tri	พันตำรวจเอก; Phan Tam Ruad Ek	พันตำรวจโท; Phan Tam Ruad Tho	พันตำรวจตรี Phan Tam Ruad Tri	ร้อยตำรวจเอก; Roi Tam Ruad Ek	ร้อยตำรวจโท; Roi Tam Ruad Tho	ร้อยตำรวจตรี Roi Tam Ruad Tri	นักเรียนนายร้อยตำรวจ; Nak Rian Nai Roi Tam Ruad

=== Non-commissioned officers ===
Rank group	Senior NCOs			Junior NCOs		Enlisted
Royal Thai Police						No insignia
Royal Thai Police	ดาบตำรวจ; Dap Tamruat	จ่าสิบตำรวจ; Cha Sip Tamruat	สิบตำรวจเอก; Sip Tamruat Ek	สิบตำรวจโท; Sip Tamruat Tho	สิบตำรวจตรี Sip Tamruat Tri	พลตำรวจ; Phon Tamruat

== List of police chiefs ==
This is a list of police chiefs of Thailand (The count begins from the agency's reorganization into the Royal Thai Police, under the command of the Commissioner-General):

- 1998–2000: Pracha Promnok
- 2000–2001: Pornsak Durongkawiboon
- 2001–2004: Sant Sarutanond
- 2004–2007: Kowit Wattana
- 2007–2008: Sereepisuth Temeeyaves
- 2008–2009: Patcharawat Wongsuwan
- 2010–2011: Wichien Podposri
- 2011–2012: Priewpan Damapong
- 2012–2014: Adul Sangsingkeo
- 2014–2015: Somyot Poompanmoung
- 2015–2020: Chakthip Chaijinda
- 2020–2022: Suwat Jangyodsuk
- 2022–2023: Damrongsak Kittiprapas
- 2023–2024: Torsak Sukvimol
- 2024–2026: Kitrat Panphet
- 2026–Present: Samran Nualma

== Controversies ==
=== Police-Army rivalry ===
Clashes between the police and army bureaucracies date back at least as far as 1936 and continue to the present day. The intensity of the infighting has waxed and waned over the years. Since 1947, according to academic Paul Chambers, "...the army has time and again attempted to rein in the police. In many cases, it has resorted to coups." In the 1950s, the rivalry took a comical turn as an arms race developed between the army—supplied by the US military—and the RTP—supplied by the US Central Intelligence Agency (CIA). The vitriol intensified in 2016 when, following the 2014 Thai coup d'état, the junta moved to impose army control over the police for once and for all by giving soldiers power over police.

On 29 March 2016, in a move that the Bangkok Post said will "...will inflict serious and long-term damage...", the NCPO, under a Section 44 order (NCPO Order 13/2559) signed by junta chief Prayut Chan-o-cha, granted to commissioned officers of the Royal Thai Armed Forces broad police powers to suppress and arrest anyone they suspect of criminal activity without a warrant and detain them secretly at almost any location without charge for up to seven days. Bank accounts can be frozen, and documents and property can be seized. Travel can be banned. Automatic immunity for military personnel has been built into the order, and there is no independent oversight or recourse in the event of abuse. The decree basically deputises soldiers as police, but gives greater legal impunity to soldiers than to police. The order came into immediate effect and is still in force as of 2020. The net result is that the military will have more power than the police and less oversight.

The government has stated that the purpose of this order is to enable military officers to render their assistance in an effort to "...suppress organized crimes such as extortion, human trafficking, child and labor abuses, gambling, prostitution, illegal tour guide services, price collusion, and firearms. It neither aims to stifle nor intimidate dissenting voices. Defendants in such cases will go through normal judicial process, with police as the main investigator...trial[s] will be conducted in civilian courts, not military ones. Moreover, this order does not deprive the right of the defendants to file complaints against military officers who have abused their power."

The NCPO said that the reason for its latest order is that there are simply not enough police, in spite of the fact that there are about 230,000 officers in the Royal Thai Police force. They make up about 17 percent of all non-military public servants. This amounts to 344 cops for every 100,000 persons in Thailand, more than twice the ratio in Myanmar and the Philippines, one and a half times that of Japan and Indonesia, and roughly the same proportion as the United States.

In a joint statement released on 5 April 2016, six groups, including Human Rights Watch (HRW), Amnesty International, and the International Commission of Jurists (ICJ), condemned the move.

=== Police corruption ===
On the occasion of the festivities surrounding its 12th anniversary, the Office of the Ombudsman, Thailand reported on its activities since its inception. Chief Ombudsman Panit Nitithanprapas noted that her office had handled nearly 25,000 cases during the period and observed that the Royal Thai Police had been found to be "the most corrupt agency in Thailand". Curiously, Ms Panit's photo does not appear among those of other former ombudsmen on the organisation's website, nor is there any other mention of her.

In the words of Jomdet Trimek, a former police officer, now an academician, "In-depth studies of the causes of...corruption tend to be avoided." Jomdet attributes police corruption to two factors: a centralized police bureaucracy which gives too much power to a few; and very low police salaries. He divides police corruption into three main forms: embezzlement of government funds, coercing bribes from the public, and collection of protection money from illegal business operators and gives examples of each. At the level of constable, this petty thievery is driven by low wages: entry level salaries for police with no university education was 6,800 baht (2012). In June 2015, the Bangkok Post reported that, "Thai police officers are paid around 14,760 baht per month (6,800–8,340 baht for entry level) and have to buy their own guns and even office supplies." He posits that one reason salaries are so low is that the sheer number of officers is staggering, roughly 250,000. This means that an increase of 5,000 baht in every cop's monthly salary would cost the government a politically untenable 15 billion baht annually.

Prime Minister Prayut Chan-o-cha appointed no-nonsense Police-General Somyot Poompanmoung head of the RTP following the coup of May 2014. Somyot, whose declared assets exceed US$11.5 million, has vowed to transfer, arrest, or prosecute all corrupt officers. But, according to Chuwit Kamolvisit, a former massage parlour magnate turned legislator, "police reform" is a never-ending mantra which never produces results. The "cash-for-jobs" culture within the police is too deep to uproot, he says, alleging that low-ranking officers earning just US$460 a month tap the public for bribes, or solicit protection money from dodgy businesses to top up their salaries and buy promotions. "Rank and status is everything in Thailand... when you are a small policeman to go up [sic], you need to have the right boss, and preferably one at a 'golden police station'– near a casino or entertainment venue", he explained.

In a 2008 article, The Economist summed up their assessment succinctly: "In Thailand's most sensational crimes, the prime suspects are often the police."

In August 2015, a post was made on the Sakon Nakhon Police Facebook page, allegedly from a junior officer. Among other observations the post asked, "...Are our meagre salaries enough to support our families? The answer is no. We have to borrow money and get trapped in debt. "So what about the phuyai [bigwigs]? Are they in debt too? Definitely not. They are rich. Why? Because at the end of every month, money from gambling dens, entertainment venues, the sex trade, human trafficking, drugs and whatnot are routinely sent to them." The post was immediately deleted. Then the Facebook page was deleted altogether. The supervisor of the junior policeman in charge of the page said it was all a technical mistake. Someone had hacked into the page to write the message to taint the image of the police force.

In the view of Rangsit University's Associate Professor Police Lieutenant Colonel Krisanaphong Poothakool, "We hear that police reform is ongoing, but in practice, nothing is happening". He added that the country has had a couple of police reform committees, which did not amount to much when their recommendations were ignored.

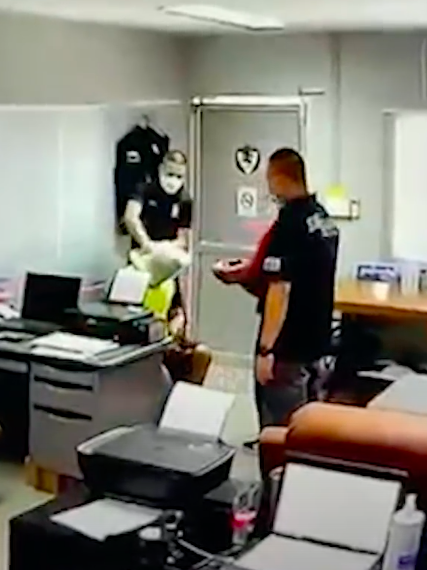
CCTV footage in Thai police station posted online appears to show the suspect being ordered to pay $60,000 to have charges dropped before he is suffocated to death with a plastic bag.

On 5 August 2021, the police assaulted Jeerapong Thanapat, a 24-year-old drug suspect, during an interrogation to force him to reveal hidden methamphetamines and to pay a two million baht or US$60,000 bribe for his release. The video appears to show the director of the Muang Nakhon Sawan Province police station, Thitisan Utthanaphon widely known by the nickname "Jo Ferrari", and other police officers suffocating Thanapat with plastic bags until he collapsed and died. The police reportedly ordered doctors at Sawanpracharak Hospital to write in a medical report that the cause of Jeerapong’s death was methamphetamine overdose.

In 1976, Thai police, military personnel and others, were seen shooting at protesters at Thammasat University. Many were killed and many survivors were abused.

=== Incidents ===
- More than 50 vendors in Ko Samui protested at their local police station on 2 April 2015 to protest rampant bribery among island police officers. The rally was sparked by the arrest of a 42-year-old woman who sold counterfeit purses near Chaweng Beach. According to her, police arrested her employee several hours after they demanded 50,000 baht to overlook the store's violation of trademark laws. The owner, Patcharee Chimthaprasert, 49, said she initially agreed to pay the bribe, but that officers later raised the price to 190,000 baht, which she was unable to afford. Four officers returned several hours later and arrested her employee, Nampueng Moongraiklang, and confiscated 28 bags as evidence, she said. After news of the arrest spread, around 50 vendors from 20 shops near Chaweng beach closed down their stores and staged a rally in front of Bo Phut Police Station. The group filed a complaint that the four police officers extorted bribes from Nampueng and other vendors in the area.
- In 2009, the Thai Police and justice system on the holiday island of Phuket were accused of corruption and over-reaction by tourists visiting the island. In one case an Australian woman was arrested and accused of stealing a bar mat. She spent four nights in jail and had her passport confiscated. Then she faced a wait of another 14 weeks on bail until the next phase of her prosecution. This was despite friends of hers confessing to the police that they had placed the bar mat in the woman's bag as a joke. Eventually the case was resolved after the intervention of the governor of Phuket, Wichai Praisa-nob, after being contacted by Thailand's Ministry of Tourism and the Foreign Ministry. A deal was done under which she would plead guilty, be fined, and then governor Wichai Praisa-nob would pay the fine and give an apology. After this her passport was returned and she was allowed to return to Australia.
- In another case an American couple was arrested upon returning to Thailand and accused of being responsible for burning down a house in which they resided on a previous stay in Phuket. The fire had previously been investigated and found to have been caused by an electrical fault. In order to recover their passports and be allowed to depart Thailand, they had to compensate the house owner and make under the table payments to the judges, the public prosecutor, and everyone down to the bailiffs in the court. This cost them around 45,000 US dollars.
- In 2007 a 15-year-old Danish boy was involved in an insurance fraud when a Chinese couple threw themselves under his Jetboat killing one of them. While the court ruled the incident as an accident, the police detained the boy and held his passport until an amount of DKK300,000 had been paid so the case could be settled within weeks.
- As a condition of being appointed to the National Legislative Council (NLC), prospective members were required to reveal their assets and liabilities. The disclosures by would-be NLC members of their assets shocked many Thais. "Police Chief Somyos Poompanmuang and his wife's net worth was revealed to about 355.8 million baht (roughly $11 million) [sic], raising questions about how a lifelong career in the public service could have made him a millionaire many times over."
- It has been alleged that Thai police profit greatly from "enforcing" music copyright infringement laws. Bars and restaurants in Thailand that play recorded music are required to obtain a licence from a local copyright agency. This is supposed to protect the interests of international artists and record companies. Thailand has more music licensing companies than any other country in the world, making it confusing for business operators to figure out whom to go to if they want to obtain a licence. In cases where fees have not been paid, licensing companies work with the police to collect royalties and sometimes a bit more.
- The discovery in early-May 2015 of two dozen bodies from shallow graves in the mountains of southern Thailand, a discovery that has exposed a network of jungle camps run by traffickers who allegedly held migrants captive while they extorted ransoms from their families, has seemingly galvanized Thailand into action. A total of 33 bodies, believed to be migrants from Myanmar and Bangladesh, have now been exhumed from various jungle camps. The discoveries have embarrassed Thailand, which is already under pressure from the United States and the European Union to crack down on human trafficking both on land and in its fishing fleets. Thai Police chief Gen. Somyot Poompanmoung has moved quickly, arresting the mayor of the district town and relieving 50 police officers of their duties. "If you are...neglecting, or involved with, or supporting or benefiting from human-trafficking networks — your heads will roll," Somyot said.
- Bangkok police chief, Police Lt Gen Sriwarah Rangsipramkul, off-duty, in civilian clothes, and driving a private vehicle, was stopped by police at a drunk driving checkpoint in Bangkok in July 2015. He was asked to take a breathalyzer test. "I rolled down my window and told them I hadn't drunk any alcohol, but the [police] volunteers said, 'you have to take the breathalyzer test,'" Sriwarah recounted. "I told them no five times, but the volunteers wouldn't give in." This enraged the police chief who observed that, "If those volunteers were quality people, and had some wits, they would have realized that I didn't smell of any alcohol. Eventually, I had to tell them who I was and get out of my car and criticize them." Sriwarah said he later encountered a second checkpoint in front of the Criminal Court where a second group of police volunteers again insisted he take a breathalyzer test. He said the incident prompted him to order police officers "to only select quality volunteers for traffic works, so that the people won't be affected." In Thailand, refusing to take breathalyzer test carries a maximum penalty of one year imprisonment. The day following the incidents, Pol Maj Gen Thanapon Techatanon, a senior officer at Traffic Police Division, said he has ordered all traffic officers to familiarize themselves with their superiors to avoid similar incidents in the future. "I have instructed all volunteers and police officers to memorize faces, names, and license plates of their commanders well, so that this mistake will not happen again," Thanapon said.
- In response to the Erawan Shrine bombing on 17 August 2015 which killed 20 and wounded 125 persons, the Thai police on 21 August, initiated "Operation Lock Down the City, Raid the Bandits' Nests," with the objective of "X-raying" potential residences that might hold clues leading to the bomber and his network. On Sunday 23 August, the police held a parade and formal ceremony inaugurating the operation that had begun on 21 August and was due to end the next day. A parade of soldiers and police, complete with mounted cavalry and motorized convoys, marched out of Royal Plaza in the Dusit district. Police reports of the operation claimed a total of 139 people were arrested, three detained, and 4,615 properties searched by the time the operation ended Monday. The majority of suspects were charged with unrelated drug offenses, with a small number taken into custody on weapons charges. Police reports did not indicate how many of those arrested were foreigners. Another three people were arrested for using social media to "spread panic" in connection to the deadly bombing. The operation failed to net any suspects related to the bomb attack.

Following the arrest of one suspect in the bombing, the national police chief, Somyot Poompanmoung, said that he would award the three million baht reward (US$84,000) for tips leading to the arrest of bombing suspects to the Royal Thai Police. "This money should be given to officials who did their job," he said at a news conference as aides brought out stacks of 1,000 baht notes. How the money would be distributed to the police was not made clear. Also unclear was whether the landlady who owned the apartment where the suspect was captured and phoned in her suspicions will receive any money. At a press conference on 28 September 2015 Somyot announced that the police consider the Erewan bombing case solved: the bomb attack was revenge by a gang that was smuggling ethnic Uighurs out of China and had been damaged by a police crackdown. Somyot took the occasion to award police working the case a second tranche of reward money donated by private citizens and was photographed with bundles of 1,000 baht notes.

- The Thai national police chief, Pol Gen Somyot Poompanmuang, at a meeting with 259 immigration police officers at the National Police Office on 7 September 2015, accused the Immigration Bureau of taking millions of baht in bribes daily. The Immigration Bureau falls under the aegis of the RTP. The meeting followed the news last week that a key suspect in the bombing at Erawan Shrine in Bangkok was able to bribe his way past Thai Immigration officials at a border crossing from Thailand to Cambodia and was only arrested when Cambodian officials stopped him. General Somyot, who is retiring at the end of the month, is reported to have said that Immigration officials at Bangkok's two major airports took bribes amounting to at least 1.8 million baht a day. The immigration bureau police commander, Pol Lt-Gen Sakda Choenpakdee, was warned by the national police chief that he would be removed from his post if he fails to rein in unlawful activities.
- Police Lt Col Prakarn Korpsiripat was fired from the RTP and charged with assault after he punched a cashier at a restaurant in Korat where he had been demanding free meals. At the Sor Sunthorn Restaurant on 31 August 2015, Prakarn attacked the cashier who had reported Prakarn's refusal to pay bills totaling 1,400 baht on 29 and 30 August. "Do you know who I am? Why did you report me to my boss? I got reprimanded because of you", restaurant owner Pongpat Bamrungkul described Prakarn as saying to the cashier. The cashier's nose was broken in the assault. "Prakarn's swift sacking was a departure from the usual punishment—transfer to an inactive post—handed down to police officers and other officials implicated in wrongdoing in Thailand." said one news report.
- Laura Witheridge, sister of one of the Ko Tao murder victims, Hannah Witheridge, murdered on Ko Tao, posted a message on her Facebook profile saying that the Thai police are corrupt and that their investigation leading to the conviction of the two Burmese migrants was "bungled". After the message was posted, Pol Gen Chakthip Chaijinda, the Royal Thai Police Chief, threatened to file lawsuits against Laura for defaming the Thai police.
- Police arrested a British tourist in Chiang Mai on the first day of the 2016 Songkran holiday, 13 April, for violating the junta's ban on indecent dress. In a water fight the culprit was topless, wearing only short pants, but no shirt. He was taken into custody, fined 100 baht, then released. Temperatures in Chiang Mai reached 41 °C that day.
- Police captain 1 gave 700,000 baht to his colleague, police captain 2, in order for captain 2 to exercise his influence with a high-ranking police official who could assure captain 1 of a promotion to inspector. When no promotion was forthcoming, captain 1 filed a complaint. When questioned, captain 2 admitted lying to his colleague. He denied knowing any high-ranking police officer with influence. Prime Minister Prayut Chan-o-cha ordered the Royal Thai Police to take action against two officers involved in the scandal.
- The owner of a karaoke bar in the Bang Lamung District of Chonburi Province, filed a complaint with Muang Pattaya police accusing six policemen of illegally detaining her and her employees, attempting to extort money from her and misconduct causing damage to others. The six cops allegedly enticed a server into accepting 2,000 baht for saying she was selling sex to him. The owner and the server were then handcuffed and placed in a police van. Inside the van, the police allegedly asked for a bribe of 30,000 baht in exchange for their freedom. Unfortunately for the cops, the owner telephoned a close relative who knew the national police chief, Chakthip Chaijinda, to seek help. The six officers have been charged with false imprisonment, malfeasance causing injury, and attempted extortion.
- Five senior police officers at the Lat Krabang police station in Bangkok were transferred to inactive posts after soldiers rounded them up in a major gambling den in the district on 18 November 2016. The five arrested included a colonel and four lieutenant colonels. They were the Lat Krabang police superintendent; the deputy superintendent for crime suppression; the deputy superintendent for investigation; the station investigation chief; and the station crime suppression chief.
- In November 2016 Police Lance Corporal Withoon Phetpankan and two accomplices were arrested for stealing five million baht at gunpoint from bank employees reloading an ATM with cash. Under interrogation Withoon confessed to the crime.
- When the National Anti-Corruption Commission (NACC) revealed the asset declarations of new NLA members, it was disclosed that Bangkok police chief Pol Lt Gen Sanit Mahathavorn has received monthly payments of 50,000 baht from alcohol conglomerate Thai Beverage PLC as an adviser to the firm since 2015. Sanit also serves as a member of the city's alcohol control committee, raising conflict of interest issues. Calls for him to step down from his police post were immediate. In January 2017 a Royal Thai Police investigation confirmed that Sanit is not violating police rules by holding an advisory role with a major alcohol conglomerate.
- Thailand's Anti-Money Laundering Office (AMLO) seized assets worth 100 million baht from the ex-police chief of Loei Province and his accomplices. The former police major general allegedly embezzled 229 million baht from 192 police officers he commanded. He is accused of inducing his officers to invest in a "Ponzi-like scheme" and "misappropriating" the money.
- Thai police are keen on crime reenactments. Police say re-enactments help investigators visualize the crime. Legal experts say they violate suspects' rights and should be abolished.
- On 25 April 2025, a Royal Thai Police Viking de Havilland Canada DHC-6 Twin Otter crashed shortly after take-off during a test flight at Hua Hin Airport, killing all six on board.

== See also ==
- Department of Special Investigation
- Border Patrol Police
  - Naresuan 261 Counter-Terrorism Unit
- Corruption in Thailand
- Crime in Thailand
- March of Public Peace Preservation
- Controversy over Police Conduct in Pai
