= March of Public Peace Preservation =

March of the Royal Thai Police

Mat Phithak Santi Rat
- Coat of Arms of Siam (Royal Thai Police)
- English: March of Public Peace Preservation
- Native name: มาร์ชพิทักษ์สันติราษฎร์
- Genre: March
- Text: by Kaeo Atchariyakun
- Language: Thai
- Melody: by Nat Thawarabut

March of Public Peace Preservation
The popular part of the original version of the song, from "ชาติชายเอาไว้ลายตำรวจไทย" ("Chat chai ao wai lai tamruat thai"), performed by Suntharaphon Band.

"March of Public Peace Preservation" (Thai: มาร์ชพิทักษ์สันติราษฎร์; RTGS: Mat Phithak Santi Rat), usually known as the "Thai Police's Honour Song" (Thai: เพลงเกียรติตำรวจของไทย; RTGS: Phleng Kiat Tamruat Khong Thai) from its first verse, and also called the "March of the Royal Thai Police" (Thai: มาร์ชตำรวจไทย; RTGS: Mat Tamruat Thai) or merely "Police March" (Thai: มาร์ชตำรวจ; RTGS: Mat Tamruat), is a well-known Thai patriotic song and march of the Royal Thai Police. The music was composed by Nat Thawarabut (นารถ ถาวรบุตร) and the lyrics, by Kaeo Atchariyakun (แก้ว อัจฉริยกุล), both from the government musical band Suntharaphon (สุนทราภรณ์)

Musician Charin Nanthanakhon (ชรินทร์ นันทนาคร) wrote in the column "Sixth Crossroad of Entertainment" (หกแยกบันเทิง), published in Siam Rath newspaper in 1996, that the march was composed around 1957 upon order of Police General Phao Siyanon (เผ่า ศรียานนท์), Director General of the Police Department at the time being and infamous dictator. Siyanon requested that the song must prevail over the "March of the Royal Thai Army" (มาร์ชกองทัพบก). In the said article, Nanthanakhon also noted that Thawarakun told him playfully: "I didn't want to compose this song at all, Charin. I don't really like police. They always come to arrest me while I'm playing cards."

In spite of Thawarabut's personal feeling towards the Royal Thai Police, he and Atchariyakun completed the work quickly. Siyanon was very impressed by it, especially by the verse "Unavoidable is death, but unceasable is our bravery" ("เกิดมาแล้วต้องตาย ชาติชายเอาไว้ลายตำรวจไทย"), to the extent that he awarded bundles of monies to them together with complimentary letters and his namecards on which he signed and wrote "For you. When you are caught playing cards, show this to the police."

== Lyrics ==
Thai Script	Transliteration (RTGS)	Translation
เกียรติตำรวจของไทย เกียรติวินัยกล้าหาญมั่นคง	Kiat tamruat khong thai kiat winai kla han man khong	Thai Police's honour is the firm disciplines and secure courage.
ต่างซื่อตรง พิทักษ์สันติราษฎร์นั้น	Tang sue trong phithak santi rat nan	Faithful is our work of public peace preservation
ถึงตัวจะตายก็ช่างมัน มิเคยคำนึงถึงชีวัน	Thueng tua cha tai ko chang man mi khoei khamnueng thueng chiwan	which we carry out without caring for our own death or lives.
เข้าประจันเหล่าร้ายเพื่อประชา	Khao prachan lao rai phuea pracha	For our people, we unite in fighting against all malefactors.
ไม่ยอมเป็นมิตร ผู้ผิดกฎหมาย	Mai yom pen mit phu phit kot mai	It is us who shall never mingle with lawbreakers.
ปราบโจรผู้ร้าย กล้าตายเรื่อยมา	Prap chon phu rai kla tai rueai ma	It is us who always sacrifice our lives to combat the wicked.
เนื้อของเราเราเชือด พร้อมทั้งเลือดเราพลี	Nuea khong rao rao chueat phrom thang lueat rao phli	It is our flesh we give up, it is our blood we offer,
เอาชีวีของเราเข้าแลกมา เพื่อให้ประชา ดำรงสุขสถาพรชัย	Oa chiwi khong rao khao laek ma phuea hai pracha damrong suk sathaphon chai	and it is our lives we forsake, just for the eternal happiness of our citizens.
เกิดมาแล้วต้องตาย	Koet ma laeo tong tai	Unavoidable is death,
ชาติชายเอาไว้ลายตำรวจไทย ช่วยประชาไม่ว่าหนไหน	Chat chai ao wai lai tamruat thai chuai pracha mai wa hon nai	but unceasable is our bravery. We are everywhere to serve our people.
เป็นมิตรด้วยดวงจิตสดใส เราอยู่ไหนประชาอุ่นใจทั่วกัน	Pen mit duai duang chit sot sai rao yu nai pracha un chai thua kan	Amicable is our good hearts. Our presence warms up the souls of the public.
ปราบภัยและผองพาลให้เข็ดขาม เราปราบปรามเสริมความสุขสันต์	Prap phai lae phong phan hai khet kham rao prap pram soem khwam suk san	The sinners surely hold us in awe and fear, as they will always be suppressed by us who aim for the felicity of the public.
เหล็กที่แกร่งกล้านั้น เราฝึกกายาทุกวันแข็งกว่าเหล็กนั้น	Lek thi kraeng kla nan rao fuek kaya thuk wan khaeng kwa lek nan	No iron is stronger than our bodies we shape up day by day.
ตำรวจไทย	Tamruat thai	We, Thai Police.

== See also ==
- Royal Thai Police
