= Tourist Police Bureau =

Thai law enforcement agency

Tourist Police Bureau กองบัญชาการตำรวจท่องเที่ยว
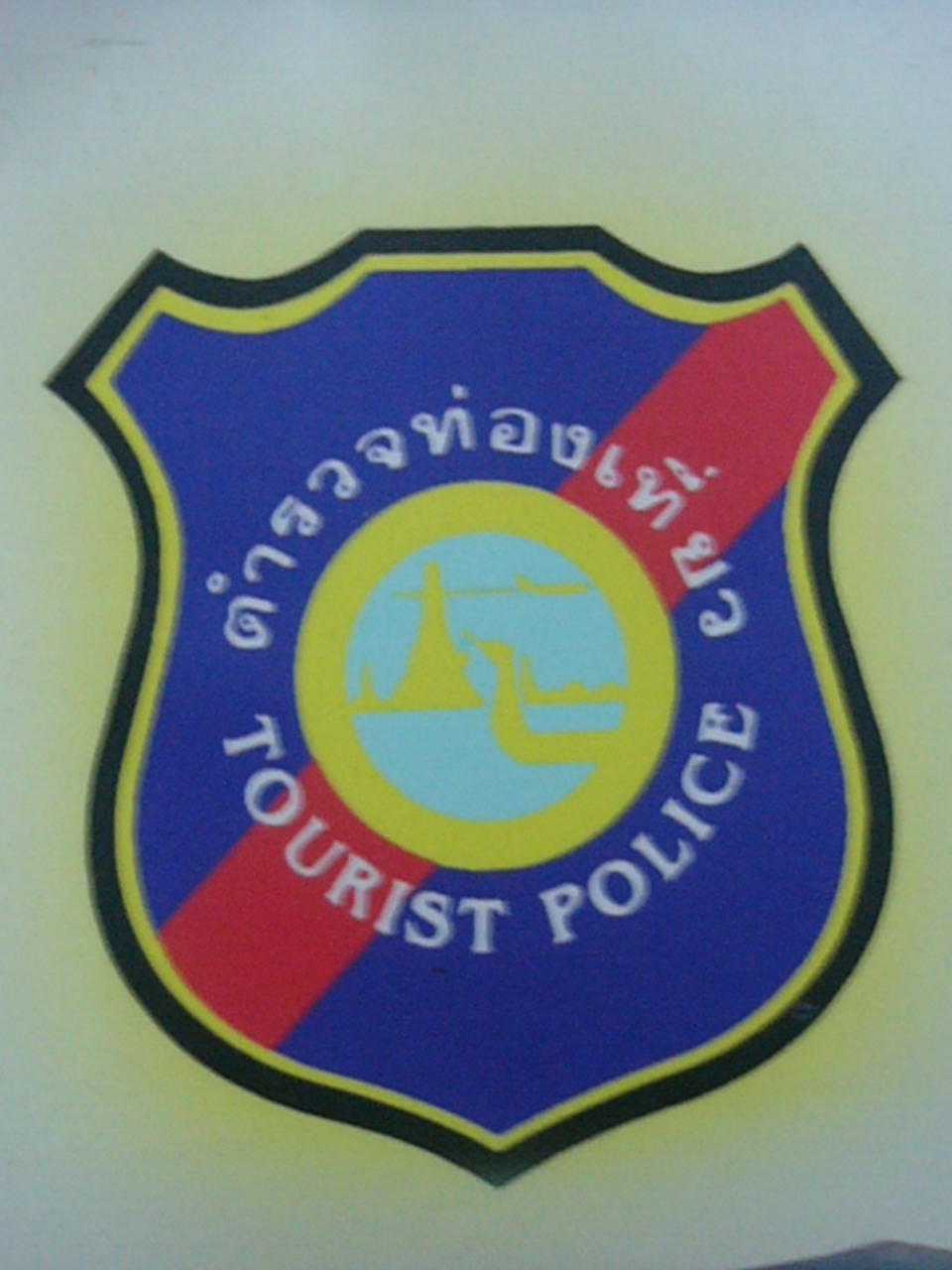
- Official logo
- Abbreviation: TPB

Agency overview
- Formed: 2017

Jurisdictional structure
- National agency: Thailand
- Operations jurisdiction: Thailand
- General nature: Local civilian police

Operational structure
- Headquarters: Bang Phli, Samut Prakan, Thailand
- Police officers: 1,700
- Parent agency: Royal Thai Police

Website
- touristpolice.go.th

The Tourist Police Bureau (Thai: กองบัญชาการตำรวจท่องเที่ยว; also known as Thai Tourist Police) is a national law enforcement agency of Thailand tasked with patrolling and protecting the safety of foreign visitors and the country's tourism and entertainment industries. It is part of the Royal Thai Police.

The bureau was established on 1 September 2017, evolving from the Tourist Police Division formed in 1992, which traces its origins to 1976. Its creation was prompted by the fact that the tourism and entertainment industries in Thailand have seen continuous growth each year, and the number of people arriving in the country has steadily increased. The priorities of the tourist police include cooperation with foreign nationals and the promotion of their security.

== Functions ==
The Tourist Police Bureau has the following powers and responsibilities:

- Plan development strategies, monitor, provide advice to other police departments
- Increase the confidence of tourists in their safety as well as that of their property
- Assist tourists
- Eliminate fraud, protecting the interests of tourists
- If necessary, help tourists cooperate with other police departments
- Contribute to the improvement of the country's tourism image
- Translation services for English, Chinese, German, Japanese, Russian, French, Hindi, and Korean

== See also ==
- Border Patrol Police
