= Arintaraj 26 =

Police tactical unit of Royal Thai Police

- อรินทราช 26 (Thai)
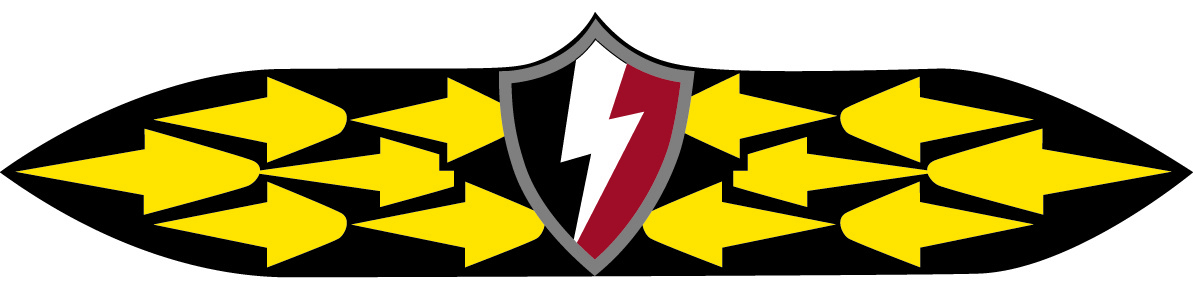
- Anti-terrorism course Badge
- Active: 1983 – present
- Country: Thailand
- Agency: Royal Thai Police
- Type: Police tactical unit
- Operations jurisdiction: National
- Part of: Patrol and Special Operation Division
- Headquarters: Lak Si District, Bangkok, Thailand
- Motto: Never say die

Notables
- Significant operation(s): 1999 Myanmar Embassy siege; Thailand drug war; Nakhon Ratchasima shootings; Siam Paragon shooting

Website
- Official website

Arintaraj 26 (Thai: หน่วยปฏิบัติการพิเศษอรินทราช 26) is the police tactical unit of the Royal Thai Police (RTP).

== History ==
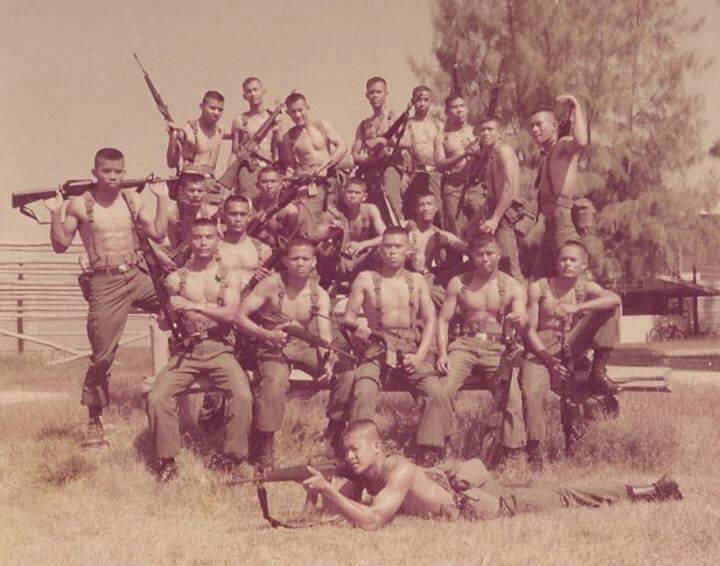
The first establishment of special operation units called "Anti-Hijacker" during the training

In 1977 there were incidents of unrest in Thailand of an unusual nature including serious crimes and international terrorism. Pol.Col. Chumpon Attasat, Superintendent of the Riot Control and Suppression Sub-Division, established a special operation unit called "Anti-Hijacker". He selected police officers within the unit who were physically, mentally, and intellectually ready to the specified qualifications to attend the training in order to cater to missions of an international nature. During the training, there was no financial support, not even for the meals of the attendees. After Pol.Col.Chumpon Attasit was assigned to take a position in a different unit, the special operation had changed.

In 1983 there was an international terrorism incident and insurgency in Thailand, particularly in Bangkok. Pol.Maj.General Thip Asawarak, Commander of Patrol and Special Operations Division at that time, resurrected the special operation unit. He requested the Royal Thai Police department for the authorization of an international training plan for the special operation unit similar to GSG9 in Germany. Later in 1984, the Royal Thai Police department ordered the establishment of a special operation unit within the Metropolitan Police Bureau, using the name of special operation unit "Arintaraj 26".

== Operations ==
The company has been involved in a number of high-profile criminal cases, including:

1. Burmese student takeover of the Myanmar Embassy in Bangkok on 1–2 October 1999 (2542).
2. Takeover of the Ratchaburi Hospital in Ratchaburi Province on 24–25 January 2000 (2543).
3. Release of hostages from the Karen-Burmese rebellion at Samut Sakhon Province Prison on 22–23 November 2000 (2543).
4. Nakhon Ratchasima shootings on 8–9 February 2020 (2563), ( the operation was co-operated with other police units such as Naresuan 261 Counter-Terrorism Unit)

These four major successful operations were all under the control of Arintaraj 26. In all these situations, the mission was accomplished and the hostages were rescued.

== Recruitment, selection and training ==
Members of the Royal Thai police with at least two years of service, Freshmen who graduated from Police Academy and Freshmen who graduated from Police Cadet Academy can apply for the selection process of the Arintaraj 26.

The test has the following:

- Medical examination
- Psychological examination
- Physical tests, which includes 1.6 km run, 100 m swim, sit up, pull-ups, push-ups, and obstacle course
- Final interview

The brutal 18 week training period includes eight weeks of basic training and ten weeks of special training. The identity of Arintaraj 26 units is classified as Royal Thai Police's final answer. Further training often involves co-operation with other allied counter-terrorism units such as Royal Thai Navy SEALs, RTAF Security Force Regiment, 90th Task Force, Naresuan 261. Only one in the third pass the training course.

== Equipment ==
Arintaraj 26 units are often equipped with specialized firearms including the Glock 17 pistols, Heckler & Koch MP5 submachine guns, M16 assault rifles, M4A1, Sig MPX, Remington 870 breaching shotguns, riot control agents, stun grenades, and sniper rifles such as HK PSG1, Remington M24. They also use specialized equipment including heavy body armor, ballistic shields, breaching tools, armored vehicles, advanced night vision optics, and motion detectors determine the positions of hostages or hostage takers inside to enclosed structures.
