= Suwat Jangyodsuk =

Thai police general

Police General Suwat Jangyodsuk
- สุวัฒน์ แจ้งยอดสุข
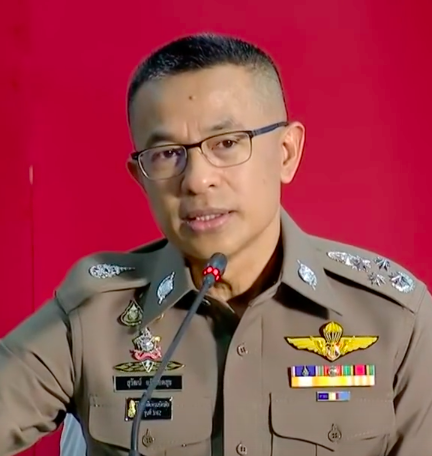

Member of the Senate of Thailand
- Ex officio 6 December 2020 – 30 September 2022
- Preceded by: Chakthip Chaijinda
- Succeeded by: Damrongsak Kittiprapas

12th Commissioner-General of the Royal Thai Police
- In office 1 October 2020 – 30 September 2022
- Preceded by: Chakthip Chaijinda
- Succeeded by: Damrongsak Kittiprapas

Personal details
- Born: 20 December 1961 (age 64) Chachoengsao, Thailand
- Education: Royal Thai Police Cadet Academy
- Profession: Policeman

Suwat Jangyodsuk (Thai: สุวัฒน์ แจ้งยอดสุข; born 20 December 1961) is a Thai retired police officer who served as the 12th Commissioner-General of the Royal Thai Police.

== Early life and education ==
Suwat Jangyodsuk was born in Khlong Khuean District, Chachoengsao Province on 20 December 1961. Suwat completed his lower secondary education at Saint Louis School, Chachoengsao (science-mathematics program). He later attended Triam Udom Suksa School for one year before transferring to the Armed Forces Academies Preparatory School (AFAPS).

He graduated from AFAPS Class 20, same class with the current Vice-Chamberlain of the Bureau of the Royal Household and former Commander in Chief of the Royal Thai Army, Apirat Kongsompong and former Commissioner-General of the Royal Thai Police, Chakthip Chaijinda.

== Career ==
Suwat began his career at the Royal Thai Police as a deputy chief investigator at Hua Mak police station in Bangkok from 1983 to 1987. His very early investigation dealt with a car robbery gang in Bangkok. He was transferred to become a personal secretary of former police chief Sant Sarutanond. He worked at the investigation section of the Metropolitan Police Division 1 for almost five years and was then promoted to the chief police investigator at Samut Prakan police station. Several years later, in 2013, he became a deputy chief of the Metropolitan Police Bureau in the intelligence department. He was admired as a skilled detective.

In 2020, The National Police Policy Board, headed by Prime Minister Prayut Chan-o-cha, agreed unanimously to promote Suwat to Commissioner-General of the Royal Thai Police.
