= Naresuan 261 =

- นเรศวร 261 (Thai)
- PARU Patch worn by Naresuan 261
- Active: 18 December 1984 – present
- Country: Thailand
- Agency: Royal Thai Police
- Type: Police tactical unit
- Operations jurisdiction: National
- Part of: Police Aerial Reinforcement Unit Border Patrol Police; Counter Terrorist Operations Center Royal Thai Armed Forces Headquarters
- Headquarters: Cha-am District, Phetchaburi Province, Thailand

Structure
- size: 6 Companies

Notables
- Significant operation(s): Cold War; Communist insurgency in Thailand; Communist insurgency in Malaysia; Vietnamese border raids in Thailand; Thai–Laotian Border War; Internal conflict in Myanmar(Humanitarian/Anti-Drug); 1999 Myanmar Embassy siege; Operation Border Post 9631 along the Thai-Burmese border in 1999; Takeover of the Ratchaburi Hospital in Ratchaburi Province on 24–25 January 2000; War on drugs; Southern Insurgency; Tham Luang cave rescue; Nakhon Ratchasima shootings

Website
- Naresuan 261 Official Site

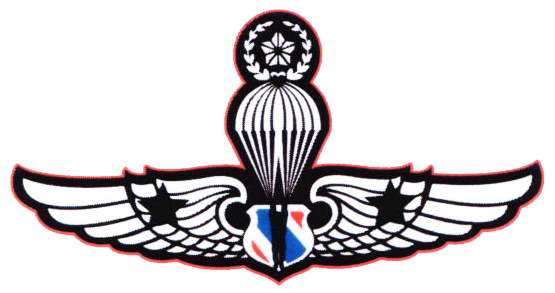
Jump wings of Naresuan 261

Sub-Division 3, Border Patrol Police Aerial Reinforcement Unit (Thai: กองกำกับการ 3 กองบังคับการสนับสนุนทางอากาศ) also known as Special Operation Unit Naresuan 261 (Thai: หน่วยปฏิบัติการพิเศษ นเรศวร 261), Naresuan 261 (Thai: นเรศวร 261) is a police tactical unit, falling under the Border Patrol Police (BPP), Royal Thai Police (RTP).

== History ==
Special Operations Unit "Naresuan 261" was set up in 1983, Buddhist year 2526, by a Thai cabinet resolution. The resolution, dated 1 February 2526 (1983), was a major policy decision designed to provide a force for counterterrorism and hostage rescue efforts. It was named in honor of King Naresuan the Great.

The Royal Thai Police were given orders to set up training for a special division to accomplish these goals. The unit was founded in 1984, Buddhist year 2527, and placed under the control and responsibility of the Thai Border Patrol Police Police Aerial Reinforcement Unit (PARU).

In late 1986, a royal decree, proclamation number 14, reorganized the Royal Thai Police and Naraesuan 261 was assigned as company 4 under the Border Patrol Police's Aerial Reinforcement Unit.

In 2005, a royal decree, proclamation raised company 4 to the level of Sub-Division 3, Border Patrol Police Aerial Reinforcement Unit.

Naresuan 261 has responsibility for anti-irregular military, apprehension of armed and dangerous criminals, counterterrorism and hostage rescue crisis management, executive protection, high-risk tactical law enforcement situations, providing security in areas at risk of attack or terrorism, resulting criminal cases, and support search and rescue efforts for disaster victims. The company also plays an important role as executive protection for the king, the queen, and other members of the royal family when they travel. They also train female operatives as executive escorts for Princess Siridhorn when she visits Border Patrol Police schools around Thailand. The company acts as escorts for foreign dignitaries and heads of state visiting Thailand.

== Organization Management ==
Naresuan 261 consists of a 3 special operation companies, Rescue Company, explosive ordnance disposal (EOD) company and one security company

== Training ==
Initial training was performed by members of the Royal Thai Police Department. Teams are divided up into units of five persons following the model set by Germany's GSG-9. Teams are trained in close-quarters battle, commando tactics, martial arts, operation of a variety of vehicles, waterborne operations, and sniping.

After initial training, groups pass on their experiences to other members of the company. The company will also assign members to train in foreign countries and bring the knowledge back to Thailand to further help train the company. Standard training is broken up into five parts:

1. International counterterrorism training consisting of 24 weeks of training for new police privates.

2. International counterterrorism training consisting of six weeks of training for police on active duty as well as one week of anti-terrorism planning.

3. Explosive ordnance disposal (EOD) training consisting of 12 weeks of training.

4. Sniper/counter-sniper training consisting of four weeks of training for those assigned to sniper positions.

5. Electronics proficiency training consisting of 12 weeks of training for those assigned to the duty of electronics proficiency officer.

The company takes part in cross-training with special operations divisions of the Royal Thai military as well as training with their counterparts in various units in Australia, South Africa, Germany, and the United States.

== Operations ==
The company has been involved in a number of high-profile criminal cases, including:

1. Burmese student takeover of the Myanmar Embassy in Bangkok on 1–2 October 1999 (2542).

2. Takeover of the Ratchaburi Hospital in Ratchaburi Province on 24–25 January 2000 (2543).

3. Release of hostages from the Karen-Burmese rebellion at Samut Sakhon Province Prison on 22–23 November 2000 (2543).

These three major successful operations were all under the control of Naresuan 261. In all these situations, the mission was accomplished and the hostages were rescued.

== See also ==
- Border Patrol Police
- List of Special Response Units
- List of special forces units
