= List of prosecuted lèse majesté cases in Thailand =

This is the list of prosecuted lèse majesté cases in Thailand.

== Notable cases ==
Date	Person(s)	Notes about person(s)	Description of the crime and legal proceedings
1984	Sulak Sivaraksa		He and other social activists allegedly criticized the king and were charged; Sulak was eventually acquitted.
1995	Lech Tomasz Kisielewicz	French national of Polish descent	Made an insulting remark about a Thai princess aboard a Thai Airways flight. He was jailed under lèse majesté for two weeks after his flight landed in Bangkok.
May 2008	Jonathan Head	BBC correspondent and FCCT vice-president	Accused of lèse majesté three times: 1. authoring articles that referred to alleged support for the People's Alliance for Democracy (PAD) by members of the royal family, 2. writing that Crown Prince Vajiralongkorn might find it difficult to "fill his father's shoes", and 3. allowing a picture of a politician to be placed above a picture of Bhumibol on a BBC web page.; He was not deported, but left Thailand at the end of his three-year BBC assignment.
Sep 2008	Harry Nicolaides	From Melbourne, Australia	Wrote an offending passage in his self-published book Verisimilitude. The book, which sold a mere seven copies, mentioned the "romantic entanglements and intrigues" of royalty. He was arrested upon arriving at Bangkok's international airport and charged with lèse majesté. After pleading guilty, he was sentenced to three years in jail but then pardoned by the king after spending a month in jail, released, and deported.
Apr 2009	Daranee "Da Torpedo" Chanchoengsilpakul	UDD activist	Initially sentenced to 18 years in prison (six years for each three comments she made) without suspension for "intending to insult" Bhumibol and Sirikit at a political protest. She did not actually mention the monarchs in her speech (she said the "ruling class"), however, the court ruled that the prosecution "brought evidence that makes it possible to interpret that the defendant meant the King and Queen Sirikit." In 2011 the appeals court voided the sentence given by the criminal court. A retrial sentenced her to 15 years, five years per each offence, in prison. On 27 August 2016, Darunee was released after requesting a royal pardon and serving more than eight years in prison.
Apr 2010	Wipas Raksakulthai	Thai businessman	A post to his Facebook account allegedly insulting Bhumibol. The arrest was reportedly the first lèse majesté charge against a Thai Facebook user. In response, Amnesty International named Wipas Thailand's first prisoner of conscience in nearly three decades.
May 2011	Joe Gordon	American freedom of expression activist, born in Thailand as Lerpong Wichaikhammat	Posted a link on his blog to a banned book about the ailing King Bhumibol. Also was reportedly suspected of translating, from English into Thai, portions of The King Never Smiles, an unauthorized biography of King Bhumibol Adulyadej, and posting them online, along with articles he wrote that allegedly defamed the royal family. "I want President Obama and Hillary Clinton to intervene on my behalf," he is quoted. After being denied bail eight times, a shackled–and–handcuffed Gordon said in court on 10 October, "I'm not fighting in the case. I'm pleading guilty, sirs." On 8 December 2011 a court in Thailand sentenced him to two and a half years in prison (halved from five years due to pleading guilty). On 10 July 2012, Gordon received a pardon from the king and was released from jail.
Mar 2012	Akachai Hongkangwan		Sold VCDs containing a segment of the Australian Broadcasting Corporation Foreign Correspondent series. Australian foreign correspondent Eric Campbell and ABC's entire Bangkok bureau had been banned from entering Thailand after they aired an investigation of Bhumibol's role in the military's violent 2010 crackdown on protesters.
May 2012	"Uncle SMS"	Real name Ampon Tangnoppakul — Thai: อำพล ตั้งนพกุล — known familiarly as "Ah Kong" "อากง"	Accused of sending four short message service (SMS) messages from his cell phones. The messages were deemed offensive to the King and Queen of Thailand. He was denied bail on eight occasions and died from liver cancer in a prison hospital at the age of 61 while serving a 20–year prison sentence. Amnesty International named Ampon Tangnoppakul a prisoner of conscience in 2011.
Jan 2013	Somyot Prueksakasemsuk	Magazine editor and activist	Sentenced to ten years in prison, convicted of publishing two articles under a pseudonym that made negative references to the crown in his now-defunct magazine Voice of Taksin. Amnesty International has designated Somyot Prueksakasemsuk a prisoner of conscience.
Sep 2013	Yuthapoom Martnok		Accused of lèse majesté by his brother, and "has been jailed for a year in a Bangkok prison" while waiting for a court ruling, according to a Bangkok Post article. He was acquitted and released one day after the article ran.
Oct 2013	Sondhi Limthongkul	Founder of the People's Alliance for Democracy (PAD)	Quoted remarks made by an opponent protesting the 2008 resumption of PAD protests. The appeals court in so doing reversed a lower court acquittal (Thailand has no bar to double jeopardy) handed down on 26 September 2012. The lèse majesté had resulted from Sondhi's having quoted remarks made by Daranee Chanchoengsilpakul. Sondhi's 2012 acquittal upheld prosecution for whatever words Sondhi had quoted, but for much less than "18 years in prison without suspension." Sondhi was sentenced to two years imprisonment, then released after posting 500,000 baht (US$15,935) in bail.
2014	Nithiwat Wannasiri	Musician	Member and lead singer of the punk rock group Faiyen, which became known for writing and performing songs that mocked the lèse majesté law as well as corrupt officials and the elites. Following the 2014 Thai coup d'état Wannasiri was accused of lèse majesté and subsequently charged under article 112. He was forced into exile and continues to campaign against lèse majesté.
Aug 2014	Jaran Ditapichai	Academic, political activist and former human rights commissioner	The three were accused of defaming the king because of their role in a political play performed during the 40th anniversary of the 14 October 1973 student uprising in October 2013. Jaran Ditapichai was charged because he was the head organizer of the event where the play, "The Wolf Pride", was performed. Pornthip Munkong was charged because she performed in the play and Patiwat Saraiyaem was charged for staging the play. The UN Working Group on Arbitrary Detention (UNWGAD) declared their detention arbitrary and against provisions which guarantee the fundamental right to liberty, the right to a fair trial, and the right to freedom of opinion and expression. On 23 February 2015, Pornthip Munkong and Patiwat Saraiyaem received a sentence of 2 years and 6 months each. They were released from prison in August 2016. Jaran Ditapichai remains in exile in France where the government of France has granted him a political refugee status.
Aug 2014	Pornthip "Golf Prakai Fai" Munkong	Activist	
Aug 2014	Patiwat Saraiyaem	Khon Kaen University student	
2014	Somsak Jeamteerasakul	Academic	Somsak Jeamteerasakul was a former history lecturer at Thammasat University known for his criticism of the Thai monarchy and the lèse majesté law. He was a critic of the 2014 military coup and was accused of being "a mentally ill academic [who] is intent on overthrowing the institution," by the leader of the junta Prayut Chan-o-cha. He avoided arrest by going into hiding and later escaping to France where he was granted political asylum. In April 2017 the Thai authorities declared it illegal to communicate or exchange information with Somsak Jeamteerasakul on the internet.
Dec 2014	Nopporn Suppipat	Thai Businessman	Nopporn Suppipat is founder and former CEO of Wind Energy Holding and in 2014 was listed 31st on Forbes Asia's ranking of Thailand's 50 Richest with a net worth of US$800 million. After the May 2014 coup he was accused of lèse majesté during a corruption investigation into family members of Princess Srirasmi Suwadee. Supippat fled to France and was granted political asylum.
January 2015	Thanet Anantawong		He was charged with lèse majesté "inciting disorder and computer crimes. He was among a group of student activists who attempted to visit Rajabhakti Park in Hua Hin early last month to hold a protest, but were intercepted by military officers".
Dec 2015	Thanakorn Siripaiboon	Thai factory worker	Faces multiple charges including that of insulting the king's adopted dog Tongdaeng. He was detained on 8 December 2015 and kept in an undisclosed location prompting fears of his forced disappearance. Thai military junta did not detail the precise insult made towards the animal. He faces up to 37 years in prison. He was granted bail on 8 March 2016; the bail was set at half a million baht.
May 2016	Patnaree Chankij	Mother of a prominent pro-democracy activist	Charged with lèse majesté for failing to criticize or take action on personal Facebook messages that were sent to her account by her son's friend Burin Intin. According to a statement made by her lawyer, "[Police] Officers interpreted refusal to reprimand something is equal to agreeing with it". On 8 May 2016 media said that Chankij was released on bail.
Jun 2016	Thanat "Tom Dundee" Thanawatcharanon	Singer	Arrested in 2014 for a speech he made at a Red Shirt rally in 2013. After being detained for two years without bail, he was sentenced on 1 June 2016 to 7.5 years in prison. A second sentencing on 11 July 2016 by a military court over another speech given in 2013 added three years and four months to his sentence. The two lèse majesté convictions total 10 years and 10 months imprisonment. He was released in 2019 after having been in prison for five years.
Dec 2016	Jatupat Boonpattararaksa (Pai Dao Din)	Thai student and activist	Political activist Jatupat Boonpattararaksa was arrested after sharing a profile of King Maha Vajiralongkorn, published by BBC Thai on this personal Facebook page.
Apr 2017	Sulak Sivaraksa	Academic	Sulak was charged for his remark during an academic forum at Thammasat University in October 2014 doubting the existence of an elephant duel between King Naresuan of Ayutthaya and Crown Prince Mingyi Swa of Taungoo Burma in the 16th century. In January 2018, it is revealed that military attorney decided not to sue him after he petitioned to the King, and he advised the government to drop the case.
Jan 2018	Murhyatee Masoh	Unemployed Thai-Malay Muslim from Yala Province	Murhyatee, a blind woman, was found guilty of violating Article 112 of the constitution in two separate Facebook posts in October 2016. She used a voice-assisted application which reads text out loud. The woman, under arrest since November 2016, pleaded guilty. The source of the defamatory content which Murhyatee re-posted is unclear. "The court said they are sympathetic to her [because she's blind] but said the law is the law."
Jan 2018	Chanoknan Ruamsap	Pro-democracy activist	On January 16, Chanoknan received a summons to a police station two days later, to answer to charges of lèse-majesté following a media article she shared on Facebook. She chose to leave the country rather than risk imprisonment.
Dec 2018	Wanchaleom Jamneanphol	YouTube personality	Charged with lèse-majesté and computer crimes for describing online a dress designed by Princess Sirivannavari Nariratana as ugly. The dress was worn by the Thai contestant in the 2018 Miss Universe pageant held in Bangkok. The charges were levied by Thai millionaire and would-be politician, Kitjanut Chaiyosburana. He explained his action, saying, "I cannot accept that a well-known individual in the online world expressed negative opinions that affect the country's reputation,..." The princess is the only daughter of King Vajiralongkorn and his former consort, Sujarinee Vivacharawongse.
Mar 2022	Tantawan "Tawan" Tuatulanon	Student	She was initially arrested while conducting a poll on the lèse-majesté law and then released without charges. After live-streaming a procession and asking questions about why protestors were being cleared from the route, she was arrested again and charged. She was initially granted bail, which was then revoked. Tuatulanon and another activist, Orawan “Bam” Phuphong, went on hunger strike for 52 days in order to protest the lack of bail for lèse-majesté defendants; 13 out of 16 were granted bail during the hunger strike.

== See also ==
- Lèse-majesté in Thailand
