= Prachatai =

Thai online newspaper

- ประชาไท
- Formation: June 2004; 22 years ago
- Type: Nonprofit
- Legal status: Nonprofit foundation (The Foundation for Community Educational Media)
- Location: Bangkok, Thailand
- Official languages: Thai; English
- General Manager: Pongpan Chumjai
- Editor-in-chief: Tewarit Maneechay
- Website: prachataienglish.com

Prachatai (Thai: ประชาไท, lit. 'Free People') is an independent non-profit online newspaper in Thailand. Focusing on news from and commentary on NGOs, social movements, and human rights issues, the website became an alternative source for social and political news in a country where many media outlets are state backed, including military-run, or for-profit. Its current editor-in-chief is Tewarit Maneechay, with Pongpan Chumjai serving as general manager. The site publishes mainly in Thai, with selected articles translated to English.

== History and objectives ==
The newspaper was established in June 2004 by a group of concerned Thais who included a senior member of the Press Council of Thailand, a well-known lecturer in journalism, two members of the Senate of Thailand, a number of senior journalists, and a number of Thai NGO leaders. On September 6, 2004, Prachatai began daily online publication. In January 2006, it registered as a non-profit foundation, named The Foundation for Community Educational Media. It has four stated objectives:

1. To provide the Thai public with access to reliable news and information relevant to developing and strengthening the democratic functions of Thai civil society.
2. To focus news coverage on the problems, concerns, activities and accomplishments of local communities and civil society movements and organisations.
3. To strive for freedom and independence of Thai news media.
4. To promote active public participation in Thai news media.

Prachatai, together with other selected Thai independent media (Budpage, Same Sky, Midnight University, Open, and Questionmark), was collectively curated as "Thai Bookazine" to participate in The Magazines project of the Documenta 12 exhibition.

== Charges ==
In 2011, its then general manager, Chiranuch Premchaiporn, won the Courage in Journalism award from International Women's Media Foundation. Chiranuch, a well-known free speech advocate, has been subject to arrest and detention based on lèse majesté accusations for not removing what authorities deem offensive material quickly enough from the website. In this matter, she has received international acclaim and support. On 30 May 2012, the Criminal Court delivered its verdict in Black Case No. 1667/2553, in which Chiranuch faced ten alleged violations of the 2007 Computer Crimes Act, being found guilty of one charge and being sentenced to one year in prison and a 30,000 baht fine, subsequently reduced to a suspended sentence of eight months and a 20,000 baht fine. Chiranuch appealed to both the Appeals Court and the Supreme Court, both of which upheld the sentence (the latter in 2015), establishing the precedent that Internet intermediaries are liable for lèse majesté content in Thailand.

In July 2016, one of Prachatai's reporters was arrested under the provisions of the 2016 Referendum Act, which effectively banned campaigning to reject the 2016 Thai constitutional referendum, with three other people. The four were released on bail. Following the arrests, Prachatai’s offices were searched by the police, who were reportedly investigating whether the online newspaper had published material violating the Referendum Act. Nothing was found, and in 2018, the four were found to be not guilty of violating the Act.

== Person of the year ==
Prachatai website has published special content since 2016.

Year	Person	Ref.
2016	Naritsarawan Keawnopparat	
2017	Social Healthcare Interest Group	
2018	RAP Against Dictatorship	
2019	Political Refugee Group; Faiyen; Somsak Jeamteerasakul; Jaran Ditapichai; Surachai Danwattananusorn	
2020	Tiwagorn Withiton	
2021	Worawan Sae-Aung "Pa Pao"	
