= Andrew MacGregor Marshall =

Scottish journalist and author

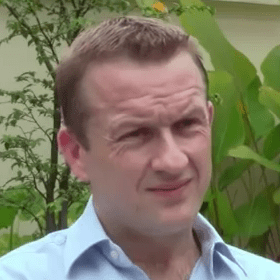
- Marshall in 2011
- Born: 25 March 1971 (age 55); Edinburgh, Scotland
- Education: Strathallan School
- Alma mater: University of Cambridge (MA)
- Occupation: Journalist
- Spouse: Noppawan Marshall
- Children: 1

Andrew MacGregor Marshall (born 25 March 1971) is a UK journalist and author, focusing mainly on human rights, conflict, politics, and crime, mostly in Asia and the Middle East. A noted critic of the Thai monarchy and government, in June 2011, Marshall resigned from Reuters in controversial circumstances after the news agency refused to publish exclusive stories he was writing on the Thai monarchy. His 2014 book A Kingdom in Crisis was banned in Thailand and a prominent Thai royalist made a formal complaint to police accusing Marshall of several crimes including lèse majesté.

== Career ==
Marshall was a correspondent for Reuters for 17 years, covering political upheaval in Thailand and the conflicts in Iraq, Afghanistan and Pakistan. In 2000, he was named Reuters' Deputy Bureau Chief in Bangkok. He was Reuters' Baghdad bureau chief from 2003 to 2005 as a violent insurgency gripped Iraq, and was Reuters' managing editor for the Middle East from 2006 to 2008. From 2008 he was based in Singapore as a political risk analyst and emerging markets editor. He left Reuters in June 2011 when the agency refused to publish a set of articles about Thailand's monarchy he authored based on his analysis of leaked US diplomatic cables.

== #thaistory controversy ==
In June 2011 Marshall announced he had resigned from Reuters to publish a set of stories about Thailand that the news agency had refused to run. Later the same month he published the material himself. Entitled "Thailand's Moment of Truth", his study analysed the role of the monarchy in Thai politics and included references to hundreds of leaked US diplomatic cables. Thailand has harsh lèse majesté laws that criminalise criticism of the royal family, and journalists covering the country have tended to follow a policy of self-censorship, refraining from any comment on the monarchy that could be deemed critical. Marshall's study, usually referred to by its Twitter hashtag #thaistory, used evidence from the cables to argue the monarchy played a central political role in Thailand which had never been properly reported.

In an article for the Independent newspaper, Marshall noted that his publication of #thaistory meant he may be imprisoned if he returned to Thailand, and that he understood Reuters' refusal to publish the material given the risks to its staff and business in Thailand if it offended the monarchy. Reuters gave a different explanation, telling The Times and The Independent that the story didn't "work" in the format in which it was delivered, that they had questions regarding length, sourcing, objectivity and legal issues, and that Marshall "was not participating in the normal editing process."

Marshall's #thaistory generated significant comment and debate. Nicholas Farrelly, a fellow at the Australian National University, wrote that the initial instalments published "have quickly become online sensations", adding "his insights will reverberate in Thai analytical circles for many years to come". Joshua Kurlantzick, Southeast Asia fellow at the Council of Foreign Relations, said Marshall's work was "perhaps the biggest bombshell of reportage on Thailand in decades". Graeme Dobell of the Lowy Institute for International Policy described #thaistory as "journalism of the highest order" and Pavin Chachavalpongpun of the Institute of South East Asian Studies wrote: "Marshall has undoubtedly helped push the boundaries much further as one looks at the present state of the Thai monarchy." Richard Lloyd Parry, Asia editor for The Times newspaper, said #thaistory was "a profound study, beyond mere journalism".

The Thai authorities have a policy of not officially acknowledging the existence of controversial WikiLeaks cables, and so did not comment on #thaistory, but Thanong Khanthong, managing editor of the generally pro-establishment Nation newspaper, claimed it was part of an international plot to destabilise Thailand.

== Death of King Ananda Mahidol ==
Marshall has done extensive research into the mysterious shooting of Ananda Mahidol, King Rama VIII of Thailand, on 9 June 1946. He argues that the evidence overwhelmingly suggests Bhumibol Adulyadej killed his brother, probably accidentally, and this was covered up to enable Bhumibol to become king.

== A Kingdom in Crisis ==
Marshall's book A Kingdom in Crisis was published by Zed Books in October 2014. Reviewing the book for the New Mandala website, Patrick Jory, senior lecturer in Southeast Asian History at the University of Queensland, wrote: "Marshall, a former Reuters journalist, has for some years now been the foremost commentator on the taboo subject of the role of the monarchy in Thailand’s politics... Marshall has written a provocative, clearly argued, accessible, timely, and convincing book."

On 11 November 2014 Thai police chief General Somyot Poompanmuang announced that the book had been banned in Thailand. Violators of the ban were liable to a prison term of up to three years and/or a fine of up to 60,000 baht. "The content insults, defames and threatens Thailand's monarchy," Somyot said in a statement. "The book is a danger to national security and peaceful and orderly society."

== Accusations of lèse majesté and sedition ==
On 9 December 2014, Thai royalist Wanthongchai Chamnankit filed a formal complaint with police, accusing Marshall of breaking Article 112 of the Thai criminal code, the lèse majesté law. Wanthongchai also accused Marshall of violating Article 116, a law prohibiting sedition, with a maximum penalty of death, and Article 14 of the Computer Crime Act.

== Detention of wife by Thai police ==
On 22 July 2016, more than 20 police raided the family home of Marshall's wife Noppawan "Ploy" Bunluesilp in Bangkok while she was visiting Thailand, seizing her phones and computer equipment. She was taken to the headquarters of the Crime Suppression Division in Bangkok along with the couple's three-year-old son, and her father. Noppawan was interrogated for several hours and denied access to a lawyer. Her detention generated widespread international attention and she was released the same day. She subsequently left Thailand.

== Death of King Bhumibol ==
Marshall reported the death of Thai King Bhumibol Adulyadej on 13 October 2016, several hours before the official announcement by the royal palace. He was the first journalist in the world to break the news.

== Thai junta bans online contact ==
On 13 April 2017, the ruling Thai junta issued a statement forbidding Thais from any online interaction with Marshall and two other prominent overseas commentators on Thai politics and the monarchy, professors Somsak Jeamteerasakul and Pavin Chachavalpongpun. The Ministry of Digital Economy said Thais should not follow, contact or share content from the trio on the internet or social media. Marshall responded by saying: “I believe Thais should be free to read information from all sources and make up their own mind about what they believe.”

== Opposition to British Royal Family ==
In addition to being a noted critic of the Thai Royal Family, MacGregor Marshall is also known to be a notoriously outspoken critic of the British royal family, having repeatedly demonstrated his dissatisfaction with members of the British monarchy (in particular, the current monarch of the United Kingdom, King Charles III) and consequently demonstrating support for Scottish independence.
