= Ampon Tangnoppakul =

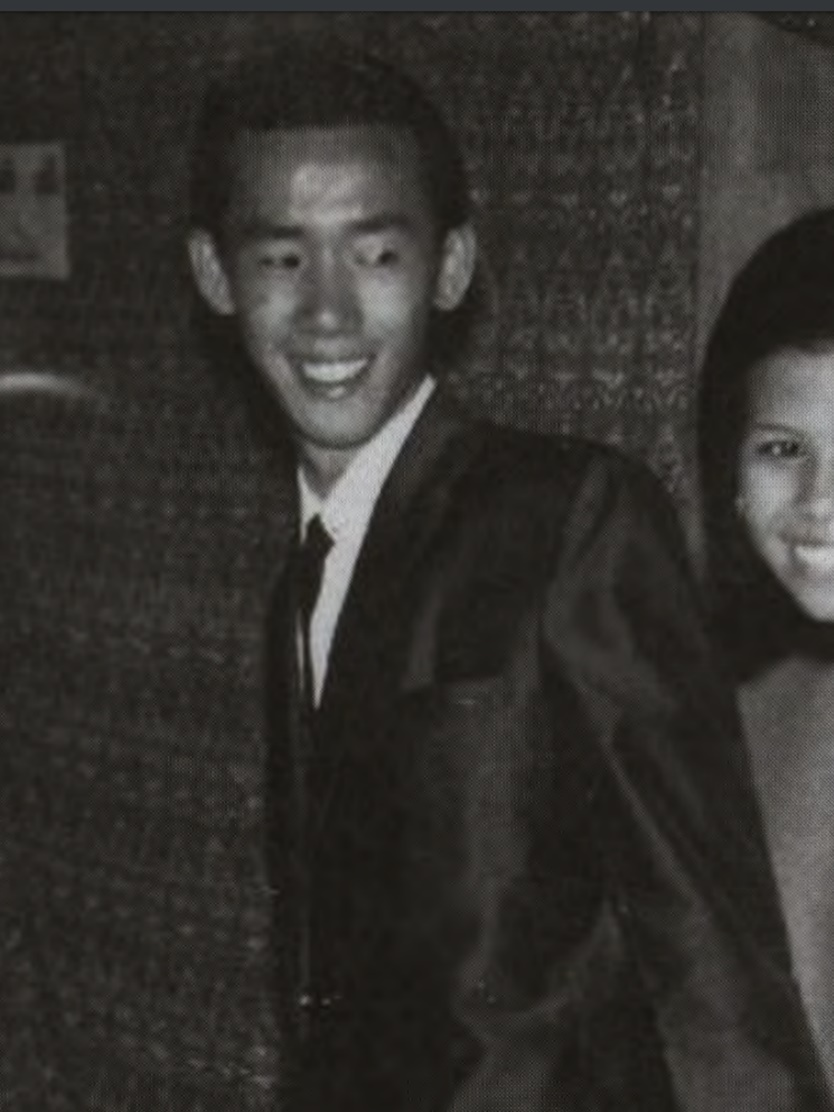
- Born: January 1, 1948
- Died: May 8, 2012 (aged 64); Klong Prem Central Prison, Bangkok, Thailand
- Other name: Uncle SMS
- Occupation: goods container driver
- Known for: imprisonment for lèse majesté, death in prison

Ampon Tangnoppakul (Thai: อำพล ตั้งนพกุล; RTGS: Amphon Tangnopphakun; 1 January 1948 – 8 May 2012), commonly known in Thai as Ah Kong (อากง; meaning 'grandpa') or in English as Uncle SMS, was a Thai national accused of sending four Short Message Service (SMS) messages from his cell phones to Somkiat Khrongwatthanasuk, secretary of then Prime Minister Abhisit Vejjajiva that were deemed offensive to the King and Queen of Thailand, as proscribed by section 112 of the Criminal Code of Thailand and the law on computer-related offences. Having been found guilty of four charges in November 2011, he was sentenced by the Criminal Court to four consecutive five-year terms, for a total of twenty years in prison. His death in prison during the first year of his sentence attracted national and international criticism, prompting a national discussion of Thailand's lèse majesté law.

== Background ==
Ampon married Rosmalin Tangnoppakul (รสมาลิน ตั้งนพกุล; RTGS: Rotmalin Tangnopphakun). The two have two daughters, Porawan Chotphichit and Piyamat Tangnoppakul, and a certain number of sons. Ampon once earned his livelihood as a goods container driver. As his age and illness grew, especially following his mouth cancer surgery in 2007, he quit such work and cohabited with his wife in a rented house in Amphoe Mueang Samut Prakan, Changwat Samut Prakan, supporting himself by the money provided by his children and maintaining his grandchildren in return.

== "Uncles SMS" Case ==
=== Inquiry ===
In mid-2010, Somkiat Khrongwattanasuk made a denunciation before the National Police Headquarters' Technology-Related Offence Suppression Division (TROSD) that four short messages were sent to his mobile phone by an unknown person and their contents were likely to constitute an offence. The TROSD then set up an investigation team.

From the investigation, the team learned that Ampon owned the number from which the messages were sent, and successfully applied to the Criminal Court for a warrant of arrest on 29 July. Ampon was arrested at his rented house in Samut Prakan, and police seized three of his mobile phones together with their supplementary equipment. The Criminal Court placed Ampon in detention at the Khlong Prem Prison and turned down his relatives' request for provisional release. However, Ampon's relatives lodged a successful appeal with the Court of Appeal. Ampon was detained for sixty-three days prior to the release granted by the Court of Appeal on 4 October 2010.

Police Lieutenant General Tha-ngai Prasajaksatru, chief of the police team arresting Ampon, remarked that in the course of the inquiry, Ampon pleaded not guilty, but admitted that the exhibited mobile phones were his. He stated that he had not used them for a long time and did not know how to send a text message. Tha-ngai also said that he believes Ampon was a member of the United Front for Democracy Against Dictatorship (UDD) or Red Shirts, and that the Internal Security Operations Command has blacklisted him.

=== Prosecution ===
On 18 January 2011, a public prosecutor filed a charge against Ampon before the Criminal Court. The charge stated that Ampon, using his mobile phone, sent four different short messages to Somkiat at different times.

The Criminal Court admitted the case for trial and assigned judges Chanathip Mueanphawong and Phatthrawan Songkamphon to the responsible chamber. The chamber examined evidence on 21 March and placed Ampon under detention again in the course of the trial, citing the reason that "The act against the King, Queen and Heir Apparent is of serious nature affecting the sentiment of all Thais." The defendant's relatives and counsel objected that the defendant was not likely to abscond but always complied with the court orders. They also argued that as he was ill, the detention would be detrimental to his health and ability to set up a defence, and would be contrary to the Constitution under which the right to provisional release is recognised. The objection was denied by the Criminal Court, as were all of the subsequent requests for his provisional release.

Pavin Chachavalpongpun, a Thai academic in Singapore, in 2011, launched a nationwide campaign to free Ampon and to inform the public of the impact caused by Article 112. His campaign is "Fearlessness," by writing the name of "Akong" on his palm. Soon after, many Thais joined his campaign.

=== Trial and adjudication ===
The Criminal Court held four hearings on 23, 27, 28 and 30 September 2011. The first three hearings covered the prosecution evidence, and the fourth, the defence evidence.

The public prosecutor introduced as witnesses Somkiat Khrongwatthanasuk, the police officers in charge of the investigation, two daughters of Ampon, and two mobile use information collectors from DTAC and True Move. The witnesses testified that Somkiat received four messages from an unknown number and then made a denunciation to the police, and that the police officers, having held an examination with the participation of the mobile phone service providers, believed that the number in question was owned by Ampon and its International Mobile Equipment Identity could not be falsified. In presenting his evidence, Ampon, still pleading not guilty, introduced his counsel and relatives as witnesses to prove his innocence as well as his loyalty and respect to the King and Queen. His lawyers focused on technical issues in his defence, demonstrating how a false phone number could have been created in Ampon's name.

The Criminal Court found that:

"The prosecutor could not expressly prove that the defendant sent the messages as mentioned in the charge ... but the grounds for his ability to introduce any eyewitness are the serious nature of the offence in question to such an extent that a person intending to commit it would conduct the commission in absence of others ... It needs to derive the guilt from the circumstantial evidence introduced by the prosecutor ... And every circumstance evidence adduced by the prosecutor could firmly, proximately and reasonably indicate all circumstances giving rise to an absolute belief that during the periods of time aforementioned, the defendant sent the four messages as accused ... Since the contents of the said messages are an insult and expression of malice aforethought towards Their Majesties the King and Queen, are defaming them in a manner likely to negatively affect their grace and bring them into hatred and contempt ... and are of false nature in contradiction to the fact already learnt by the people throughout the nation that Their Majesties are full of mercy ... the defendant is thus guilty as charged."

The Court held that the four messages constituted four acts concurrently in violation of the Criminal Code and the Act on Computer-Related Offences, BE 2550 (2007), and delivered a sentence only on a basis of the Criminal Code, the most serious law, that the Defendant was to be imprisoned for five years on account of each act (twenty years in total).

The judgment was pronounced on 23 November, through a videoconferencing system from the Criminal Court to the Khlong Prem Prison where Ampon was detained, as the 2011 flood prevented his personal appearance. The court took eighteen minutes to pronounce the judgment. Since the pronouncing could not be heard clearly, the penal officers sitting by the side of Ampon subsequently asked a court officer through the monitor what the court had said. The court officer merely answered: "Uncle, you'll be inside for twenty years."

The Guardian reported that Ampon's twenty-year sentence was the longest yet given under section 112.

=== Appeal ===
Ampon filed an appeal against the judgment of the Criminal Court, and was detained pending appeal. He applied for a provisional release, but the Court of Appeal refused his application. He then lodged a final appeal with the Supreme Court of Justice against the Court of Appeal's order of refusal, but his final appeal was also turned down. Seeing no hope, he also gave up the appeal against the Criminal Court's judgment and sought a royal pardon instead, causing the judgment to be final in process. The Criminal Court issued a warrant of finality on 3 April 2012, at which time Ampon was subjected to imprisonment as sentenced. In the month preceding Ampon's death, he wrote from prison that he missed his wife and grandchildren but had "high hopes that I will get freedom soon".

=== Reactions ===
The ASEAN Intergovernmental Commission on Human Rights commented that the Criminal Code, section 112, and the law on computer-related offences were used in the name of the security protection to violate the freedom of expression, and called for a provisional release of Ampon in the course of the trial. The Delegation of the European Union to Thailand expressed its "deep concern" and urged the Thai authorities to end discrimination.

The conviction led Amnesty International to designate Ampon a prisoner of conscience, and to denounce his arrest as a "blow to freedom of expression". Human Rights Watch described Ampon's conviction as demonstrating "the misuse by successive Thai governments of laws intended to protect the monarchy" and called for the laws "be amended to prevent unnecessary restrictions on freedom of expression".

The Midnight University accused the Thai judiciary of failure to give Ampon a fair trial, saying that a "section 112" defendant always meets with obstructions from the beginning to the end of a case, especially when asking for a provisional release.

In ThaiPBS's show Reaching an Answer on the topic "Uncle SMS and Section 112", aired on 12 December 2011, Phanat Thatsaniyanon, former dean of the Faculty of Law, Thammasat University and former Attorney General, said he was uncertain if justice could be done in the trial of "section 112" cases, especially when the proceedings are always carried out in curia. In the same show, commentator Nidhi Eoseewong stated that he was deeply moved by a long sentence imposed on an aged and ailing man, and remarked that "Justice does not float in the sky, but it does lie in the heart of the society in each period of time ... Many social movements in the 'Uncle SMS' case point out the change of Thai society's attitude on justice. A standard of justice which was once held by us has now been changed. In Ayutthaya period, Uncle SMS would be punished by having his mouth stuffed with ripe coconuts."

In his article "Uncle SMS has no compassion for his own crime", Sitthisak Wanachaikit, Court of Justice spokesperson, wrote that "According to the charge, the Defendant was sixty one. He was not too old to the extent requiring the care and support from another ... not as old as a grandpa ... No one would want to see a person, whose inborn trait is evil and who intends harm towards society, the chief institution of the Nation and the revered monarchy, getting off scot-free." As to why the court did not grant the benefit of the doubt to Ampon, Sitthisak answered: "When the public prosecutor who institutes the proceedings can exercise his burden of proof to the extent of bringing to light the evil intent of the defendant ... the defendant needs to be punished according to the gravity of the case." The spokesperson also described the acts for which Ampon was convicted as the "thin end of the wedge."

== Death ==
=== Cause of death ===
In the morning of 8 May 2012, Ampon was found dead in the Khlong Prem Prison. The cause of death was initially unknown. Police Colonel Suchat Wong-a-nanchai, Director General of the Corrections Department, revealed that a penal officer informed him that Ampon had complained about a pain in his stomach on 3 May, and the officer delivered Ampon to the Penal Hospital the following day.

According to Thailand's Code of Criminal Procedure, Ampon's death, occurring whilst the deceased was in official custody, was an unnatural death and required an inquest. Thida Thavornseth, UDD leader, raised doubt in his death and took part in a postmortem inquiry held by the Ministry of Justice's Central Institute of Forensic Science (CIFS). She also requested the International Committee of the Red Cross to examine the standard of the Penal Hospital. On 9 May, the CIFS ruled that Ampon had died of cancer.

The police's postmortem inquiry was also held on 8 May by the Institute of Forensic Medicine, Police General Hospital. A forensic team headed by Police Major General Narongsak Saowakhon was in charge of the inquiry, in which several members of the Pheu Thai Party (PTP) also participated as observers. The next day, the Institute's spokesperson stated that the cause of Ampon's death was lung cancer which spread throughout his body and brought about heart failure.

On 16 May, a parliamentary committee stated its findings that Amphon's death could have been prevented if he had been given treatment and granted a release. A CIFS coroner confirmed that Ampon's liver cancer was still in a treatable stage at the time of his death, as it had not progressed to its final stage and did not extend over his heart.

=== Funeral protest ===
On 9 May, Ampon's widow and children, accompanied by a number of UDD members and Chulalongkorn University (CU) lecturers, received Ampon's body from the CIFS and held a procession from there to the Criminal Court, carrying his coffin through downtown Bangkok. A funeral ceremony took place in front of the Criminal Court for one night, amidst a great number of the police officers stationed by the Court. Rosmalin stated that the goals of the protest were to reform the lèse majesté law and "allowing all of those who are sick to receive medical treatment".

The next day, the funeral procession proceeded from the Court to the National Assembly and to Wat Dan Samrong in Samut Prakan. Rosmalin announced that the funeral would continue for a full week. UDD members in other areas also held mourning ceremonies at the same time. Another rite was held in a Bangkok prison hospital on 7 August, 99 days after Ampon's death.

=== Reactions ===
The international human rights community was critical of the Thai government following Ampon's death, with an Amnesty International spokesman stated that Ampon "had come to represent the enormous degree of injustice that was this lèse majesté law". The International Federation for Human Rights (FIDH) released a statement offering condolences on Ampon's death and criticizing the conditions of Thai detention centers as falling "far short of the UN Standard Minimum Rules for the Treatment of Prisoners". The FIDH also called for an independent investigation into the circumstances of Ampon's death, a call echoed by the Asian Human Rights Commission (AHRC). The AHRC also called for the abolition of lèse majesté as a criminal offence, stating: "In the years since the coup on September 19, 2006, many people have paid a high price for alleged disloyalty to the monarchy, with sentences whose length is comparable to those for persons convicted of drug trafficking and murder. The death in custody of Amphon Tangnoppakul indicates that the price of loyalty is too high: a man has paid for four SMS messages with his life, and his family has paid with the loss of their husband, father and grandfather."

On 10 May, Sunai Chunlaphongsathon, PTP member of the House of Representatives, remarked that the death of Ampon should be an occasion to begin public discussion about fair trials in the "section 112" cases, and expressed his concerns over other accused in the similar cases. Despite the calls for reform by the red shirts, traditionally supporters of Prime Minister Yingluck Shinawatra, she insisted that her government would not seek to reform the law. On 16 May, the red shirts rallied before her offices in the Government House to call on her again to change the law.

Actress Bongkot Kongmalai expressed her happiness over Ampon's death in her Facebook status, describing it was his pāpa, generating a wave of criticism and causing her to delete the post. On 13 May, whilst traveling to Pattaya to make a film, the actress attracted a great number of UDD protesters, causing her team to cancel the filming and leave the city urgently.

In the renewed scrutiny on the case, Ampon's defence team faced heavy criticism in online forums, with some users accusing them of having deliberately lost the case to bring new attention to the lèse majesté law. Poonsuk Poonsukcharoen, one of Ampon's four lawyers, replied that the team had done their best, but acknowledged that their inexperience in lèse majesté law may have been a factor in Ampon's conviction.

U.K. MP Kerry McCarthy, a Shadow Minister for Foreign Affairs, raised the issue of Ampon's death in the British Parliament, asking what action David Cameron's government intended to take in response.

== See also ==
- Censorship in Thailand
