= Peaceful Society Promotion Act =

Parliament of Thailand
- Long title: Act on Promoting a Peaceful Society
- Territorial extent: Thailand
- Passed: 8 July 2026
- Enacted: 23 August 2026
- Signed: 18 August 2026
- Commenced: 24 August 2026
- Status: In force

The Act on Promoting a Peaceful Society, also known as the Peaceful Society Promotion Act (Thai: พระราชบัญญัติสร้างเสริมสังคมสันติสุข) is a 2026 Thai law offering political amnesty for specific political actions committed between 1 January 2005 and 16 July 2025. The act be Thailand's 24th political amnesty law since the first amnesty decree issued after the Siamese revolution of 1932.

== Provisions ==
The bill excludes amnesty for those convicted of violating Article 112 of Thailand's criminal code, the country's lese majeste law.

== Legislative history ==
On 30 June 2026, the Senate passed the bill 103 to 3, with 22 abstentions.

On 7 July 2026, the Senate version of the bill was endorsed by the governing coalition.

On 8 July 2026, the House of Representatives passed the bill 306 to 141, with two abstentions. It is now pending royal assent.

On August 18, 2026, Vajiralongkorn signed in this bill into law, which was published in the Royal Gazette on August 23, 2026 and came into effect on August 24, 2026.
