= Pimsiri Petchnamrob =

Thai human rights activist

- พิมพ์สิริ เพชรน้ำรอบ
- Born: Bangkok, Thailand
- Citizenship: Thailand
- Occupation: Human rights activist
- Organization: Article 19
- Criminal charges: Defamation of the royal family
- Criminal penalty: Guilty
- Criminal status: 32 months in prison

Pimsiri "Mook" Petchnamrob (Thai: พิมพ์สิริ "มุก" เพชรน้ำรอบ) is a Thai human rights activist. She is known for her work promoting the right to freedom of speech in Thailand, for which she has experienced harassment from Thai authorities.

== Biography ==
Petchnamrob was born and raised in Bangkok. She serves as the Thailand programme officer for Article 19, a British human rights organisation that works to defend and promote freedom of speech and freedom of information around the world. In addition, as of 2025, Petchnamrob is the director of the board of Amnesty International Thailand, the Thai section of the international non-governmental organisation Amnesty International, which focuses on the promotion and protection of human rights.

In November 2021, Petchnamrob was charged under section 112 of the Criminal Code of Thailand, known as the lèse-majesté which makes it illegal to defame, insult or threaten the King of Thailand or the Thai royal family. This was in relation to a speech she had given in November 2020 at a demonstration in front of the 11th Infantry Regiment, the Thai King's Guard, in Bangkok, in which she cited a 2017 statement by the United Nations Special Rapporteur on the promotion and protection of the right to freedom of opinion and expression, in which lèse-majesté was criticised as being incompatible with democratic values. Authorities stated that the speech had defamed Vajiralongkorn, the King of Thailand. In total, Petchnamrob was charged with 10 offences, including lèse-majesté, sedition, and breaching COVID-19 restrictions. Petchnamrob was granted temporary bail on the basis that she refrained from criticising the monarchy and that she agreed not to travel abroad without the court's permission.

In 2023 and 2024, Petchnamrob was prevented from travelling abroad, including from attending a session of the United Nations Human Rights Council in Geneva; clear justifications for the refusals were not given.

Petchnamrob's trial began in June 2025 at Bangkok Criminal Court and was scheduled to last until August. Petchnamrob in her testimony denied advocating for the reform of the monarchy or making personal remarks about any members of the Thai royal family, stating she had only quoted comments from the Special Rapporteur that stated that lèse-majesté was not compatible with democracy. The Clooney Foundation for Justice urged the Bangkok Criminal Court to protect freedom of expression in Petchnamrob's trial, stating that Petchnamrob's calls for institutional reform accounted to protected speech. It accused the prosecution of failing to prove how Petchnamrob's speech posed a "specific and imminent threat" to national security. The United Nations expressed concern over the proceedings and called on the Thai government to drop the charges against her. The International Federation for Human Rights stated that criminal proceedings against Petchnamrob appeared to be solely related to her "legitimate human rights activities". 12 civil society organisations issued a joint statement expressing concern at the proceedings against Petchnamrob.

On 20 February 2026, Petchnamrob was found guilty of lèse-majesté and sentenced to 32 months in prison.
