= Tantawan Tuatulanon =

Thai social activist

Tantawan Tuatulanon (Thai: ทานตะวัน ตัวตุลานนท์), nicknamed Tawan (Thai: ตะวัน); is a Thai student and activist who is facing legal proceedings in Thailand for violating the country's lèse-majesté laws.

== Background ==
Tantawan was studying Marketing in Singapore. After the COVID-19 pandemic, she returned to Thailand and started working with several pro-democracy groups such as WeVolunteer, Draconis Revolution and Thaluwang.

== Arrest and detention ==
She was initially arrested in March 2022, after conducting a survey on opinions of royal motorcades and livestreaming one. She was initially granted bail under the conditions that she stayed away from the royal family and didn't post more about them on social media. On January 16, 2023, she and another activist, Orawan Phuphong, appeared in front of the supreme court, poured red paint over themselves and announced they were going to revoke their bail as a protest in favor of other lèse-majesté defendants who were not granted bail.

== Hunger strike ==
On January 18, 2023, Tantawan and another activist who was charged with lèse-majesté, Orawan "Bam" Phuphong, began a hunger strike by refusing all food and water, in order to protest the lack of bail given to other lèse-majesté defendants. They were given bail again and moved to the hospital, where they started to take water but continued to refuse food. A group of protestors marched on the Criminal Court of Thailand to protest the detention of lèse-majesté defendants. One of the marchers collapsed and died during the protest. In February, they were moved out of the hospital and continued their hunger strike in front of the Supreme Court.

After 52 days, Tantawan and Orawan stopped their hunger strike. Many activists were granted bail during the hunger strike. Only 3 of the original 16 protestors remained in jail at the end of the hunger strike and conditions for those under house arrest were loosened as well. Media reported that they decided "it would be better to preserve their strength and get better to fight for the long haul."

== Response ==
=== In Thailand ===
Monarchy reform activist Arnon Nampa held a rally in support of the hunger strikers, despite his own bail conditions. Two Thai opposition parties, Pheu Thai and Move Forward Party, said that they "respect" the activists and echoed their calls for the release of political prisoners and justice system reform. An online magazine, The People, had to temporarily shut down after it faced backlash from giving awards to Tantawan and Orawan.

=== International ===
The International Federation for Human Rights and World Organization Against Torture put out a statement "expressing ... deepest concern about the arbitrary detention and judicial harassment of Tantawan Tuatulanon." Human Rights Watch called for her release as well. Freedom Now filed a petition at the Working Group on Arbitrary Detention on her case.

== Later Activism and Statements ==
Following the 2023 Thai general election and the 9th anniversary of the 2014 Thai coup d'état, she said that, "Everyone [who helped the NCPO and Gen Prayut stay in power] has to go to jail. They must pay for what they did to the people." She and Orawan attended a rally of the Move Forward Party and were allowed onstage while Paetongtarn Shinawatra made comments about freedom of expression. Tantawan, along with 8 others, was arrested again after protesting the detention of a 15-year-old lèse-majesté defendant at a police station. All 9 were granted bail.
