= Tiwagorn Withiton =

Thai political and human rights activist

- ทิวากร วิถีตน
- Born: 31 October 1975 (age 50); Khon Kaen, Thailand
- Education: KMUTNB (B.Eng.)
- Occupations: Activist; farmer; engineer
- Known for: Monarchy reform activist

Tiwagorn Withiton (Thai: ทิวากร วิถีตน; RTGS: Thiwakorn Withiton; born 31 October 1975) is a Thai political and human rights activist, farmer and engineer. He is one of the first political activists in Thailand that openly challenge the country's taboo, harsh punishment under the lèse-majesté law, by publishing a photo of him wearing a printed 'I lost faith in the Monarchy' T-shirt.

He has encouraged people to wear it because it stated a sentiment, not defamation. It went viral on social media, after which Internal Security Operations Command forcibly admitted him to a psychiatric hospital. It was one of the causes of the 2020–2021 Thai protests' second wave protests, the largest demonstration since the 2014 Thai coup d'état, demanding he be released from involuntary hospitalization. His movement is regarded as one of the biggest turning points of Thailand's political landscape, which earned him the honor of person of the year 2020 by Prachatai.

== Early life ==
Tiwagorn was born in the village of Don Chang in Mueang Khon Kaen District of Khon Kaen Province, northeastern Thailand. In 1993, he attended an electrical engineering program in communication engineering and computer science at King Mongkut's University of Technology North Bangkok, and graduated in 1998 to become an engineer in an IT company in Bangkok.

== 2006 coup and 2014 coup ==
In 2007, having concluded the 2006 Thai coup d'état had not improved the country, he emerged as one of the protesters in the Saturday Anti-Dictator Group movement led by Suchart Nakbangsai. As political resistance grew, he became involved in an online group 'Ratchadamnoen Camfrog', which evolved from the 'Pantip Ratchadamnoen' discussion web board.

He participated in the 2010 Thai political protests as well as during the 2010 Thai military crackdown, after which he continued going out to protest with the Red Sunday Group led by Sombat Boongam-anong. He created an online group talk 'RedTalk' (later 'FreedomTalk') for Red Shirts supporters.

At the end of 2010, he announced his exit from the Red Shirts group to his friends, one of whom was a well-known activist, Kritsuda Khunasen. He quit his job, engaged in charity by building a takraw court under the Rama 7 bridge. He moved from Bangkok to Khon Kean after the 2014 Thai coup d'état and discontinued his activism, focusing instead on farming in his home.

== T-Shirt protest ==
=== Viral ===
I have worn this shirt, even if I die, I would not regret. Losing faith isn’t the same as wanting to overthrow the monarchy. It’s a feeling inside your heart similar to falling out of love or losing one’s trust … There is no way to force people who ‘lost faith’ to regain their faith using violence.

— Tiwagorn, 2020

On 16 June 2020, he posted a photo on his Facebook account that went viral online. Before that, he proposed the idea of using the slogan 'I lost faith in the Monarchy' in 'The Royalists Marketplace', the monarchy-satire Facebook group by Pavin Chachavalpongpun. Many users were concerned for lese majeste law which had been used broadly and unpredictably. His photo received more than 4,000 comments from both sides of the issue. He re-entered activism again after Wanchalearm, a Thai political activist, was abducted by armed men in Phnom Penh on 4 June 2020.

On 19 June and 4 July, a Internal Security Operations Command officer and a local police officer came to his house to discuss with him.

On 5 July 2020, he showed the contract which signed him off of his family in his Facebook account for safety issues.

=== Political abuse of psychiatry ===
On 9 July 2020, 10 police and hospital vehicles came to his house in the early night, a group of police officers and nurses went into his house. He was forcedly carried out by a group of 6 officers and taken to hospital. In a car, the officers tied his hands with a cloth and injected him with an unknown medication. The police searched his house and took his computer and smartphone, and made his mother consent to have him admitted to Rajanagarindra Psychiatric Hospital in Khon Kaen. The hospital's director, Nattakorn Champathong, explained that Tiwagorn had not been forced to enter the hospital. Khon Kaen’s police chief, Major General Puttipong Musikul explained that he was getting treatment because his relatives had him admitted.

Subsequent to protests by civil rights groups and media stories, Tiwagorn was released by Rajanagarindra Psychiatric Hospital, on 22 July 2020.

== See also ==
- 2020–2021 Thai protests
- List of peace activists
- Lèse-majesté in Thailand
- Jatupat Boonpattararaksa
