= Chanoknan Ruamsap =

Thai democracy activist

- ชนกนันท์ รวมทรัพย์
- Born: February 5, 1993 (age 33); Bangkok, Thailand
- Other name: Toon
- Education: Chulalongkorn University
- Occupation: Activist

Chanoknan Ruamsap (Thai: ชนกนันท์ รวมทรัพย์, RTGS: Chanoknan Ruamsap, pronounced [t͡ɕʰā.nók.nān rūa̯m.sáp]; born 1993) is a Thai pro-democracy activist. She is taking political refuge in the Republic of Korea after the Thailand government issued a notice of prosecution against her on the charge of insulting the monarchy by sharing a BBC article about the country's new king.

"The BBC article was published shortly after King Maha Vajiralongkorn ascended the throne in December 2016 following the death of his father, King Bhumibol Adulyadej, who died that October aged 88," as per the report of Reuters. While sharing the BBC article, she wrote: "If you dare write, I dare share."

Chanoknan has been charged with the lese-majeste, which is known as the world's toughest defamation law. As per the law, those offending the royal family shall face a sentence of up to 15 years in prison. Another activist, Jatipat "Pai Dao Din", who had earlier shared the article was arrested on similar charges and he is now imprisoned in Khon Kaen.

Out of more than 3,000 Facebook users who shared the article, Pai is the first while Chanoknan is the second person charged with the same offence.
