= Nopporn Suppipat =

Thai businessman

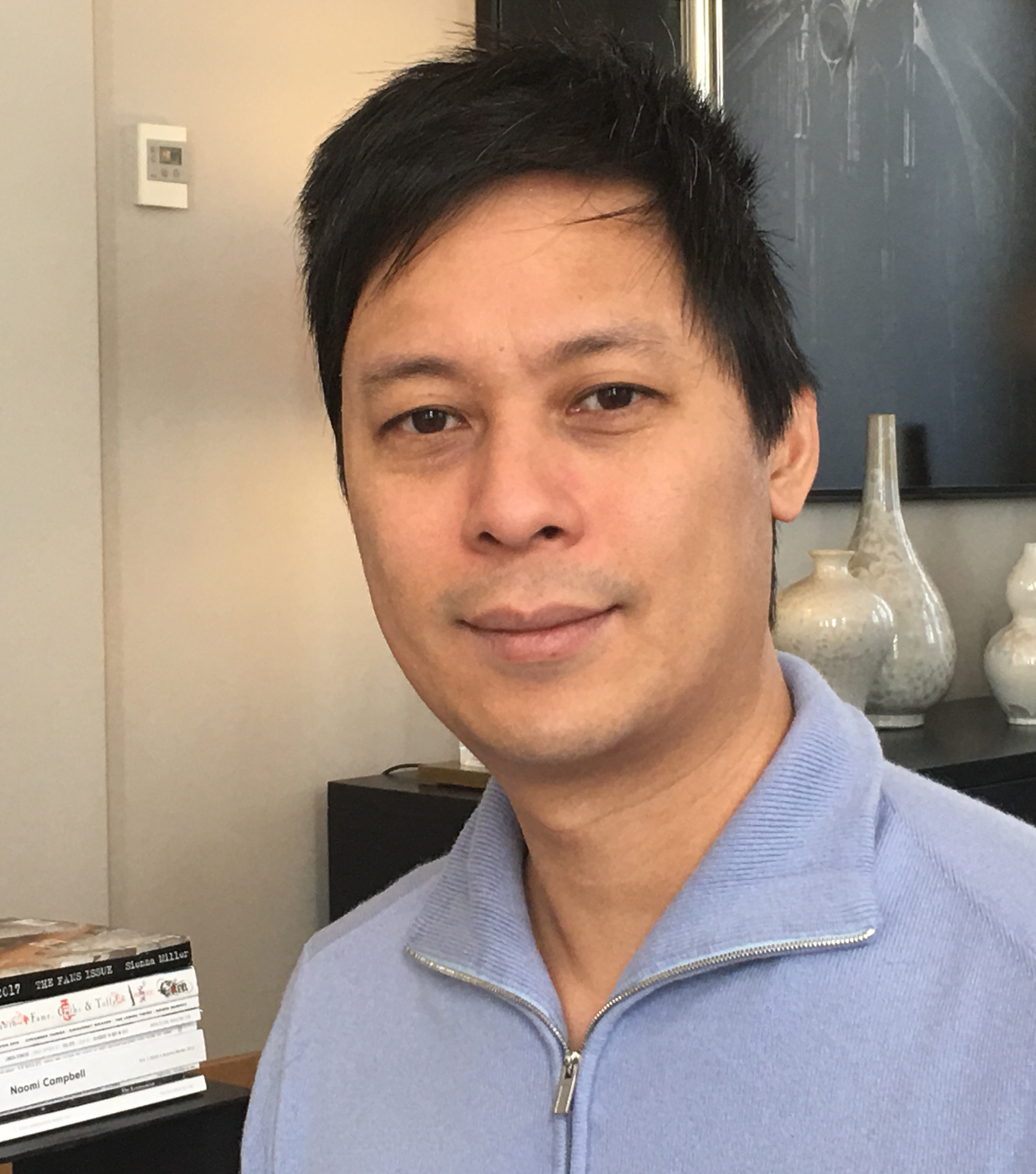
- Suppipat in 2017
- Born: March 30, 1971 (age 55); Bangkok Thailand
- Education: Baylor University; University of Miami
- Occupations: Investor and member of Strategic Committee in Blade Group
- Known for: Founder and CEO of Wind Energy Holding

Nopporn Suppipat (born March 30, 1971) is a Thai businessman living in Paris. He is the largest investor in French tech start-up, Blade Group. Suppipat became known in Thailand as founder and CEO of Wind Energy Holding (WEH) which became South East Asia's largest wind power business in 2014 with a valuation of $1.9 billion. Following the 2014 coup d'état in Thailand he was forced to flee the country after being accused of lese majeste. He was granted political asylum by the French authorities and has now settled in Paris.

== Early life ==
Nopporn Suppipat was born and raised in Bangkok, Thailand. He is the eldest son of two dentists. He moved to the US to attend high school and then undertook coursework for a BA at the University of Miami before eventually settling in Thailand.

== Career ==
Suppipat first entered the business investing in the stock market as a freshman. With seed money of $2,850, he became a dollar millionaire at the age of 20. Within two years however, he lost most of his fortune.

He later invested in a 100MW conventional power plant, but his investment ended after Thailand's economic bubble burst and his partner decided to sell in 1998. After this, he set up a small magazine business.

In 2005, Suppipat turned his attention to renewable energy. He hired a research company to carry out a feasibility study about Thailand's wind resources and in 2006 he launched Renewable Energy Corporation (REC).

In 2009, Suppipat launched Wind Energy Holding (WEH) with REC as the holding company and Pradej Kitti-itsaranon, the head of the SET-listed engineering group Demco Plc as a minority shareholder. He launched two sites in the northeastern province of Isan with a capacity to produce 207 megawatts of power, and with more projects in the pipeline. WEH grew to become Southeast Asia's largest wind energy company valued at $1.2 billion with preparations for an initial public offering.

In June 2014, Suppipat was listed number 31 on Forbes Asia's ranking of Thailand's 50 Richest with a net worth of $800 million.

== Controversy and exile ==
In the aftermath of the 2014 military coup, Suppipat was charged with violating Thailand's strict lese majeste laws in connection with the graft investigation that implicated relatives of former Thai Princess Srirasmi. After discovering he would be charged under lese majeste law, which carries a sentence of up to 15 years on each count, Suppipat travelled to Cambodia on November 30, 2014, stating: “I knew '112' (lese majeste charge) would mean I wouldn't get bail... I couldn't take that risk." Suppipat has protested his innocence and claims the charges against him were politically motivated because authorities perceived him to be close to former Prime Minister Thaksin Shinawatra. Suppipat is known among prominent Thai academics for being pro-democracy. Suppipat has been granted political asylum by the French authorities and is currently living in Paris.

== Sale of WEH to KPN Group and ensuing litigation ==
Almost immediately after leaving Thailand, Suppipat stood down as the CEO of WEH and was replaced by former co-chief executive Emma Collins. On June 25, 2015, Suppipat sold his majority stake to KPN Group with the management team of WEH becoming the minority shareholders in the company.

In 2015, KPN had been accused of mishandling WEH funds, which surfaced after a former company accountant Asama Thanyaphan claimed to have been forced to falsify the accounts to conceal the withdrawals from shareholders. KPMG, the external auditor for WEH, resigned shortly afterwards, refusing to endorse the 2015 accounts. Grant Thornton was appointed as WEH's auditor and were made aware of all of the allegations.

In 2018, Suppipat filed a lawsuit in the English High Court against WEH's chairman Nop Narongdej, the company's top management, and associated parties, alleging a fraudulent conspiracy in the 2015 sale of Suppipat's shares. Suppipat claimed he was pressured to sell his majority stake in WEH at a grossly undervalued price after he fled Thailand in late 2014, and that the buyers colluded to withhold full payment by falsifying documents and transferring assets. After a 20-week trial, the High Court (Commercial Court) ruled in Suppipat's favor in July 2023. The judgment by Mr. Justice Neil Calver found that Narongdej and 13 other defendants had indeed conspired to deceive Suppipat and prevent him from receiving the true value of his shares. At the time of the sale, Suppipat's stake was valued around US$872 million, yet he was paid only about US$176 million (with a conditional option for later buy-back). The court awarded Suppipat roughly US$900 million in damages (including interest) to compensate for the lost share value.

As of 2024, WEH operates eight onshore wind farms with a combined capacity of approximately 717 MW. The completion of five additional projects by early 2019 (adding 450 MW to an existing 270 MW base) made it the largest wind power producer in Thailand and Southeast Asia. WEH continues to expand its renewable energy portfolio and aims to reach about 1,500 MW of capacity by 2027 through new projects and acquisitions.

In 2026, Suppipat divested all his interest in WEH to UK-based investor Habour.

== Investment in Blade Group ==
Since moving to France, Suppipat has invested in French startup Blade Group which is developing a new type of Cloud computer called Shadow (service) and which is being marketed as “The PC of the Future.” On June 14, 2017, Blade announced a €51 million capital increase with Suppipat, the largest investor, joining the company's Strategic Committee. On November 21 Blade announced it expects to launch the service to U.S. customers at the beginning of 2018.
