= Fufu (dog) =

Air chief marshal and dog of Vajiralongkorn

- Species: Dog (Canis familiaris)
- Breed: Miniature poodle
- Sex: Male
- Born: 1997; Bangkok, Thailand
- Died: February 2015 (aged 17–18)
- Nationality: Thailand
- Owner: Vajiralongkorn (Rama X)
- Appearance: White coat
- Military career
- Allegiance: Thailand
- Branch: Royal Thai Air Force
- Service years: 2009–2015
- Rank: Air chief marshal

Fufu or Foo Foo (Thai: ฟูฟู, RTGS: Fufu; 1997–2015) was a Thai dog and air force officer who was the pet poodle of Vajiralongkorn, at the time the Crown Prince of Thailand, later King of Thailand.

== Life and events ==
The dog was a favorite of the prince, and often accompanied him on royal engagements. According to the prince, his second daughter Sirivannavari Nariratana bought the dog when he was aged about one month from Chatuchak market in Bangkok, along with some rabbits, hamsters and other dogs. He was "quite cute, but seemed very weak", and due to his daughter's young age the dog was kept in a pet shelter by palace staff. Fufu was occasionally put through his paces in public, as happened during the Thailand Grand Pet Show in Nakhon Pathom in December 2006 when the dog was said to have "exuded charm and executed clever stunts".

A few months later, United States Ambassador Ralph L. Boyce attended a gala dinner in honor of the Crown Prince at which the dog appeared "dressed in formal evening attire complete with paw mitts". Boyce further reported that Fufu had been "promoted" to the rank of air chief marshal in the Royal Thai Air Force. According to the ambassador's leaked cable to Washington, "at one point during the band's second number, he jumped up onto the head table and began lapping from the guests' water glasses, including my own. The air chief marshal's antics drew the full attention of the 600-plus audience members, and remains the talk of the town to this day."

== Death, funeral and reaction ==
The death of Fufu in early 2015 was followed by four days of Buddhist funeral rites and the dog's cremation, images from which were widely shared on social media in Thailand. The funeral attracted commentary from Thais as an oblique and ironic reflection of worries over the king's succession, which cannot be aired openly in Thailand due to a lèse-majesté law that attracts severe penalties.

== See also ==
- Tongdaeng
- Military animal
- List of individual dogs
