= Harry Nicolaides =

Australian writer

- Born: 1967; Melbourne, Australia
- Occupation: Writer

Harry Nicolaides (born 1967 or 1968) is an Australian writer of Greek-Cypriot origin who was imprisoned in Thailand under the Thai lèse majesté law, for a passage in a 2005 novel that was alleged to have defamed the Thai monarchy. On 19 January 2009, he was sentenced to three years in prison and was provisionally pardoned on 21 February, after having spent six months in a Thai prison.

In 2002, Nicolaides had published Concierge Confidential, a collection of fictional short stories based on his experience of having worked for seven years as a concierge at the Rydges Hotel in Melbourne. He lived in Thailand from 2003 to 2005, working as a teacher in the northern Thai city Chiang Rai. Nicolaides later also lived and worked in Saudi Arabia, and wrote an article about the country as he perceived it, for the New Statesman.

== Imprisonment, trial, sentence ==
On 31 August 2008, Nicolaides was arrested at Suvarnabhumi Airport while preparing to board a plane to Australia, apparently unaware of a March arrest warrant. The Thai law, section 112, reads: "Whoever defames, insults or threatens the King, the Queen, the Heir-apparent or the Regent, shall be punished with imprisonment of three to fifteen years."

On 19 January 2009, while wearing shackles and handcuffs, the day of the trial, Nicolaides told reporters that he would like to apologize and that he had "unqualified respect for the king of Thailand" and had not intended to insult him. He added "I was aware there were obscure laws (about the monarchy) but I didn't think they would apply to me." Nicolaides pleaded guilty and due to this confession a six-year prison sentence was reduced to three years, the minimum sentence under the law.

Nicolaides later described the harsh conditions in the Bangkok Remand Prison, relating that he had met the suspected Russian arms dealer Viktor Bout and the Canadian child molester Christopher Neil while incarcerated.

== Offending text ==
The passage in question was from Nicolaides's 2005 self-published novel, Verisimilitude. Is the truth, the truth? which sold seven copies. The book was described in a news release as "an uncompromising assault on the patrician values of the monarchy", and as "savage, ruthless and unforgiving" in revealing a society "obsessed with Western affluence and materialism." The paragraph which resulted in his imprisonment discusses the personal life of a fictional prince:

"From King Rama to the Crown Prince, the nobility was renowned for their romantic entanglements and intrigues. The Crown Prince had many wives major and minor with a coterie of concubines for entertainment. One of his recent wives was exiled with her entire family, including a son they conceived together, for an undisclosed indiscretion. He subsequently remarried with another woman and fathered another child. It was rumoured that if the prince fell in love with one of his minor wives and she betrayed him, she and her family would disappear with their name, familial lineage and all vestiges of their existence expunged forever."

Many Western media outlets, including CNN, refused to publish the substance of the allegation for fear of reprisals against their staff. Nicolaides says that he sent letters to the Royal Bureau of Household Affairs, the Ministry of Justice, the Ministry of Culture to get a legal opinion on the passage, but did not receive a reply.

Motive

Shortly after Nicolaides' release a former colleague at Mae Fah Luang University, Heath Dollar, accused the author of intentionally including the passage knowing it would violate Thai law. This was done, according to Dollar, as a publicity stunt to attract attention and ensure Nicolaides' books would be published.

== Royal pardon ==
Nicolaides' lawyers were pressing for a royal pardon, an effort supported by the Australian government. An official at the Thai Embassy in Canberra commented in January 2009 that foreigners convicted under this law usually get pardoned and deported.

On 21 February 2009, Nicolaides received a royal pardon and returned to Melbourne.

On his initial release, he had been taken to the Australian embassy in Bangkok and given clean clothes prior to the flight home. Minutes before boarding the flight he learned his mother had suffered a stroke two weeks prior and had lost the ability to speak. "I'm angry and frustrated and perplexed at my treatment," Nicolaides said. "I'm tired and exhausted and I've got a mother to go and see who's lost the power of speech." Nicolaides plans to write a book about the ordeal.

== Bibliography ==
=== Novels ===
- Verisimilitude (2005)

=== Short fiction ===
Collections

- Concierge Confidential (2002)

=== Essays and reporting ===
- Nicolaides, Harry (April 2009). "The King and I : life in a Bangkok prison". The Monthly (44): 30–41.
