= Tongdaeng =

Dog owned by Rama IX of Thailand

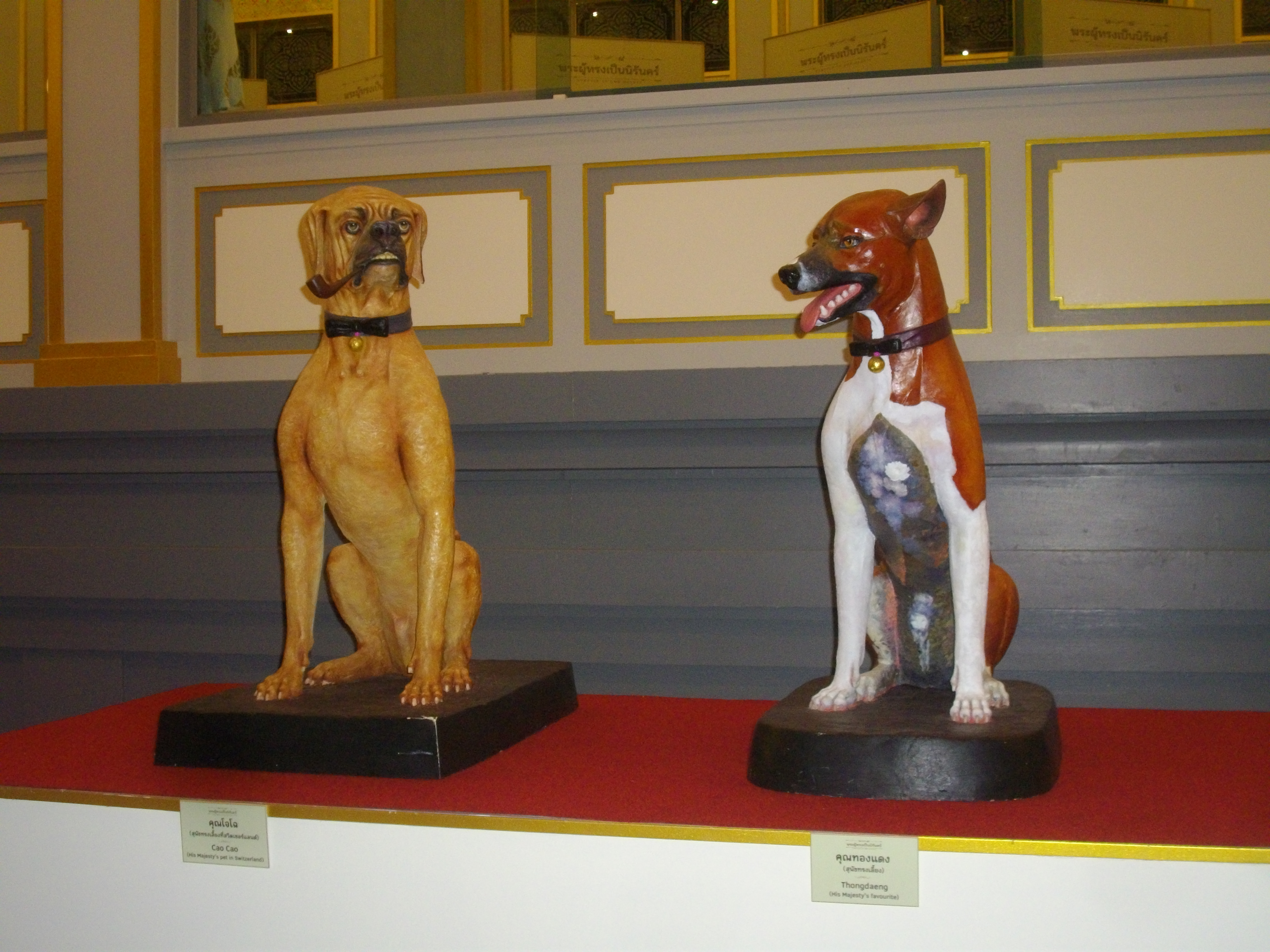
Sculpture of Cao Cao (left) and Tongdaeng (right), King Bhumibol Adulyadej's favorites, at the royal crematorium of King Bhumibol Adulyadej in 2017.

Tongdaeng (also spelled Thong Daeng, Thai: ทองแดง, lit. "copper"; 7 November 1998 – 26 December 2015) was a female copper-colored mixed breed dog and one of the pets owned by King Bhumibol Adulyadej of Thailand.

== Life ==
The king adopted Tongdaeng in late 1998 from the litter of a stray dog that had been taken in by a medical center he had recently dedicated his name to. Tongdaeng was nursed by Mae Mali (lit. Mother Jasmine), a former stray who was adopted by the king before.

King Bhumibol called her "a common dog who is uncommon", and in 2002 wrote an affectionate biography of her titled "The Story of Tongdaeng (เรื่อง ทองแดง)". The 84-page book, published in both Thai and English, quickly sold out of its first edition of 100,000 in Thailand. Since demand was so high, the book became an esteemed gift, and was reprinted many times. It is also commonly referred to as a parable on many social topics.

In the book, the king wrote that "Tongdaeng is a respectful dog with proper manners; she is humble and knows protocol. She would always sit lower than the King; even when he pulls her up to embrace her, Tongdaeng would lower herself down on the floor, her ears in a respectful drooping position, as if she would say, 'I don't dare.'"

A commemorative block of four postage stamps featuring Tongdaeng was issued by Thailand Post in 2006.

Tongdaeng died on 26 December 2015. A statue of her was created for the Royal Crematorium of King Bhumibol.

== Protection by lèse majesté law ==
Thanakorn Siripaiboon, a 27-year-old factory worker, was charged in 2015 with insulting the King through a "sarcastic" post about Tongdaeng on Facebook under the lèse majesté law in Thailand. His lawyer, Anon Nampa, informed the International New York Times that the charge "had not detailed the precise insult towards the animal". The Bangkok-based printer of the International New York Times removed the story from the 14 December 2015 print edition of the paper, just 12 days before Tongdaeng's death. He was released on bond after spending 90 days in prison. If convicted, Thanakorn could have faced up to a maximum of 37 years in prison. His current location and the status of his case are unknown as of June 2018.

According to the BBC, a prosecutor said Thanakorn had posted several photos of the dog on Facebook in a manner which appeared to mock the King, and in addition had been charged with posting the "like" button next to a doctored photo of the Thai monarch, which had been posted by another Facebook user. The case was eventually dropped.

== In media ==
A film based on Tongdaeng's biography, Khun Tongdaeng: The Inspirations (คุณทองแดงดิอินสไปเรชันส์), was released in November 2015.

== See also ==
- Fufu (dog)
- List of individual dogs
