= Computer Crime Act (Thailand) =

2007 Thai law

Parliament of Thailand
- Long title: Act on Computer Crime B.E. 2550
- Territorial extent: Thailand
- Assented to by: King Bhumibol Adulyadej
- Assented to: 10 June 2007
- Commenced: 17 July 2007

Amended by
- Act on Computer Crime (No. 2) B.E. 2560
- Status: In force

The Act on Computer Crime B.E. 2550 (Thai: พระราชบัญญัติว่าด้วยการกระทำความผิดเกี่ยวกับคอมพิวเตอร์ พ.ศ. ๒๕๕๐), commonly known as the Computer Crime Act (CCA) or the Computer Related Crime Act, is a 2007 Thai law addressing cyber offences and the distribution of illegal content.

== Legislative history ==
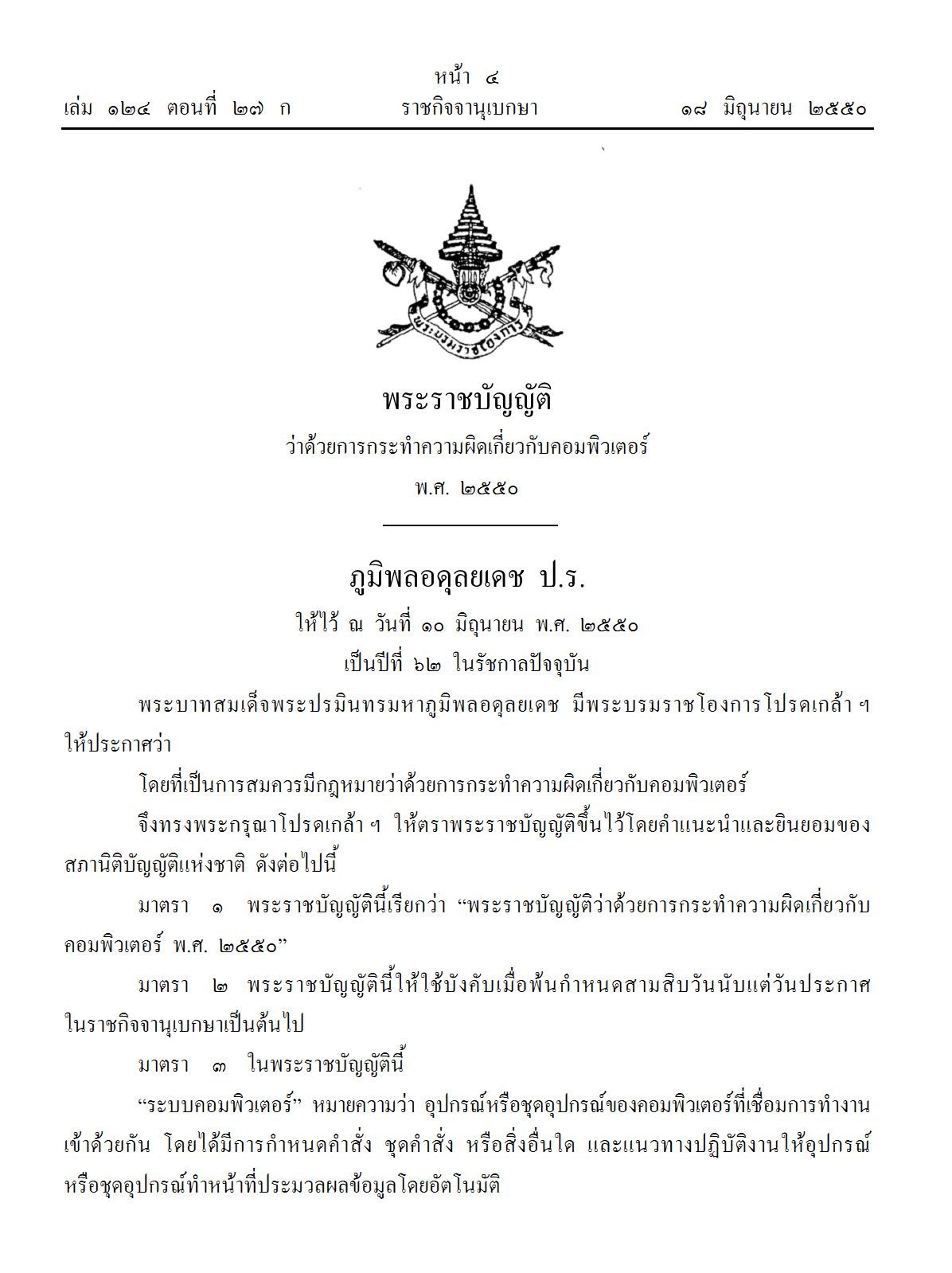
The first page of the Act as published in the Royal Gazette

The act was given royal assent by King Bhumibol Adulyadej on 10 June 2007. Following its publication in the Royal Gazette on 18 June 2007, it came into force 30 days later on 17 July 2007.

=== 2017 amendment ===
On 16 December 2016, an amendment known as the Act on Computer Crime (No. 2) B.E. 2560 was adopted unanimously by the junta-appointed National Legislative Assembly. The amendment, which was published in the Royal Gazette on 24 January 2017 and came into force on 24 May 2017, gave the Act a broadened scope and strengthened enforcement powers. The amendment empowers the Ministry of Digital Economy and Society to issue regulations subordinate to the Act.

== Reaction ==
The act has criticised by rights groups for violating rights to free speech and to silence dissent.

The Act has commonly being used in conjunction with section 112 of Thailand's criminal code to charge people with lèse-majesté violations.
