= Jaran Ditapichai =

Thai political scientist and activist

- Born: 6 July 1947 (age 79); Phatthalung, Thailand
- Other name: Comrade Paew
- Education: Thammasat University
- Occupations: University Lecturer; Academic; Political Scientist; Political Activist

Jaran Ditapichai (Thai: จรัล ดิษฐาอภิชัย; RTGS: Charan Dittha-a-phichai) is a Thai political scientist, educator, writer, political activist, and advocate of human rights.

== Biography ==
Jaran was born in Phatthalung, Thailand. He was a student leader during the 6 October 1976 massacre of student protesters and thereafter fled to join the Communist Party of Thailand, adopting the nom de guerre "สหายแผ้ว" (Comrade "Paew" – or Comrade Clarity).

He was a member of the Thai National Human Rights Commission, but was expelled on 26 September 2007 by the National Legislative Assembly, which had been installed by the military junta that had taken power in the 2006 coup.

Jaran fled to France after the 2014 military coup. The government of France granted Jaran and other lèse majesté suspects a refugee status in 2015.

== Education ==
- BA – Faculty of Political Science, Thammasat University
- MA – Department of History, University of Paris 7
- Post Graduate Studies – Political Philosophy, University of Paris 1 (Sorbonne)

== Work ==
- 1990–2000: Assistant Professor on the Faculty of Social Sciences at Rangsit University
- 1998–2000: Chairman of the Union for Civil Liberty
- 2001–2006: Member of the National Human Rights Commission

== Publications ==
- Jaran's works include reporting on the methods and works of public hearings in Thai society (with Faculty)
- report : "On the Restructuring of the Thai Parliament"
- book : "The French Revolution", Volumes 1 & 2
- book : "Leading up to 14 October"
- book : "From Ratchadamnoern to Shwedagong"
- book : "A Citizen's handbook on Human Rights"
- book : "On the Path Toward Human Rights"

== Academic rank ==
- Assistant Professor
