= Nidhi Eoseewong =

Thai historian, writer, and political commentator (1940–2023)

- นิธิ เอียวศรีวงศ์
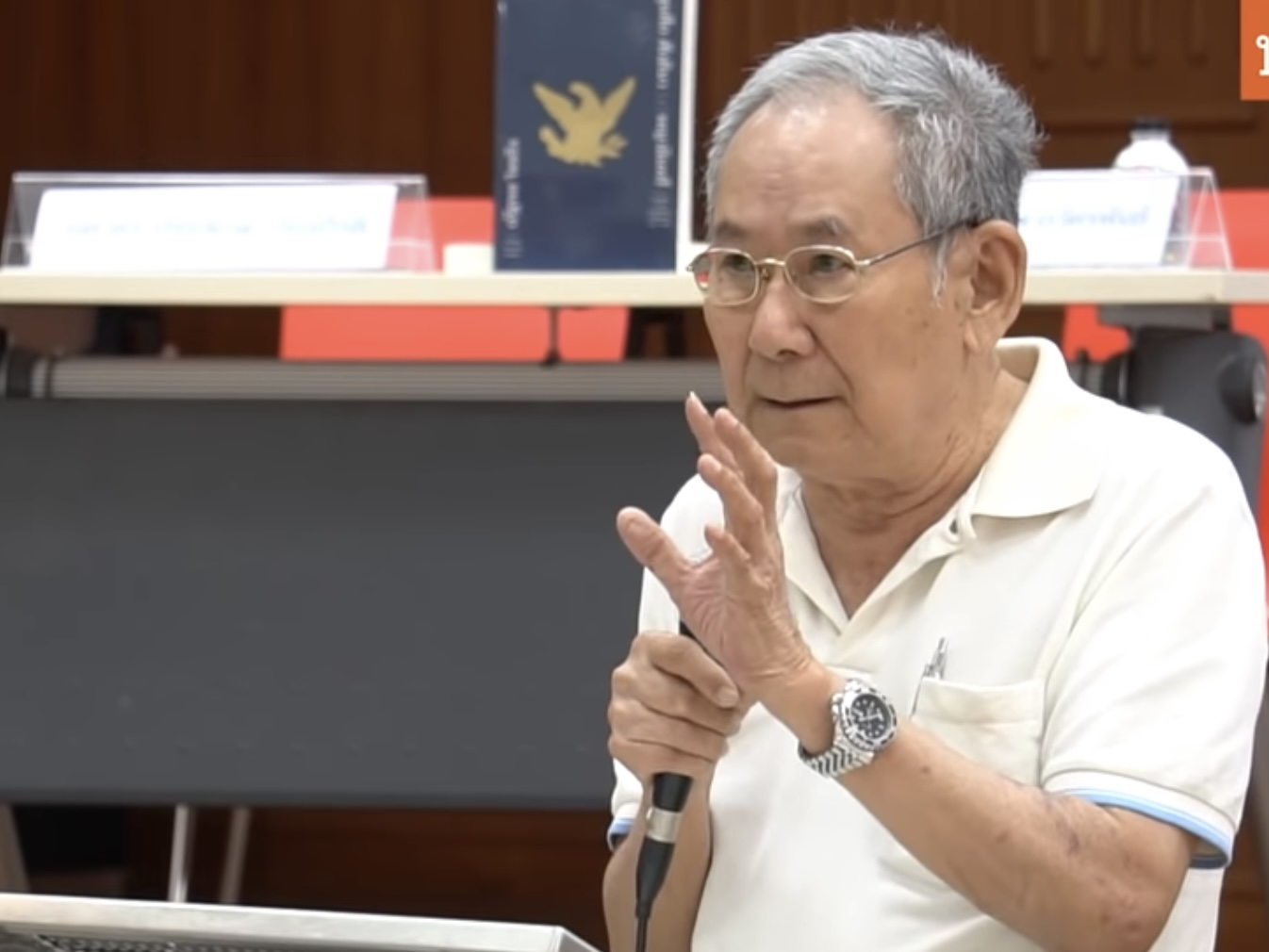
- Eoseewong in 2020
- Born: 23 May 1940; Chiang Mai, Thailand
- Died: 7 August 2023 (aged 83)
- Other name: Nithi Aeusrivongse
- Occupations: Historian, writer, political commentator
- Awards: Sriburapha Award 2002; Fukuoka Prize 1999

Academic background
- Education: University of Michigan; Chulalongkorn University
- Thesis: Fiction as History: A Study of Pre-war Indonesian Novels and Novelists 1920–1942

Nidhi Eoseewong (Thai: นิธิ เอียวศรีวงศ์, RTGS: Nithi Iaosiwong, pronounced [ní(ʔ).tʰíʔ ʔīaw.sǐː.wōŋ]; also rendered Nithi Aeusrivongse, Nithi ‘Īaosīwong, and Nithi ʻĪeosīwong; 23 May 1940 – 7 August 2023) was a Thai historian, writer, and political commentator.

== Biography ==
Nidhi Eoseewong was born on 23 May 1940, to an ethnic Chinese family in Chiang Mai, Thailand. He studied at Assumption College Sriracha in Chonburi Province, and went on to earn bachelor's and master's degrees in history from Chulalongkorn University in Bangkok. Upon graduation, he accepted a position teaching history at Chiang Mai University, where he would go on to spend the majority of his professional career. He took temporary leave to continue his studies, completing a PhD from the University of Michigan in 1976. He retired in 2000, but remained active in the academic community. He was an important contributor to the website Midnight University, regularly publishing and making appearances. He died from lung cancer on 7 August 2023, at the age of 83.

== Awards ==
Honours include the Outstanding Research Award from the National Research Council of Thailand, the Siburapha Award, and the Fukuoka Asian Culture Prize.

== Works ==
- Fiction as History: A Study of Pre-war Indonesian Novels and Novelists 1920–1942 (Published by University Microfilms International, 1976)
- ปากไก่และใบเรือ : รวมความเรียงว่าด้วยวรรณกรรม และประวัติศาสตร์ต้นรัตนโกสินทร์ Pak kai lae bai rua: wa duai kan suksa prawatisat – wannakam ratanakosin [Quill and sail: On the study of history and literature in the early Bangkok era] (1984)
- Kanmueang Thai Samai Phra Narai [Thai politics in the reign of King Narai] (1984)
- การเมืองไทยสมัยพระเจ้ากรุงธนบุรี Kanmueang Thai Samai Phrachao Krung Thonburi [Thai politics in the reign of King Taksin] (1993)
- Krung Taek, Phra Chao Tak lae Prawatisat Thai: Wa Duai Prawatisat lae Prawatisatniphon [The fall of the capital, King Taksin, and Thai history: On history and historiography] (2002).
- Morng sathannakarn phaktai phan wæn 'kabot chaona, Sinlapa Watthanatham 25, no.8 (June 2004): 110–124; translated by the Regional Studies Program, Walailak University (March 2005) as "Understanding the Situation in the South as a 'Millenarian Revolt'"
