= Somsak Jeamteerasakul =

Thai historian

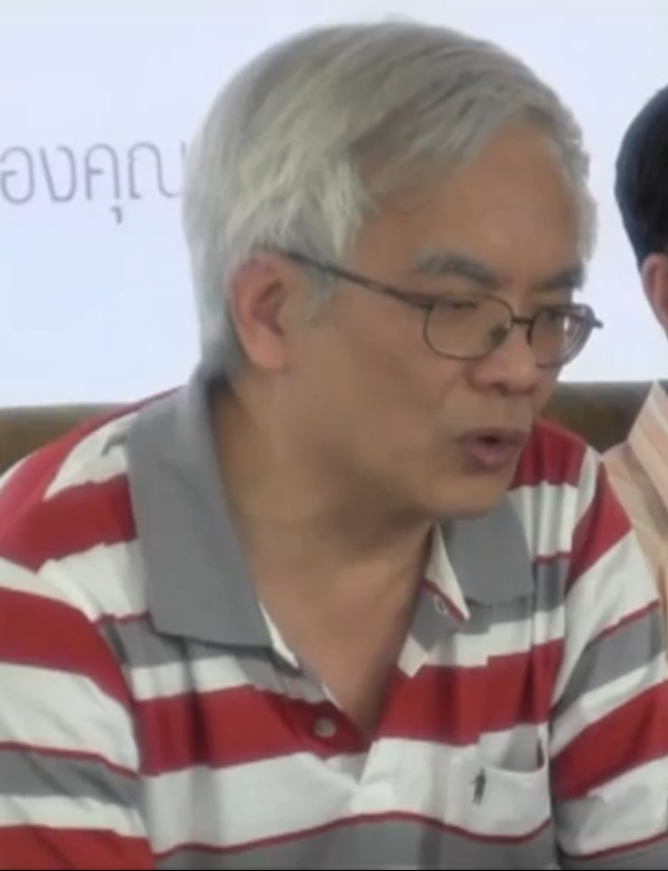
- Born: Sukung Sae-phua; 22 June 1958 (age 68); Bangkok, Thailand
- Education: Monash University (PhD); Thammasat University
- Occupations: Historian; university lecturer
- Known for: Monarchical reform movement in 2020–2021 Thai protests

Somsak Jeamteerasakul (Thai: สมศักดิ์ เจียมธีรสกุล; RTGS: Somsak Chiamthirasakun) is a former history lecturer at the Faculty of Liberal Arts, Thammasat University. His academic field is contemporary political history, especially recent Thai history from 1930. He is a critic of Thailand's monarchy and its lèse majesté law. He has lived in self-imposed exile in France since the 2014 Thai coup d'état, following violent attacks and lèse majesté charges.

== Background ==
Somsak Jeamteerasakul was born on 22 June 1958 in Bangkok to Chinese migrant parents. His Chinese surname is 潘, pronounced as Phua in Teochew or Pan in Mandarin Chinese. His birth name was Sukung Sae-phua, but later changed to Somsak Jeamteerasakul when he started primary school. He graduated from secondary school at Suankularb Wittayalai School and Thammasat University. Somsak has been interested in politics since he was a student representative during his secondary education. He was a student leader and present at the campus during the 6 October 1976 Thammasat University massacre. He was arrested and later spent two years in jail.

Somsak Jeamteerasakul earned a PhD degree from Monash University in Australia. His doctoral thesis The communist movement in Thailand was published in 1991. During the 1990s and early-2000s Somsak wrote extensively and critically about the role of the monarchy. He has been openly critical of both Rama VII and Rama IX both of whom Somsak perceives as having obstructed the development of democracy in Thailand. Royalist groups have accused him of trying to "overthrow the monarchy". Somsak has denied the accusation in a press statement in which he explicitly states, "Each and every one of my public statement and written work is premised on the assumption of the abolition of the monarchy."

== Research and political activism ==
Somsak's research deals primarily with recent Thai history and its interpretation, especially regarding the role of the Thai monarchy in politics since the Siamese revolution of 1932, the death of King Ananda Mahidol, and the events of 14 October 1973 and 6 October 1976. Considered one of the experts in the subject of the Thai monarchy, Somsak often presents viewpoints contrary to the mainstream understanding prevalent in Thai society, including frequent criticism of the monarchy and calls for its reform.

Academically, Somsak is known for having an independent, outspoken style, including harsh criticisms that have led to conflict with other progressive scholars such as Charnvit Kasetsiri, Nidhi Eoseewong, Thongchai Winichakul, and Giles Ji Ungpakorn. Similarly, although Somsak has strong sympathies towards the Red Shirt movement, he is not affiliated with the associated Pheu Thai Party or the governments of Thaksin Shinawatra and Yingluck Shinawatra, and has directly criticized Thaksin and Pheu Thai.

=== Criticism of monarchy ===
In 2010 Somsak Jeamteerasakul posted eight proposals to change Thailand's monarchy. One of the suggestions called for removing an article from Thailand's constitution that speaks of the king as "enthroned in a position of revered worship". Another proposal calls for abolishing "one-sided public relations and educational activities related to the monarchy." Somsak advocates the abolition of Privy Council of Thailand and abolition of Crown Property Bureau, which has been estimated to hold US$37 billion or more in assets and according to Thai law can be spent "at the king's pleasure". Somsak also advocates the abolition of article 112 of Thailand's criminal code, the lèse-majesté law, which he described as: "against the principles of democracy and even against common sense. "You cannot regard the monarchy as always right all the time."

Somsak's eight-point proposal to reform Thailand's monarchy:

1. Repeal Section 8 of the Constitution, [which says the King shall be enthroned in a position of revered worship and shall not be violated and no person shall expose the King to any sort of accusation or action.]
2. Repeal Section 112 of the Criminal Code
3. Abolish the Privy Council
4. Repeal the 1948 Crown Assets Management Act
5. Ban all one-sided public relations and education about the monarchy
6. Revoke the royal prerogative in expressing political opinions
7. Revoke the royal prerogative in all royal projects
8. Ban all donations for use at the royal discretion

On 28 July 2019, the birthday of King Vajiralongkorn, Somsak reiterated his call for reform of the monarchy.

Somsak Jeamteerasakul has been critical of King Bhumibol Adulyadej for his role in Thammasat University massacre. Somsak argues Bhumibol's involvement in drumming up anti-communist hysteria and his support of far-right royalist paramilitaries makes him partly responsible of the brutal beatings, rape, and murder of the students on the day of the massacre.

=== Lèse Majesté complaints ===
In May 2011, the Royal Thai Army filed a lèse majesté complaint against Somsak Jeamteerasakul due to an open letter he had written and published on the internet in response to a Princess Chulabhorn TV interview. In the open letter, Somsak criticized the princess for attending the funeral of a pro-monarchy demonstrator in 2008, but not mentioning in her interview the deaths of anti-government protesters in the 2010 Thai military crackdown. Somsak denied the lèse majesté charges and argued that Section 112 of the Criminal Code, dealing with lèse majesté, only applies to the king, queen, heir-apparent, and regent.

In 2014, the Thai military junta reportedly filed another lèse majesté complaint against Somsak. In response to the junta's lèse majesté accusations, Somsak wrote: "It is clear that I would never have the opportunity to be treated fairly in accordance with the laws. Therefore, I have the legitimate right to preserve my life, body, and liberty by refusing to allow the military junta, who committed the treasonous act of seizing power, to arrest and harm me under the excuse of lese majeste."

In February 2016, Royal Thai Police were reported to be investigating statements made by Somsak Jeamteerasakul in a 2013 TV interview as possible lèse majesté violations. In the interview Somsak expressed his opinion that the Thai royal family's influence and power exceeds that of a modern constitutional monarchy.

Somsak's followers on social media have been summoned and questioned by the military junta. Thailand's Technology Crime Suppression Division has informed them that sharing or liking content from Somsak Jeamteerasakul may constitute a lèse majesté offence.

== Post-2014 military coup ==
After the 2014 Thai coup d'état and military junta's established National Council for Peace and Order, Somsak Jeamteerasakul was one of the first academics summoned to receive what the military called "attitude adjustment". After refusing to comply with the summons, the military junta issued an arrest warrant for Somsak and revoked his passport. During this period, Somsak went into hiding and later confirmed he hadn't lived in his house since a February 2014 gun attack. He reappeared on social media again in November 2014. He said to have changed his place of stay frequently during this period. It was later confirmed that Somsak had fled to France.

Somsak explained his self-imposed exile by writing: "In the situation that individuals who severely violated the laws have installed themselves as rulers of the country by illegal means, and aimed to cause harm to my life, body, and liberty in such a direct manner, I regard it as the rights and duty of a bureaucrat, citizen, and member of the Thammasat community to disobey, oppose, and reject their effort to jail and harm me."

In July 2015 the Thai military junta made an extradition request for Somsak and other critics of the monarchy living in France. France granted Somsak and other lèse majesté suspects refugee status in 2015.

=== Status at Thammasat University ===
In February 2015, Somkit Lertpaithoon, the Rector of Thammasat University, signed an order to end the employment of Somsak Jeamteerasakul. Thammasat University lecturers publicly criticized the decision as unfair and politically motivated. Thammasat economist Associate Professor Pichit Likitkijsomboon said: "It's apparent that university administrators are ready to use legal means to threaten those who have differing political opinions". "One can look at it as an attempt to set an example for other [academics] who come out to make a [pro-democracy] move. It's likely about his political stance," Thammasat political scientist Pongkwan Sawasdipakdi said.

The rector defended the decision as not politically motivated but because Somsak had failed to show up to work for 15 consecutive days. Somsak responded that he had attempted to seek for a sabbatical leave and then offered to resign his position but both of these requests were denied. University administrators stated that while they did receive Somsak's letter of resignation it should have been submitted 15 days prior to his departure under university's regulations.

The administrative court ruled in July 2016 that the termination of Somsak from his position at the Thammasat University was illegal. The court commented in its decision that Somsak had "extraordinary reasons" that prevented him from resigning his position at the university. Termination from his university position would have meant a loss of pension and other benefits gained over a career of over 20 years.

== Documents ==
=== Books and research ===
- Newly built history: collection of articles about October 14 and October 6.
- The history of Thai national anthem today.
- The Communist Movement in Thailand

=== Articles ===
- My university
- What is the Crown Property Bureau?
- Communist Party of Thailand and Peace Rebellion
- Thai society from feudalism to capitalism.
- 50 years of executions, 17 February 1955
- The Mystery of the Dead
- Puey Ungphakorn: Year of Birth, Chinese Child, October 6
- The birth of Chakri Day or the National Day in the absolute era?
- When Thawit Ritidet approached and asked for forgiveness from His Majesty the King.
- In the case of Tawit Ritidet suing King Prajadhipok
- Dissected-settled history, October 6, 1976. Cabinet meeting on October 6, 1976.
- Discussion: Can Thailand be a democracy?
- Mass Monarchy
- Stop remembering 6 October is good.
- Thailand reached the age of 65: New information about changing the country name, year 1939
- History of the Thai National Day from 24 June to 5 December
- The government promises Dharmasak "congratulating" in the case of "a statement condemning 3 tyrants", 8 November 1973.
- The description of the demise of the "Lord Piece"
- The history of the word "Natal" in "The Queen."
- After October 14
- On the reign of King Anand Remarks and arguments for the article of Suphot Dantrakul in the "Fah Diao" edition of the Royal Institute and Thai Society.
- King Anand ascended the throne according to the hierarchy of the Royal Law. Or because Pridi supports? (1)
- Birth of "Chakri Day" or "National Day" during the absolute monarchy?
- New data on the demise of the case: Luang Thamrong clearly identifies the result of the investigation, who is the real suspect.
- Kenneth Landon's memo about the passing of the case and rumors about the grand plans of the Pramoj brothers.
- On the secret disclosure letter The case of the demise of the newly released "Pridi"
- The meaning and history of "The democratic system with the King as Head of State"
- History of "The democratic system with the King as Head of State" as a civil service ideology
- 24 June: 4 Interpretations
- The wind helps to convey ...
- 24 June How was it and how could it be a national day?
- "8 August 1965" (8-8-08) "Days of Gun Shots" (Part 1)
- "8 August 1965" (8-8-08) "Days of Gun Shots" (Part 2)
