= Pavin Chachavalpongpun =

Thai scholar known for criticism of Thai monarchy

- ปวิน ชัชวาลพงศ์พันธ์
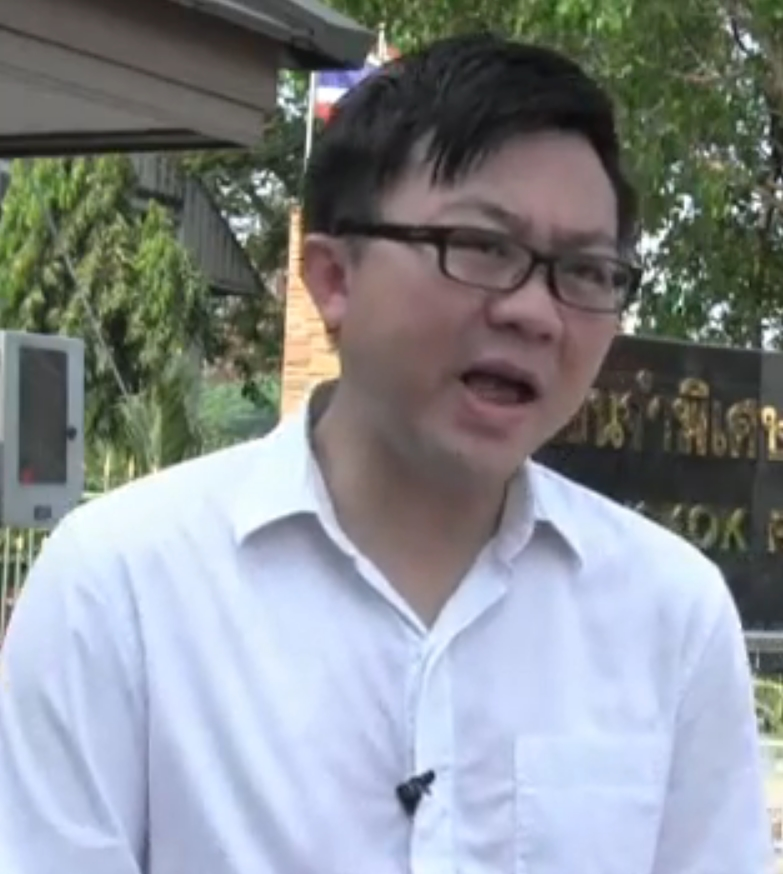
- Pavin in 2012
- Born: 4 March 1971 (age 55); Bangkok, Thailand
- Known for: Criticism of the Thai monarchy

Academic background
- Education: Chulalongkorn University (BA); SOAS University of London (PhD)
- Thesis: Thainess: Hegemony and Power: A Study of Thai Nationhood and Its Implications on Thai-Burmese Relations, 1988–2000 (2002)

Academic work
- Discipline: Political scientist
- Institutions: Kyoto University

Pavin Chachavalpongpun (Thai: ปวิน ชัชวาลพงศ์พันธ์; RTGS: Pawin Chatchawanphongphan; born 4 March 1971) is a Thai scholar notable for his criticism of the Thai monarchy. He currently resides in Japan as a political exile. He has been teaching at the Center for Southeast Asian Studies at Kyoto University since 2012.

== Career ==
Pavin received his bachelor's degree from Chulalongkorn University in 1993 and his doctorate from SOAS in 2002. He worked as a diplomat in Thailand's Ministry of Foreign Affairs for sixteen years, then as a political science academic, and he is currently a professor at the Center for Southeast Asian Studies, Kyoto University, where he is editor-in-chief of its Center for Southeast Asian Studies' Kyoto Review of Southeast Asia. He is the author of several books including A Plastic Nation: The Curse of Thainess in Thai-Burmese Relations (2005), Reinventing Thailand: Thaksin and His Foreign Policy (2010), Coup, King, Crisis: A Critical Interregnum in Thailand (2020), and Rama X: The Thai Monarchy under King Vajiralongkorn, (2023), which has been banned by the Thai police even before it was published.

== Education ==
Pavin graduated with an honorary degree in Bachelor of Arts (Political Science) in International Relations from Chulalongkorn University in 1993. He received his Doctor of Philosophy from SOAS in 2002.

== Criticism of the Thai monarchy ==
Pavin is a well-known critic of the Thai monarchy and the state of Thai politics more generally. He regularly gives lectures and writes articles, books and opinion editorials on these topics for outlets such as The Washington Post, The New York Times and the South China Morning Post. He supported reforms of the monarchy and the country's lèse majesté law. In 2011, he launched a campaign to free a political prisoner, Ah Kong, who was charged with lèse majesté for allegedly sending text messages which insulted the monarchy to an unknown person. After the 2014 Thai coup d'état, the junta ordered him to turn himself in, but he refused and even mocked the summons by asking if he could send his pet chihuahua to meet with junta leader General Prayut Chan-o-cha in his stead. On 13 June 2014, the NCPO issued an arrest warrant against Pavin, and he has lived in exile ever since. His current residence is in Kyoto, Japan. In July 2019, he was apparently assaulted near his residence, in an incident allegedly linked to the Thai authorities.

In 2020, he launched a Facebook page "The Royalists Marketplace" as a forum to discuss and criticize the Thai monarchy freely. The Thai authorities successfully took action to shut down access to the Facebook page, which has accumulated around one million users, and which Facebook may be appealing, while Pavin is facing a charge of cybercrime. He has since launched a replacement Facebook page "The Royalists Marketplace-Talad Luang". A Facebook spokesperson stated, “Requests like this are severe, contravene international human rights law, and have a chilling effect on people’s ability to express themselves... We work to protect and defend the rights of all internet users and are preparing to legally challenge this request.”
