= Midnight University =

Thai educational website

Midnight University is a Thai virtual university for free public education. It contains over 1,500 scholarly articles. In 2006 it received more than 2.5 million visits per month from users around the world. Besides providing scholarly articles, the Midnight University website provides space for the public to discuss social and political issues. It is based in Chiang Mai.

Following the 2006 Thai coup d'état, Midnight University's website was shut down after Chiang Mai University management and staff protested the junta's draft interim charter. Kasian Tejapira of Thammasat University claimed the website was "the foremost free and critical educational and public intellectual website in Thailand. The shutdown was not only a huge loss to academic and intellectual freedom in Thai society, but also the closure of a free forum for the contention of ideas so as to find a peaceful alternative to violent conflict in Thailand." Kraisorn Pornsuthee, Ministry of Information and Communication Technology (MICT) Permanent Secretary claimed ignorance of the shutdown of the website and declined to give his rationale or opinion about the matter.
