= Criminal Court of Thailand =

Thai court of justice of first instance

Criminal Court
- ศาลอาญา
- Jurisdiction: Thailand
- Location: Ratchadaphisek Road, Chom Phon Subdistrict, Chatuchak District, Bangkok
- Authorised by: Statute of the Courts of Justice, 2543 BE (2000); Criminal Code; Code of Criminal Procedure
- Appeals to: Court of Appeal
- Website: Crimc.coj.go.th

President
- Currently: Sakchai Rangsiwong
- Since: 1 October 2022

The Criminal Court (Thai: ศาลอาญา; RTGS: San-aya; IPA: [sǎːn.ʔaː.jaː]) is a Thai court of justice of first instance responsible for the application of criminal law in Bangkok. The court is located on Ratchadaphisek Road and is colloquially called "Ratchada Criminal Court" (ศาลอาญารัชดาฯ).

== Background ==
During Sukhothai Kingdom, Ayutthaya Kingdom and the initial period of Rattanakosin Kingdom, the judicial service was part of the executive service. King Chulalongkorn later launched an administrative reform by which the courts competent to deal with criminal cases in Bangkok, that is, the Metropolitan Court (ศาลนครบาล) and the Outer Criminal Court (ศาลอาญานอก), were consolidated into a Royal Criminal Court (ศาลพระราชอาชญา). The Royal Criminal Court sat at the Military Registration Hall (หอสัสดี) within the Front Palace.

In 1935, a Statute of the Courts of Justice was promulgated and renamed the Royal Criminal Court to the Criminal Court. In 1941, the Criminal Court moved its seat to a building newly constructed on Rachini Road near the Petty Crimes Division (กองลหุโทษ) of the Corrections Department, Ministry of Justice, in Phra Nakhon District. On 25 March 1992, the Criminal Court again moved to a new building on Ratchadaphisek Road in Chatuchak District.

== Jurisdiction ==
=== Jurisdiction ratione materiae ===
According to the Statute of the Courts of Justice, 2543 BE (2000), the Criminal Court has the jurisdiction ratione materiae (jurisdiction by reason of matters) over all criminal offences committed or believed to have been committed within its territory. However, these offences must be punishable by imprisonment for more than three years, a fine of more than sixty thousand baht or both.

The offences liable to lower penalties fall within the jurisdiction of municipal courts.

=== Jurisdiction ratione tertiis ===
Under the Statute of the Courts of Justice, BE 2543 (2000), the Criminal Court has the jurisdiction ratione tertiis (jurisdiction by reason of territory) over sixteen districts of Bangkok:

1. Bang Kapi District,
2. Bang Khen District (Anusawari Subdistrict only),
3. Bang Sue District,
4. Bueng Kum District,
5. Chatuchak District,
6. Din Daeng District,
7. Don Mueang District,
8. Dusit District,
9. Huai Khwang District,
10. Lak Si District,
11. Lat Phrao District (Lat Phrao Subdistrict only),
12. Phaya Thai District,
13. Phra Nakhon District,
14. Ratchathewi District,
15. Sai Mai District (Khlong Thanon Subdistrict only), and
16. Wang Thonglang District.

Under the Criminal Code, the Criminal Court and all other courts of criminal jurisdiction also have the jurisdiction ratione tertiis over all places outside Thailand, subject to the conditions set forth therein.

=== Special jurisdiction ===
Although an offence is not committed within its territory, the Criminal Court is competent to handle the offence for the sake of convenience, if the offender resides, is domiciled or is arrested in one of the mentioned districts of Bangkok or if the inquiry is conducted therein.

Moreover, the Statute of the Courts of Justice, 2543 BE (2000), allows any offence to be brought to the Criminal Court, even though it does not meet both the criteria of territory and the criteria of convenience. But the Criminal Court is competent to exercise its discretion as to whether it should accept to address such offence.

== Procedure ==
The procedural activities of the Criminal Court are mainly regulated by the Statute of the Courts of Justice, 2543 BE (2000), as well as the Code of Criminal Procedure. The Code of Criminal Procedure, section 15, states that if nothing in the code is applicable to any procedural activity, the Code of Civil Procedure applies thereto in so far as possible.

The Statute of the Courts of Justice, 2543 BE (2000), section 2, defines the Criminal Court as a court of first instance and, section 26, requires that its quorum be constituted by at least two judges. The Code of Criminal Procedure, section 184, prescribes that a decision of the court is based upon a majority of votes of the judges constituting the quorum. If such majority cannot be reached because there are two or more conflicting opinions amongst those judges, section 184 provides that the opinion most favourable to the defendant prevails.

Pursuant to the Code of Criminal Procedure, section 193, the decisions of the Criminal Court can be appealed to the Court of Appeal which is a court of second instance.

== Administration ==
=== Overview ===
The officers of the Criminal Court are divided into two types: judicial officers and administrative officers. The judicial officers are formally called the "court of justice judicial officers" (ข้าราชการตุลาการศาลยุติธรรม) and the administrative officers, the "court of justice administrative officers" (ข้าราชการศาลยุติธรรม). The judicial officers deal with judicial affairs of the court, whilst the administrative officers handle administrative affairs of the court (providing support to the judicial affairs).

=== Judicial service ===
==== Presidency ====
The judicial officers are led by the presidency of the court consisting of one judicial officer called "President of the Criminal Court" (อธิบดีผู้พิพากษาศาลอาญา) and another judicial officer called "Vice President of the Criminal Court" (รองอธิบดีผู้พิพากษาศาลอาญา). If necessary, the Statute of the Courts of Justice, 2543 BE (2000), allows the appointment of more than one but no more than three vice presidents.

List of presidents of the court
#	Name		Tenure		References
#	Romanised (RTGS)	Thai	Start	End	References
	Phraya Lekha Wanit Thamma Withak (Yian Lekhawanit)	พระยาเลขวณิชธรรมวิทักษ์ (เหยียน เลขะวณิช)		31 January 1941	
	Luang Prasat Suppha Nit (Pramun Suwannason)	หลวงประสาทศุภนิติ (ประมูล สุวรรณศร)	1 February 1941		
	Phra Manu Phan Wimon San (Manuphan Lilamian)	พระมนูภันย์วิมลสาร (มนูภันย์ ห๎ลีละเมียร)	1 September 1944	31 October 1945	
	Phra Niti Kan Prasom (Sa-nguan Chaichanian)	พระนิติการณ์ประสม (สงวน ชัยเฉนียน)	1 November 1945	30 September 1946	
	Phra Sara Nit Panya	พระสารนิติปัญญา	1 October 1946		
	Thongchai Senamontri	ธงชัย เสนามนตรี	1 October 2013	30 September 2014	
	Raengron Pariphonphotphisut	แรงรณ ปริพนธ์พจนพิสุทธิ์	1 October 2014	19 October 2016	

==== Divisions ====
The judicial service of the court is divided into divisions (แผนก).

List of divisions of the court
#	Name		Date of establishment	References
#	English	Thai	Date of establishment	References
1	General Criminal Division	แผนกคดีอาญาทั่วไป		
2	Division for Corruption and Misconduct of State Authorities	แผนกคดีทุจริตและประพฤติมิชอบของเจ้าหน้าที่ของรัฐ	13 June 2015	
3	Human Trafficking Division	แผนกคดีค้ามนุษย์	13 June 2015	
4	Narcotics Division	แผนกคดียาเสพติด	13 June 2015	

Each division consists of thirteen chambers (คณะ). Each chamber consists of at least two judges. Cases brought to the court are assigned to the responsible chambers. A judge of one chamber may also be a member of another chamber.

=== Administrative service ===
The administrative officers of the Criminal Court are attached to the Criminal Court Administrative Office (สำนักอำนวยการประจำศาลอาญา). The office is led by one administrative officer called "Director of the Criminal Court Administrative Office" (ผู้อำนวยการสำนักอำนวยการประจำศาลอาญา) who is supervised by the Criminal Court presidency.

The office is divided into six sections:

1. Assistant Section (ส่วนช่วยอำนวยการ),
2. Financial Section (ส่วนคลัง),
3. Public Relations Section (ส่วนบริการประชาชนและประชาสัมพันธ์),
4. Case Management Section (ส่วนจัดการงานคดี),
5. Proceedings Support Section (ส่วนช่วยพิจารณาคดี), and
6. Dispute Settlement and Rights Protection Section (ส่วนไกล่เกลี่ยและประนอมข้อพิพาทและคุ้มครองสิทธิ).

== Seal ==
The Criminal Court adopts as its seal the National Coat of Arms created in 1873 by King Chulalongkorn. The seal is affixed to all judgments and orders of the court.

== Cultural references ==
- The Criminal Court is featured in a popular urban-style song, "Chu Thang Chai" (ชู้ทางใจ; "Adultery in Mind"), originally recorded by Thanin Inthrathep (ธานินทร์ อินทรเทพ) and later covered by many artists. The song speaks about a man who has one-sided love towards a married woman but feels that his love is a crime. He then confesses before the Criminal Court, hoping that the court would give him light penalties as the adultery is just committed in mind.
- The bend of Ratchadaphisek Road opposite to the Criminal Court is a place with a large banyan tree and a spirit house, where car accidents often take place. It has been called the "Curve of Hundred Corpses".
