= Lèse-majesté in Thailand =

Order of Prime Minister Sarit Thanarat for the summary execution of politicians Khrong Chandawong and Thongpan Sutthimat on communism and lèse-majesté charges in 1961

In Thailand, lèse-majesté is a criminal offence under Section 112 of the Thai Criminal Code, which prohibits any act that defames, insults, or threatens the King, the Queen, the heir-apparent, or the Regent. The provision reflects the long-standing doctrine of the monarch's inviolability within Thai political culture. Modern lèse-majesté legislation has existed since 1908, first appearing in the Rattanakosin era's Criminal Code influenced by continental European legal systems. Thailand remains the only constitutional monarchy in the world that has strengthened, rather than liberalized, its lèse-majesté laws following World War II.

With penalties ranging from three to fifteen years' imprisonment for each individual count, the law has been described by observers as the "world's harshest lèse majesté law" and "possibly the strictest criminal-defamation law anywhere." Its enforcement has often been characterized as being carried out "in the interest of the palace."

Since 1957, acts deemed insulting to the monarchy have been explicitly criminalized, a development that coincided with the rise of Field Marshal Sarit Thanarat's authoritarian regime. The law's wording leaves substantial room for interpretation, leading to controversy over its breadth and application. Broad interpretation reflects the inviolable and semi-divine status historically ascribed to Thai monarchs, resembling practices of feudal or absolute monarchies. The Supreme Court of Thailand has ruled that Section 112 also applies to deceased monarchs, thereby extending its reach beyond living members of the royal family. Furthermore, criticism of members of the Privy Council has occasionally prompted debate on whether lèse-majesté applies by association.

In practice, lèse-majesté charges have been filed for diverse acts—including satire, symbolic gestures, or online commentary. In extreme cases, even making sarcastic remarks about the King's pet dog or failing to rebuke others' insulting statements has resulted in prosecution. Anyone can file a lèse-majesté complaint, and under Thai legal practice, the police are obliged to formally investigate all allegations, regardless of motive.

The judicial process for lèse-majesté defendants has been repeatedly criticized by international observers. Details of charges are rarely made public due to state secrecy and censorship laws. Defendants often face months-long pretrial detention, and Thai courts routinely deny bail in nearly all Section 112 cases. The Working Group on Arbitrary Detention (WGAD) determined that pretrial detention of alleged offenders constitutes a violation of international human rights law. Courts have sometimes declared that accusers do not need to prove the factual basis of the alleged defamation, only that the statements are "defamatory to the monarchy." As a result, many defendants choose to plead guilty and subsequently petition for a royal pardon, which is viewed as the fastest route to release.

Following the 1976 military coup, Thai military leaders have repeatedly invoked alleged surges in lèse-majesté offences to justify political intervention. This rationale was cited during the 2006 and 2014 coups. Since the mid-2000s, the number of cases has risen sharply, extending to ordinary citizens and online activists, many of whom received lengthy prison terms.

International human rights organizations, including Amnesty International and Human Rights Watch, have condemned the use of lèse-majesté as a political tool to suppress dissent and stifle freedom of expression. Under the 2014 military junta, the National Council for Peace and Order (NCPO), jurisdiction over Section 112 cases was transferred to military courts, often resulting in secret trials and disproportionately harsh sentences. Between 2017 and 2020, the government briefly refrained from invoking Section 112, instead relying on the Computer Crimes Act and sedition provisions to prosecute perceived insults to the monarchy. The law was formally revived in November 2020 following growing pro-democracy protests.

In 2023, the Supreme Court of Thailand imposed a lifetime political ban on Pannika Wanich, a former Move Forward Party parliamentarian, citing her lèse-majesté-related social media posts as grounds for disqualification. On 7 August 2024, the Constitutional Court issued a landmark decision banning the Move Forward Party—which had won the 2023 general election—and all of its leaders from politics, declaring that its proposal to reform Section 112 "posed a threat to the constitutional monarchy and national order."

In January 2024, the Chiang Rai Provincial Court sentenced activist Mongkhon Thirakot to 50 years' imprisonment for sharing online messages and Facebook posts deemed defamatory to the monarchy—the longest sentence ever imposed in a lèse-majesté case in Thai legal history, surpassing the previous record of 43 years handed down in 2021.

== History ==
=== Origin and early developments ===
In the feudal era, monarchs, royal officials, royal symbols, and wrongdoings in the palace were protected from many kinds of "violation". Crimes against royal symbols greatly affected the social structure of the sakdina era.

The oldest version of lèse-majesté law was in the modern defamation law of 1900, enacted to protect the monarch's reputation. It made acts against the king acts against the state.

The Siamese criminal code of 1908 separated the King and the state. It penalised persons who displayed malice or defamed the King, the Queen Consort, the Heir-apparent, or the Regent. Anyone doing so was subject to imprisonment not exceeding seven years or fines of not more than 5,000 baht, or both. Other sections provided protection from displays of malice or defamation of "the princes or princesses from whichever reign" or from those who "create disloyalty" or "insult the king", and "cause the people to transgress the royal laws".

As the print media was becoming widespread, the criminal code was strengthened in 1928 to penalise crimes of "advocates or teachers of any political or economic doctrine or system, intended or calculated to bring into hatred or contempt the Sovereign".

Lèse-majesté law did not change significantly after the 1932 Siamese Revolution, because the Khana Ratsadon compromised and added the inviolable status of the king in the Constitution, which continues to the present day. However, the law included an exclusion clause for "an expression of good faith" or "a critical and unbiased comment on governmental or administrative acts". During that time, discussion about the monarchy was still free. This allowed discussion over whether Thailand be a constitutional monarchy in 1949, and a 1956 lecture by a legal scholar which said the king should not express an opinion on economic, political and social problems with no countersign.

=== 1957 changes: criminalisation of insult ===
[I]t might not be true, and even if it were true, [it] should not be publicized as there is no legislation that allows it. And regarding the institution of the monarchy, it should be revered by the people, in an inviolable status, always above any criticism. — A Court decision in 1986, ruling that gossip could be lèse-majesté even if it were true.

On 1 January 1957, the criminal code of 1956 came into force. Since then, lèse-majesté forbade insult, in addition to the existing crimes of threats or defamation. The change broadly expanded the applicability of the law. Lèse-majesté was changed from an offence against the monarchy to an offence against national security, removing the right to express opinions which might be insulting to the monarchy if said within the spirit of the constitution.

Claiming national security, Thai Cold War dictator Sarit Thanarat used lèse-majesté charges to suppress political opponents, leading to some executions. He also handed over lèse-majesté cases to courts-martial.

Court decisions shortly after the change still took context into consideration. In December 1957, a case against a politician was dismissed because a political campaign was underway.

=== Change after the 6 October 1976 massacre ===
On 21 October 1976, two weeks after the 6 October 1976 massacre and the same day coup by the National Administrative Reform Council (NARC), led by Admiral Sangad Chaloryu, NARC issued Order No.41 that including Article 112 revision to strengthen defamation laws as they explained in the order that current laws had been unsuitable for the unstable political situation at that time. They mentioned the Monarchy and religion for example. In Order No.41, the penalty for lèse-majesté was increased from a maximum of seven years imprisonment to three to fifteen years per count. Other than the Empire of Japan during World War II, Thailand is the only constitutional monarchy that strengthened lèse-majesté in the 20th century.

Between 1977 and 1986 when the royal power base grew among the urban middle class, the "kinship" and "bond" relationship was created between the people and the king as well as its modern "inviolable" status. Since then, court decisions and legal scholars' comments have interpreted the lèse-majesté law to mean the king could not be criticized in any way.

Examples of cases of insult include a politician, in 1988, who served four years in prison for suggesting that life would have been easier had he been born in the palace, and a man in 1976 who was arrested on charges of lèse-majesté for using a royal village scout scarf to wipe a table. Acts deemed insulting to the royal image include placing photographs of anybody on a website above those of the king. In March 2007, Oliver Jufer, a Swiss man, was sentenced to 10 years in prison for spray-painting graffiti over five posters of King Bhumibol while drunk in Chiang Mai, although he received a royal pardon the following month.

=== Political weaponisation ===
Lèse-majesté cases filed in Thailand, 2007–17
Year	No. of cases
2007	36
2008	55
2009	104
2010	65
2011	37
2012	25
2013	57
2014	99
2015	116
2016	101
2017 (9 mo.)	45

Between 1990 and 2005, there was an average of five new lèse-majesté cases per year. Since then, however, there have been at least 400 cases—an estimated 1,500 per cent increase. Prior to the 2006 coup, targets of lèse-majesté were mostly politicians, high-ranking bureaucrats and extra-constitutional figures, but after 2007, common people were charged. The law was interpreted to cover past monarchs and symbols associated with the monarch. No one had been sentenced to more than ten years in jail before 2007. Observers attributed the increasing number of lèse-majesté cases to King Bhumibol's public invitation of criticism in 2005, increased polarization following the 2006 military coup, and to speculation over his declining health in the period before his death in 2016.

In 2005, cases registered in the Attorney General's office rose sharply from 12 new cases in 2000–2004 to 17. Thai Rak Thai and Democrat Party as well as opposition movement People's Alliance for Democracy traded lèse-majesté accusations. Former prime minister Thaksin Shinawatra's alleged lèse-majesté was one of the stated reasons for the Thai military's 2006 coup. After the coup, dozens of radio stations were shut down because of alleged lèse-majesté.

Academics have been investigated, imprisoned and forced into exile over accusations of lèse-majesté. Prominent historian Somsak Jeamteerasakul was arrested for proposing an eight-point plan to reform of the monarchy. Giles Ji Ungpakorn went into exile in 2007 after his book, A Coup for the Rich, questioned Bhumibol's role in the 2006 coup. In March 2011, Worachet Pakeerat, a law lecturer, banded together with same-minded lecturers and formed the Nitirat Group, aiming to amend the lèse-majesté law. He proposed reducing the maximum jail term to three years, a circumstance for pardoning, and that only the Office of His Majesty's Principal Private Secretary could file a complaint. His actions angered many people. In February 2012, he was assaulted in broad daylight in Bangkok.

During the government of Yingluck Shinawatra, the number of arrests and convictions for lèse-majesté offences declined significantly. However, she said she would not seek to reform the law. There were 478 cases in 2010.

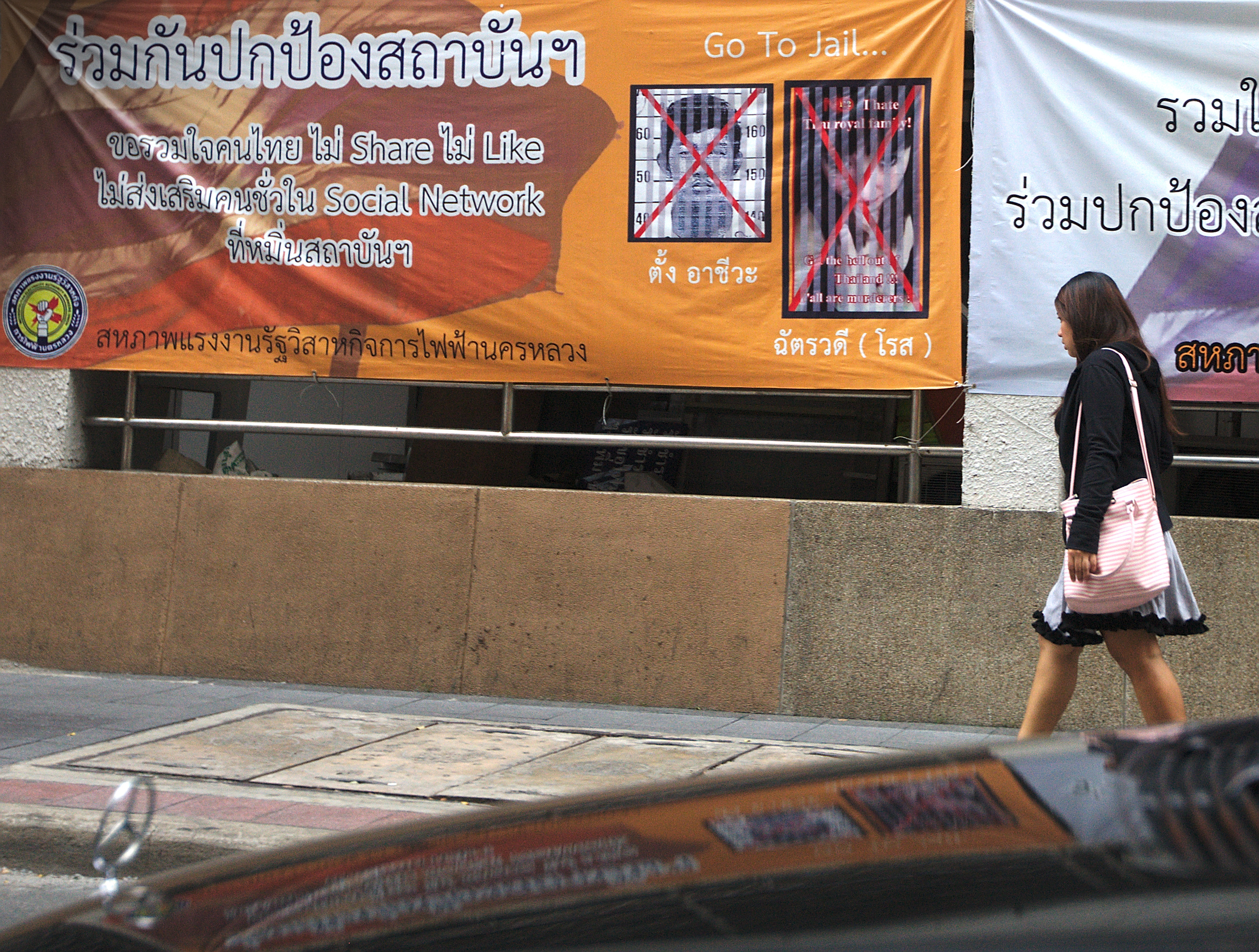
A banner in Bangkok warns readers that using social media to "like" or "share" anti-monarchist content could land them in prison. The banner asks people to "join together to protect the monarchy".

In May 2014, the National Council for Peace and Order (NCPO), the military junta, granted authority to a military tribunal to prosecute lèse-majesté in Thailand. Military courts routinely imposed harsher sentences than civilian courts would. In August 2015, the Bangkok Military Court sentenced Pongsak Sriboonpeng to 60 years in prison for his six Facebook postings (later reduced to 30 years, when he pleaded guilty). This was Thailand's longest recorded sentence for lèse-majesté. The courts were dubbed "kangaroo courts." The military government has never successfully extradited someone living abroad.

iLaw, a Thai non-profit organisation, reported that the junta hold persons in custody for seven days without charges. Secret trials were held. Officials seized personal communication devices to search for incriminating evidence.

In December 2014, the parents of Srirasmi Suwadee, formerly a Thai princess, were sentenced for "insulting the royal family and lodging a malicious claim".

In 2015, Prachatai published an infographic showing that bathroom graffiti, a hand gesture, a hearsay report of a taxi conversation, and not standing during the playing of the royal anthem, among other things, could be punished as acts of lèse-majesté. A nurse wearing black on Bhumibol Adulyadej's birthday was charged with lèse-majesté.

The last formal attempt to amend the law occurred in May 2012 when more than 10,000 people signed a petition to parliament, but Speaker of the House of Representatives, Somsak Kiatsuranont, dismissed it citing that amendment of the law concerning the monarchy was not a constitutional right.

=== Enforcement under King Vajiralongkorn ===
Following the ascension of King Vajiralongkorn to the throne in 2016, the enforcement of Thailand’s lèse-majesté law intensified under the military junta government, the National Council for Peace and Order (NCPO). In December 2016, activist Jatupat Boonpattararaksa, a member of the rights group Dao Din, was arrested and charged with lèse-majesté after sharing a BBC Thai biography of the new monarch on Facebook. Despite over 2,600 others having shared the same article, Jatupat was the only individual prosecuted. Neither the publisher, BBC Thai, nor other sharers faced legal action. In May 2017, the NCPO further expanded the law's scope, declaring that even viewing royal-related content deemed offensive could constitute lèse-majesté and be subject to prosecution. As of November 2018, at least 127 people had been charged with lèse-majesté since the 2014 coup.

In 2017, Thai authorities charged a 14-year-old boy with lèse-majesté for allegedly burning a royal arch in Khon Kaen, marking the first known prosecution of a minor under the law. A lawyer in the case argued that the court lacked impartiality, as proceedings were carried out in the name of the King, who was a party with a vested interest. In many low-profile cases, authorities opted for extrajudicial intimidation rather than formal prosecution—holding suspects in military custody for seven days, inspecting personal devices, pressuring them to unfollow particular Facebook pages, or compelling them to record videos pledging loyalty to the monarchy.

As of November 2017, 38 cases (34.2%) of all lèse-majesté prosecutions were handled in military courts.

A directive from the Attorney General's Office, dated 21 February 2018, stipulated that only the Attorney General himself could authorize lèse-majesté prosecutions. In June 2018, new regulations permitted prosecutors to dismiss cases not deemed to serve the public interest. Subsequently, several cases were dismissed even when defendants had pleaded guilty, and bail was granted in some lèse-majesté trials—an unprecedented development. Nevertheless, authorities increasingly substituted the use of Section 112 with other statutes such as the Computer Crime Act or sedition law. On 15 June 2020, Prime Minister Prayut Chan-o-cha stated publicly that the King had requested a cessation of prosecutions under Section 112.

Following the forced disappearance of exiled activist Wanchalearm Satsaksit in June 2020—himself accused of lèse-majesté—the hashtag #ยกเลิก112 ("Repeal 112") trended nationwide on Twitter with over 500,000 retweets, as many believed the charges against him were a factor in his abduction. By August 2020, during the height of the anti-government demonstrations, calls to reform the monarchy and abolish Article 112 became central among protest demands.

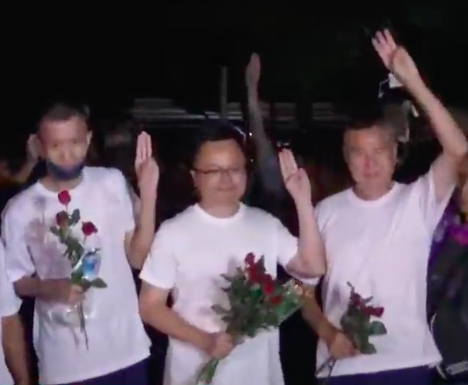
Lèse-majesté defendants Ekachai Hongkangwan, Arnon Nampa, and Somyot Prueksakasemsuk received bail on 2 November 2020.

In January 2021, Anchan Preelerd received the harshest lèse-majesté sentence in Thai history—87 years in prison—for uploading and sharing online talk show videos. After pleading guilty, her sentence was reduced by half to 43.5 years. The United Nations Human Rights Committee later declared that "imprisonment is never an appropriate penalty" for such cases.

In the same year, opposition leader Thanathorn Juangroongruangkit was charged with lèse-majesté after he criticized the government's COVID-19 vaccine procurement strategy for relying heavily on Siam Bioscience, a company owned by the King, despite its lack of prior vaccine experience. The Royal Thai Police charged him following his 18 January 2021 Facebook Live broadcast. The Technology Crime Suppression Division ordered the removal of the video. In August 2021, Thanathorn faced two additional lèse-majesté charges for the same incident.

By late 2021, Prime Minister Prayut had revived active enforcement of the lèse-majesté law in response to the ongoing protests. Prominent protest leaders—including Arnon Nampa, Parit Chiwarak, Panupong Jadnok, Jatupat Boonpattararaksa, Panusaya Sithijirawattanakul, Pimsiri Petchnamrob, and Benja Apan—were detained for extended periods, with some held cumulatively for over 300 days. Since November 2020, at least 173 people have been charged under the law.

On 14 May 2024, activist Netiporn Sanesangkhom, died in custody following a prolonged hunger strike protesting political imprisonment and judicial injustice.

After the 2023 Thai general election, the Move Forward Party, led by Pita Limjaroenrat—which won the most parliamentary seats—was barred from forming a coalition government due to its platform advocating the amendment of Section 112. In January 2024, the Constitutional Court ordered the party to cease any effort to reform the law. Subsequently, in August 2024, the Court ordered the dissolution of the Move Forward Party.

== Statistics ==
Statistics of lèse-majesté cases in Thailand
Year	New cases	Conviction
1984–1989	30	15/19 (78.95%)
1990–1994	26	18/19 (94.74%)
1995–1999	32	21/23 (91.30%)
2000–2005	29	15/16 (93.75%)

== Social context and impact ==
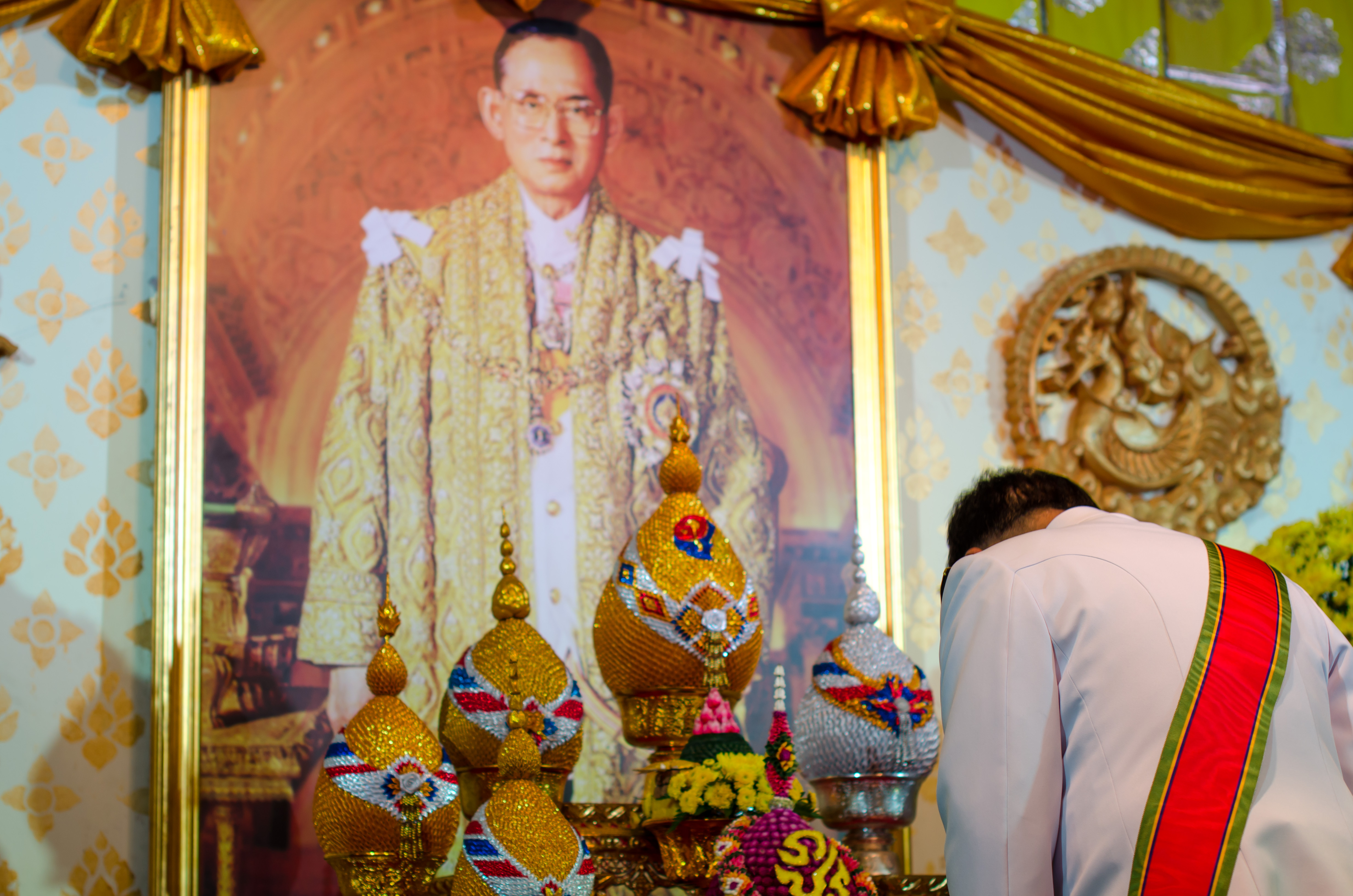
The late King Bhumibol Adulyadej was accorded an almost divine reverence, which still holds true today.

According to King Rama IV, insults to the king are also insults to his power source—the people. The king felt every subject is also insulted.

David Streckfuss, a scholar on Thai human rights and politics, commented that lèse-majesté is one factor defining neo-absolutism in Thailand. Lèse-majesté is used in less democratic monarchies to protect the system of power. Thai mainstream media has supported the use of the law and avoid covering it. The media do not discuss the role of the monarchy in politics, thus creating a distorted view of the political scene. Lèse-majesté and communism were once the definition of the ultimate traitor. With the decline of communism, however, lèse-majesté began to define new kinds of traitors.

Michael Kelly Connors, a professor in social science at the University of Nottingham, wrote the king had a dual position—an agent of political and economic interests and the soul of the nation showing the glaring disparity between social classes, and thus required controlled imagery. The stage-managed role of the monarch, the compulsory respect shown to the institution, and the pressure of social conformity left many people with a taste of bitterness which few felt confident to express. Thai elites feared the Thai monarchy would be subjected to mockery once it was open to scrutiny, just like the British monarchy.

Streckfuss and Preechasilpakul wrote that lèse-majesté remains the most potent political charge in Thailand and the number of charges increased in times of political upheaval. Human rights groups say the lèse-majesté laws have been used as a political weapon to stifle free speech. Political scientist Giles Ungpakorn noted that "the lèse-majesté laws are not really designed to protect the institution of the monarchy. In the past, the laws have been used to protect governments and to shield military coups from lawful criticism. This whole [royal] image is created to bolster a conservative elite well beyond the walls of the palace." However, Connors argued that while some have used it as a political weapon, it has always been in the interests of the palace.

== Contemporary scope of the law ==
Article 112 of the Criminal Code is a legislation which supports Article 8 of the Constitution (Note: It reads: "The King shall be enthroned in a position of revered worship and shall not be violated. No person shall expose the King to any sort of accusation or action.") for practical implementation, so there are no grounds to claim it violates or is inconsistent with Article 8 of the Constitution. — A Constitutional Court decision in 2012.

Comparison of lèse-majesté laws
Country	Maximum jail term (years)
Netherlands	0.3
Denmark	1
Spain	2
Morocco	3
Norway	5
Sweden	6
Thailand	15

Section 112 of Thai Criminal Code currently reads as follows:

"Whoever defames, insults or threatens the King, the Queen, the Heir-apparent or the Regent, shall be punished with imprisonment of three to fifteen years."

As lèse-majesté is one of the offences relating to the security of the kingdom, according to Section 7 of the Thai Criminal Code. Even alleged offences committed outside the kingdom can be punished within Thailand. Thai courts have demonstrated they will prosecute and jail even non-Thai citizens for offences committed outside of the kingdom as proven in the case against American citizen Joe Gordon who police arrested in May 2011 when he visited Thailand for medical treatment. The court later sentenced him to five years in jail.

David Streckfuss opined that lèse majesté law is not necessarily controversial, even some Western democratic countries seem to have severe jail punishment, if rarely used.

In 2007, a controversy arose over whether criticism of members of King Bhumibol's privy council also constituted criticism of Bhumibol. Police Special Branch Commander Lt Gen Theeradech Rodpho-thong, who refused to file charges of lèse-majesté against activists who launched a petition to oust Privy Council President Prem Tinsulanonda, was demoted within days of the incident by Police Commander Seripisut Temiyavet.

The Supreme Court of Thailand ruled in a 2013 case that lèse-majesté also applies to past monarchs, arguing that "defaming the current king can affect the current king," specifically because the monarch criticised, King Mongkut, is the great-grandfather of the then-reigning monarch King Bhumibol Adulyadej. They also cited natural security concerns, as "[p]eople still revere and worship kings after they are deceased," so lèse-majesté against prior monarchs "may lead to dissatisfaction" among the people.

In 2013, a man was found guilty of "preparing and attempting" to commit an act of lèse-majesté. He had images and captions deemed lèse-majesté in his electronic device—which, his accusers said, potentially could have been spread online. He was found guilty despite the law providing that mere preparation of the act is not a legal offence.

In 2016, a singer and activist, in addition to his prison sentence for defaming the monarchy, was ordered to write a song promoting "national reconciliation" after completing his sentence. The court order to write a song is outside the scope of the punishments in the Criminal Code.

Comments on the sufficiency economy theory published by King Bhumibol Adulyadej can also lead to lèse-majesté prosecution, as in the case of Udom Taepanich in 2024.

Because of the uncertain and unpredictable nature of the offence charges, defendants often do not contest them and plead guilty. Lèse-majesté leads to self-censorship and vigilantism.

=== Legal proceedings ===
In 2013, a person filed lèse-majesté charges against his own brother, showing how easily the law can be misused, and that the law has now become a potential weapon in family feuds. Often the police, courts, and prosecutors are afraid they will be accused of disloyalty to the monarch if they fail to prosecute allegations of lèse-majesté. Additionally, there are cyberbullying cases where fake accounts were created and lèse-majesté material was posted to create misunderstanding that the person actually committed a crime.

Article 14 of the Computer Crimes Act BE 2550 (2007), which broadly bars the circulation through computer systems of information and material deemed detrimental to national security, has also been used to prosecute cases of lèse-majesté.

There have been occasions when lèse-majesté cases have been transferred to court-martial, most recently during the National Council for Peace and Order regime after the 2014 coup. There are differences between court-martial decisions compared to civilian court ones, including protection of any previous monarchs. Alleged counts are considered separately, making the punishment twice as harsh; the right to bail is restricted in wartime. Even so, pre-trial detentions are widespread and requests for bail are difficult; recent offenders used hunger strike to highlight the issue.

Detainees are seen barefoot and shackled at the ankles when brought to court. The courts sometimes use videoconferencing systems for court proceedings, so that defendants do not have to be physically present in the court. Two detainees have died in military custody. One hanged himself, and the other died of a blood infection, according to his autopsy.

Judges have also said the accuser did not necessarily have to prove the information was factual claiming, "because if it is true, it is more defamatory, and if it isn't true, then it's super-defamatory". Asked why the Criminal Court did not grant the benefit of the doubt to the defendant in the case of Ampon Tangnoppakul, Court of Justice spokesperson Sitthisak Wanachaikit replied:

When the public prosecutor who institutes the proceedings can exercise his burden of proof to the extent of bringing to light the evil intent of the defendant...the defendant needs to be punished according to the gravity of the case.

Professor Peter Leyland of SOAS, University of London and Professor Emeritus of London Metropolitan University, explained:

It [the lese majeste offence] can be committed entirely without criminal intent. There is no need for the prosecuting authorities to bring any evidence to bear relating to foresight on the part of the defendant with regard to the fact of the statement or conduct. [...] The police, prosecuting authorities and judges not only act in the name of the King, but there is an expectation that their loyalty to the Crown will be reflected in an outcome that confirms the dignity of the King at the expense of the accused.

Pointing that Article 112 was typically deployed with politically expedient timing, rather than at the time of the supposed offence, Jakrapob Penkair, a former minister to the Office of the Prime Minister who was charged with lèse-majesté himself, commented: "It's not about your action; it's about the timing. They wait until the moment when you seem most vulnerable."

Court proceedings are lengthy, and defendants often pleading guilty as the quickest route to freedom. Court decisions are often overturned in the higher courts, thus lengthening the proceedings. Civilian courts often handed sentences of five years imprisonment per count, while military courts often handed sentences of 10 years per count.

== Government measures ==
=== Internet censorship ===
The Office of Prevention and Suppression of Information Technology Crimes maintains a "war room" to monitor for pages which disparage the monarchy. A web crawler is used to search the internet. When an offending image or language is found, the office obtains a court order blocking the site. On 28 October 2008, The Ministry of Information and Communication Technology (MICT) announced plans to spend about 100–500 million baht to build a gateway to block websites with contents defaming the royal institution.

In 2008, more than 4,800 webpages deemed insulting to Thailand's royal family were blocked. In December 2010, nearly 60,000 websites had been banned for alleged insults against Bhumibol. In 2011, the number increased to 70,000.

On 4 April 2007, the Thai government blocked Thai access to YouTube as a result of a video clip which it deemed insulting to the king.

The website of Same Sky Books, publishers of Same Sky magazine, was shut down after comments on its bulletin board questioned mainstream media's claims that the entire country was in mourning over the death of Princess Galyani Vadhana.

In December 2015, the court verdict against Chiranuch Premchaiporn, webmaster of the news website Prachatai, was upheld in the highest court: "an eight-month suspended jail sentence and a 20,000 baht fine". Previously, she had been jailed without bail for nearly a year for not removing—in 2008—an allegedly insulting comment from an article fast enough. Although the comments did not directly mention Bhumibol or members of his family, the court found that Chiranuch displayed an intent to insult. Arrested in September 2010, she could face up to 50 years' imprisonment if found guilty.

In 2016, Facebook blocked users in Thailand from accessing a page satirising Thailand's royal family, citing the lèse-majesté law. Around the same time, there was speculation that the junta was able to obtain private chat logs of Facebook users.

In 2019, the Facebook page "Royalist Marketplace" was launched as a forum by academic Pavin Chachavalpongpun to discuss and criticise the Thai monarchy freely. The Thai authorities shut down access in Thailand to the Facebook page, which has accumulated around one million users. Facebook may be appealing, while Chachavalpongpun is facing a charge of cybercrime. He has since launched a replacement Facebook page.

=== Abuse of psychiatry ===
On 9 July 2020, Tiwagorn Withiton, a Facebook user who went viral after posting a picture of himself wearing a t-shirt printed with the message, "I lost faith in the monarchy" was forcibly detained by police officers and admitted to Rajanagarindra Psychiatric Hospital in Khon Kaen. Tiwagorn is quoted as saying, "I well understand that it is political to have to make people think I'm insane. I won't hold it against the officials if there is a diagnosis that I'm insane, because I take it that they have to follow orders." He was discharged about two weeks later.

== Opinion ==
=== Support ===
The stated rationale for supporting lèse-majesté often center around Thai identity and the presence of lèse-majesté and crimes against head of state law in other countries.

Borwornsak Uwanno, Thai legal scholar, said that countries limited free speech according to their cultural-legal circumstances. In May 2016, justice minister Paiboon Koomchaya remarked on "concerns raised by United Nations Security Council member countries during the Universal Periodic Review (UPR) in Geneva" on 11 May 2016: "that foreign countries would not understand why Thailand needs the lèse-majesté law because they are not "civilised" nations with cultural refinement like ours".

A Thai official said that the lèse-majesté law is similar to a libel law for commoners. Some abuse their rights by spreading hate speech or distorted information to incite hatred towards the monarchical institution. He also assert that those who are accused of lèse-majesté have the right to a fair trial, and the opportunity to contest the charges and assistance from a lawyer, as well as the right to appeal.

An attorney said lèse-majesté does not go against democracy and does not know why there is activism around the law.

The Rubbish Collection Organization, a fascist ultra-royalist organization, supports persecution for lèse-majesté, and launched an ongoing online campaign of mobbing and doxxing victims, together with other methods of intimidation.

A judge in a 2016 lèse-majesté case, when a man was sentenced to seven years and six months in prison said he would have given him a longer sentence, but the court's deputy president advised him on giving a shorter term.

=== Opposition ===
The lèse-majesté law is described as "draconian". Amnesty International considers anyone jailed for insulting Bhumibol to be a political prisoner; if they had a peaceful expression and intent, a prisoner of conscience.

Sulak Sivaraksa, a Thai social activist, said that he felt sad that most Thai intellectuals did not see any harm in this law, calling them "docile livestock."

The United Nations Special Rapporteur on the Promotion and Protection of the Right to Freedom of Opinion and Expression, David Kaye, commenting "Public figures, including those exercising the highest political authority, may be subject to criticism, and the fact that some forms of expression are considered to be insulting to a public figure is not sufficient to justify restrictions or penalties." Kaye went on to say that such laws, "have no place in a democratic country" and called for Thailand to repeal them.

In November 2015, Glyn T. Davies, the US ambassador to Thailand, gave a speech criticising the long prison sentences handed to those found guilty of lèse-majesté. Police then investigated him.

Activists against the law or those who seek to reform it include: Mainueng Kor Kunatee (a poet who was assassinated in 2014); Somsak Jeamteerasakul; Giles Ji Ungpakorn; Pavin Chachavalpongpun, a former diplomat, and an associate professor at the Kyoto University and a leader of a campaign to abolish Article 112 of the Thai criminal code; and The Nitirat group—an association of law lecturers who campaign for constitutional reform and a change of Thailand's lèse-majesté law—including Worachet Pakeerut, Piyabutr Saengkanokkul, and Sawatree Suksri.

During the 2020–2021 Thai protests, demands on reform of the monarchy, which included reform or abolition of lèse-majesté law, were part of the protest goals.

=== Satirical reaction ===
Not The Nation, an anonymous website that satirises a Thai newspaper, The Nation, satirised the media and the public response to the case of Thai American Joe Gordon in contrast to that paid to the drug-related case of Australian Schapelle Corby and to the pardoning of Greek-Cypriot-Australian Harry Nicolaides. NTN later satirised plea bargaining in the "Uncle SMS" case. In December 2013, NTN circumvented the chilling effect of LMIT on discussion of succession with a discussion of the abdication of royal dog Thong Daeng.

In July 2014, British comedian John Oliver described Crown Prince Vajiralongkorn as a "buffoon" and showed the leaked video of Vajiralongkorn and his topless wife celebrating the birthday of the prince's poodle, Air Chief Marshal Foo Foo, in a satirical piece about monarchy in general on Last Week Tonight with John Oliver. The Thai military government described Oliver as "undermining the royal institution", to which Oliver responded by saying: "It seems my Thailand vacation is going to have to be postponed very much indefinitely. If I can bring down your monarchy, you have—at best—a wobbly monarchy."

== Related controversies ==
The Charoen Pokphand (CP) group is alleged to have supported Section 112 via a CP Freshmart marketing discount campaign that ran from 12–15 February 2021 titled "LOVE112" that offered a 112 baht discount for online purchases worth at least 666 baht.

== Abolition campaign ==
On 5 November 2021, the law activist group iLaw launched the first ever campaign to abolish Section 112 of the Penal Code through an initiative petition. The petition attracted more than 100,000 subscribers overnight, despite Thai law merely requiring 10,000 signatures for the petition to be submitted to the parliament.

== See also ==
- List of prosecuted lèse majesté cases in Thailand
- Censorship in Thailand
- Cyber Scouts (Thailand)
- Human rights in Thailand
- Red Gaurs
- Rubbish Collection Organization
- Nawaphon
- Social Sanction (Thailand)
- Netiporn Sanesangkhom, an activist who died during a hunger strike in 2024, opposed to the lèse-majesté laws
- Abolition of monarchy

== Literature ==
- Arnott, David; Franke, Peter (1993). "Majestätsbeleidigung, Sulak und die thailändischen Generäle". Südostasien informationen (in German). 9 (2): 37. doi:10.11588/soai.1993.2.8336.
- Chachavalpongpun, Pavin (2011). "Lese-majeste: An anachronistic but potent weapon". East Asia Forum Quarterly. 3 (4): 26.
- Greenfield, Kate (2013). "The Runaway Lese Majeste Train: How Thailand's Lese Majeste Law Must Be Reformed in Order to Stop Its Abuse". Southwestern Journal of International Law. 19: 377.
- Haberkorn, Tyrell (2016). "A Hyper-Royalist Parapolitics in Thailand". Bijdragen tot de Taal-, Land- en Volkenkunde. 172 (2–3): 225–248. doi:10.1163/22134379-17202003. hdl:1885/152278.
- Streckfuss, David (1995). "Kings in the Age of Nations: The Paradox of Lese-Majeste as Political Crime in Thailand". Comparative Studies in Society and History. 37 (3): 445–475. doi:10.1017/S0010417500019769. ISSN 0010-4175. JSTOR 179215. S2CID 144930385.
- David Streckfuss (2011), Truth on Trial in Thailand: Defamation, Treason and Lèse-majesté, Routledge, ISBN 978-0-415-41425-8
- Van Reuben, Regina (2018). "Majestätsbeleidigung im Königreich Thailand". Südostasien informationen (in German): 11. doi:10.11588/soai.1984.0.3947.
