= Reactions to the 2020 Thai protests =

This is a description of domestic and international reactions to the 2020 Thai protests.

== State response and arrests ==
Thai authorities have summoned university chancellors to order them to prevent students from demanding monarchy reform and to draw up lists of student protest leaders, warning that student demands could lead to violence, specifically referencing the Thammasat University Massacre of student protesters by far-right paramilitary groups and the 1992 Black May massacre by the Thai military. An Isaan Record analysis found that the government response has included force and intimidation, arbitrary detention, arrests and charges, disinformation, the deployment of military Information and Operations (information warfare) units, media censorship, delaying tactics, obfuscation, support for pro-government groups, gaslighting, and negotiation. In late August, it was reported that the Government Public Relations Department of Thailand had released two propaganda videos on YouTube attacking the protesters, leading to a reaction on social media accusing the government office of creating disunity. They were later denied access. The existence of an information warfare unit participating in a cyber campaign against government critics was leaked to the public in late February 2020.

General Apirat Kongsompong, the Commander-in-Chief of the Royal Thai Army, expressed concerns that some students' actions were inclined to lèse majesté. He cried while vowing his loyalty to the King. In a Facebook post, Colonel Nutsara Woraphatharathorn, former spokesperson of the Royal Thai Army, dubbed the protesters “Mob Mung Ming” (ม็อบมุ้งมิ้ง; lit. 'adorable mob'). Her action was widely criticised for being partisan. The term Mob Mung Ming was later used in many protests; one organised by the Seri Thoey group on 25 July also incorporated the term in its event's name. Public Health Minister Anutin Charnvirakul, a notable politician from a junior coalition partner, expressed concern about implications for COVID-19 spread whilst signaling that he was neutral about the protestors' demands.

Some universities and schools responded by forbidding their staff and students to join the protests and by banning gathering on their grounds, claiming COVID-19 concerns. Satri Phatthalung School in Phatthalung Province was sent a warning by the local police. On 23 July, the dean of Prince of Songkhla University, Pattani Province Campus warned the students not to organise a demonstration on its grounds. The protest, however, went on and called for the dean's resignation in addition to the three demands. On 18 August, a department in the Ministry of Education allowed rallies in its schools, only forbidding outsiders to join.

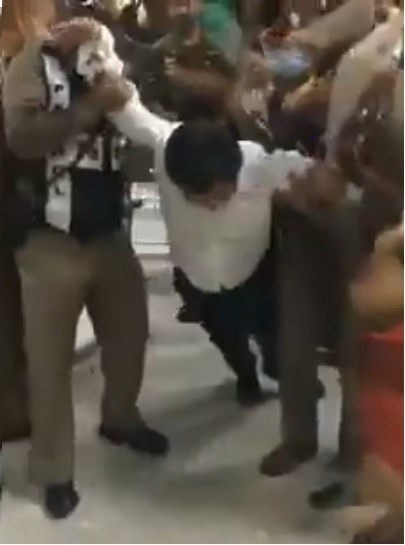
Arnon Nampa unwillingly dragged on 7 August.

On 7 August, watchdog organization iLaw reported at least 78 incidents of intimidation of protest sympathizers. Anon Nampa (Thai: อานนท์ นำภา), a leading figure of the protest, was arrested on multiple charges, including sedition, after giving a public speech calling for monarchy reforms. His arrest warrant, however, cited his participation in 18 July protest. Another Free Youth leader was also arrested. Amnesty International Thailand released a statement demanding removal of all charges and protection of the right to protest. On 9 August, five youth leaders in Phitsanulok Province were arrested without charge. An unnamed Thai police source reported that they were kept in custody in a Border Patrol Police camp to dissuade a local protest event. One female member said she was approached by the officers at her dormitory. On 14 August, student leader Parit Chiwarak was arrested on the outskirts of Bangkok. Police officers showed an arrest warrant, then carried him into a vehicle.

External videos
- Arrest of student leader Parit Chiwarak on 14 August (3:09, in Thai), YouTube video.

The Asia Times quoted a government official stating that the King was not bothered by the "children's" protests and that they should be able to express their views. This position may be contradicted by an Al Jazeera article, stating that there were reports that the Thai monarchy has asked Thai media to censor any mention of the ten demands.

On 20 August, nine were arrested and later released on bail, including Anon Nampa, who was arrested for the second time. Officers reportedly visited the home of a three-year-old who had displayed a The Hunger Games-style three-finger salute. A police document stating that mobile jamming devices were used on 23 August was leaked to the media. The police confirmed the authenticity. In late August, student groups reported that at least 109 schools had suppressed or intimidated political expression. On 25 August, police arrested four student leaders, Arnon Nampa, Suwanna Tanlek, Parit Chiwarak and Piyarat Jongthep, for multiple charges, including sedition. On 28 August 15 further activists were charged. In early September, the police summonsed the first schoolchild protester for violating the Emergency Decree and the Public Assembly Act.

On 24 August, in response to a Thai government order, Facebook blocked access in Thailand to the million-member main Facebook page critical of the monarchy, Royalist Marketplace, administered by self-exiled academic Pavin Chachavalpongpun. Hundreds of thousands had switched to a replacement page within hours, and the site had 900,000 members by 30 August. Facebook is challenging the order in the courts.

A few days before a scheduled mass student protest on 19 September, Thammasat University's faculty of law stated that state security had asked the university to close on that day.

The authorities attempted to block more than 2,200 websites ahead of the 19 September rally. Following the rally, Buddhipongse Punnakanta, Minister of Digital Economy and Society, filed a complaint with police to prosecute Facebook, Twitter, and YouTube for failing to delete posts in a timely manner, the first time the Computer Crimes Act has been used against foreign service providers.

Prayut blamed the protesters for further damaging the country's economy ahead of the planned 14 October rally.

On 16 October, the BBC reported that the Thai government had blocked access to Change.org after a petition calling for Germany to declare the King persona non grata attracted nearly 130,000 signatures.

After the declaration of a severe state of emergency, police moved to ban or block independent and critical media under the emergency decree, specifically Prachathai.com, The Reporters, The Standard, and Voice TV, together with the Free Youth movement Facebook page. The Free Youth and the United Front for Thammasat and Demonstration reacted by switching from their Facebook pages to the Telegram messaging app; government critic and former finance minister Thirachai Phuvanatnaranubala criticized police actions as regressing to "complete dictatorship". The police seized books criticizing the monarchy. Ministry of Digital Economy and Society stated it intended to prosecute internet service providers and online platforms which allows prohibited content. It also reported about 320,000 illegal messages. In response, the National Press Council of Thailand, the National Union of Journalists Thailand, the News Broadcasting Council of Thailand, the Online News Providers Association, the Thai Broadcast Journalists Association, and the Thai Journalists Association issued a joint statement opposing media freedom suppression and urged the government not to misuse the law by repressing the media, warning that lack of access to information could cause more people to join the demonstrations and destabilize the political situation, risking violence. Thammasat University's faculty of journalism and mass communications issued a similar statement, insisting on access to information as a basic right and urging the government to permit the media operate independently.

On 18 October, House Speaker Chuan Leekpai asked parliament officials to schedule an unofficial meeting with government and opposition representatives on 23 October to discuss an extraordinary parliamentary session, which would require a royal decree, to consider amending the constitution. Conditional on royal approval, the Thai Cabinet has backed the proposal for a two-day extraordinary meeting from 26 October.

On 21 October, the Ministry of Foreign Affairs briefed foreign diplomats and required them to obtain advance permission to observe protests. The same day, Prayut suggested the impasse be resolved by lifting the state of emergency and through dialogue via the special parliamentary session. In response, protesters, who had moved towards Government House after assembling at Victory Monument, delivered an ultimatum to Prayut to release detained activists and resign within three days, or encounter renewed demonstrations. Nationally, tens of thousands of people, led by administrators, participated in pro-royalist parades, many held to officially commemorate to the 120th birthday anniversary of Princess Srinagarindra, the king's late grandmother.

On 22 October, the National Human Rights Commission welcomed the government's lifting the emergency decree and its stance of resolving the political conflict via parliamentary processes.

On 9 February, the Ratsadon group, Arnon, Parit, Panupong, Patipan Luecha, and Somyot were arrested and detained on charges of Lèse-majesté and 10 other offenses, including sedition, over 19–20 September protest by Pol Lt Col Chok-amnuay Wongboonrit, Chana Songkhram police. The court denied them bail, remanded them in the Bangkok Remand Prison. US National Security Advisor Jake Sullivan expressed concern. United Nations human rights experts condemned on rising lese-majeste cases. After the Court of Appeal, The court rejected a request and cited their disrespect for the monarchy and they posed a flight risk. In front of Bangkok Remand Prison, Prachak Kongkirati, Yukti Mukdawichit, Boonlert Wisetpreecha from Thammasat University and Puangthong Pawakrapan from Chulalongkorn University claiming to represent 255 lecturers at 31 universities and educations read out a statement calling for their release. Human Rights Watch said that the country may returns to the dark days by abusing the law and demanded the Thai government to conform with Thailand's international human rights law obligations.

On 8 March, Panusaya was arrested and the court denied her bail.

On 15 March, Arnon wrote the petition, fear of death threat, to the Criminal Court while he was temporarily released to perform his lawyer duty, that prison officials tried four times to take Jatupat and Panupong out to test COVID-19 at night which was an unusual time. Arnon found it suspicious and there was rumours that they will be sent to hurt or kill.

On 8 April, Arnon, Jatupat, and Somyot signed a letter expressing their intention to withdraw their lawyer from the trial because he cited lack of due fairness in the court so was therefore no longer required to defend them. While Patipan was released by bail, Parit and Panusaya had committed hunger strike until he get a bail.

On 23 April, Jatupat and Somyot were released on bail.

In May 2021 bail was granted to Parit, Panusaya and Chaiamorn Kaewwiboonpan.

On 1 June 2021, Panupong was released on bail from Bangkok Remand Prison, detained for 86 days.

On 6 June, Arnon was granted bail and released.

On 9 August, Arnon, Jatupat, Parit, and Panupong were revoked from bail. They have been in jail since 9 August until today on lese majeste and sedition charges.

On 7 October, Benja Apan was arrested on lèse majesté charge related to the 10 August 2021 'Car Mob' protest, demanding political and monarchy reform. She was denied bail and imprisoned await trial in Central Women Correctional Institution.

On 15 September, Panupong was released from the Thanyaburi Remand Prison. But later on 24 September 2021, Panupong has been denied bail and detained on Lèse-majesté charge filed for a Facebook post about monarchy reform. He has been detained at the Bangkok Remand Prison since then.

On 4 November, Benja Apan was sentenced to 6 months in prison on contempt of court on 29 April 2021, demanding the release of imprisoned activists. It was a maximum jail term according to her lawyer. Nutchanon Pairoj was sentenced to 4 months in prison, but was later released by bail.

== Support ==
In August, a Move Forward Party MP stated that some references to the monarchy in the protests (e.g. mockery, sarcastic comments, memes) are inconvenient truths that need attention. He received stark responses from Manager Online and General Apirat Kongsompong, who insisted that some protesters intended to overthrow the monarchy, or had fallen victim to some manipulators with such intent.

Two opposition members of parliament displayed the three-finger gesture in parliament to show support for the movements, the first being Move Forward Party MP Yanathicha Buapuean in late August, followed by Pheu Thai Party MP Anudith Nakornthap in early September Also in early September, the leader of the Pheu Thai Party, Sompong Amornwiwat, stated the motion from the opposition coalition to amend Article 256 was aligned with the demands of the protesters, who demanded a new constitution. On 9 September, the leader of the Move Forward Party, Pita Limjaroenrat, stated in parliament that the students in the movements wished to be free of Thailand's bureaucratic and educational systems. Both, he stated, are what prevent Thailand from moving forward because the Thai bureaucracy is inflexible and nepotistic, while the Thai education system is archaic, which results in students being exposed to authoritarianism.

Despite threats to their careers, many Thai celebrities have publicly expressed their support for the protesters. Some examples are Thai Miss Universe Maria Poonlertlarp, actress Intira Jaroenpura, popular Thai YouTuber Heart Rocker, film director Songyos Sugmakanan, actor and singer Perawat Sangpotirat, actor Sadanon Durongkaveroj, and blogger Amta Chittasenee. Five members of Thai idol girl group BNK48 have also voiced their support for the movements: 'Music' Praewa Suthamphong, 'Jennis' Jennis Oprasert, 'Khamin' Manipa Roopanya, 'Faii' Sumitra Duangkaew, and 'Kheng' Juthamas Khonta.

Regarding comments by Prime Minister Prayut that the student protesters were destroying their future employment opportunities by engaging in political activism, human resource specialist Sophon Phukaoluan countered that only those with political ambition or conflicts of interest would be affected.

A group of 147 university faculty members has issued a statement saying the protesters' demand of monarchical reform did not violate the law. The Thai Academic Network for Civil Rights, another group of 358 scholars, has also expressed full support for the protesters.

On 18 August, UNICEF issued a statement invoking the Convention on the Rights of the Child that called for schools and learning institutions to be safe havens and forums for children's freedom of expression and pointing out that children who are confronted with the law must receive support and experience appropriate juvenile proceedings, "without the use of violence, intimidation or threats".

On 31 August, the Embassy of Sweden in Bangkok voiced support for Thai-Swedish Maria Poonlertlarp for speaking out about democracy and equality.

Human rights group Amnesty International condemned the 15 October crackdown, as the protests were "overwhelmingly peaceful."

Rumours that Prayut would resign gathered pace in mid-October. The Severe State of Emergency led to a 17 October Khaosod English editorial calling for Prayut to resign on the basis he had lost all legitimacy. The editorial's analysis noted that police had attacked and dispersed protesters outside Government House on 15 October, while the protesters were dispersing as requested by protest leaders, and that any public challenges against Prayut's government were now banned and incurred up to two years in prison. It further noted that the authorities had threatened mass arrests, thereby indicating the government could no longer distinguish between protesters and criminals, and that the deployment of soldiers at Parliament and suspension of all sessions mentioning politics had effectively terminated legislative power. It further noted up to 101 law professors and political scientists had issued an open letter questioning the legality of the Severe State of Emergency due to the lack of a national security threat such as terrorism or widespread violence. The editorial criticized the level of violence in the police dispersal of peaceful demonstrators on 16 October and mass arrests and the arrest of an accredited reporter for its effect on media freedom.

On 19 October, the Bangkok Post editorial called for Prayut to "listen to the young" in order to defuse the increasing political tension to prevent it escalating into violence that could severely destabilize the entire country and urged him to address reform of the constitution and of the senate; it reiterated its call for the government to listen to youth on 25 October.

== The King's position ==
The King and the palace initially did not express any public opinion about the protests. In August, the Asia Times quoted a government official stating that the King was not bothered by the "children's" protests, but an Al Jazeera article reported that the Thai monarchy has asked Thai media to censor mention of the ten demands.

On 16 October, a speech by Vajiralongkorn the day before was made public, stating: "Now it is understood that the country needs people who love the country and love the monarchy". On 24 October, a video of the King praising former PDRC leader and ex-monk Buddha Issara and another counter-protester who raised a picture of late King Bhumibol Adulyadej during a protest was posted to a royalist Facebook group; royalists embraced it, while the protesters viewed the comment as a position statement, prompting the hashtag #23ตุลาตาสว่าง (23Oct Eyes Opened) to trend on the country's Twitter. He made the first public comment in November: that he "love them [Thai people] all the same," and "Thailand is the land of compromise."

Patrick Jory, a senior lecturer in Southeast Asian history at the University of Queensland, described the unpredictable nature of the King, "his willingness to use violence," and that he may pressured Prayut to suppress the protesters.

== Opposition ==
State-sponsored organized opposition to the protests emerged in August and included the accusation of a global conspiracy being funded or masterminded by foreign government or NGOs. On 10 August, the Thai Move Institute, which contains members of the People's Democratic Reform Committee, released a diagram of an alleged "people's revolution network" linking student protests to former Future Forward Party leader Thanathorn Juangroongruangkit and former prime minister Thaksin Shinawatra. In the same month, a pro-government Facebook page, 'Thailand Vision', asserted the existence of a 'global conspiracy' with the goal of overthrowing the Thai monarchy, alleged to be orchestrated by Amnesty International, Axel Springer, Bild, Business Insider, the Foreign Correspondents' Club of Thailand, the Friedrich Ebert Foundation, George Soros and the Open Society Foundations, the Heinrich Böll Foundation, Netflix, and many more. Some of its supporters cited support for watchdog organisation iLaw (Internet Law Reform Dialogue) by the US-based, non-profit, non governmental or quasi-autonomous non-governmental organization the National Endowment for Democracy as 'evidence' of the global conspiracy. On 30 August, approximately 1,000–1,200 mostly older royalists of the 'Thai Pakdee' (Loyal Thai) group, founded by right-wing politician Warong Dechgitvigrom, rallied in Bangkok and similarly alleged foreign 'interference'. On 31 August, the United States Embassy in Bangkok formally denied allegations of funding any protesters.

After the demands on monarchy reform were raised in early August, rightist media and organizations quickly attacked them. A Naewna columnist commented that the call to reform the monarchy is an act of evil, causing disunity, and undermining the monarchy under the disguise of protest against the government and for a constitutional amendment. The columnist also accused Pheu Thai and the former Future Forward Party of manipulating the protesters. Most politicians expressed a negative reaction to the demands, including Sudarat Keyuraphan, an influential Pheu Thai politician. On social media platforms such as Facebook, Twitter, and Instagram, user accounts, including ones coordinated by the state-sponsored, ultra-royalist, Rubbish Collection Organization, which has been characterized as fascist, (Note: See its characterisation in:) accuse the student protesters of being anti-monarchists, rebels, traitors, and human 'garbage'.

Opposition to high school students involvement include a minimum of 103 cases of harassment of students. Some online insults attacking female child protesters went so far as to urging their rape. In mid-September, the Bad Students group tweeted that some of its members had encountered family and financial problems for participating in the protests.

Phumiwat Raengkasiwit (ภูมิวัฒน์ แรงกสิวิทย์), an activist from the group Nawachiwin who had begun a hunger strike on 23 July in front of Sappaya-Sapasathan, the meeting place of the Thai parliament, to emphasize the extreme poverty due to COVID-19 mismanagement. However, on 18 August, it was reported that he had distanced himself from the Free Youth movement, accusing the protesters of foreign government and NGO support, while he himself was accused of being a police informer.

Many groups and individuals have condemned the protesting tactics, and some considered a protester's act of hurling paint at police officers to be violent. Opponents also find vulgar language used by protest leaders unacceptable.

On 16 September, Thailand's Constitutional Court accepted a complaint of treason against three leaders of the 10 August demonstration at Thammasat University filed by Nattaporn Toprayoon, an ultra-royalist. On 17 September, a small group of pro-government protesters came to the Thai Summit Building (office of Thanathorn's family business) claiming that Thanathorn was behind the protests.
