= Timeline of the 2020 Thai protests (August 2020) =

On 3 August, a Harry Potter-themed demonstration was held, openly criticised the monarchy, and demanded amendment of increasing royal prerogative and lèse majesté law. The protest, which 200 people joined, featured a public speech by Anon Nampa. Paul Chambers, Southeast Asian politics scholar, noted, "Such open criticism of Thailand’s monarch by non-elites at a public place within Thailand with the police simply standing by is the first of its kind in Thai history."

On 7 August, watchdog organisation iLaw launched a petition campaign to gather 50,000 names to amend the whole 2017 Constitution and draft a new constitution by elected constitutional assembly.

On 8 August, police received approval from the Bangkok Criminal Court to put prominent human rights lawyer Anon Nampa and democracy activist Panupong Jadnok in pre-trial detention at the Bangkok Remand Prison. They were arrested on 7 August in Bangkok on charges related to their involvement in the "Free Youth" rally. Reports suggested that police also targeted 31 other people, including many student movement leaders.

On 10 August, the Campaigning Group for Constitution of the People submitted a bill paving the way for a constitutional referendum. Meanwhile, there was a counter-protest by the Coordination Centre of Vocational Students for the Protection of National Institutions (CVPI) which accused the protesters of being manipulated to attack the government and the military, as well as criticising the monarchy, with an aim to cause a regime change. The group also vowed to set up their branches in all provinces and use a social pressure approach to dissuade the movement. Later that evening, there was a rally at Thammasat University, Rangsit campus in Pathum Thani Province named "ธรรมศาสตร์จะไม่ทน" (lit. Thammasat will not tolerate.) where students from numerous universities across a variety of protest groups participated while sympathetic vocational student groups volunteered to act as security. Totaling about 3,000 people, it was the largest rally in months. It employed the slogan "We don't want reforms; we want revolution." A labour union representative also gave a speech on economic inequality and broken promises by the government. Among the events were a speech by Anon Nampa, clips of political exile Pavin Chachavalpongpun, known for his stance on royal reform, and the declaration of ten demands to reform the monarchy under a constitutional monarchy. According to AP, the protesters at the site had mixed reaction to the demands.

On 14 August, BBC Thai reported that there had been protests associated with Free Youth in 49 provinces, while in 11 provinces saw activism associated with pro-establishment groups. In the same day, prominent Thammasat University student activist Parit “Penguin” Chiwarak was arrested on charges related to involvement in the 18 July "Free Youth" rally, leading to calls from Human Rights Watch that Thai authorities should immediately release him and drop all charges.

On 16 August, a large gathering which around 20,000–25,000 people joined was held at the Democracy Monument and reiterated calls for a revised constitution and reforms to the monarchy. Three students who had proposed the 10-point manifesto were denied access to the stage by the main body of protesters.

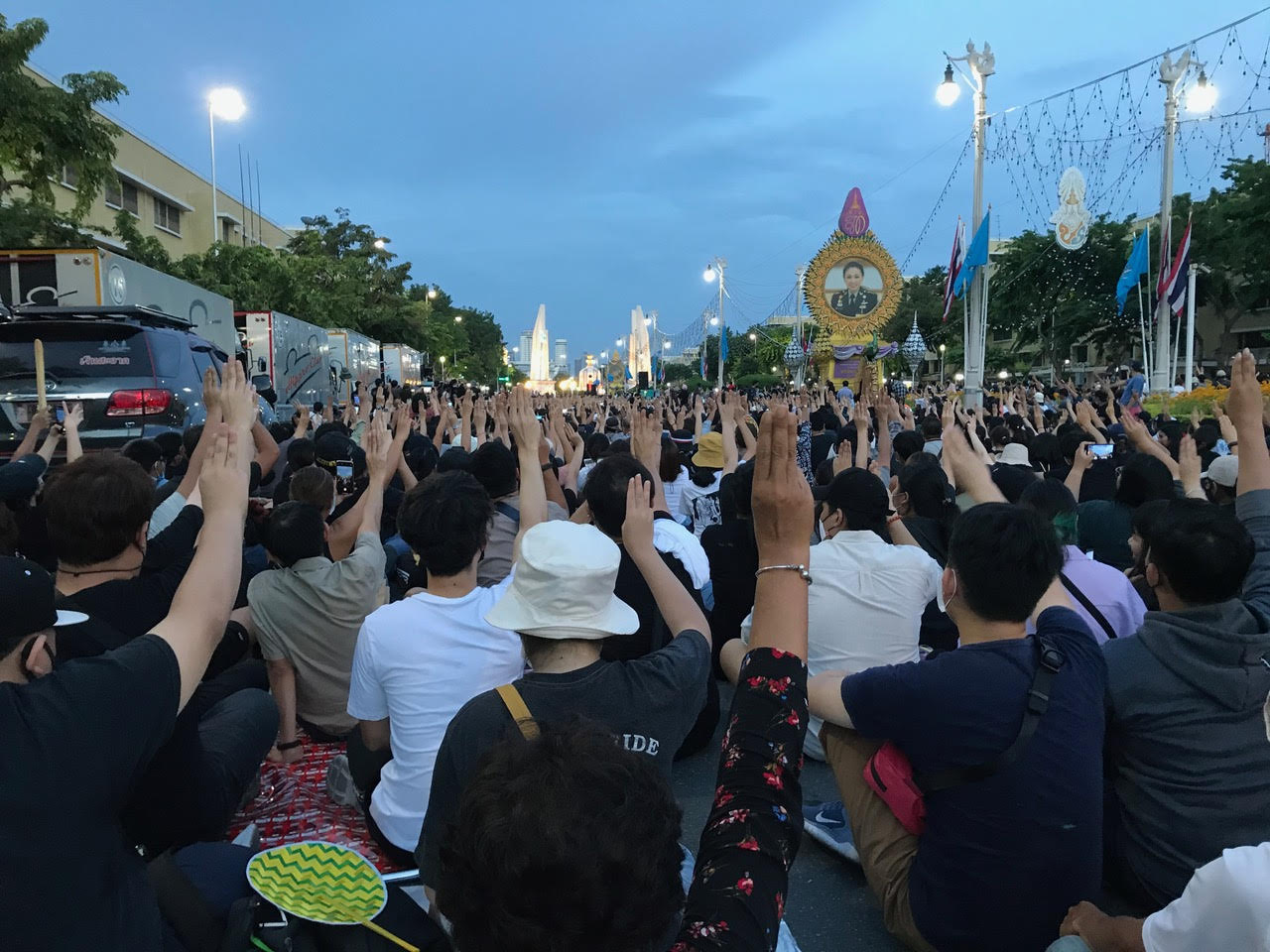
Protesters at Democracy Monument displaying three-finger gesture on 16 August demonstration.

On 18 August, approximately 400 members of Students held a rally at the Ministry of Education, calling for the resignation of the government. The group publicly scolded the Minister of Education, Nataphol Teepsuwan, a former PDRC core leader.

On 20 August, two large-scale student protests of approximately 1,000 people each were held in Khorat and Khon Kaen, with the "Khon Kaen’s Had Enough" group holding the protest in the city center and the Khorat group at the Thao Suranari Monument. Activists announced a "major rally" would occur on 19 September 2020, at Thammasat University’s Tha Prachan campus, to mark the 14th anniversary of the 2006 Thai military coup. On 24 August, Khon Kaen protest groups, including the Assembly of the Poor, appeared to endorse the 10 demands.

On 26 August, student groups presented submissions, including the 10 demands, to the House Committee on Political Development, Mass Communications and Public Participation. Two Free Youth group leaders were arrested the same day.

Subsequently, the opposition coalition submitted five constitutional amendment motions, including to amend Section 256 of the Constitution, the clause governing the constitution amendment procedure, while the government coalition submitted one motion. iLaw, a group of human rights lawyers, has sought via petition to present a five-point plan to set up a Constitution Drafting Committee to undo the political restrictions imposed by the NCPO-backed 2017 Constitution.

On 27 and 28 August, approximately 15,000 people gathered at 14 October Memorial for the first overnight protest, organized by the 'We are Friends' group. Five demands were read out in a Citizens’ Declaration, including the three original demands together with a call for resignation or removal of the senators by the end of September and reformation of the monarchy. On 28 August, as 15 anti-government activists from 18 July rally arrived to face charges at a Bangkok police station, their supporters removed barriers and forced entry to the police station.
