= 2020–2021 Thai protests =

Pro-democracy demonstrations

- Part of Gen Z protests in Asia
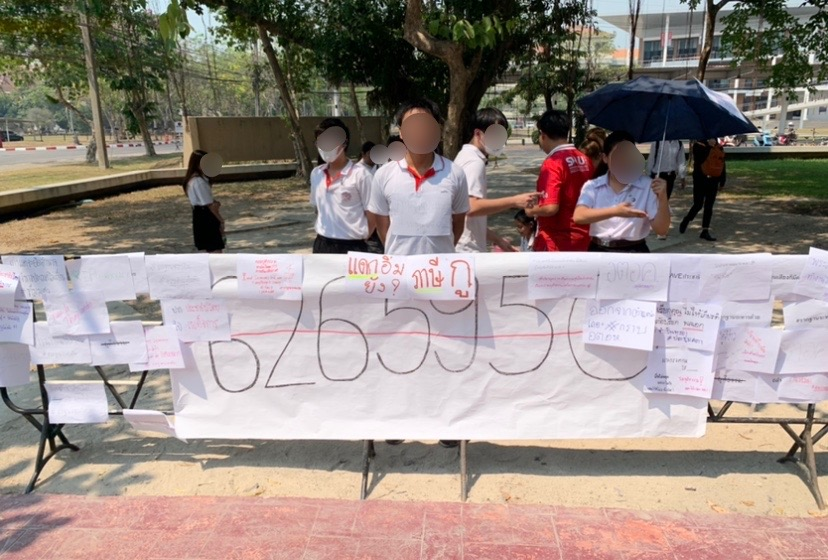
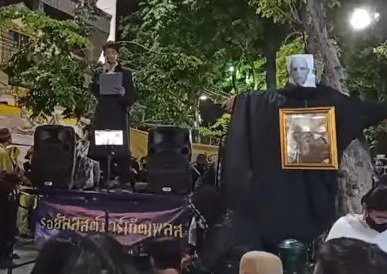
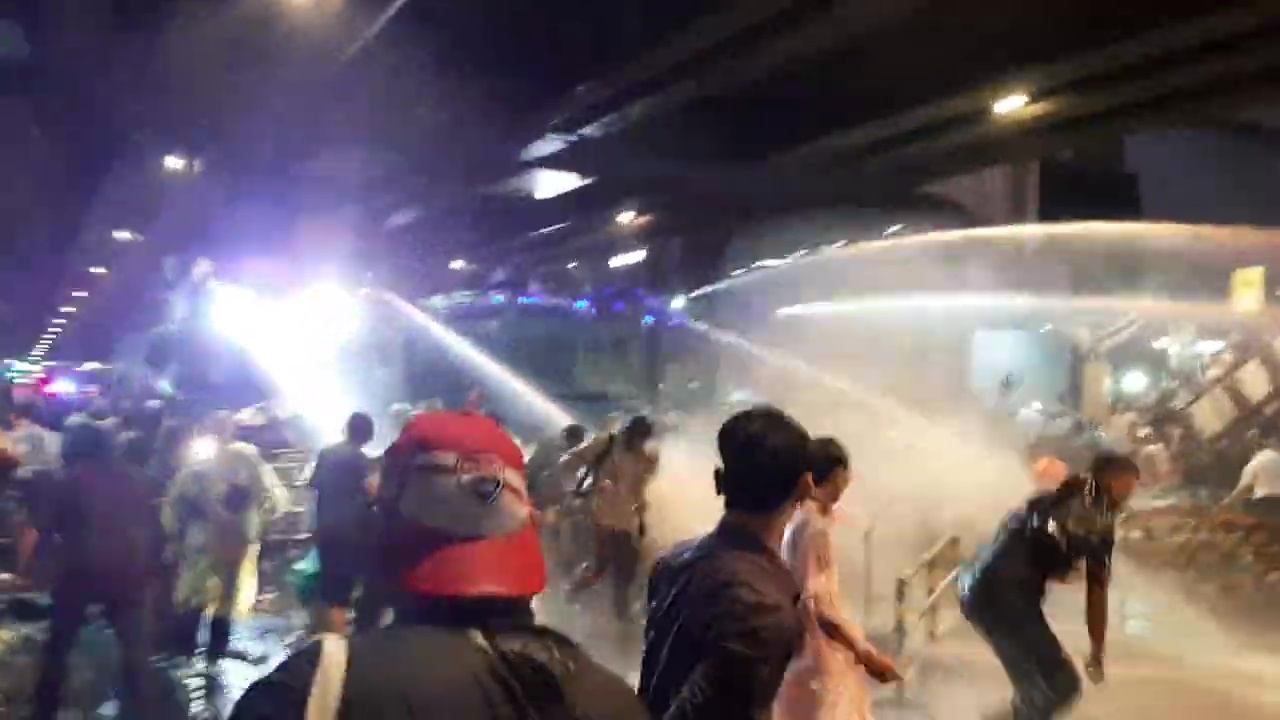
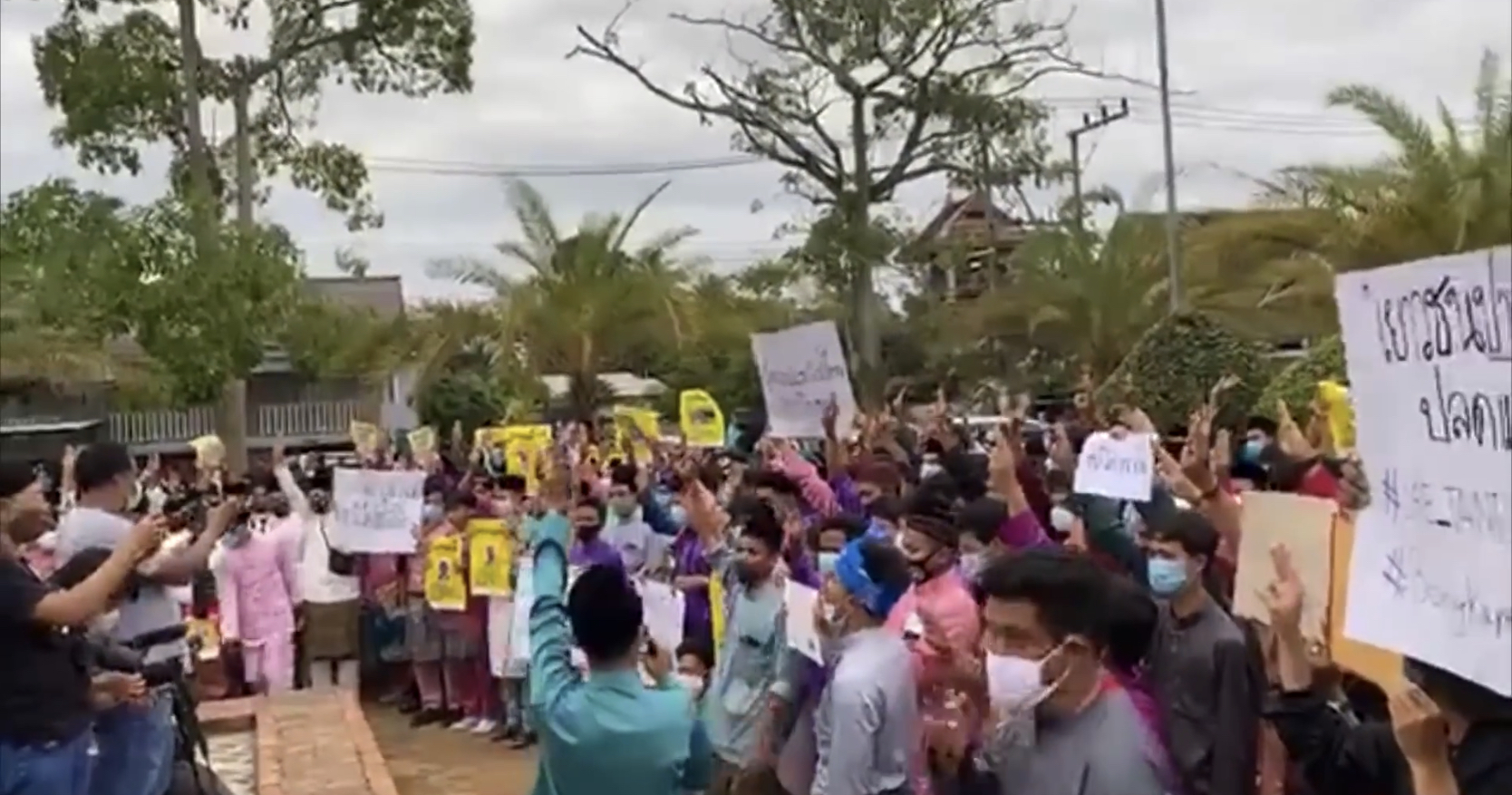
- Clockwise from top: Protesters at the Democracy Monument in Bangkok on 16 August; A student protester reading demands on monarchical reform on 3 August.; Demonstration in Pattani Province on 2 August.; Dispersal of protests at Patumwan Intersection on 16 October.; at Srinakharinwirot University Ongkharak Campus in Nakhon Nayok in February.
- Date: Phase 1: February 2020; Phase 2: July 2020 – December 2020; Phase 3: February 2021 – April 2021; Phase 4: May 2021 – December 2021; (Note: By 2022, street protests largely died down, which human rights groups have attributed to heavy suppression and surveillance by the Thai government, although activism has continued online due to being more difficult to prosecute.)
- Location: Thailand, including some overseas protests
- Caused by: Expansion of royal prerogative and lèse majesté; Democratic and economic regression since 2014 Thai coup d'état; Dissolution of the pro-democracy Future Forward Party; Distrust in the 2019 general election and the current political system, competitive authoritarianism and illiberal democracy; Forced disappearance and deaths of political activists, including Wanchalearm Satsaksit; Political corruption scandals, including Network monarchy and 1MDB; legal inequality and human rights abuses; Economic impact of COVID-19 pandemic and government response; LGBTQ discrimination; Dissatisfaction with education system
- Goals: Dissolution of the House and fresh legislative elections; Drafting a new constitution; Abolition of the military-appointed Senate; Restriction of royal prerogative and abolition of lèse majesté laws; Increasing civil, economic and political rights
- Methods: Demonstrations, (Note: Also characterised as "riots" by pro-government sources.) sit-ins, flash mob, online activism, petition, protest art, consumer activism, hunger strike, self-harm, initiative campaign
- Result: Protesters dispersed: "Severe" state of emergency declared in Bangkok from 15–22 October 2020; Protesters' demands, including calls for constitutional amendment, failed.; Constitutional Court rules that proposing reform of the monarchy is unconstitutional and amounts to acting to overthrow it; Suppression and surveillance of key protesters.

Parties
Protesters and organisations: (no centralised leadership): Khana Ratsadon 2563; Free People (from Free Youth); Democracy Restoration Group; Student Union of Thailand; Free Thoey; Campaigning Group for Constitution of the People; National Labour Assembly; Assembly of the Poor; Labour Network for People's Rights; Vocational College Protection of Democracy of Thailand; 'Bad Students' Group; Progressive Reds 63; REDEM	(Thailand) Thai Authorities: Government; Royal Thai Armed Forces; Internal Security Operations Command; Royal Thai Police; Senate; Pro-government citizens: including many unidentified groups who dressed in yellow. (Note: Yellow is the colour associated with Thai royalty.) See full list: Thai Citizens who Love and Revere the Monarchy Group; Vocational [students] Help the Nation (Note: Later found to be associated with a minor junior coalition partner Action Coalition for Thailand.); Rubbish Collection Organization; Coordination Center of Vocational Students for the Protection of National Institutions (CVPI); Loyal Thai (Thai Pakdee); Supported by: Monarchy; Constitutional Court; Bangkok Metropolitan Administration

Lead figures
Arnon Nampa; Panupong Jadnok Parit Chiwarak; Jatupat Boonpattararaksa Panusaya Sithijirawattanakul; Benja Apan; Patsaravalee Tanakitvibulpon	Prayut Chan-o-cha; Prawit Wongsuwan; Apirat Kongsompong (until 30 September 2020); Narongpan Jitkaewthae (from 1 October 2020); Chakthip Chaijinda (until 30 September 2020); Suwat Jangyodsuk (from 1 October 2020): Warong Dechgitvigrom

Number
18 July 2020: 2,500; 16 August 2020: 2,000–6,000; 19 September 2020: 5,000–6,000; October 2021: 3,000	

Casualties
- Deaths: 4 (1 policeman, (Note: Reportedly died from a heart attack during the 28 February event, not by injury.) 3 protesters)
- Injuries: 154+ (Note: Compiled from multiple sources:)
- Arrested: 581+ (Note: Compiled from multiple sources:)
- Charged: 1,634+

In Thailand, protests began in early 2020 with demonstrations against the government of Prime Minister Prayut Chan-o-cha. They later expanded to include the unprecedented demands for reform of the Thai monarchy. The protests were initially triggered by the dissolution of the Future Forward Party (FFP) in late February 2020 which was critical of Prayut, the changes to the Thai constitution in 2017, and the country's political landscape that it gave rise to.

This first wave of protests was held exclusively on academic campuses and was brought to a halt by the COVID-19 pandemic. Protests resumed on 18 July 2020 with a large demonstration organised under the Free Youth umbrella at the Democracy Monument in Bangkok. Three demands were presented to the Government of Thailand: the dissolution of parliament, ending intimidation of the people, and the drafting of a new constitution. The July protests were triggered by the impact of the COVID-19 pandemic and enforcement of the lockdown Emergency Decree and spread nationwide. The protesters were mostly students and young people without an overall leader.

On 3 August, two student groups publicly raised demands to reform the monarchy, breaking a long taboo of publicly criticising the monarchy. A week later, ten demands for monarchy reform were declared. A 19 September rally saw 5,000–10,000 protesters and has been described as an open challenge to King Vajiralongkorn. A government decision to delay voting on a constitutional amendment in late September fuelled nearly unprecedented public republican sentiment. (Note: For a comment on history of republicanism in Thailand, see: Jory, Patrick (31 December 2019). "Chapter Five. Republicanism in Thai History". In Peleggi, Maurizio (ed.). A Sarong for Clio. Cornell University Press. pp. 97–118. doi:10.7591/9781501725937-007. ISBN 978-1-5017-2593-7. S2CID 198887226. Archived from the original on 8 November 2020.) Following mass protests on 14 October, a "severe" state of emergency was declared in Bangkok during 15–22 October citing the alleged blocking of a royal motorcade. During this period saw the first crackdown by police on 16 October using water cannons.

In November, the Parliament voted to pass two constitutional amendment bills, but their content effectively shut down the protesters' demands of abolishing the Senate and reformation of the monarchy. Clashes between the protesters and the police and royalists became more prevalent, and resulted in many injuries. Protests in 2021 were more sporadic compared to the previous year, with prominent protesters facing charges and the police using harsher tactics. The first protester died in October 2021, with the video showing that he was shot with live rounds by a person inside a police station.

Government responses included filing criminal charges using the Emergency Decree; arbitrary detention and police intimidation; delaying tactics; the deployment of military information warfare units; media censorship; the mobilisation of pro-government and royalist groups who have accused the protesters of receiving support from foreign governments or non-governmental organizations (NGOs) as part of a conspiracy against Thailand; and the deployment of thousands of police at protests. The government ordered university chancellors to prevent students from demanding reforms to the monarchy and to identify student protest leaders. Protests since October, when the King had returned to the country from Germany, resulted in the deployment of the military, riot police, and mass arrests. In November 2021, the Constitutional Court ruled that demands for reform of the monarchy were unconstitutional and ordered an end to all movements. The ruling has been likened to judicial coup.

By the end of 2021, the leading figures Arnon Nampa, Panupong Jadnok, Parit Chiwarak, Jatupat Boonpattararaksa, Panusaya Sithijirawattanakul, and Benja Apan were all detained awaiting trial in series of detainments and releases, some were imprisoned accumulatively for more than 200 days since 2020, after Prayut declared the use of all laws, including lèse-majesté, against the protesters. By 2022, street protests largely died down due to government suppression and internal divisions, without any demands responded, although small-scale and online activism continued.

The protests were identified, as early as in 2020, as "Gen Z protests".

== Background ==
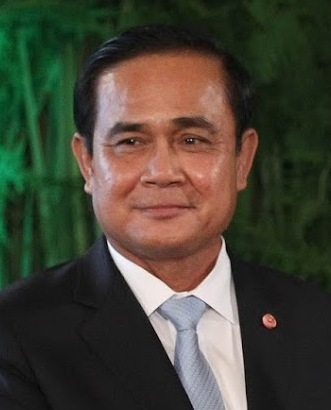
Resignation of Prayut Chan-o-cha, leader of the ruling government, was a main goal of the protests.

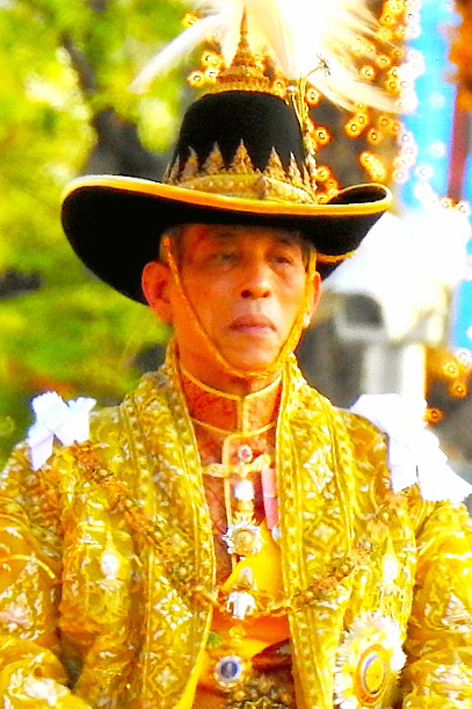
Vajiralongkorn (Rama X), King of Thailand; the reform of the monarchy was another goal of the protest.

=== Direct causes ===
Over the previous 90 years in Thailand, elected governments have frequently been overthrown by military coups. Thirteen successful coups have occurred since the end of absolute monarchy in the revolution of 1932. As head of the Royal Thai Army, Prayut Chan-o-cha instigated the most recent coup in 2014, and was leader of the National Council for Peace and Order (NCPO), the military junta which came to power following the coup. Prayut was eventually appointed prime minister and, together with the NCPO, ruled the country for five years, during which political and civil rights were restricted and economic inequality widened. A disputed referendum, widely called unfree and unfair, was held in 2016 to approve a new military-drafted constitution. Analysts have described the new constitution as favouring the military and disadvantaging large political parties. It includes a junta-appointed Senate, empowered to vote for the prime minister for five years, allowing the military to select two prime ministers in the future, and binds future governments to a 20-year national strategy 'road map' laid down the NCPO, effectively locking the country into the period of military-guided democracy with a much reduced role for politicians at both national and local levels.

Prayut's supporters make up a majority of parliament. The 2019 Thai general election, which was considered "partly free and not fair" and an example of electoral authoritarianism, was described as a 'political ritual' that nominally brought an end to the NCPO. The political system was continued with the formation of a new civil-military party, Palang Pracharat Party, which continued the NCPO's policies and orders in a form of competitive authoritarianism. The coalition government is composed of pro-Prayut camps and smaller parties who benefited from multiple technical interpretations of the election law by a military-controlled Election Commission, including a 44-day hiatus while the election laws were reinterpreted to pave way for a coalition with the state military party at the helm. Via NCPO mechanisms, Prayut has appointed allies to the Senate, Constitutional Court, various Constitutional organizations, including the Election Commission, and the National Anti-Corruption Commission as well as officials at the local government level. Substantively amending the Constitution is almost impossible as it would require both Senate support and a referendum. Numerous generals, as well as people with historical links to organized crime (e.g., Thammanat Prompao), hold key ministerial positions in Second Prayut Cabinet.

During the 2019 general election, the FFP was received well by progressives and youths, who viewed it as an alternative to traditional political parties and as against the NCPO, revealing a socio-political cleavage along generational lines, i.e., between Thai youth and the ruling Thai gerontocracy. The party won the third-largest share of parliamentary seats. After eleven months of the coalition, an opposition FFP became short-lived when it was dissolved by the Constitutional Court, as the House of Representatives about to debate on motion of no confidence. Former FFP members stressed the regime's corruption and were active in exposing the junta's involvement in the 1MDB scandal.

=== Underlying causes ===
Further sources of grievance, many of which the FFP championed, include abortion rights; authoritarianism in Thai schools (including hazing); education reform; labour rights (trade unionism); military reform (e.g., ending conscription and reducing the defense budget, including the purchase of submarines), monopolies (e.g., alcohol), and women's rights.

Criticism of the monarchy was quite rare during the 70-year reign of King Bhumibol Adulyadej, which ended in 2016. After the period of decreased status of the monarchy during Khana Ratsadon era, he restored influence and respect to the throne, which helped define the modern Thai political landscape. Since assuming the throne, King Vajiralongkorn has intervened publicly in Thai political affairs. The King voiced his opinion on the Constitution in 2017, leading to an amendment on the power of the monarchy in the version that had already been accepted in the 2016 constitutional referendum. He became one of the world's richest monarchs in 2018, when he was granted personal ownership of royal assets from the Crown Property Bureau (CPB), valued at approximately US$40 billion, which was formerly legally considered publicly owned. He has also consolidated the Privy Council, Office of the Royal Household and Royal Security Office into a single personal office; in 2020, the government transferred two army units to his personal command, giving military control to the monarchy which was unprecedented in modern Thailand. The Royal Office's budget for 2020 was US$290 million, more than double its budget from 2018.

On the eve of the 2019 election, Vajiralongkorn issued a royal announcement urging people to vote for "good people" (Thai: คนดี; RTGS: khon di; i.e., the junta parties), which was re-broadcast the following morning, in an "unprecedented intervention by the palace".^{:97} This sparked a massive, immediate, negative reaction on Twitter by Thai youth, using the hashtag "We are grown-ups and can choose for ourselves" (Thai: โตแล้วเลือกเองได้; RTGS: to laeo lueak eng dai). Following the election, on 19 July 2019, when the new cabinet was sworn in, they pledged their allegiance to the monarchy, but left out an oath to the constitution, and despite protests, did not correct what was widely seen as a serious breach of the traditional oath of office and a tacit admission of the increasingly absolutist nature of the Thai monarchy. Subsequently, in a ceremony on 27 August, each minister was presented with a framed message of support from the King. He has also been accused of rewriting history as monuments associated with Khana Ratsadon and the revolution of 1932 were demolished.

Vajiralongkorn resides most of the time in the state of Bavaria, Germany. At his request, the Thai constitution was amended to remove the requirement that a regent needed to be appointed. According to the German foreign ministry, the Thai ambassador has been told multiple times that Germany opposes "having guests in our country who run their state affairs from here."

The implementation of the Thai lèse majesté law has been controversial since Bhumibol's reign. The number of cases peaked to an unprecedented scale after 2014 coup. Critics viewed it as a political weapon to suppress dissent and restrict freedom of speech. Even though there have been no new cases since 2018, as Prayut said was the wish of King Vajiralongkorn, other security laws had been invoked in its place, such as the sedition law, the Computer Crime Act, or the offense of being a member of an organized crime group (อั้งยี่), all of which incur comparably severe punishment, and has been using this law as a political manipulation tool. In June 2020, the forced disappearance of Wanchalearm Satsaksit, assumed to be related to accusations of lèse majesté, gained online attention and sympathy. In July 2020, Tiwagorn Withiton, who wore a shirt with the slogan "I lost faith in the monarchy", was subjected to political psychiatry.

=== Concurrent developments ===
The government invoked the Emergency Decree on 26 March and issued a COVID-19 related curfew on 3 April in order to limit the spread of the virus. The government additionally issued a travel ban for all foreigners entering Thailand. International rights groups have criticized the emergency decree being employed to suppress free speech. Even though the country has a relatively successful response, as of July 2020, contributed by its robust public health infrastructure, the state of emergency and the severe economic restriction has not been cancelled. (Note: Thai authorities just allow incoming foreign tourists in October.) The country's significant tourism industry has been heavily affected, leaving Thailand with its worst economic downturn since the 1997 Asian financial crisis. The International Monetary Fund has predicted Thailand's GDP to shrink by 6.7 percent in 2020. The government borrowed and announced a 1.9 trillion-baht (US$60 billion) stimulus package, though few people have actually received it.

Shortly before the second wave protests, on 15 July, netizens were infuriated by privileged treatment to "VIP guests" who were later revealed to be positive for the coronavirus, as well as its failure to boost the heavily affected tourism industry. On the same day, Prayut Chan-o-cha made a visit to Rayong Province. Two protesters held signs calling for his resignation prior to the arrival; both were immediately arrested and reportedly beaten by the police, infuriating many Twitter users.

Other related developments include the suicide of senior judge Khanakorn Pianchana over his frustration due to pressure on his verdicts in favour of military officers, surgical mask profiteering by Thammanat Prompao, delayed COVID-19 welfare money transfers, the government's approval of the Civil Partnership bill (which does not recognize equal status of same-sex couples), and the case against Red Bull heir Vorayuth Yoovidhya.

== First wave (February 2020) ==
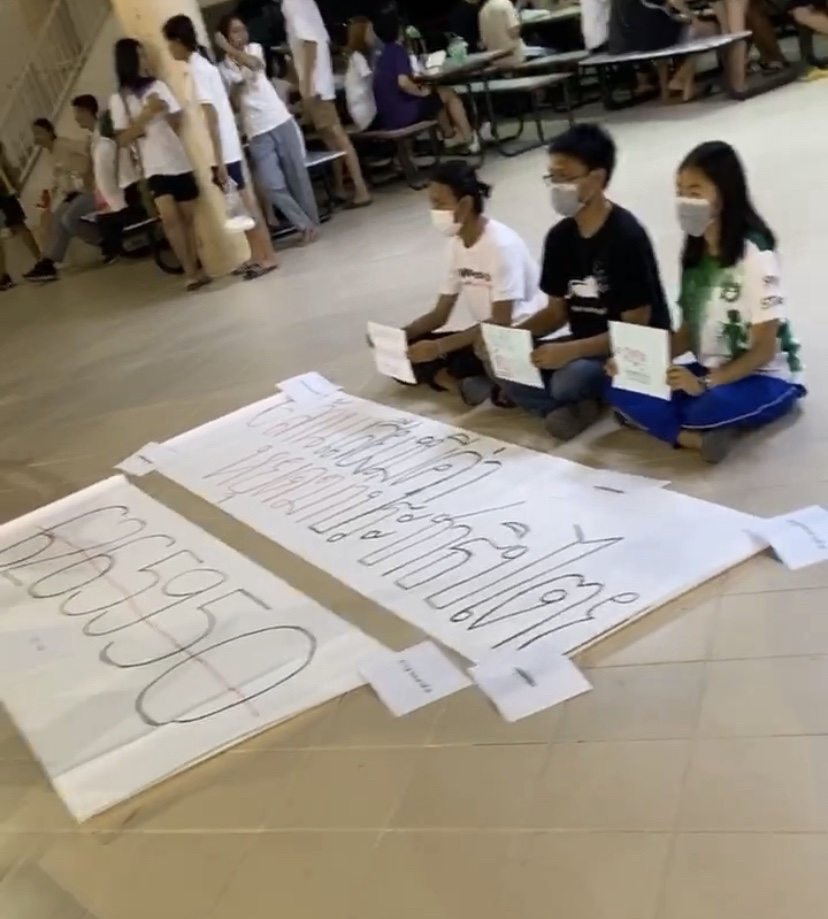
Protests at Srinakharinwirot University Ongkharak Campus on 25 February. The crossed out number is the popular vote count of dissolved FFP

The first wave protests were triggered by the Constitution Court decision to disband the FFP on 23 February 2020. Demonstrations since erupted in various high schools, colleges, and universities nationwide. These student-organised protests also came with various hashtags unique to their institutions. The firsts began at Thammasat University, Chulalongkorn University, Ramkhamhaeng University, Kasetsart University, Srinakharinwirot University and Prince of Songkhla University on 24 February. Various high school students also organised protests at Triam Udom Suksa School and Suksanari School.

The protests, however, were limited to individual institutions. A Thai historian scholar noted that street protests have never created political changes if the military sided with the government. The protests, which were organized exclusively on the academia grounds, were halted in late February due to the COVID-19 pandemic, with all universities, colleges, and schools shut down.

=== Hashtags ===
The use of online media, such as TikTok and Twitter, including various hashtags, has characterized the protests. Hashtags have emerged for protests at each institution. For example:

- Protests at Chulalongkorn University used #เสาหลักจะไม่หักอีกต่อไป (lit. The pillar will no longer be broken; an analogy to the university's tagline as "the pillar of the land.")
- Protests at Triam Udom Suksa School used #เกียมอุดมไม่ก้มหัวให้เผด็จการ (lit. Giam Udom doesn't bow to dictatorship; the name "Giam Udom" is an alias of "Triam Udom")
- Protests at Srinakharinwirot University (SWU) used #มศว คนรุ่นเปลี่ยน (lit. SWU generation of change)

Some have mentioned their distaste of the pro-military and pro-monarchy conservatives (dubbed Salim — สลิ่ม; the word was derived from Thai dessert sarim) such as

- Protests at Kasetsart University (KU) used #KUไม่ใช่ขนมหวานราดกะทิ (KU is not coconut milk dessert [referring to sarim.])
- Protests at Khon Kaen University (KKU) used #KKUขอโทษที่ช้าโดนสลิ่มลบโพสต์ (KKU is sorry for being late; [our] posts were deleted by salims)
- Protests at Mahidol University (located in Salaya) used #ศาลายางดกินของหวานหลายสี (Salaya stops eating multi-coloured dessert [referring to sarim.])
- Protests at King Mongkut's Institute of Technology Ladkrabang (Phra Chom Klao) used #พระจอมเกล้าชอบกินเหล้าไม่ชอบกินสลิ่ม (Phra chom klao loves eating [drinking] liquors but not salim)

== Second wave (July 2020 – December 2020) ==
=== Protests under Three Demands ===
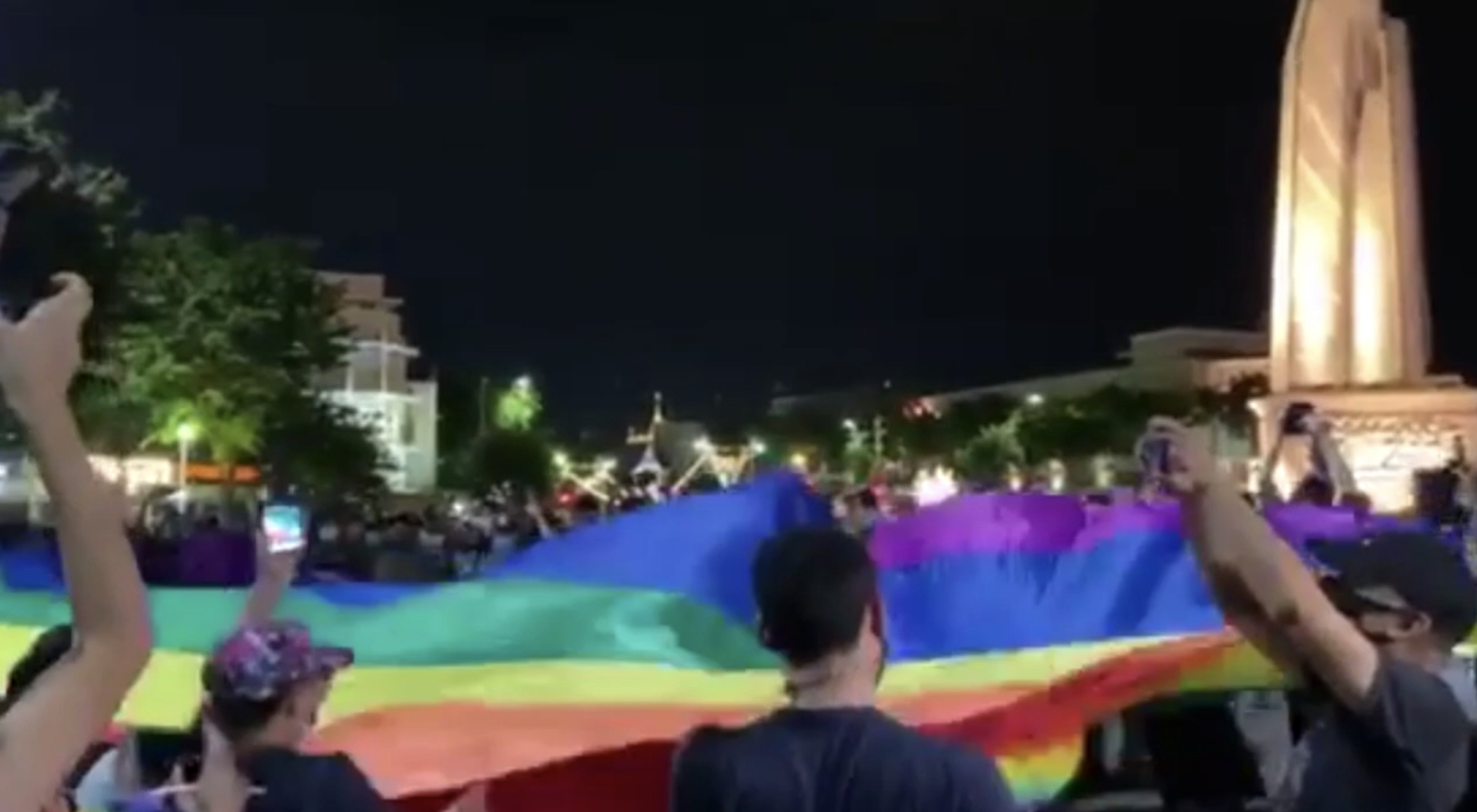
Seri Thoey group flew the LGBT flag during the protest on 25 July

On 18 July, Thailand saw the largest street demonstration since the 2014 Thai coup d'état at the Democracy Monument in Bangkok with around 2,500 protesters. The protesters, organised under the name Free Youth (Thai: เยาวชนปลดแอก; RTGS: yaowachon plot aek), announced their three core demands: dissolution of the House, ending intimidation of the people and drafting a new constitution. A Free Youth leader stated that they do not aim to overthrow the monarchy. The gathering was planned to last overnight, but it was cancelled by midnight for security reasons.

After 18 July, the protests began to spread across the country. The first were in Chiang Mai Province and Ubon Ratchathani Province on 19 July. By 23 July, demonstrations had been organised in more than 20 provinces. Some major demonstrations include one in Maha Sarakham Province on 23 July, of which its hashtag #IsanSibothon quickly trended first on Twitter in Thailand, and one in Nakhon Ratchasima Province on 24 July saw one of the largest crowds amongst them.

On 25 July, an LGBT activist group Seri Thoey (lit. Free Thoey; parody to the Seri Thai – Free Thai Movement), demonstrated at the Democracy Monument calling for legalisation of same-sex marriage in addition to the three demands.

On 26 July, an event called "Let's run, Hamtaro" was organised at the Democracy Monument. Having begun in a protest at Triam Udom Suksa School in Bangkok, but later spread on Twitter, and eventually gathered around 3,000 people.

=== Further demands of monarchy reform and subsequent protests ===
Summary of Demands on Reform of the Monarchy

1. Revoke the King's immunity against lawsuits.
2. Revoke lèse majesté law, give amnesty to every persecuted individual.
3. Separate the King's personal and royal assets.
4. Reduce the budget allocated to the monarchy.
5. Abolish the Royal Offices and unnecessary units e.g. Privy Council.
6. Open assets of the monarchy to audit.
7. Cease the King's power to give public political comments.
8. Cease propaganda around the King.
9. Investigate the murders of commentators or critics of the monarchy.
10. Forbid the King to endorse future coups.

On 3 August, a Harry Potter-themed demonstration was held, which 200 people joined, featured a public speech by Arnon Nampa which openly criticised the monarchy, and demanded amendment of increasing royal prerogative and reform of the lèse majesté law. Paul Chambers, a Southeast Asian politics scholar, noted that "Such open criticism of Thailand's monarch by non-elites at a public place within Thailand with the police simply standing by is the first of its kind in Thai history." The police arrested Arnon and another Free Youth leader on 8 August.

On 10 August, there was a rally at Thammasat University, Rangsit campus in Pathum Thani Province named "ธรรมศาสตร์จะไม่ทน." (lit. Thammasat will not tolerate.) by United Front of Thammasat and Demonstration group. Totaling about 3,000 people, it employed the slogan "We don't want reforms; we want revolution." Among the events were the declaration of ten demands to reform the monarchy by Rung Panusaya, and the monarchy reform speeches by Panupong Jadnok and Arnon Nampa. According to AP, the protesters at the site had mixed reaction to the demands. BBC analyst called it the revolutionary speech for Thailand history.

On 14 August, BBC Thai reported that there had been protests associated with Free Youth in 49 provinces, while in 11 provinces saw activism associated with pro-establishment groups. In the same day, student activist Parit "Penguin" Chiwarak was arrested, leading to calls from Human Rights Watch to immediately release him and drop all charges against all activists.

On 16 August, a large gathering which around 20,000–25,000 people joined was held at the Democracy Monument and reiterated calls for a revised constitution and reforms to the monarchy.

On 20 August, two large-scale student protests of approximately 1,000 people each were held in Nakhon Ratchasima and Khon Kaen. Activists announced a "major rally" planned on 19 September 2020, at Thammasat University's Tha Prachan campus.

=== Formal submission of demands and responses ===
On 26 August, student groups presented submissions, including the 10 demands, to the House of Representatives. Subsequently, the opposition and the coalition submitted constitutional amendment motions, including to amend the clause governing the constitution amendment procedure.

On 27–28 August, approximately 15,000 people gathered at 14 October Memorial for the first overnight protest, organized by the 'We are Friends' group. On 28 August, as 15 anti-government activists from the 18 July rally arrived to face charges.

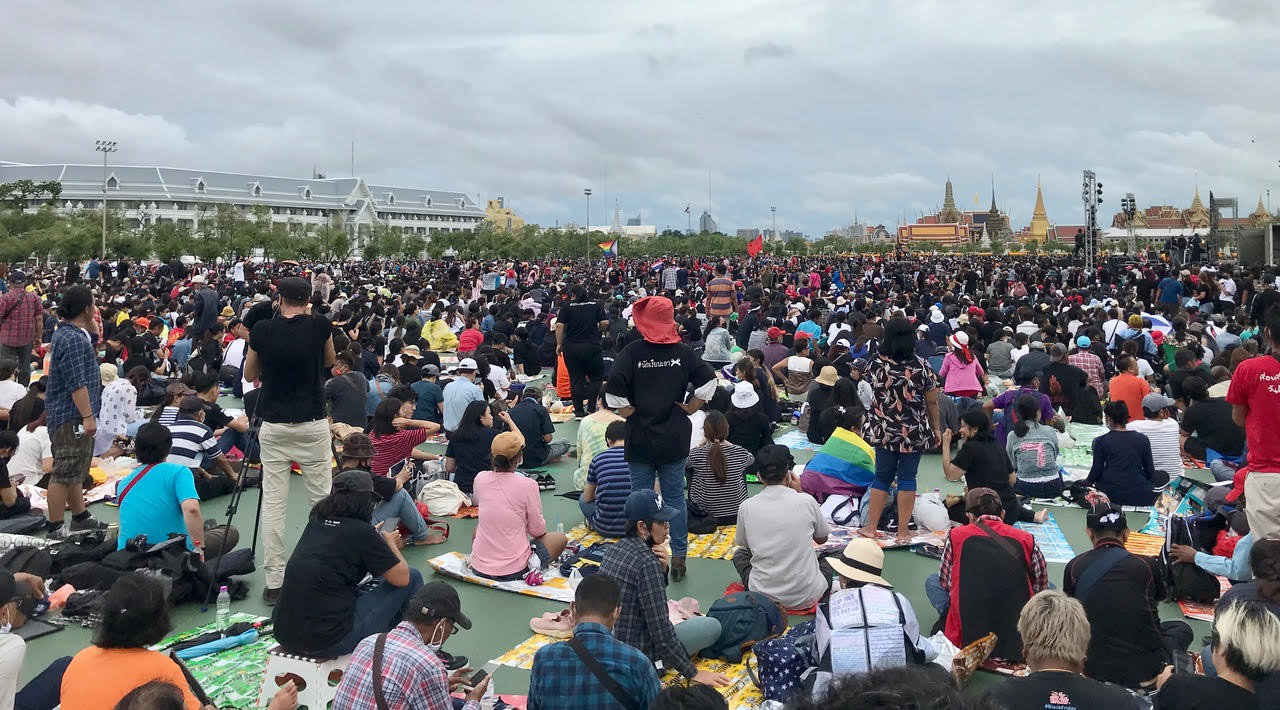
The occupation of Sanam Luang by demonstrators on 19 September 2020.

In a rally described as one of the largest protests in years, on 19 September, protesters gathered at Thammasat University, then moved to Sanam Luang in the afternoon and stayed overnight there, with attendance estimated at anywhere between 20,000 and 100,000, On 20 September, the protesters installed a plaque symbolizing the now-missing Khana Ratsadon plaque at Sanam Luang. The protesters submitted their demands to the president of the Privy Council via the chief of the Metropolitan Police Bureau before dispersing. There were no reports of violence; protest leader Parit Chiwarak called for a general strike on 14 October to commemorate the 1973 Thai popular uprising. The plaque was removed less than 24 hours after it was installed; however, it has since proliferated as an online meme. Some international media described the rally as an open challenge to Vajiralongkorn.

On 24 September, Parliament voted to set up a study committee, effectively delaying a scheduled vote on constitutional amendment by at least a month. Discontent prompted #RepublicofThailand to trend first in the country's Twitter, with more than 700,000 retweets, the first mass public expression of republican sentiment in the country.

=== Strengthened emergency powers ===
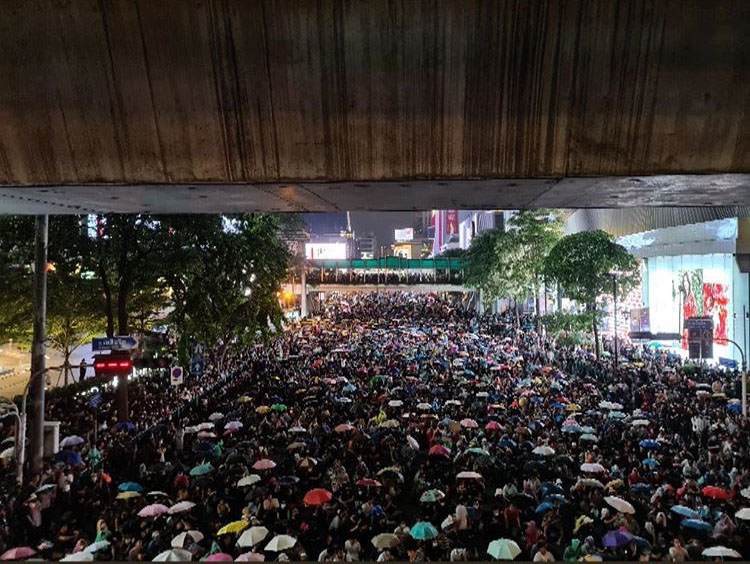
The 15 October protest at the Ratchaprasong intersection.

After no major events for nearly a month, on 13 October, a small group of protesters gathered at Ratchadamnoen Avenue, to protest the passing of the king's motorcade, resulting in the detention of activists. The planned protest rally on 14 October began at Democracy Monument, with the objective of moving to Government House to demand the resignation of Prayut. They were met by "counter-protesters," who were trucked in using municipal vehicles, as well as right-wing groups, including the Thai Pakdee (Loyal Thais) and the Rubbish Collection Organization, who held their rallies. Later in the day, tens of thousands of protesters, some under the umbrella of "Khana Ratsadorn 2563", were largely peaceful, marked by some violent assaults on the protesters by pro-royalists, marched to Government House and set up camps around it. The protest coincided with a planned royal progression around the city. The royal motorcade passed a protester crowd, strayed from the announced route. Later that evening, Prayut ordered legal actions against the protesters for allegedly blocking the motorcade, but, according to Reuters, "none appeared to be trying to reach it". Arnon accused the authorities of intentionally arranging the motorcade through the rally site. He gave an estimate of 200,000 participants before midnight.

On 15 October, the authorities declared a "severe" state of emergency in Bangkok from 04:00 local time and banned gatherings of five or more people. The protesters were cleared using riot police. In the process, police detained three protest leaders, and imposed a ban on sensitive media stories. During the day, troops were dispatched to guard the Government House and Parliament, raising alarm from an opposition member of parliament (MP) of resembling pre-2014 coup days. A smaller planned occupation of at least 13,500 participants went ahead at the Ratchaprasong intersection, (Note: Ratchaprasong was the site of the military crackdown in May 2010.) and more protesters were arrested. A legal aid group reported at least 51 people were arrested between 13 and 15 October.

Police using water cannons to disperse protesters at Pathum Wan Intersection on 16 October.

On 16 October, around 2,000 unarmed protesters, mostly teenagers, gathered at Pathum Wan Intersection, and two hours later were dispersed by the police. High-pressure water cannons with chemical-filled water and tear gas were used. The commander of the Metropolitan Police reported at least 100 people were arrested. Protesters vowed to continue. The police defended their use of the chemicals and that they were following "international standards."

External videos
- Assault of student protesters at Ramkhamhaeng University 21 October 2020, Twitter video

Protests then organized more online and held flash protests at numerous locations. There were protests almost daily from 17 to 24 October, even though they were faced with government-ordered shutdown of the capital's rapid transit systems. In a televised speech on 21 October, Prayut suggested that both sides reconcile their differences through the parliamentary process. On the same day, a group of royalist counter-protesters wearing yellow shirts assaulted the protesters at Ramkhamhaeng University, resulting in one injured student. The following day, Prayut revoked the severe emergency declaration, on the grounds that the severity of the situation had lessened.

Prayut scheduled an emergency parliamentary session for 26–27 October. Protesters, however, preferred that the government show good faith and resign before advocating for amendments. The non-voting sessions addressed none of the protesters' concerns. As a result, Prayut said that the government would present a Constitutional amendment bill and a reconciliation committee to resolve the political conflict would be set up.

=== Further anti-royal protests ===
On 26 October, protesters marched to the German Embassy in Bangkok, petitioning the German government to investigate the King's activities in Germany, if he had exercising powers from German soil. And on 3 November, a demonstration was held to protest a block of the Pornhub website, a move suspected to restrict access to some compromising material of the king. Meanwhile, on 1 November, a group of yellow-shirted royalists demonstrated their support for the King at the Grand Palace.

On 8 November, an estimated 7,000–10,000 protesters marched from Democracy Monument to the Grand Palace to deliver their letters to the King. The protesters insisted that their demand to reform the monarchy is already the best compromise they could offer. The gathering was largely peaceful, but the 9,000 men strong police employed water cannons for the second time. Though brief, the incident caused five injuries, including one police officer, according to the capital's emergency medical center.

On 14 November, around 20 protesting groups ranging from high school, women rights to LGBTQ activists in an event called "Mob Fest". One event resulted in a covering of Democracy Monument with cloth, and a small clash with the police.

On 17 November, the Senate and House of Representatives began a two-day joint session to consider changes to the constitution. That day, at least 55 people were hurt when protesters near Parliament clashed with the police and yellow-shirted royalists. Police fired tear gas and water cannons at the crowd. Six people suffered gunshot wounds. On the second day, lawmakers rejected five of the seven proposals to amend the constitution, including the submission by Internet Law Reform Dialogue, or iLaw, which was most preferred by the protesters.

On 18 November, angered by the rejection of the people-proposed constitutional bill and the use of force the day before, thousands of protesters gathered at the Royal Thai Police's headquarters and hurled paint and sprayed graffiti in the area. On 19 November, police officers and pro-government volunteers rushed to clean it, which earned a thanks from Prayut. On 21 November, high school students led thousands of protesters in Bangkok. In addition to the common protest themes of government and monarchy reform, high school students are seeking more freedom and fairness in an education system.

External videos
- Clip of unknown person throwing explosive at rally 25 November 2020, Twitter video

On 25 November, over 10,000 protesters converged on the headquarters of Siam Commercial Bank (SCB) in northern Bangkok, in which the King is the largest shareholder, to demand an investigation into the king's wealth and spending. The police had heavily barricaded the area with shipping containers, concrete barricades and razor wire. The day before, Thai authorities ordered 12 protest leaders to turn themselves in on 1 December and face charges that include lèse-majesté. A well-known Thai royalist scholar Sulak Sivaraksa decried Prayut's using the lèse-majesté law and called for the prime minister's removal from office. At least two protesters were wounded in an explosion and shooting incident late into the night, four or five shots being fired. The police put the blame on rivalry in the vocational students group themselves.

On 27 November, about 5,000 protesters joined an anti-coup drill in northern Bangkok's Lat Phrao Intersection. Protest leader Panupong "Mike Rayong" Jadnok urged people to park vehicles at key Bangkok intersections in the event of a coup, to obstruct military movement.

On 29 November, thousands of protesters marched to a barracks, demanding the King to give up control of some army regiments. At the 11th Infantry Regiment, one of two army units that the king brought under his direct command in 2019, protesters splashed red paint on the ground, referencing the deadly army crackdown on anti-government redshirt demonstrators in 2010. They were blocked at the gate by riot police in gas masks and helmets.

On 2 December, the Constitutional Court ruled in favor of Prayut in a conflict-of-interest case over his use of military housing. The former army chief had been living in a military residence after retiring from the army in 2014, months after he led the coup over the elected government. The ruling allowed Pruyut to remain in power. Thousands of protested gathered at the Lat Phrao Intersection to protest the verdict.

On 7 December, Free Youth began a Restart Thailand campaign emphasizing the importance of farmers and laborers. Their use of a hammer and sickle banner drew criticism for its links to communism. Many student leaders distanced themselves from the group, concerned that new protesters would be discouraged.

On 10 December, democracy activists rallied at the UN's Bangkok office, held up a banner saying "Repeal Lèse-Majesté Law." Representatives were admitted to the building to hand over a letter, requesting the UN to pressure the Thai government into repealing Lèse-majesté laws they say are being used to suppress their movement. Hundreds of protesters also rallied at the 14 October 1973 Memorial that commemorates the lives of pro-democracy supporters lost during a military massacre in 1973, they raised the three-finger salute and shouted "Abolish 112," referring to the criminal code of lèse-majesté law. Ahead of the rally, protest leaders held a news conference at the 14 October 1973 Memorial. "We join together to demand the abolishment of this legal provision," a protest leader said, reading out a prepared statement regarding lèse-majesté in English.

After five months of street protest, the movement quieted in late December before New Year, which also coincided with a COVID-19 outbreak in the country. Protest leaders said they were taking a "break".

== Third wave (February 2021 – April 2021) ==
Protestors took a break in December 2020 and January 2021 as Thailand was hit by a second wave of COVID-19 infections during the pandemic. During the break from street protests, the movement continued to voice their opinions online, while prominent members faced legal battles. Between November and December 2020, 38 individuals were charged with lese-majeste. A student was arrested at his dormitory at 3.00 a.m. on 14 January 2021, leading to a flash protest at the local police station.

On 16 January 2021, five protesters at a flash protest targeted at lese-majeste law were arrested by anti-riot police, marking the first street protest in 2021. A small explosion from a ping-pong bomb was heard which was apparently thrown at the approaching police, raising concerns of increasing violence. A member of a protest security group was kidnapped on the same day and was later found on 17 January, which state security personnel were thought to be the perpetuator.

On 19 January 2021, Benja Apan from Thammasat group went to Iconsiam shopping mall owned by Sirindhorn and Charoen Pokphand group to protest holding signs saying "Monopolizing the vaccine to give the spotlight to the monarchy", directly linked to Vajiralongkorn's Siam Bioscience drug company. She was harassed and assaulted by Iconsiam guard.

External videos
- Police brutality on man dressed as medic 13 Feb 2021, Twitter video
- Police chasing fleeing protesters 20 Mar 2021, Twitter video

On 1 February, in response to 2021 Myanmar coup d'état, Thai and Myanmar protesters organised an event at the Myanmar embassy in Bangkok, resulting in three arrests. On 10 February, the protesters held the first street rally in months, to protest the detention of four prominent members who were charged with lese majeste, among others. In the evening, explosive sound was heard, and an empty tear gas canister was found. The police, without any investigation, readily told reporters that the canister was stolen from prior rallies. Ten activists were briefly detained for hanging protest banners.

On 13 February, the protesters held a peaceful demonstration at Democracy Monument and the City Pillar Shrine. However, clashes between them and the police happened in the evening, with video of riot police stomping a men dressed in a medic uniform. Eleven more activists were detained, and #ตำรวจกระทืบหมอ ("police stomped doctor") trended the country's Twitter.

On 28 February, as the movement was trying to rebuild momentum since the break and jailing of some core protesters, the Restart Democracy group (rebranded from Free Youth group) held an event at 1st Infantry Regiment, where Prayut's residence and the headquarter of King's Close Bodyguard are located. The skirmishes between both sides began in the evening, shortly before a decision to disperse. Some hardline protesters held their ground, while throwing objects at the police. The police retaliated by firing water cannons, tear gas, and rubber bullets at them. According to Bangkok's emergency medical service, 10 protesters and 22 police officers were injured. The leaderless tactics employed there were criticized by fellow protest organizers, who pointed out the communication problems and inability to deescalate. During the event, out of uniform security personnel were seen near the protest venue, the second time since the 13 February event.

On 17 March, Thai Parliament voted down two constitutional amendment bills, after the Constitutional Court ruled that the amendment must pass a referendum first.

On 20 March, a protester group called REDEM, amounting about 1,000, gathered at Sanam Luang, in front of the Grand Palace in Bangkok. The venue was heavily barricaded with shipping containers. The skirmish broke out when some protesters tried to remove the barricade, but they were met with police water cannons, tear gas and rubber bullets. Some protesters used molotov cocktails and burned tires. One journalist opined that the government response was intensified compared to last year. 33 people, including 12 police officers, were reported injured, and 32 people were arrested.

On 29 April, Benja Apan, Nutchanon Pairoj, and a group of other students came to the Criminal Court to send an open letter demanding the release of imprisoned activists. They called Chanathip Muanpawong, the judge who denied bail, to come to receive the letter. Benja scattered paper printed with the names of 11,035 supporters on the stairs to the court building, and said that the students are not a threat to national security but wanting to improve Thai society and for the monarchy to exist under the law.

== Fourth wave (May 2021 – November 2021) ==
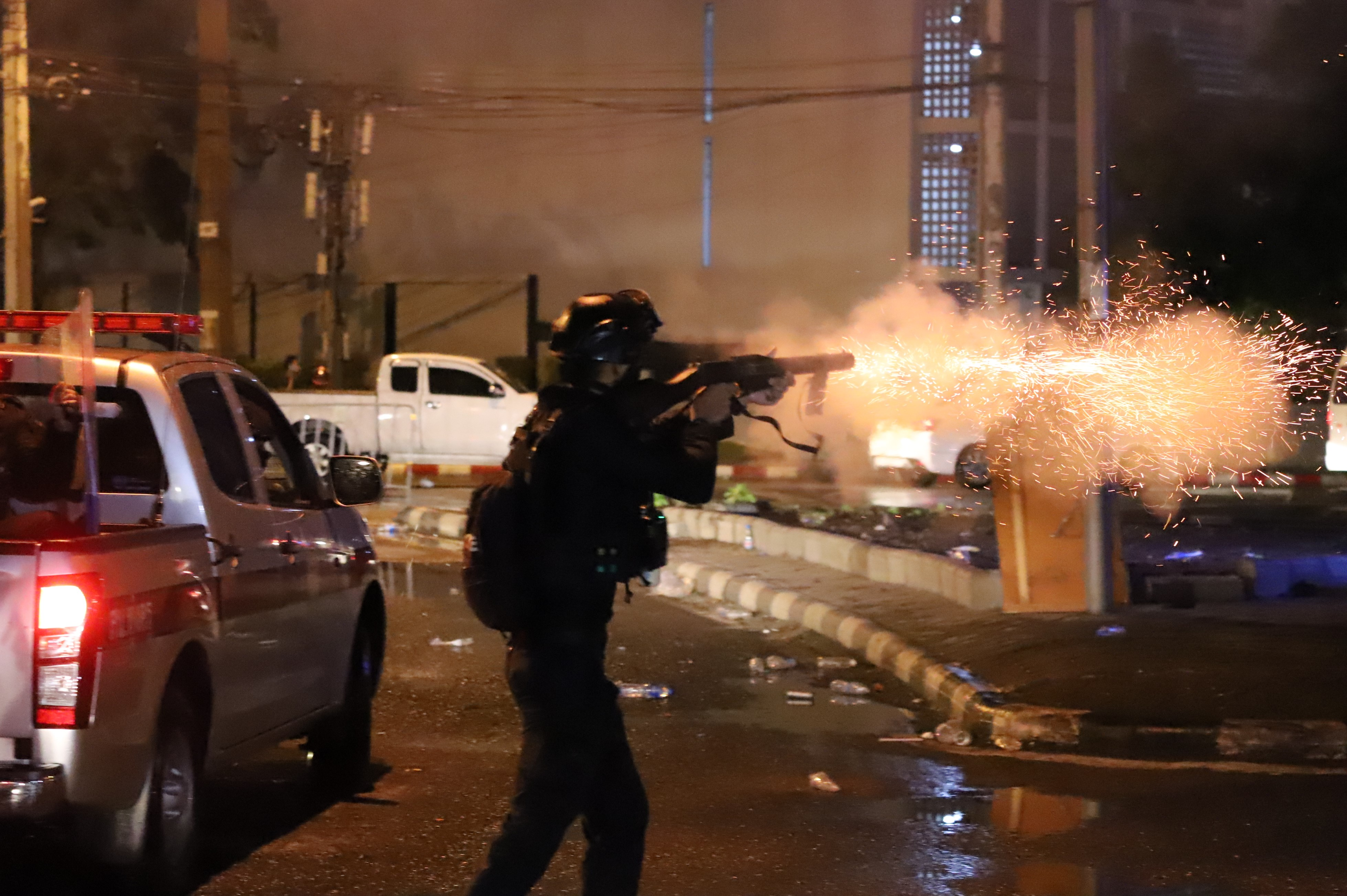
Riot Police fire tear gas to anti-government protesters during Din Daeng Protests in August 2021

External image
- Police pointing firearm at unarmed civilian 1 Aug 2021, Facebook

Although the new NGO laws had been implemented and the pandemic was still serious, starting from mid-June, a new wave of protest started. Further protests were arranged in July, with police employing tear gas and rubber bullets against some of the protests.

Rallies occurred in more than 30 provinces on 1 August.

On 3 August, Arnon Nampa gave a critical speech once again on the front of Bangkok Art and Culture Centre to commemorate 'Harry Potter themed' last year. This time he demanded the revocation of Article 112 and transferring of public assets from the King back to the previous status. He has been in jail since 9 August until today on lese majeste charges.

On 7 August, the Free Youth group planned a march to the Grand Palace from the Democracy Monument asking for reform and a good vaccine program, but Thai riot police pressured them out before the event starts. They headed back to the parliament. But later, they went further to the Victory Monument, preparing to go to Prayut Chan-o-cha house. Thai riot police closed the Din Daeng area to prevent protesters from going near Prayuth's house. The police fired a lot of tear gas at them. It was the beginning of Din Daeng's later series of protests. Around 6pm, the police truck was burned near the Victory Monument. Din Daeng's non-organized protest, called 'Talugaz', started on this day.

On 10 August, UFTD 'Car Mob' led by Benja Apan protest which started at Ratchaprasong intersection. She stated in front of the Sino-Thai office, a construction company owned by Deputy Prime Minister Anutin Charnvirakul, that the 2014 coup by Prime Minister Prayut Chan-o-cha benefited only the elite. She criticized the government's mishandling of the COVID-19 pandemic, reboot the economy, repeals the junta constitution, reforms in state structures, and the monarchy.

On 16 August, in series of street fight around Din Deang area, Warit Somnoi, a teenager, was shot in the head in front of the Din Daeng police station. The bullet came from the police station. He was hospitalized in coma.

On 7 October, a policeman was shot in the head in the Din Daeng area. The police raided the flats, held 13 people for questioning (7 of them younger than 13 years of age) and reported that it had seized many weapons.

On 28 October, after 2-month coma, Warit Somnoi died. On the next day, pro-democracy supporters gathered at the Din Daeng police station to hold a candlelit vigil. The police pushed them back and arrested 2 people.

On 31 October, Panusaya called for the lese majeste law to be repealed in Ratchaprasong area. There were more than 3,000 people gathering. Panusaya cut her left arm open with the message '112' in the end of her speech.

By 2022, street protests largely died down, which human rights groups have attributed to heavy suppression and surveillance by the Thai government, although activism has continued online due to being more difficult to prosecute.

== Financing ==
The protests are financed by private donations, mainly from actress Intira Charoenpura and the K-pop fandom in Thailand — the latter alone donated over ฿3,600,000 (around US$115,399) on 18 October 2020. There have been attempts to prosecute the donors. A conspiracy theory accusing foreigners, including the United States government and American organisations such as Human Rights Watch and Netflix, of funding the protests has been voiced by the royalist group Thailand Vision and campaigners at pro-government rallies leading the U.S. embassy in Bangkok to issue a formal statement of denial. Pro-monarchy demonstrators gathered at the embassy on 27 October, demanding that the United States end the "hybrid war" against Thailand.

== Reactions ==
=== State response and arrests ===
External videos
- Arrest of student leader Parit Chiwarak on 14 August 2020 (3:09, in Thai), YouTube video.
- Arrest of student leader Pai Daodin on 13 October 2020 (0:39), Youtube video.

An Isaan Record analysis found that the government response has included force and intimidation, arbitrary detention, arrests and changes, disinformation, the deployment of military Information and Operations units, media censorship, delaying tactics, obfuscation, support for pro-government groups, gaslighting, and negotiation, as well as mobile jamming devices. The Government Public Relations Department of Thailand released two propaganda YouTube videos attacking the protesters.

Prayut blamed the protesters for further damaging the country's economy. Key military personnel, such as General Apirat Kongsompong, the Commander-in-Chief of the Royal Thai Army, condemned the protesters, even accusing them of lése majesté, while the new Army commander Narongpan Jittkaewtae told the protesters to "reform yourselves first." Public Health Minister Anutin Charnvirakul, a notable politician from a junior coalition partner, expressed concern about implications for COVID-19 spread whilst signaling his own neutrality. However, the country's coronavirus caseloads remained low amidst the growing protests.

The authorities have intimidated protesters via the state academic system. The Thai authorities, referencing the Thammasat University Massacre and 1992 protests, ordered universities to prevent students from demanding monarchy reform and to compile lists of protest leaders. Some universities and schools responded by forbidding their staff and students to join the protests and by banning gatherings on their grounds, claiming COVID-19 concerns, while police issued warning letters. On 18 August, a Ministry of Education department allowed students to hold rallies in state schools. However, in late August, student groups reported that at least 109 schools had suppressed or intimidated political expression.

As of December 2020, at least 234 people were arrested, with charges including sedition; five were arrested without charges. In early August, watchdog organization iLaw reported at least 78 incidents of intimidation of protest sympathizers. In early September, the police summonsed the first schoolchild protester for violating the security laws. At least 63 protesters have been charged under the controversial and repeatedly extended COVID-19 emergency decree, in 17 cases, despite the government claiming it would not be employed in this way. The people in police custody are sometimes found injured.

The state has attempted to severely restrict online freedom of speech. On 24 August, in response to a Thai government order, Facebook blocked access in Thailand to the million-member main Facebook page critical of the monarchy, Royalist Marketplace. Facebook is challenging the order in the courts. The authorities attempted to block more than 2,200 websites ahead of the 19 September rally. Following the rally, a minister filed a complaint to prosecute Facebook, Twitter, and YouTube for allowing anti-government content, the first time the Computer Crimes Act has been used against foreign service providers. A Thai media provider was reported to be censoring a foreign news network reporting the protests.

A severe state of emergency was declared in Bangkok during 15–22 October, during which the police moved to ban or block anti-government or independent media, together with the Free Youth Facebook page, and seized books criticizing the monarchy. Ministry of Digital Economy and Society stated it intended to prosecute internet service providers and online platforms which allows prohibited content, and reported about 320,000 illegal messages. In response, several Thai press associations issued a joint statement opposing suppression of the media. The authorities also required foreign diplomats to obtain advance permission to observe protests. An extraordinary parliamentary session was held 26–27 October to attempt to resolve the political situation.

Bangkok Metropolitan Administration lend its support to the counter-protesters by transporting them to the rally site, as well as accommodating them with trash trucks and mobile toilets.

Police crackdowns were also more frequent in 2021, seeing the use of batons, tear gas and water cannons. The police were also accused of torture and using live rounds, with the first protester died in October 2021 after being shot by a person inside a police station. Several prominent protesters were also facing "lawfare" from the authorities. In many occasions, those charged with lèse-majesté were denied bail and detained before trial, and many of them performed hunger strikes to call for their right of getting bail.

==== The Constitutional Court verdict ====
"The actions have hidden intentions to overthrow the constitutional monarchy and were not a call for reform,"

— A constitutional court judge, 2021

On 10 November 2021, the Constitutional Court ruled that Arnon, Panupong, and Panusaya of the 10-point call for reforms of the monarchy in 'Thammasat will not tolerate' rally on 10 August 2020 aimed to overthrow the state and the monarchy in their speeches. The court ordered them and other protest groups to end all monarchy reform movements. The petition was filed by Natthaporn Toprayoon on 3 September 2020.

Without examining the evidence submitted by the defendants, the court explained that such demands were an "abuse of the rights and freedoms and harmed the state's security", but the court did not enforce a punishment on them, only ruling on the constitutionality of their demands. Three protest leaders deny seeking to overthrow the monarchy, with their lawyer and Panusaya walked out of the middle of hearing. Sunai Phasuk, a senior researcher with Human Rights Watch, labelled the ruling as "a judicial coup" that could pave the way for further legal cases against protesters, including treason. The court also asserted that sovereign power belongs to the monarchy.

=== The King's position ===
The King and the palace initially did not express any public opinion about the protests. In August, the Asia Times quoted a government official stating that the King was not bothered by the "children's" protests, but an Al Jazeera article reported that the Thai monarchy has asked Thai media to censor mention of the ten demands.

On 16 October 2020, a speech by Vajiralongkorn the day before was made public, stating: "Now it is understood that the country needs people who love the country and love the monarchy". On 24 October, a video of the King praising former PDRC leader and ex-monk Buddha Issara and another counter-protester who raised a picture of late King Bhumibol Adulyadej during a protest was posted to a royalist Facebook group; royalists embraced it, while the protesters viewed the comment as a position statement, prompting the hashtag #23ตุลาตาสว่าง (23Oct Eyes Opened) to trend on the country's Twitter. He made the first public comment in November 2020: that he "love[s] them [Thai people] all the same," and "Thailand is the land of compromise."

Patrick Jory, a senior lecturer in Southeast Asian history at the University of Queensland, described the unpredictable nature of the King and "his willingness to use violence," and says that he may have pressured Prayut to suppress the protesters.

=== Support ===
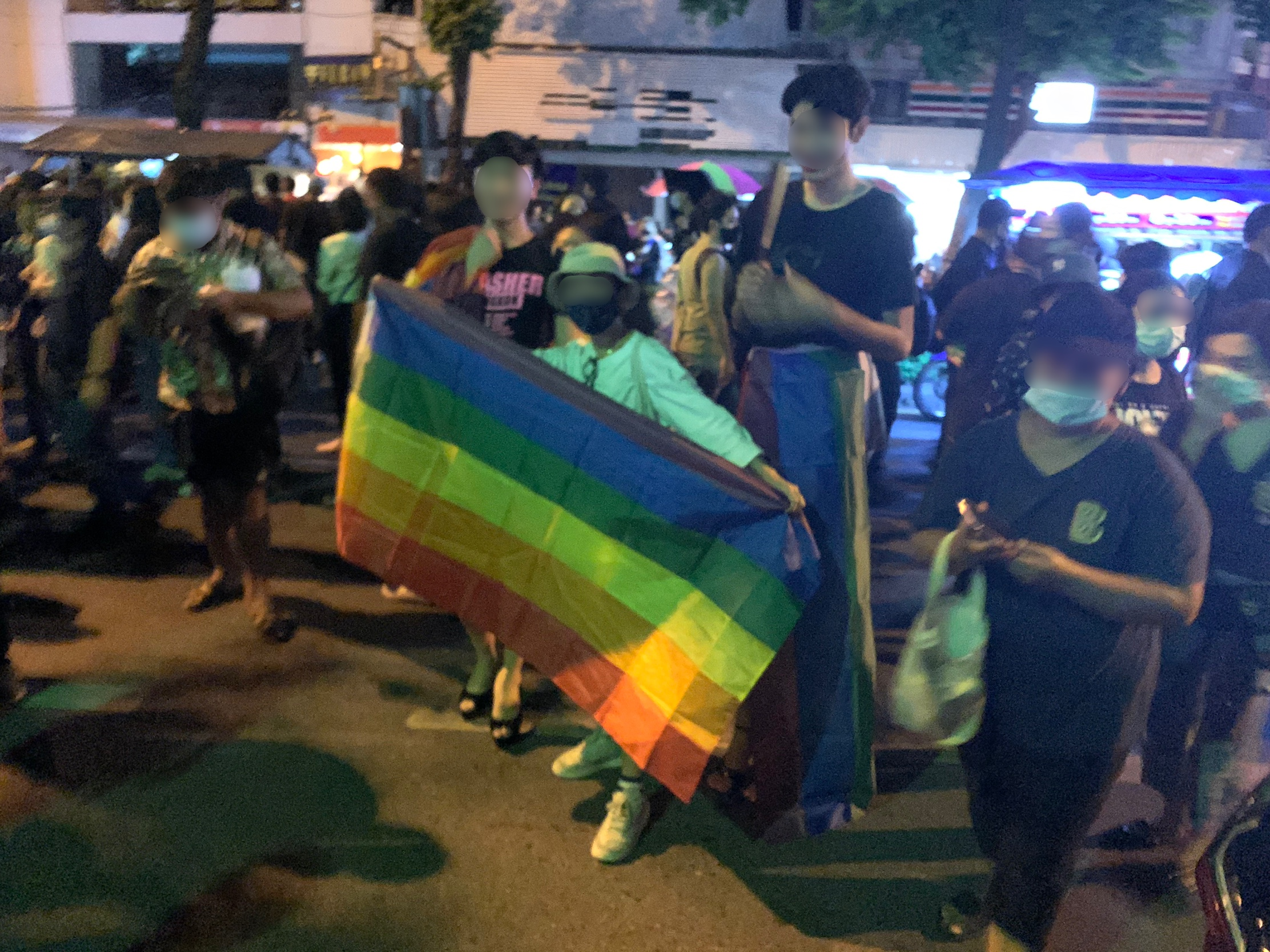
Protesters in Bangkok holding an LGBT pride flag

In August 2020, a Move Forward Party MP stated that some references to the monarchy in the protests were inconvenient truths that required attention. He received stark responses from Manager Online and General Apirat Kongsompong, who insisted that some protesters intended to overthrow the monarchy, or had fallen victim to third-party manipulators. In early September, the leader of the Pheu Thai Party, Sompong Amornwiwat, stated a motion from the opposition coalition to amend Article 256 was aligned with the demands of the protesters.

Despite threats to their careers, many Thai celebrities have publicly expressed support for the protesters. A group of 147 university faculty members has issued a statement saying the protesters' demand for monarchical reform did not violate the law. The Thai Academic Network for Civil Rights, another group of 358 scholars, has also expressed full support for the protesters. A physician was sacked for signing petition in support of the movement.

In August 2020, UNICEF issued a statement invoking the Convention on the Rights of the Child that called for schools and learning institutions to be safe havens and forums for children's freedom of expression. Office of the United Nations High Commissioner for Human Rights and Amnesty International recognized the peaceful nature of the rallies, and condemned police crackdowns. The Human Rights Watch Asia director stated, "Criminalizing peaceful protests and calls for political reform is a hallmark of authoritarian rule" and called for governments and the United Nations to condemn the repression of the protests and urge the release of protesters. Some international groups and individuals expressed their support for the movements, for example Hong Kong student protesters, including activist Joshua Wong. Civil society groups in South Korea urged their government to stop exporting water cannons to Thailand. UN human rights experts, including Clément Nyaletsossi Voule, Special Rapporteur on the Right to Freedom of Peaceful Assembly and of Association, issued a statement urging the government to guarantee the fundamental rights of free speech and peaceful assembly and to remove the ban on peaceful protests.

In October 2020, Khaosod English and Bangkok Post editorials called for Prayut to resign, but both did not press the demands to draft a new constitution and reform the monarchy.

=== Opposition ===
State-sponsored organized opposition to the protests emerged in August and included the accusation of a global conspiracy being funded or masterminded by a foreign government or NGOs. On 10 August, the Thai Move Institute released a diagram of an alleged 'people's revolution network' linking student protests to former FFP leader Thanathorn Juangroongruangkit and former prime minister Thaksin Shinawatra. The police and right-wing groups targeted Thanatorn and his allies for being accused of masterminding the protests. A singer and protester posted a video clip revealing a protester shot with live bullet by the counter-protesters. Groups of males with very short haircut and similar clothing are speculated to be out-of-uniform military or police officers who staged counter protests.

Right-wing media and organizations quickly attacked the August demands for monarchy reform, stating that the call to reform the monarchy was an act of evil, causing disunity and undermining the monarchy, and accusing the Pheu Thai Party and the former FFP of manipulating protesters. Most politicians expressed a negative reaction to the demands, including Sudarat Keyuraphan, an influential Pheu Thai politician. On social media platforms, user accounts, including ones coordinated by the ultra-royalist Rubbish Collection Organization, which has been characterized as fascist, attacked protesters, (Note: See its characterisation in:) some going so far as to urging child rape. In mid-September, Thailand's Constitutional Court accepted a complaint of treason against the 10 Demands protest leaders. Right-wing groups and media quickly attacked the protesters from the royal motorcade incident on 14 October.

At least 103 cases of harassment of students have been reported, and protesting tactics have been condemned; some considered a protester's act of hurling paint at police officers to be violent or not peaceful. Opponents also find vulgar language used by protest leaders unacceptable.

On 28 November 2020, Warong Dechgitvigrom, a right-wing physician formed the new right wing group "Thai Pakdee Party" (Thai: พรรคไทยภักดี ; lit. Loyal Thai), he also attacking the protester and supporting the government and the monarchy which he reacted to Jonathan Head, BBC News journalist during an interview in Bangkok he said that he believes if English people used the words against Queen Elizabeth, they would have been jailed a long time ago.

Royalist and pro-government media often ran stories which portrayed counter-protesters as victims, or the protesters as agitating for violence. Royalists believe that protesters want the monarchy dissolved, a position which they have denied. Some business known for supporting the regime, such as Foodpanda, issued a statement branding the movement "terrorists," prompting consumer boycott.

=== Polls ===
A national Suan Dusit poll from 16 to 21 August 2020 of 197,029 people found that 59.1% stated the students were making demands as permitted in a democracy, 62.8% agreed with the demand for reform of the Constitution and 53.9% agreed that the Prime Minister Prayut Chan-o-cha should "resign or dissolve parliament", while 59.5% agreed that the government should "stop intimidating" people. Overall support for the protests stood at 53.7%, with 41.2% opposed.

== Analysis ==
=== Protestor tactics and demands ===
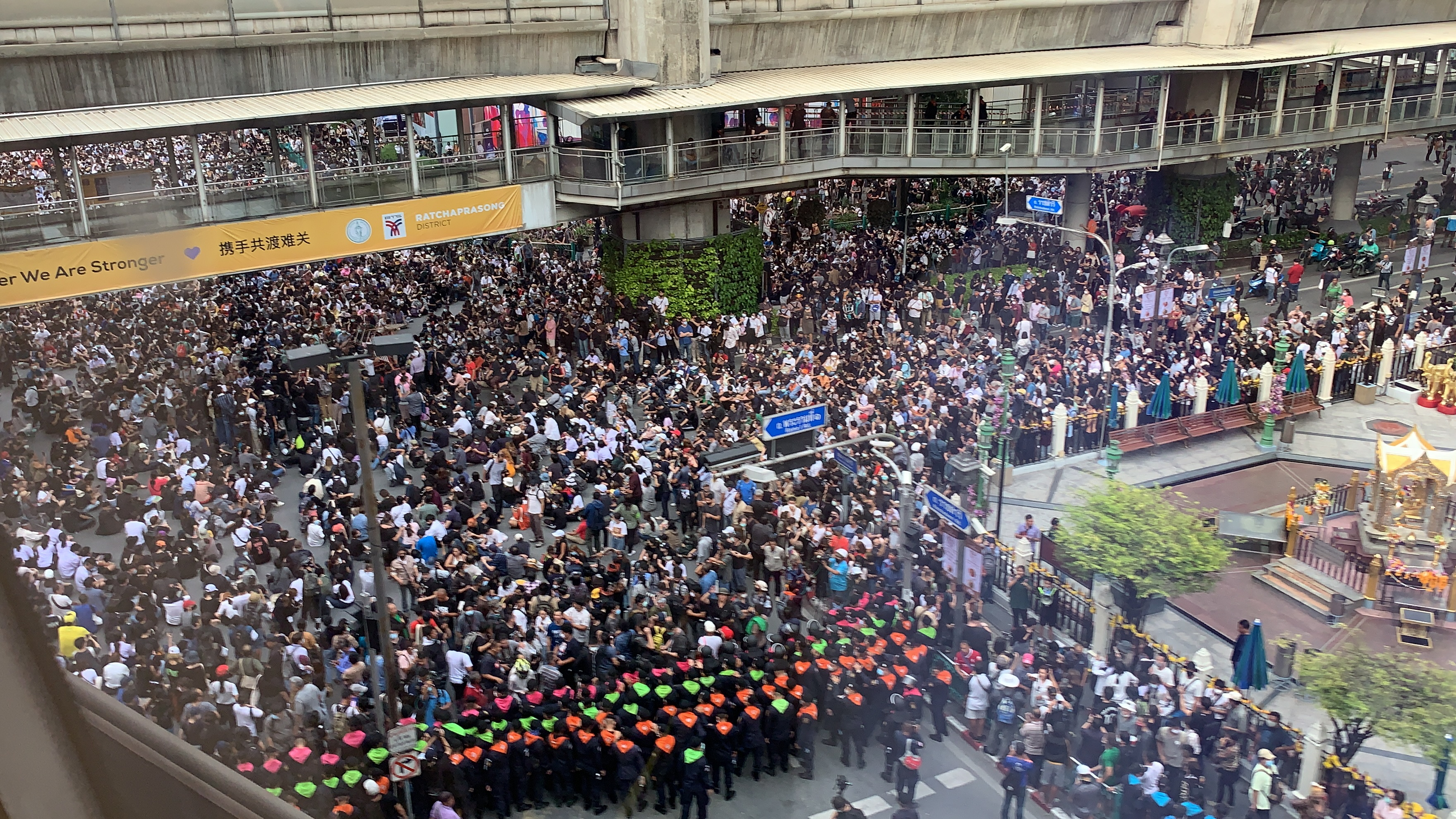
Protesters on 15 October at Ratchaprasong calling for reform and the release of their friends.

Some commentators say demands for monarchy reform before have only been made by fringe groups, yet there is consensus that this protest is the first time such demands have been discussed publicly. The calls may drive away some sympathisers, but if the government cracks down on the protests as a consequence, it could bring more support to the movement. In mid-August, Atith Keating wrote that student protests lack a coherent strategy; they do not have plans beyond day-to-day demonstrations. This may be caused by the lack of a centralised structure, as in the peak of student movements in the 1970s. Student protesters are seen as being more creative, networked, and technologically savvy than the government and as having time on their side, as well as being the targets of disproportionate persecution that could sway public opinion, with at least a chance of causing the government to collapse provided the anti-monarchy element does not provoke a backlash. One Bangkok Post columnist wrote that republican sentiment has never been stronger in Thailand, while another opined that the 19 September 2020 protest was a critical juncture for the movement, with the protesters needing to broaden their agenda again to wider societal reforms if it were to succeed. A political scientist professor opined that an absence of protest leaders increased the risk of the movement getting out of control and could further no strategic initiatives.

The protest movement's utilization of coordinated protest techniques, including the use of communications technology, memes, music and social media has contrasted with the traditional techniques used by law enforcement, such as police battalions, state propaganda, and water cannons. After the police crackdown on 16 October 2020, the hashtag #WhatsHappeningInThailand was created and heavily utilized, with content published in various languages across various social media platforms in order to attract global attention to the situation in the country.

In some rallies, most of the participants were women, including schoolgirls protesting for social change and against gender inequality and patriarchy.

After the arrest of many of Thai protest leaders, following their counterparts in Hong Kong, activists in Thailand changed their tactics. Claiming themselves to all be leaders, tactics such as holding up umbrellas in order to shield themselves from tear gas canisters have been used. According to AP, the protesters increasingly emphasize on the reform of the monarchy, but faced serious obstacles, including, notably, opposition party leaders who agreed with all their other demands. Thitinan Pongsudhirak, a political science professor from Chulalongkorn University, opined that the strength of the movement has been decreasing since the jailing of core leaders and the introduction of the hammer and sickle symbol in late 2020, and criticized the movement for being too ambitious and employing counterproductive tactics. Over time, internal divisions between various protest groups resulted in disintegration of the overall movement. However, Thai scholar Pavin Chachavalpongpun believed that the protests had already irrevocably expanded the space for criticism of the ruling elites, while Phil Robertson, deputy director of Human Rights Watch in Asia, thought that the resurgence of the activism could restart after the next general election.

=== Possibility of a coup ===
By September, protester pressure meant speculation about the possibility of a Thai military coup against Prayut increased, as his administration began to be viewed as increasingly untenable, and rumors became rife when a tank was spotted in the streets; the military stated, as is usual on such occasions, that this was part of a previously scheduled military exercise. However, this does not guarantee a more receptive audience to the protesters' demands as a palace-backed military faction is in ascendance. BBC correspondent Jonathan Head wrote that the authorities could end their tolerance of the protests since the King had returned to Thailand and might actively pursue those who they believed to fund the protesters.

Sonthi Limthongkul, former People's Alliance for Democracy leader, called for an intervention by the military, even though the prime minister and army commander dismissed its possibility.

=== Economic impact ===
Tamara Mast Henderson at Bloomberg argued that the unrest could lead to the change in the risk premium demanded by investors that hold Thai bonds.

=== "Judicial Coup" by the Constitutional Court ===
On 10 August 2021, the Constitutional Court ruling that reforms to the monarchy is unconstitutional opened further discussion about politics landscape in Thailand. Sunai Phasuk of Human Rights Watch described the ruling as "essentially a judicial coup" that could escalate more legal cases against protesters, possibility a treason. This could lead to an end to Thailand's constitutional monarchy rule and replacing with absolute monarchy. Jonathan Head of BBC described this ruling forcefully shuts down any room in Thailand for public discussion of the monarchy, but private discussion and social media discussion will continue on, regardless of the government efforts to stop. It was seen as another politicised intervention on the side of conservatives, royalists, by the independent court.

== See also ==
- Human rights in Thailand
- Death of Wichian Klanprasert
- Education for Liberation of Siam
- Milk Tea Alliance, online democratic movement made up of netizens from Hong Kong, Taiwan, Thailand, and Myanmar
- 2021–2022 Myanmar protests
- 2019–2020 Hong Kong protests
- Protests over responses to the COVID-19 pandemic
- 2023 Thai Election, the first general election after 2020–2021 protests
- National Endowment for Democracy
- Gaza war protests § Thailand
- Islamophobia
