= Benja Apan =

Thai pro-democracy activist (born 1999)

- เบนจา อะปัญ
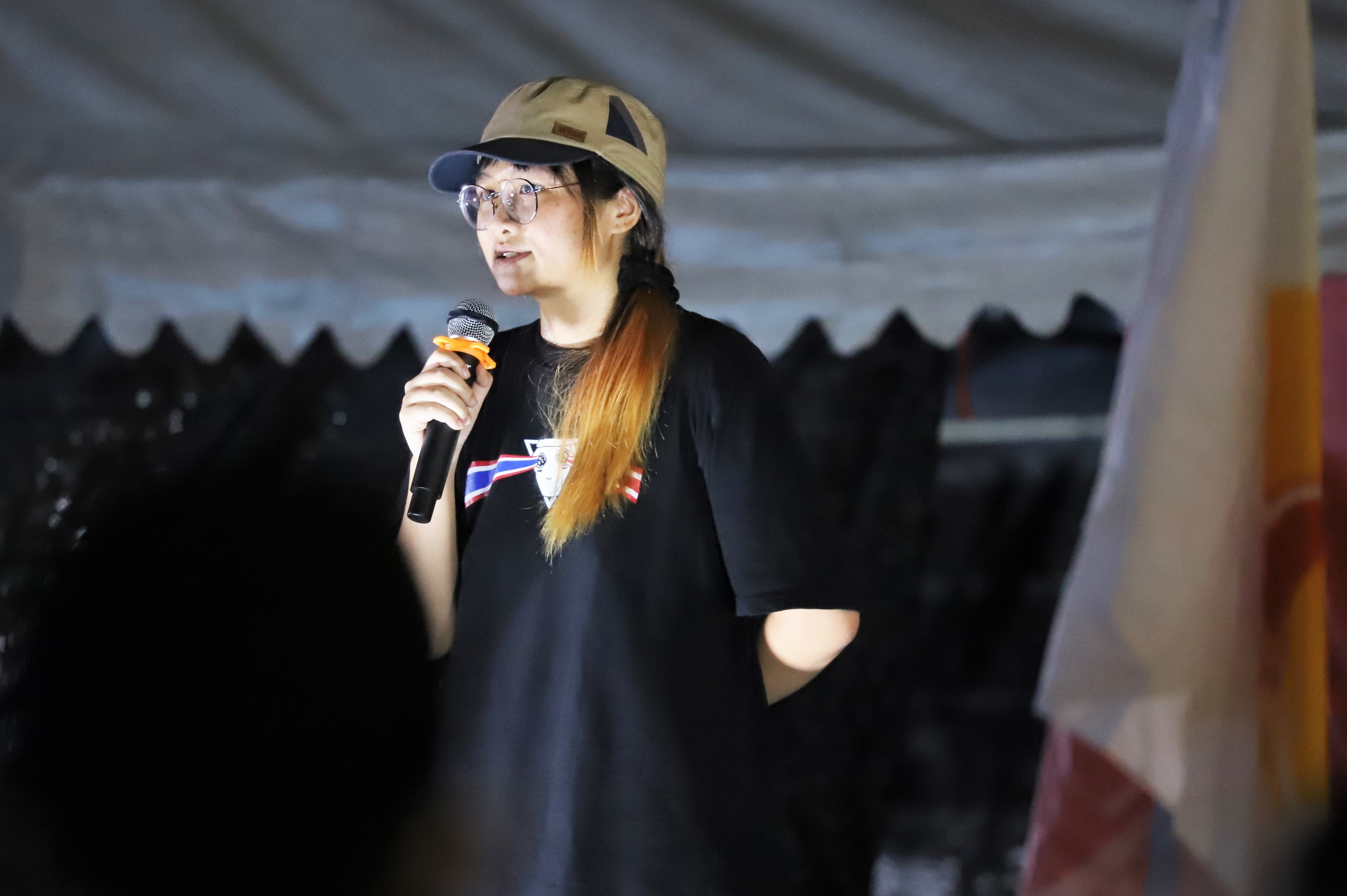
- Giving a speech on 3 September 2021 protest
- Born: Benjamaporn Apan; 1999 (age 26–27); Nakhon Ratchasima, Thailand
- Other name: Preaw
- Occupations: NGO; activist
- Years active: 2020–2025
- Known for: 2020–2021 Thai protests' co-leader

Benja Apan (Thai: เบนจา อะปัญ; RTGS: Bencha Apan; born 1999) is a Thai student and activist. In 2021, Apan became a prominent leader of the United Front of Thammasat and Demonstration (UFTD), a group that called for gradual reforms to the Thai monarchy. In the 2020–2021 Thai protests, she co-organized the 'German embassy in Bangkok' protest, which drew more than 10,000 protesters, and later UFTD's 'Car Mob' protest. She was arrested by Thong Lor police for lèse majesté following her 'Reforms to the Monarchy' speech in front of Sino-Thai tower, and imprisoned for 100 days in the Central Women's Correctional Institution.

== Activism (2020–2021) ==
Benja Apan studied engineering at Sirindhorn International Institute of Technology in Thammasat University, where she first joined the United Front of Thammasat and Demonstration group.

It was while Arnon Nampa, a co-leader of the Rasadon group, was detained that Apan assumed a key leadership position in the efforts of the activist group, organizing the 'German embassy in Bangkok' protest, which drew more than 10,000 protesters according to Nikkei Asia. Three days later, Thung Mahamek police charged her with sedition, along with Patsaravalee Tanakitvibulpon, Korakot Saengyenphan, Chanin Wongsri, and Cholathit Chote-sawat.

Apan gave her first speech on 7 November 2020 about sexism in the science industry.

On 19 January 2021, Apan held a protest at Iconsiam shopping mall, owned by Sirindhorn and Charoen Pokphand group, with signs that read "Monopolizing the vaccine to give the spotlight to the monarchy". The protest gained a lot of interest from Thai media, as she was harassed and assaulted by Iconsiam guards.

On 29 April, Apan and a group of other students sent an open letter to the Criminal Court, demanding the release of imprisoned activists such as Parit Chiwarak, which was signed by over 10,000 supporters. The judge who denied bail, Chanathip Muanpawong, was called to come to receive the letter, while Apan scattered sheets of paper printed with the names of 11,035 supporters on the stairs to the court building. She claimed that the students are not a threat to national security, but wanting to improve Thai society and for the monarchy to exist under the law.

Apan also led the 10 August 2021 UFTD 'Car Mob' protest, with the goal of asserting that the 2014 coup by Prime Minister Prayut Chan-o-cha benefited only the elite. She criticized the government's mishandling of the COVID-19 pandemic in Thailand, the economy reboot, revocation of the junta constitution, and reforming of state structures.

== Imprisonment (2021–2022) ==
Apan was arrested on 7 October and was charged with lèse majesté related to the 10 August 2021 'Car Mob' protest. She was denied bail and imprisoned while she awaited trial at Central Women Correctional Institution. On 4 November, she was sentenced to 6 months in prison for contempt of court. According to her lawyer, she was faced with the maximum jail term.

After 100 days of an arbitrary detention, on 14 January 2022, Apan was temporary released from imprisonment with a total bail cost of 200,000 baht, which was paid by the Ratsadornprasong fund. She was ordered to wear an electronic monitoring device, to stay home from 6 pm to 6 am, and was banned from travelling abroad without the court's permission.

== See also ==
- 2020–2021 Thai protests
- Human rights in Thailand
- Lèse-majesté in Thailand
- Panusaya Sithijirawattanakul
