= Panupong Jadnok =

Thai pro-democracy activist (born 1996)

- Born: 26 December 1996 (age 29); Rayong, Thailand
- Other name: Mike
- Education: Ramkhamhaeng University
- Occupations: NGO; activist
- Years active: 2020–2023
- Known for: 2020–2021 Thai protests' co-leader
- Awards: Jarupong Thongsin for Democracy Award (2020)

Panupong Jadnok (Thai: ภาณุพงศ์ จาดนอก; RTGS: Phanuphong Chatnok) is a social activist, Ramkhamhaeng University student, and a leading protester in the 2020 Thai protests, from the Eastern Youth Leadership group, currently facing multiple charges including sedition.

He was imprisoned without trial throughout the year of 2021, start from 9 February to 1 June, and 9 August to 15 September. On 24 September, he has been denied bail and detained await trial on Lèse-majesté for 1,802 days until today.

== Background ==
Panupong has a "grassroots" upbringing and is particularly popular with lower-middle class youth; he has worked with underprivileged youth in youth leadership programs.

== Activism ==
On 16 June 2020, Panupong was charged with violation of the Emergency Decree and the Public Assembly Act for a 14 June protest against the forced disappearance of Wanchalearm Satsaksit.

On 15 July, Panupong protested against Prime Minister General Prayut Chan-o-cha's visit to Rayong Province to address the Rayong coronavirus incident, for which he was arrested. On 18 July, Panupong was part of the 18 July Free Youth Movement protest at Democracy Monument in Bangkok which read out the 'Three Demands' before approximately 1,000 protesters, the largest since the 2014 military coup. On 7 August, Panupong and human rights lawyer Anon Nampa were arrested for speeches they had delivered at several rallies during the 2020 Thai protests, including for sedition, prompting a protest and at the police station where they were being held and statements by Amnesty International and Human Rights Watch calling for Panupong and other student protesters to be released and for charges to be dropped. They were subsequently released.

Panupong was then one of the four leaders of the 10 August rally which raised the issue of reform of the Thai monarchy, together with Panusaya Sithijirawattanakul, Arnon Nampa, and Nutchanon Pairoj, for which he is facing six charges. On 24 August, Panupong protested in Rayong against the proposed government sea reclamation project, part of the third phase expansion of the Map Ta Phut industrial estate Eastern Economic Corridor project. Panupong was again arrested, then released on bail, then re-arrested for violating his bail conditions and for refusing to request further bail, being released on 7 September. Panupong subsequently prepared for and then addressed the 19–20 September mass protest, where he emphasized the position to reform the monarchy, not abolish it.

== Imprisonment without trial: 2021– ==
On 9 February 2021, Panupong was sent to pretrial detention on Lèse-majesté charge. He had been detained for 86 days. On 1 June 2021, he was released on bail from Bangkok Remand Prison but imprisoned again on 9 August. He was released from the Thanyaburi Remand Prison on 15 September. On 24 September 2021, Panupong has been denied bail and detained on Lèse-majesté charge filed for a Facebook post about monarchy reform. He has been detained at the Bangkok Remand Prison since then.

On 10 November 2021, the Constitutional Court ruled that Panupong, Arnon, and Panusaya aimed to overthrow the state and the monarchy in their speeches. The court ordered them and other protest groups to end all monarchy reform movements. The petition was filed by Natthaporn Toprayoon on 3 September 2020.

== Awards & honors ==
- Jarupong Thongsin for Democracy Award, Thailand (2020)

== See also ==
- Parit Chiwarak
