= Patsaravalee Tanakitvibulpon =

Thai pro-democracy activist (born 1996)

- ภัสราวลี ธนกิจวิบูลย์ผล
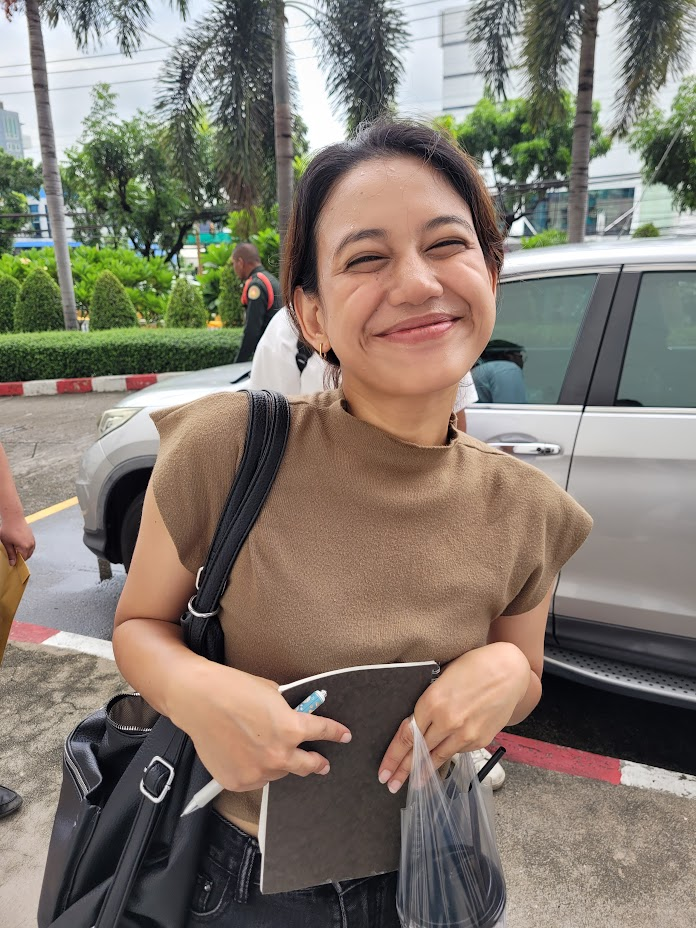
- Born: 1996 (age 29–30); Phra Phutthabat, Saraburi, Thailand
- Other name: Mind
- Education: Mahanakorn University of Technology
- Occupations: activist; journalist
- Years active: 2015–2023

Patsaravalee "Mind" Tanakitvibulpon (Thai: ภัสราวลี "มายด์" ธนกิจวิบูลย์ผล) is a Thai activist. Patsaravalee was a prominent figure in the 2020–2021 Thai protests, where she led calls for reform to the monarchy. In January 2024, she was found guilty of guilty of lèse majesté in connection with a speech she gave at a March 2021 protest. She received a 2-year suspended prison sentence, and faces two more lese-majeste charges in connections with protests at Parliament in September 2020 and the German Embassy in October 2020.
