= Jonathan Head =

English broadcast journalist

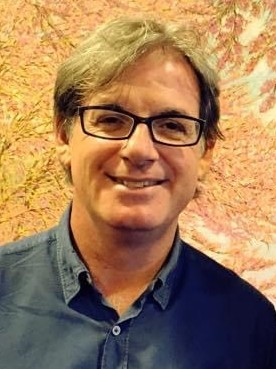
- Head in 2015
- Occupation: Correspondent
- Years active: 1991–present

Jonathan Head is the South East Asia Correspondent for BBC News, the main newsgathering department of the BBC, and its 24-hour television news channels BBC World News and BBC News Channel, as well as the BBC's domestic television and radio channels and the BBC World Service. He was formerly the BBC Indonesia Correspondent, South East Asia Correspondent, Tokyo Correspondent and Turkey Correspondent, with over 20 years' experience as a reporter, programme editor and producer for BBC radio and television. He became BBC South East Asia Correspondent in August 2012.

== Education ==
Head was educated at Dulwich College, a part-boarding independent school in the town of Dulwich in South London, between the years 1974–1978, followed by Pembroke College at the University of Cambridge where he completed a B.A. in history, and at the School of Oriental and African Studies at the University of London, where he completed an M.A. in South East Asian area studies.

== Life and career ==
Head joined the BBC in 1991, initially working for the BBC World Service international radio network and BBC World (now BBC World News) international satellite and cable television channel, before becoming BBC Indonesia Correspondent in 1996. He became BBC South East Asia Correspondent, based in Bangkok, in 2000, and BBC Tokyo Correspondent in 2003. He reported on the 2004 Boxing Day tsunami in Thailand, and returned to South East Asia in 2006 to report from a range of countries including Thailand, Vietnam, Laos, Cambodia, Malaysia, Singapore, Indonesia, Burma and East Timor.

In 2007, Head was Vice-President of the Foreign Correspondents' Club of Thailand (FCCT). In 2008, he was investigated for a possible charge of lèse-majesté, insulting the King of Thailand, by a police colonel, Watanasak Mungkijakarndee, who claimed that Head's reporting between 2006 and 2008 had "damaged and insulted the monarchy", and was warned that he could face up to 15 years in prison if convicted.

In 2009, he became BBC Turkey Correspondent, based in Istanbul, and in 2011 reported from Libya during the country's uprising, including the siege of Sirte.

He returned to Thailand for a third stint as BBC South East Asia Correspondent in August 2012, and was President of the Foreign Correspondents Club of Thailand (FCCT) for the 2014–15 term.

=== Defamation charges ===
In February 2017, a Thai lawyer, Pratuan Thanarak, brought charges of defamation and violating the country's Computer Crimes Act against Head, following his September 2016 investigative report of a fraud perpetrated on two Europeans who had invested in properties on Phuket island. Authorities seized Head's passport and imposed other bail terms, with the case expected to last two years.

The Committee to Protect Journalists called the charges "unwarranted" and criticised the "use of criminal defamation complaints in Thailand" which has "a chilling effect on journalists who fear being bogged down in time-consuming and expensive litigation". Reporters Without Borders also slammed the defamation laws and the Computer Crimes Act, saying that "journalists covering trials in Thailand often censor themselves out of fear of being accused and possibly going to prison for many years. Journalists have no hope of then being compensated, even when they demonstrate that the allegations brought against them are completely spurious". The charges were dropped on 23 August 2017, the first day of Head's trial.
