= Panusaya Sithijirawattanakul =

Thai pro-democracy activist (born 1998)

- ปนัสยา สิทธิจิรวัฒนกุล
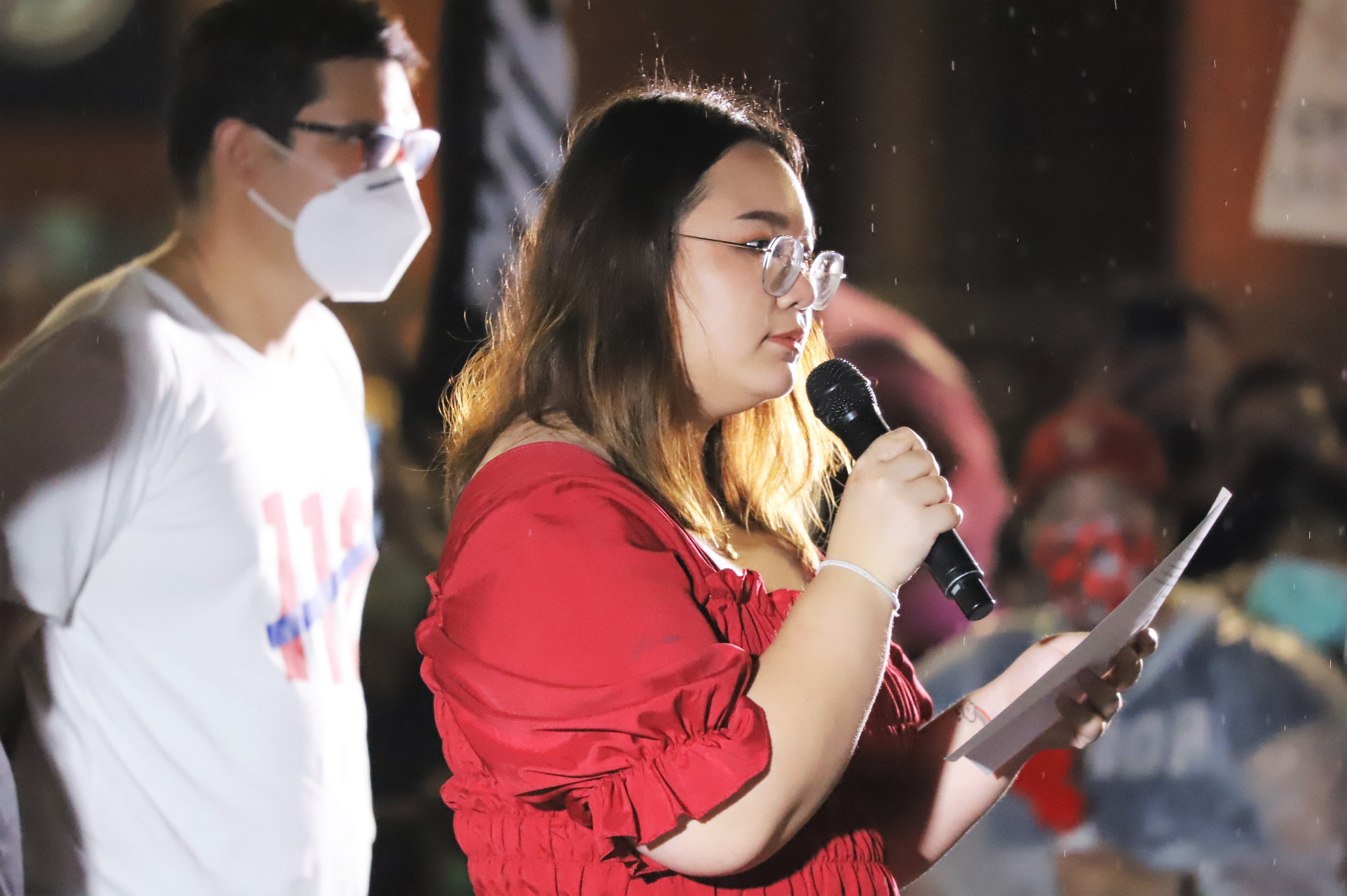
- Rung at Ratchaprasong protests in 2021
- Born: 15 September 1998 (age 27); Nonthaburi Province, Thailand
- Other names: Rung, Roong
- Occupations: Florist; activist
- Years active: 2020–2026
- Known for: 2020–2021 Thai protests' co-leader

Panusaya Sithijirawattanakul also known as Panasaya Sithijirawattanakul (Thai: ปนัสยา สิทธิจิรวัฒนกุล; RTGS: Panatsaya Sitthichirawatthanakun; nicknamed Rung or Roong; born 15 September 1998) is a Thai student political activist and university student leader who is also the spokesperson of the Student Union of Thailand. She is well known for her criticism of the Thai monarchy. During the 2020 Thai protests, she was one of the leaders who pioneered gradual reform demonstrations calling for major structural reform of the Thai monarchy.

== Biography ==
Panusaya Sithijirawattanakul was born in 1998 in Nonthaburi and was 19 at the time the youngest child in her family and has two sisters. She was born into a middle-class family which runs an auto workshop. She grew up with little political knowledge. Panusaya apparently had a quite introverted personality and grew up as quite a shy person. She was bullied by her friends at primary school. Her parents sent her to a five-month student exchange program in the United States which eventually helped her to express herself with more confidence and to be more proficient in public speaking.

She initially had little interest in politics. Her father strongly encouraged her to research politics following the 2014 Thai coup d'état. She became more interested in politics, having discussions and arguments on the subject with her friends at high school, after revising for her university entrance exams about the history of Thai politics. She is currently pursuing higher studies at the Faculty of Sociology and Anthropology at Thammasat University.

On October 15, 2020, Panusaya was arrested by the Royal Thai Police. On October 27, 2020, she was reported to be detained at the Central Women's Correctional Institution.

== Activism ==
Panusaya entered Thammasat University and became more interested in politics. She began her political activism as a third year undergraduate student. In 2018, she joined a student union political party called Dome Reformist. In February 2020, she was part of the fresh pro-democracy protests against the Constitutional Court's decision to abolish the Future Forward Party, a moderate reformist party which had the support of many Thai youth.

In June 2020, she was issued an arrest warrant for violating the COVID-19 safety measures and for breaching the COVID-19 pandemic emergency rule after taking part in a protest conducted by the Student Union of Thailand over the forced disappearance of prominent Thai activist Wanchalerm Satsaksit.

On 10 August 2020, she led demonstrations under the banner Thammasat will not tolerate calling for major monarchical reform and delivered a speech on a 10-point manifesto (the 'Thammasat Manifesto') in front of thousands of students. The speech was deemed controversial and sparked a political backlash in Thailand as authorities warned that the demonstration had seriously defamed the monarchy. Her speech included phrases such as "All humans have red blood. We are no different" and "No one in this world is born with blue blood", an allusion to the Thai monarchy. Following her controversial and widely reported comments, some critics and observers compared her to Agnes Chow of Hong Kong because of risking up to 15 years imprisonment under the provisions of the Thai lèse majesté law.

On 20 September 2020, Panusaya along with fellow activists and protesters installed a people's plaque near Grand Palace in Bangkok. The protesters claimed victory after submitting their monarchical reform demands to the authorities.

On 10 November 2021, the Constitutional Court ruled that Panusaya, Arnon, and Panupong aimed to overthrow the state and the monarchy in their speeches. The court ordered them and other protest groups to end all monarchy reform movements. The petition was filed by Natthaporn Toprayoon on 3 September 2020.

After being jailed for Article 112, she went on hunger strike in protest from 30 March 2021.

== Awards ==
She was on the list of the BBC's 100 Women announced on 23 November 2020.

== See also ==
- 2020–2022 Thai protests
- Anon Nampa
- Parit Chiwarak
- Panupong Jadnok
- Benja Apan
