= Delaying tactic =

Deliberate action to guide decisions to achieve beneficial outcome

A delaying tactic or delay tactic is a strategic device sometimes used during business, diplomatic or interpersonal negotiations, litigation and other circumstances, in which one party seeks to gain an advantage by postponing an action or decision. Someone uses a delaying tactic when they expect to have a stronger negotiating position at a later time. They may also use a delaying tactic when they prefer the status quo to any of the potential resolutions, or to impose costs on the other party to compel them to accept a settlement or compromise. Delay tactics are also sometimes used as a form of indirect refusal wherein one party postpones a decision indefinitely rather than refusing a negotiation outright. To use a delaying tactic, the delaying party must have some form of control over the decision-making process.

== Delaying tactics in psychology ==
Delaying tactics can be employed, either intentionally or subconsciously, as a coping mechanism to avoid making difficult decisions or performing unpleasant tasks. The reasons that an individual may use delay tactics may vary, but motivations often include maintaining control and avoiding change; especially when this change is unwanted. By delaying a decision, the individual avoids committing to a course of action that could lead to limited autonomy or feelings of loss of control. This kind of delay tactic is often seen as a fear of commitment, when an individual would rather remain undecided than commit to any specific option available to them. A closely related phenomenon is opportunity cost, wherein an individual is unwilling to forgo other available options to commit to one.

Delay tactics can also be the result of denial if an individual is unwilling to accept any of the available options, especially when choosing between multiple negative outcomes. An individual may delay making a decision in the hope that a better option will become available or that the decision will be made for them by others or by changing circumstances. Delay tactics and indecision can be a symptom of mild to severe mental disorders such as depression and anxiety.

Delaying and indecision can also be the result of fear of making a poor choice. This can stem from an obsessive desire to identify the optimal solution by gathering more information. This can result in the decision being postponed indefinitely, especially in situations where some degree of uncertainty is unavoidable. This can be further exacerbated if the individual has trauma associated with the consequences of their past decisions.

=== Delaying tactics' survival value ===
Delaying tactics are a part of the body's natural response to perceived threats. Freezing is an automatic, involuntary response to fear. This tactic delays other responses, allowing for more time to process the situation and gather information before taking any action. Freezing may also occur when neither fight nor flight is an available option. If there is no decision to make, freezing is not a delaying tactic.

== Related negotiation tactics ==
- Active silence: a negotiator uses silence skillfully to induce a targeted discomfort among the other parties: such silence serves as a sign that the negotiator is confident and expects a response.
- Bigger picture: The negotiator makes light of the proposed issue, and turns the focus to a wider discussion.
- Bluff: The negotiator makes a false claim, as if he has better offers from other parties.
- Bogeyman: The negotiator introduces a false threat or warning.
- Changing the Negotiator: The negotiator is changed to reset the progression made thus far.
- Control the Agenda: The negotiator controls the agenda, and the priorities to control what is discussed and when.
- Discovery challenges: A negotiator stalls for time by claiming they had a hard time finding or doing what the other party asked for.
- Divide and conquer: The negotiator creates an internal conflict between other, opposing parties.
- Ellsberg paradox or also ambiguity aversion: The negotiator uses the human bias toward the option they know most about, regardless of its merits.
- Empty Promises: The negotiator makes promises that they know they will not keep.
- Feather ruffling: The negotiator utilizes personal attack to divert the discussion to the involved parties instead of the results.
- Fragmentation: The negotiator breaks the discussion into minor discussions.
- Introducing a new issue: The negotiator introduces a new issue during the negotiation for distraction.
- Jurisdictional challenges: A delaying tactic in court in which another group prolongs the case by claiming it is their jurisdiction.
- Late objections: The negotiator makes an objection late in the negotiation, to set it back to square one.
- Limited Authority, Absent Authority or Missing person tactic: The negotiator declares their limited ability to make a decision, they also claim that the person who can make the decision is not available at the moment, drawing out the process.
- Logrolling: The negotiator concedes on low-priority items to them.
- Overwhelming: The negotiator provides other parties with too much requests or information to overload them.
- Questioning goals: The negotiator debates the value of other parties' ultimate goals.
- Phasing: The negotiator offers to phase in or out the requested changes, buying themselves more time.
- Playing Dumb: The negotiator acts stupid to avoid confrontations.
- Selective listening: The negotiator overlooks certain fragments of the other parties' argument hearing what they want to, rather than what is actually being said.
- Taking something back: The negotiator offers something only to take it back later.

== Examples ==
- A common type of delay tactic in politics is the filibuster, wherein a party attempts to prevent a vote on a proposed piece of legislation by prolonging the debate of that legislation indefinitely.
- In Newcastle, England, delay tactics are built into the criminal justice system. Police and prosecutors delayed charging suspects for crimes for up to four years waiting for sufficient evidence to release or convict them. The delay of prosecution could potentially lead to dangerous criminals being able to reenter the public while under investigation, making this a controversial use of delaying tactic.
- In Queensland, Australia, the Australian Conservation Foundation (ACF) is utilizing the legal system to delay projects that have already been approved on state and local levels. By running the proposed changes through the legal system over and over, the foundation is preventing environmental changes and development. This provides a legal way of conserving land, however, it also prevents economic development and change.
- In England, politicians have accused the Secretary of State of improperly using delay tactics to stop compensation payments to abuse victims. The compensation has been delayed for two and half years, which has led to calls for resignation. Public pressure has drawn the declaration that compensation will be made, but the delay persists.
- In the United States, the Food and Drug Administration (FDA) has been accused of using delaying tactics to prevent lower-cost generic drugs from reaching the market. The FDA takes time to determine purpose and effectiveness of a drug so they can determine how to best train doctors on the risks and symptoms of the drugs. The misuse of the "risk evaluation and mitigation strategies" has disproportionately delayed lower-cost drugs from hitting the market.
- Delay tactics have been used by banks to make it difficult to change providers or move their money to a better, cheaper, alternative. This is done by making customers pass through a series of tedious legal hurdles and/or by drawing out the response time it takes to switch providers. The process is also sometimes delayed by using ambiguous and confusing language, which makes it harder for individuals to know what kind of service they will lose or gain.
- In the UK courts, Lord Oliver in the House of Lords commented in the case of Donovan v Gwentoys (1990) that in a civil case, "a defendant is always likely to be prejudiced by the dilatoriness of a plaintiff pursuing his claim". He noted that, with the passage of time, witnesses' fading memories, loss or destruction of records, and opportunities to inspect or record a situation can all add to the difficulties experienced by defendants in resisting a claim made against them.

== See also ==
- List of logical fallacies
- List of cognitive biases
- Perverting the course of justice
- Procrastination
