= Parit Chiwarak =

Thai political activist (born 1998)

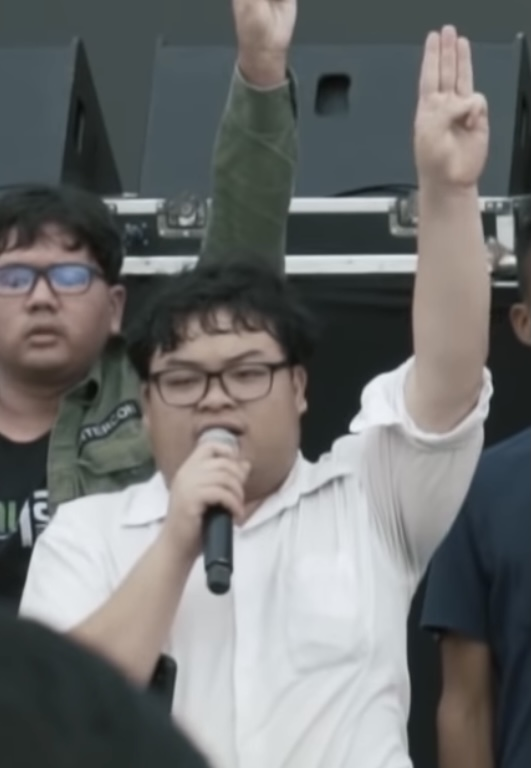
- Born: 27 July 1998 (age 28); Lampang, Thailand
- Other name: Penguin
- Education: Thammasat University
- Occupations: Activist; student
- Years active: 2015–present
- Known for: 2020–2021 Thai protests' co-leader
- Awards: Jarupong Thongsin for Democracy Award (2021)

Parit Chiwarak (Thai: พริษฐ์ ชิวารักษ์; RTGS: Pharit Chiwarak, born 27 July 1998), nicknamed Penguin, is a Thai political activist, Thammasat University student at the Faculty of Political Science, and one of the leaders of the 2020 Thai protests, via the United Front of Thammasat and Demonstration group. He spent several periods in prison on bail, having been arrested under a variety of charges, but was released in order to complete his studies. In July 2024 he was sentenced to a two-year prison term for lese-majeste, but he was absent from court and a warrant was issued for his arrest.

== High-school student activism ==
Parit first came to media attention in 2015 at the age of 16, when he was General Secretary of the Education for Liberation of Siam (ELS) group, a progressive student group campaigning for education reform, by campaigning for maintaining access to education in the face of a junta proposal to reduce the number of free years of education.

As a student at Bangkok's prestigious Triam Udom Suksa School, he displayed a banner before Thai junta leader General Prayut Chan-o-cha asking how Thai children could avoid corruption. In 2016, he was lauded for advocating against the 2016 junta-sponsored draft Thai Constitution on the grounds that it could remove 15 years of free education. He was threatened with the 2007 Computer Crime Act for performing in a music video against draft constitution. Parit also campaigned against the SOTUS system (Seniority, Order, Tradition, Unity, and Spirit), a set of hierarchical normative values for Thailand's tertiary education institutions that emphasizes seniority and hazing. In 2017, Parit was involved in an ELS satire of Thailand's National Children's Day.

== University student activism ==
In February 2019, Parit demonstrated against Thai general Apirat Kongsompong's decision to broadcast the controversial Cold War military anthem ‘Nak Phaen Din’ (‘Scum of the Earth’) on the grounds that the song incited hatred and was charged with violating the 2015 Public Assembly Act.

In June 2020, Parit was involved in a small protest that involved tying white ribbons around Bangkok to highlight the forced disappearance of Thai activist Wanchalearm Satsaksit in Cambodia. He was subsequently charged under Section 12 of the 1992 Act on the Maintenance of the Cleanliness and Orderliness of the Country. On 8 June, the SUT, led by Parit as former president of the SUT and spokesperson Panusaya Sithijirawattanakul organized a small public protest at Pathumwan Police Station against the prolongation of the COVID-19-related Emergency Decree. On 24 June, Parit led a Student Union of Thailand protest, one of 15 such protests, to commemorate the 88th anniversary of the 1932 Siamese Revolution. The next month, Parit was involved in the “Free Youth” rally in Bangkok on the 18th, the largest Thai political protest since the 2014 military coup.

On 12 August, Thammasat University Student Union mobilized student guards to prevent Parit and Panusaya from being arrested by the police in an event that gained significant attention on social media. Parit and others were arrested on 14 August on sedition and other charges related to his involvement in the July 18 protest, following which Human Rights Watch issued a statement calling on Thai authorities to immediately drop all charges and unconditionally release him and the other student protesters. He was released on bail the following day and subsequently became one of the leaders of the September protests.

== Arrests and imprisonment ==
Parit was first arrested in mid-August 2020 and then released on bail, and faced 18 charges, from violating cleanliness laws to sedition.

He was in prison as of February 2021, having been denied bail. He began a hunger strike on 15 March 2021, and was hospitalised on 30 April 2021 over concerns of shock if his condition worsened and require specialised care.

He was granted bail as of 11 May 2021. In August 2021, he was imprisoned again; his bail had been revoked "after a court accepted a prosecution submission that he had broken bail conditions". In February 2022, he was freed after spending over six months in jail on bail to resume his studies at Thammasat University. Upon his release, he flashed a three-finger protest salute sign.

On 31 July 2024 the Criminal Court sentenced him to two years in prison on a charge of lese-majeste. He was absent from court for the sentencing, and a warrant was issued for his arrest.

== Awards & honors ==
- Jarupong Thongsin for Democracy Award, Thailand (2021)

== See also ==
- Arnon Nampa
