= May 18 Memorial Foundation =

Organization based in South Korea

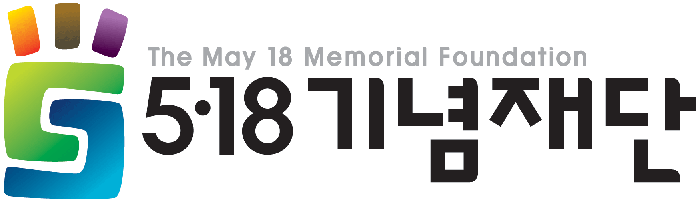
- Founded: 1994; 32 years ago
- Type: Non-profit NGO
- Purpose: Commemorate and promote the spirit of struggle and solidarity of the May 18 Uprising
- Headquarters: 152 Naebang-ro Seo-gu Gwangju, 61965; Gwangju, South Korea
- Region served: Gwangju, South Korea, Asia and beyond
- Website: eng.518.org//

The May 18 Memorial Foundation (Korean: 5·18기념재단; Hanja: 5·18紀念財團) is a prominent organization based in the city of Gwangju, South Korea, with a view to commemorate and develop the spirit of struggle and solidarity of the Gwangju Uprising, also known as the May 18 Democratic Uprising and May 18 Gwangju Uprising. The organization was founded in 1994 by the May 18 victims, Gwangju citizens, overseas Koreans and Korean nationals, who believe in promoting the May 18 spirit to respect the sacrifice of the victims, strengthen democracy of modern Korea and to stand in solidarity with the democratic struggles in Asia and beyond.

== Background ==
About the background and context of establishing the foundation, its website page reads: "May means a sacrifice for us rather than an unhealed wound. May is history that is to be remembered not only for the victims of the May 18 Democratization Movement but also for all citizens in Korea. In addition, people need to learn the May Spirit from a realistic perspective in order to spread the Spirit to the world. In this respect, the May 18 Memorial Foundation was established to do various projects related to the May 18 Democratization Movement such as commemorative, scholarship, research, culture, and publication projects."

The organization also helps promote and protect democracy, human rights and peace building regionally and internationally.

== Major Achievements ==
=== Asian Declarations on Rights to Justice, Peace and Culture ===
In May 2018, Asian Declarations on a right to justice, a right to peace and a right to culture were announced in the city of Gwangju by the May 18 Memorial Foundation along with Asian Human Rights Commission. These declarations, also known as the "Gwangju Declarations" were made to commemorate the Gwangju pro-democratic movement of 1980. According to The Korea Herald article written by Praveen Kumar Yadav, international intern at the May 18 Memorial Foundation, "The main objective of bringing about the Gwangju Declarations was to identify the gaps and challenges in addressing human rights violations in Asia, and to suggest effective measures to resolve the problems. The declarations are added to the Asian Human Rights Charter: A People's Charter 1998."

=== 'Asian Human Rights Charter: A People's Charter 1998 ===
In May 1984, Asian Human Rights Charter: A People's Charter was promulgated in the city of Gwangju with a joint effort of Hong Kong-based Asian Human Rights Commission (AHRC) and the May 18 Memorial Foundation. The Asian charter was inspired from the great struggles for democracy and freedom in Asia, including the struggles of the Gwangju citizens in 1980.

=== Gwangju Human Rights Prize ===
The Gwangju Prize for Human Rights is a regular award given by the May 18 Memorial Foundation to recognize "individuals, groups or institutions in Korea and abroad that have contributed in promoting and advancing human rights, democracy and peace through their work." The award is intended to commemorate the spirit of the May 1980 Gwangju Democratization Movement (also known as "518" for its 18 May start), in which pro-democracy citizens battled soldiers in protest of the military reign of Chun Doo-hwan.

This prize, that carries a cash award of USD50,000 has been provided since 2000. Here is the list of the winners of the Gwangju Prize for Human Rights.

Father Nandana Manatunga from Sri Lanka bagged the latest Gwangju Prize for Human Rights for his and team's struggle that has helped secure convictions against perpetrators of rape and torture.

== List of Gwangju Prize for Human Rights Laureates ==
Year	Awardee	Country
2023	Chow Hang-tung	Hong Kong
2022	Cynthia Maung	Myanmar
2021	Arnon Nampa	Thailand
2020	Bedjo Untung	Indonesia
2019	Joanna Cariño	Philippines
2018	Fr. Nandana Manatunga	Sri Lanka
2017	Jatupat Boonpattararaksa	Thailand
2016	Nguyen Dan Que	Vietnam
2016	Bersih	Malaysia
2015	Latifah Anum Siregar	Indonesia
2014	Adilur Rahman Khan	Bangladesh
2014	Mothers of Khavaran	Iran
2013	H.I.J.O.S	Argentina
2012	Mun Jeong Hyeon	South Korea
2011	Binayak Sen	India
2010	Sushil Pyakurel	Nepal
2009	Min Ko Naing	Myanmar
2008	Muneer A. Malik	Pakistan
2007	Irom Chanu Sharmila	India
2007	Lenin Raghuvanshi	India
2006	Malalai Joya	Afghanistan
2006	Angkhana Neelaphaijit	Thailand
2005	Wardah Hafidz	Indonesia
2004	Aung San Suu Kyi (withdrawn)	Myanmar
2003	Dandeniya Gamage Jayanthi	Sri Lanka
2002	Korean Association of Bereaved Families for Democracy	South Korea
2001	Basil Fernando	Sri Lanka
2000	Xanana Gusmão	East Timor

== See also ==
- Gwangju Uprising
- May 18th National Cemetery
- Gwangju Prize for Human Rights
- A Taxi Driver
