= Arnon Nampa =

Thai pro-democracy activist (born 1984)

- อานนท์ นำภา
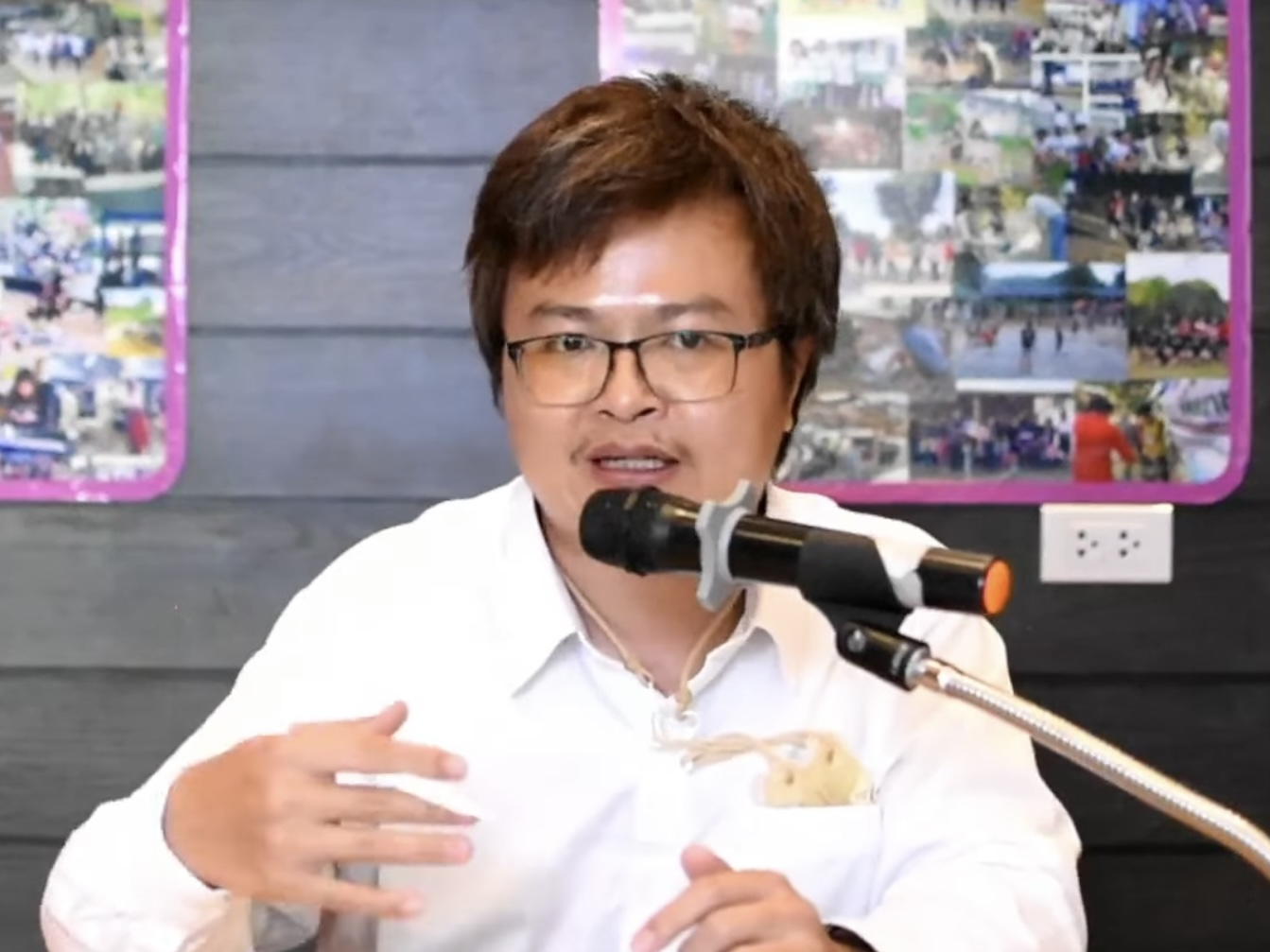
- Arnon Nampa in 2022
- Born: 18 August 1984 (age 42); Thung Khao Luang district, Roi Et province, Thailand
- Education: Ramkhamhaeng University (LLB); Thai Bar Association (BL)
- Occupations: NGO; activist
- Years active: 2010–present
- Known for: 2020–2021 Thai protests' co-leader
- Children: 1
- Awards: Jarupong Thongsin for Democracy Award (2020); Gwangju Prize for Human Rights (2021)

Arnon Nampa (Thai: อานนท์ นำภา; RTGS: Anon Nampha; born 18 August 1984) is a Thai lawyer and activist known for his critical stance on the Thai monarchy, a highly controversial topic in the country. Initially celebrated as a leading human rights defender, Nampa's involvement in pro-democracy movements has led to numerous criminal charges. He became a key figure in the 2020–2021 Thai protests, advocating for unprecedented reforms to the monarchy led by non-elite groups. In 2020, Nampa was detained without trial for 24 days. Following Prime Minister Prayuth Chan-o-cha's directive in November 2020 to enforce all applicable laws, including lèse-majesté, against demonstrators, Nampa's detention was extended to 110 days. After being released on bail in June 2021, he was detained again from 9 August 2021, to 27 February 2022, resulting in a total of 203 days without trial during this period, and 337 days of detention between 2020 and 2022.

On 17 January 2024, Nampa was sentenced to four years in prison for lèse-majesté related to his 2021 social media activities. On 28 July 2024, he received an additional four-year sentence for defaming the royal family and violating the Computer Crime Act through two social media posts from early 2021.

== Early life ==
=== Roi Et: 1984–2003 ===
Arnon Nampa was born on 18 August 1984, in Thung Khao Luang, a village previously part of Thawat Buri, Roi Et Province, Thailand. Born into a family of rice farmers, he pursued his secondary education at Roi Et Wittayalai, a provincial school, where he earned the nickname คอมมิวนิสต์น้อย, 'The Little Communist' due to his vocal criticism of certain school practices. Nampa was known for his rebellious activities, including posting critical poems and flyers around the school, and organizing student protests against changes to the school schedule that would adversely affect rural students' commutes.

During his initial three years at the school, which was then an all-male institution, Nampa advocated for coeducation, a stance that contributed to his election as student council president in 2002. During his presidency, he raised awareness about historical events like the 6 October 1976 massacre and initiated a co-ed sports event. He also achieved first place in a regional law-related student competition. Chamlong Daoruang, an alumnus of Roi Et Wittayalai and member of the Free Thai Movement, significantly influenced Nampa during this period.

=== Arriving in Bangkok: 2003–2007 ===
Initially drawn to poetry, he considered joining the Thai language program at Mahasarakham University's Faculty of Education in 2003, but ultimately found it unappealing and chose not to enroll. Instead, he explored the history of Thammasat University, and subsequently joined its Faculty of Sociology and Anthropology. However, after two months, he transferred to study law at Ramkhamhaeng University.

In 2005, Nampa, alongside other student activists, initially supported the People's Alliance for Democracy during the 2005–2006 Thai political crisis, adopting an anti-authoritarian stance against Thaksin Shinawatra. Following the 2006 Thai coup d'état, he shifted his position to oppose the coup and joined Sombat Bunngam-anong's 19 September Network against Coup d'Etat group, participating as a poet. He also became involved in the 'black shirt' protests led by Giles Ji Ungpakorn.

After Nampa graduated with a law degree in 2006, he was drafted to the military for one year. In 2007, he successfully passed the bar exam before his military service concluded. He achieved his first legal victory in the Military courts of Thailand, representing a fellow conscripted colleague.

== Human rights lawyer: 2007–2014 ==
=== Red Shirts lawyer: 2007–2010 ===
In 2007, Nampa began an internship at the EnLAW Thai Foundation, under the guidance of Surachai Trongngam. During his internship, he was involved in defending human rights in several cases, including the protests against the Sahaviriya steel mill project in Bang Saphan District, police actions during the Thai-Malay gas pipeline project protest, and the assassination-related protests against coal power plants in Bo-Nok and Ban-Krut. These experiences heightened his awareness of human rights issues. His internship concluded in 2008, and he subsequently embarked on his legal career independently. He received a barrister degree from the Thai Bar Association in 2009.

Following the 2010 crackdown on the 'Red Shirts', and the establishment of the Centre for Resolution of Emergency Situation (CRES) by the army, Nampa represented the กลุ่มวันอาทิตย์สีแดง, 'Red Sunday Group' led by Sombat Bunngam-anong. Media outlets referred to him as the "ทนายความวันอาทิตย์สีแดง", 'Red Sunday Lawyer' due to his legal support during this period. His adept handling of court cases during the political crisis following the coup earned him recognition as the 'Red Shirts Lawyer'. He also took on significant lèse-majesté cases involving red-shirt activists, including those of Chotisak Onsoong and Suwicha Thakor, as the political tensions escalated.

=== Ratsadornprasong Law Office: 2011–2014 ===
In 2011, Nampa established a pro bono law firm called 'Ratsadornprasong Law Office' with two other attorneys. The firm specialized in representing red-shirt protesters in almost 100 cases and individuals charged with lèse-majesté during political conflicts. Noteworthy cases included the defense of over twenty individuals accused in the Mukdahan Provincial Off arson, with charges dismissed in 2019. The firm also advocated for the welfare and reparations of impoverished families of detained red-shirt protesters and took on significant cases such as those of Ampon Tangnoppakul, also known as 'Uncle SMS', Thantawut Taweewarodomkul, and Joe Gordon, who was involved in translating the controversial book The King Never Smiles. Additionally, the firm supported the operation of the People's Information Center: The April-May 2010 Crackdowns (PIC) and contributed to the 'Nuamthong' film project.

The firm ceased operations in 2013 amid escalating political tensions leading up to the 2014 Thai coup d'état. It transitioned into the 'Ratsadornprasong Fund', which continued to support political activists facing prosecution under the strict military regime.

Two days after the 2014 Thai coup d'état, Nampa and his colleagues founded the Thai Lawyers for Human Rights (TLHR) to address the needs of those arrested, summoned, or detained by the military junta, including those facing military court proceedings. Nampa then worked as a freelance lawyer, taking cases from TLHR. He subsequently pursued a career as a human rights lawyer, defending notable activists such as Aekachai Hongkangwan and Phai Dao-din.

== Early activism: 2014–2019 ==
=== Resistant Citizen: 2014–2017 ===
Arnon Nampa co-founded the Resistant Citizen group in January 2015 after he organized many experimental protests and the 'Coup Down People Rise 2015' party, a symbolic event at the Democracy Monument on 31 December 2014. The group released multiple YouTube parodies and performance arts about the coup, in which he played the main role in 'Chub Yei Chan-O-Cha' (Kiss to mock the moon, O-Cha). The moon in Thai is 'Chan', he dressed as Prayut Chan-o-cha in a military uniform in the parody music video.

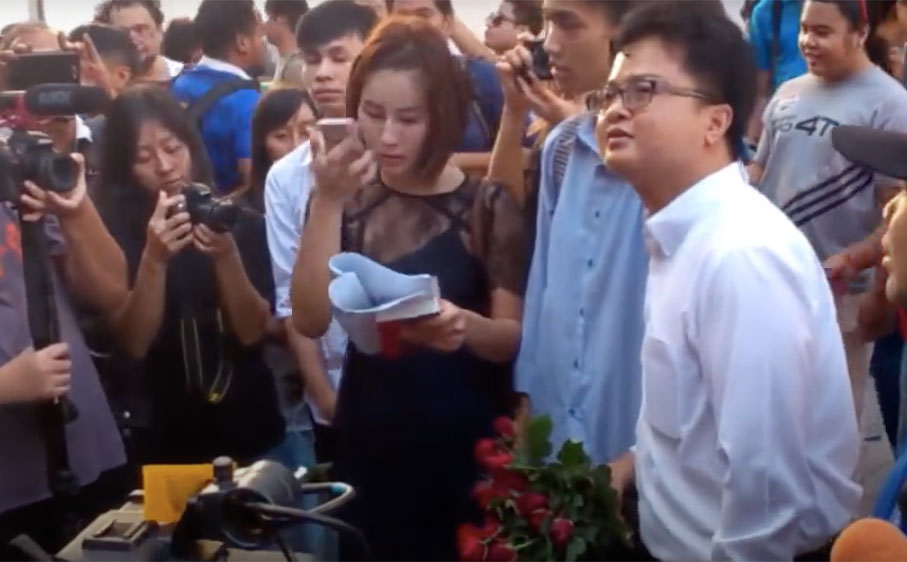
Arnon leading the 'Election that We (Love) was Stolen' protest at Bangkok Art and Culture Centre on Valentine's Day (14 Feb.) 2015

The Resistant Citizen group set up the 'Election that We (Love) Stolen' event at Bangkok Art and Culture Centre on Valentine's Day, 14 February. They also staged a mock election to recall the February 2 February 2014 election which was rescinded, attracting about 300 people. Nampa, Siravich Sereethiwat, Punsak Srithep, and Wannakiat Chusuwan were arrested and charged by Army Col. Burin Thongprapai with violating the military junta order prohibiting an assembly of more than five people. He was bailed out after being detained one night at the Phayathai police station. He gained a lot of attention from the news, stating "Many months have passed; half of my friends are in jail; the other half fled to other countries." when asked about the pressure he felt after his arrest. He was also charged under computer crime laws for Facebook messages he posted.

His group organized another event in March 2015, 'I Walk Therefore, I Am'. Nampa and another three defendants walked for 3 days from Bangbuathong to Patumwan police station to protest that civilians should not face military court. It was called a "landmark case" by the Human Rights Watch.

Nampa was arrested a second time in 2015 on the train traveling from Bangkok Noi to Rajabhakti Park, led by Siravich of the Democracy Studies Group. The campaign "Taking a train to Rajabhakti Park to throw light on graft techniques" was to look into alleged corruption during park construction. Army troops intercepted a train carrying student activists and disconnected their carriage from the train at Ban Pong Station, Ratchaburi. He and 37 other activists were taken to the National Office of Buddhism in Phutthamonthon park, and held until they were released later that night. He was detained in Bangkok Remand Prison on 25 April 2016, by the court prosecution of a military judge advocate, Col. Burin Thongprapai, the complainant, and was later released on bail. At the end of 2019, the court withdrew the accusation.

On 31 October 2015, he was charged under the Public Assembly Act for using an amplifier without permission during an event recognizing the death of Nuamthong Praiwan. He was fined 200 baht by Pol. Col Attawit Saisueb, Deputy Chief of Metropolitan Police Division One.

On 19 and 27 April 2016, he and the Resistant Citizen group invited people to stand, literally, at the Victory Monument to protest military harassment against activists. He and 15 other activists were arrested for a Protesting Act violation on both days. In 2019, the court fined him 1,000 baht.

Aside from his activism, he took on a lot of lèse-majesté cases that spiked in the year after the coup, such as the case of Pongsak Sriboonpeng, who was sentenced to 30 years in jail for posting insults to the monarchy. He was also a lawyer for Thanakorn Siripaiboon who was charged with infamous lèse-majesté related to the King's dog, 'Tongdaeng', and Siravich's mother, who was charged 15 years in prison for 'Ja' Facebook message reply. Thanet Anantawong, the Dao Din group, and Jatupat Boonpattararaksa were also his clients.

In late 2017, continuing to work as a human rights activist, he communicated human rights stories on his Facebook account and eventually criticized the court for punishing his particular group of clients by restricting them from seeing each other. He said that the court had no right to order that. On 5 December, he was charged with violating the Computer Crime Act and contempt of court by Lt. Col. Supharat Kam-in. He denied all charges and said that it was politically motivated against exercising rights to freedom of expression. Human rights NGOs demanded the military junta stop strategic litigation against public participation (SLAPP suits). Front Line Defenders condemned the military junta for judicial harassment; they strongly believed it was linked to his work as a human rights lawyer and demanded the junta drop all charges against him.

=== Demanding an election: 2018–2019 ===
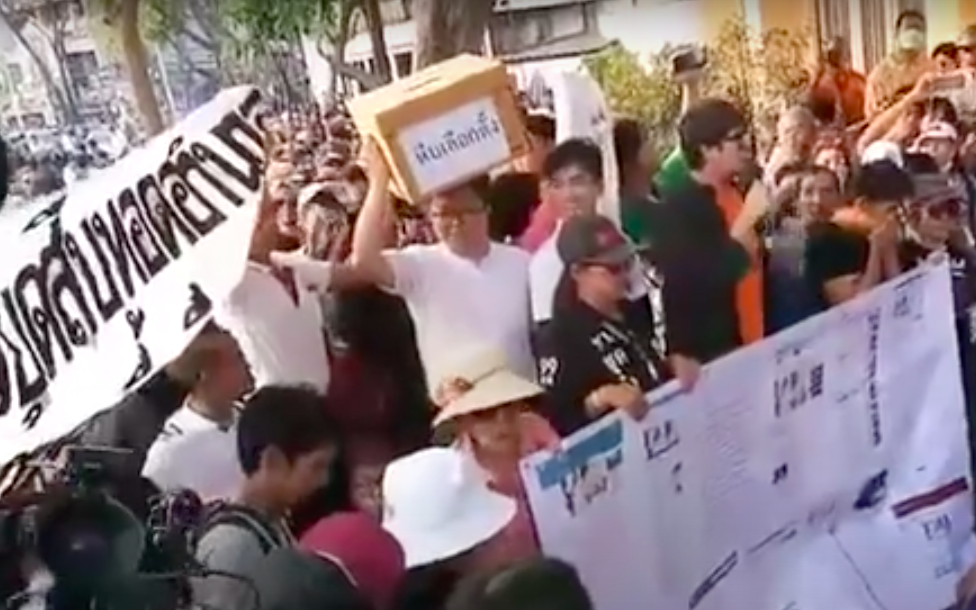
Arnon Nampa holding a mocking ballot box while Rome is giving a speech at 10 August 2018 protest

On 27 January 2018, a group of activists demanding a general election—Nampa, Sirawit Seritiwat, Nutta Mahattana, Rangsiman Rome, Netiwit Chotiphatphaisal, Ekachai Hongkangwan, and Sukrid Peansuwan—were charged with more than four acts of incitement against the state by the same person who charged him in 2015, Col. Burin Thongprapai.

On 10 February 2018, Nampa, Sirivich, and Rangsiman led 200–500 protesters at the Democracy Monument to demand a general election within the year 2018 and to criticize Prayut and Prawit Wongsuwan. The police charged him and six other individuals seen as the leaders with sedition. On 23 July 2019, the sedition charge was dropped.

He and other activists organized a political rally of people who wanted an election at the army headquarters and the UN building on 24 March and 22 May 2018. The authorities informed him of the sedition accusation. Later in October, he was charged again under the Computer Crime Act for sharing Rajaphakti's plan and "liking" a parody post about Tongdeang, the King's dog, on Facebook.

On 6 January 2019, he led a demonstration at the Victory Monument calling for a stop to the postponement of a general election. After the 2019 Thai general election ended, he protested every day for a week at the Office of Election Commission of Thailand which prosecuted critics of the counting process and confused initial results by just standing. Unofficial results, which typically would be known by the same night and announced the next morning, were repeatedly delayed for 44 days.

== Reforms to the monarchy: 2019–2020 ==
=== Prologue ===
On 30 September 2019, King Maha Vajiralongkorn ordered an emergency decree. As a result, two infantry regiments were removed from the Royal Thai Army's chain of command and placed under the Royal Security Command to consolidate his personal authority. All personnel, assets, and operating budgets were likewise transferred to the agency. On 14 October, Nampa posted an open letter to the House of Representatives on Facebook, urging them to open a discussion and vote against it. He explained it was contrary to Article 172 of the Constitution because it is not an urgent matter and it was an extension of the military power of the monarchy that would break the democratic system, as normally military power would be under the cabinet executive to be able to be checked and balanced by the National Assembly of Thailand and the Judiciary of Thailand. Later, an emergency decree passed, but 70 representatives from the Future Forward Party, which was later dissolved by the Constitutional Court led by Piyabutr Saengkanokkul, voted against it.

On 16 June 2020, after he was accused of a computer crime violation, he posted about the monarchy budget on Facebook. He filed a letter to Prayuth Chan-O-Cha, demanding an explanation and investigation of the monarchy budget, and urged him to distribute a fraction of it to the COVID-19 pandemic crisis.

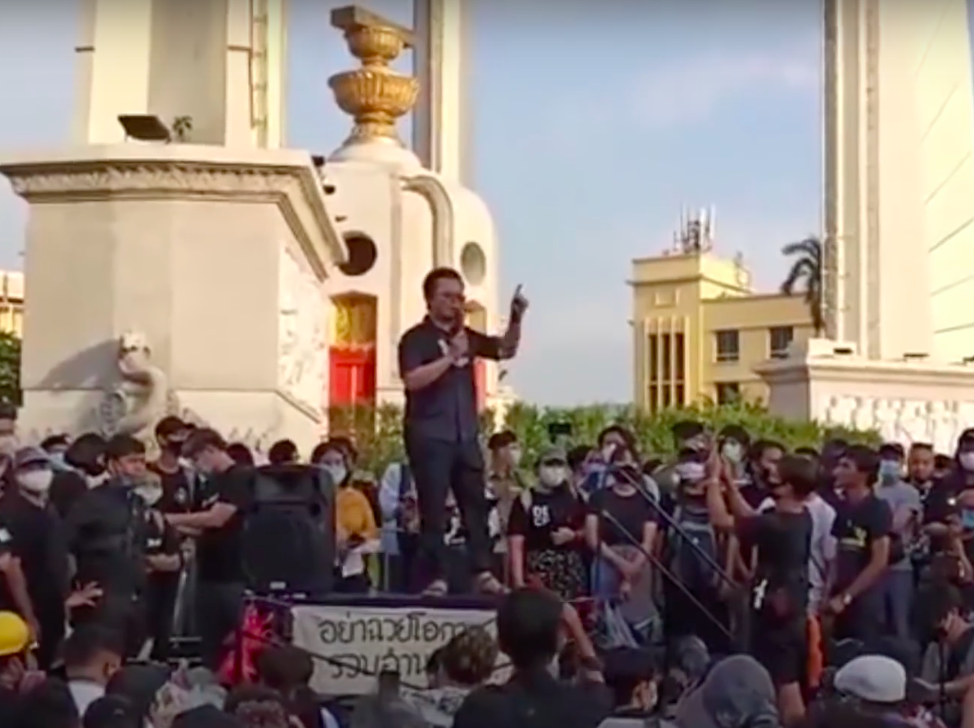
Arnon Nampa at 18 July 2020 protest

On 24 June, Nampa and the DRG organized a pre-dawn protest at the Democracy Monument and other locations across the country to commemorate the 1932 revolt that ended the absolute monarchy and started the democratic system. These events were "trending number one" on Twitter but later they were charged with several minor violations.

On 18 July, the student group Free Youth Movement organized a public demonstration that drew more than 2,000 protesters at the Democracy Monument. He reminded protesters to support prisoners convicted under the lèse-majesté law, as well as Tiwagorn Withiton, who had posted a picture of himself wearing the viral "I lost faith in the monarchy" t-shirt, and was forcibly admitted to a psychiatric hospital. He called for the dissolution of parliament because of an unfair election, the dissolution of the Future Forward Party, for officials to stop threatening citizens, and the drafting of a new constitution. Later on 20 July, he addressed the Royal Thai Army, demanded the army to stop harassing activists, repeal the junta senate, and stop a coup amnesty.

=== Breaking the taboo ===
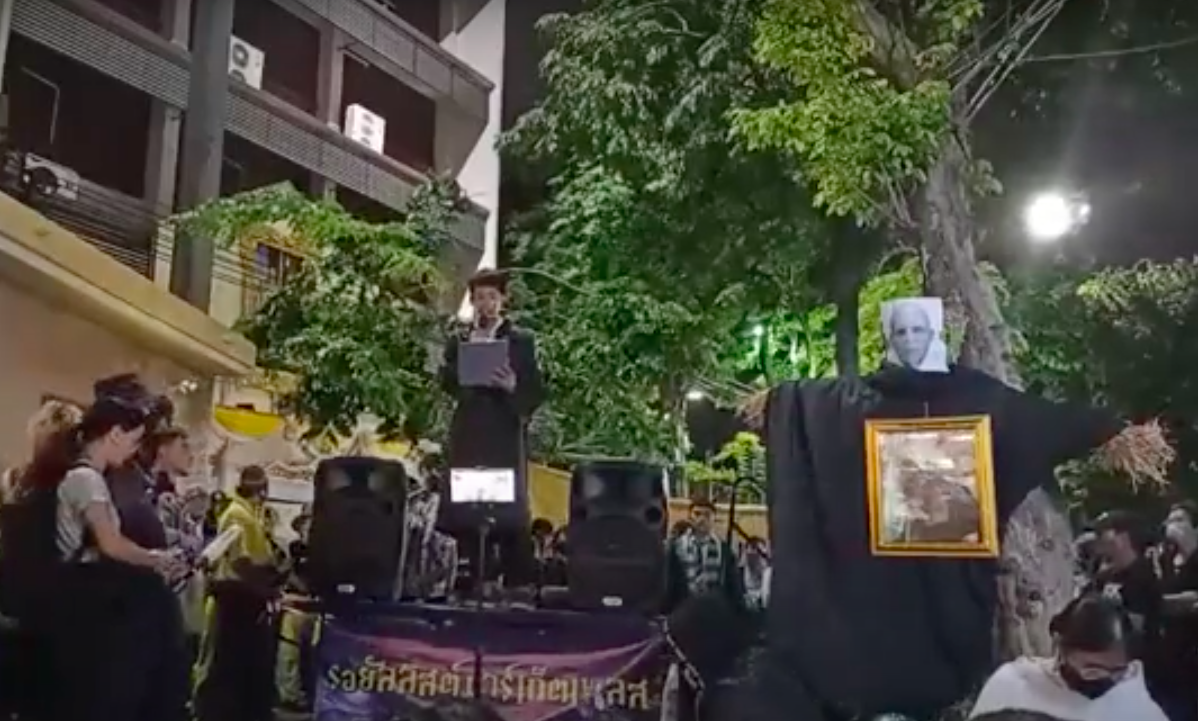
Harry Potter-themed protest on 4 August 2020, kickoff the reforms to the monarchy

In mid-2020, despite openly criticizing the monarchy and protesting on social media, such as in the Tiwagorn case, no one had tried public speaking. Eventually, on 3 August 2020, Arnon Nampa openly criticized the monarchy in front of 200 protesters dressed as wizards for a Harry Potter-themed protest at the Democracy Monument. It was regarded as the first time in Thai history that the monarchy's powers were curbed in an unusually frank public speech. Only Somsak Jeamteerasakul had done it, but in closed academic seminars and public articles. Another case is Daranee Charnchoengsilpakul's comments against the monarchy during a speech at the United Front for Democracy Against Dictatorship political rally during the 2008 Thai political crisis.

He stressed that he wanted to reform the constitutional monarchy, not overthrow it, and focused on the asset transfer from the Crown Property Bureau to the personal belongings of the King. He also questioned the King's decision to transfer two military units to his command, which was not a democratic, constitutional monarchy. He accused King Maha Vajiralongkorn of creating unprecedented changes in the constitution. He told the media that he spoke candidly, to honor his integrity, the integrity of the audience, and out of respect for the monarchy.

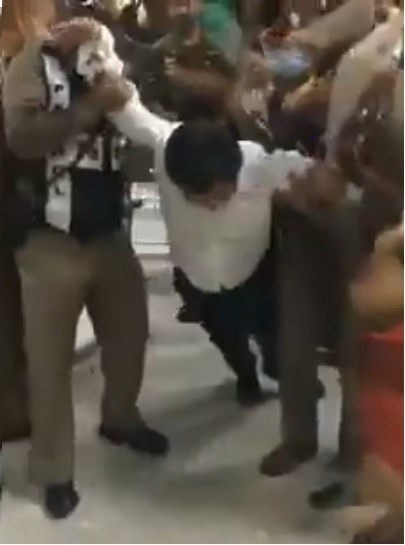
Arnon being dragged by officers upon his first arrest

On 5 August, Apiwat Kanthong, the lawyer of Prayuth Chan-O-Cha, filed a complaint for the crime of lèse-majesté, removing Nampa as a member of the Lawyers Council. On 7 August, the Samranrat Police arrested him and Panupong Jadnok with sedition after the 18 July Free Youth protest. Later that day, Nampa and Panupong were dragged by police officers from the Criminal Court to a police vehicle and taken to the Huai Khwang Police Station. He and Jadnok were released on bail on the evening of 8 August by a Criminal Court order. On the next day, he continued speaking out again at the Chiang Mai protest.

He said in an interview later that the students wanted to do this before, but they asked him to start the movement. Some media deleted live streaming of his speech.

=== Revolutionary rally ===
A week after the historic speech from Nampa, on 10 August 2020, there was a revolutionary rally at Thammasat University, regarding the Rangsit campus in Pathum Thani Province named "ธรรมศาสตร์จะไม่ทน" (lit. Thammasat will not tolerate.). Parit Chiwarak wrote the revolutionary 10 monarchy reform manifestos, adapted from Somsak Jeamteerasakul, and let Panusaya Sithijirawattanakul read them out without fear of abduction and murder. In front of more than 1,000 protesters, Nampa again spoke out about monarchy reform.

Despite the protests demanding monarchy reform, 7 days later, the biggest anti-government protest on 17 August by the Free Youth Group was different. They demanded that the government resign, dissolve the parliament, and hold a new general election under a revised constitution. Drawing more than 20,000 people at the Democracy Monument, Nampa said that "the biggest dream of seeing the monarchy stay alongside Thai society", rather than unattached above it.

He was arrested again on 19 August for sedition, the Assembly Act, and the Computer Crime Act for a Harry Potter-themed speech. He spent a night at Chanasongkram Police Station and was released on bail in the morning. The police searched his house seeking illegal evidence but found nothing. On 25 August, he was arrested again for sedition over his speech on 10 August and was released on bail. Later, on 1 September, he reported that the state official harassed him by visiting his grandmother's house.

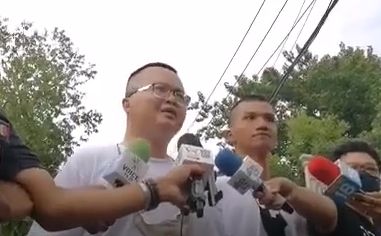
Nampa and Panupong were released on bail, 7 September 2020

On 3 September 2020, the court revoked the bail appeals of Arnon Nampa and Panupong Jadnok, and they were remanded until further notice. The court ruled that both of them had breached their bail terms by taking part in protests. Nampa was immediately re-detained, and the court justified this on the theory that "in order to prevent the offender from causing other harm". After being detained for 5 days, on 7 September, the police withdrew the request. He and Panupong were released. The Clooney Foundation for Justice called it an unlawful bail condition.

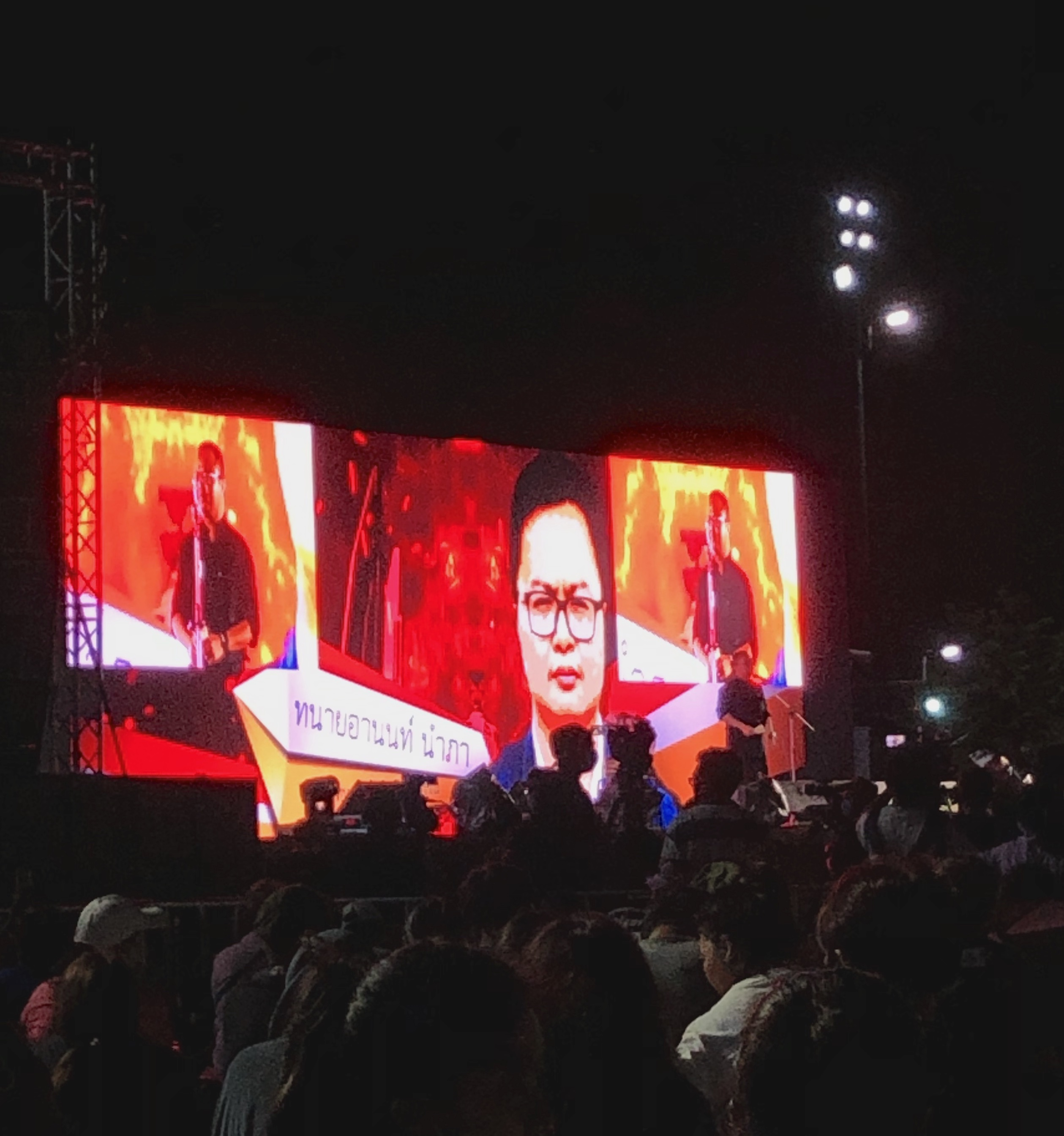
Arnon Nampa at 19 September 2020 protest

Eventually, Nampa, Panupong, Panusaya, Parit, and prominent activists such as Pai Dao Din, organized a 19–20 September protest in front of the Grand Palace's Sanam Luang drawing around 18,000–50,000 protesters. The main goal of the 2020-2021 Thai protests was to curb the palace's powers. He repeated his monarchy reform goal: "Unless the monarchy is under the constitution, we will never achieve true democracy," and "the country belongs to the people, not the monarchy.". The leaders placed a commemorative brass plaque, 'the second Khana Ratsadon plaque', to remind them of the 1932 revolution that ended absolute monarchy. They have been called 'Ratsadon' by media.

=== Ratsadon ===
On 14 October, the 47th anniversary of a major student-led 1973 Thai popular uprising, Nampa and other Ratsadon leaders organized a marching protest to the Government House, drawing around 8,000 protesters. It was planned as a general strike. He led a group on a truck to the Democracy Monument. The next morning, on 15 October, he was forcibly taken by a special commando unit without a lawyer to the Chiang Mai Police Station, facing sedition charges by Apiwat Kanthong, Prayuth Chan-O-Cha's lawyer, complaining to Pol. Col. Phuwanat Duangdee for a speech on stage about the monarchy in Chiang Mai and Pathum Thani.

On 16 October, he wrote on plain paper to the court that the judicial process, order, and judging are unfair. He had believed in Thai judicial systems before, so he decided to study law. But in his experiences, he found that a judicial process is part of a dictatorship. He believes that someday the court will rethink it and get back to standing with Thai society. The protest escalated on 16 October when the police fired a water cannon at a large crowd at the Pathumwan intersection.

He had been detained at Chiang Mai Central Prison until 27 October; he was released on 200,000 baht bail, but Pol Lt Col Chok-amnuay Wongboonrit, Chana Songkhram police, arrested him straight away for sedition and ruining archaeological sites in the '19–20 September protest'. He was then taken to the Bangkok Remand Prison. In the evening, the Criminal Court denied bail for him on the grounds that he might cause unrest.

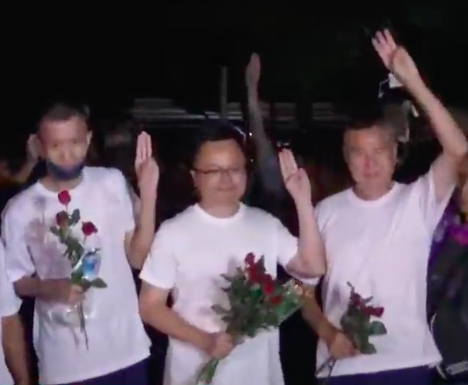
Ekachai Hongkangwan, Arnon Nampa, and Somyot Prueksakasemsuk got bail on 2 November 2020

After being in prison for 19 days, he was released on 2 November at midnight along with political activists Somyot Prueksakasemsuk, and Ekkachai Hongkangwan, making his jail time total 24 days that year without the court verdict.

On 17 November, Nampa and Rasadon led protesters to the Sappaya-Sapasathan parliament to pressure the parliament to accept the constitution amendment bill sponsored by civil group iLaw. The police used the water cannon to fire a tear gas liquid, causing many protesters to be injured. At the end, the police ran back and let the mass gather in front of the parliament. Nampa called on demonstrators to gather at Ratchaprasong Intersection on 18 November and said to fight face-to-face with the monarchy. That day, the protesters sprayed paint around the police headquarters, insulting the monarchy.

=== Lèse-majesté strikes ===
On 19 November, Prayuth Chan-o-cha promised to use 'all laws' against the protesters, including lèse-majesté law, or Article 112, but the protests had taken place almost every day from October to November. Nampa also received a summons for lèse-majesté in addition to other charges. The Clooney Foundation for Justice Initiative called on the Thai government to dismiss these charges against him and others to stop sanctions on free speech and peaceful assembly.

Nampa and Ratsadon led protesters to protest at the SCB banking company owned by Vajiralongkorn on 25 November and at the Bangkok army barracks on 29 November. All venues were related to reforms to the monarchy. On 3 December, he addressed the king directly in a speech, saying that the monarchy must be "politically neutral" to retain the reverence afforded to it by Article 6 of the constitution. He stated that he would take a break during the New Year's holidays and would continue the rally in 2021 with more escalation.

On 14 January 2021, Arnon Nampa was recognized by South Korea's May 18 Memorial Foundation for winning the 2021 Gwangju Prize for Human Rights for his human rights legal contribution, anti-authoritarian activism, and his call for the monarchy reform. He is the third person from Thailand after Angkhana Neelaphaijit and Pai Dao Din to receive this award.

== Imprisonment without trial: 2021–2022 ==
=== Bangkok Remand Prison: February–June 2021 ===
On 9 February 2021, Nampa and members of the Ratsadon group, Parit, Patipan Luecha, and Somyot, were arrested and detained again on charges of lèse-majesté and 10 other offenses, including sedition, over a 19–20 September protest by Pol Lt Col Chok-amnuay Wongboonrit and Chana Songkhram police. The court denied them bail and remanded them in the Bangkok Remand Prison. US National Security Advisor Jake Sullivan expressed concern. United Nations human rights experts condemned the rising lèse-majesté cases. After the Court of Appeal rejected a request and cited their disrespect for the monarchy, they posed a flight risk. In front of Bangkok Remand Prison, Prachak Kongkirati, Yukti Mukdawichit, Boonlert Wisetpreecha from Thammasat University, and Puangthong Pawakrapan from Chulalongkorn University, claiming to represent 255 lecturers at 31 universities and education institutions, read out a statement calling for their release. Human Rights Watch said that the country may return to the "dark days" by abusing the law and demanded the Thai government conform with Thailand's international human rights law obligations.

Nampa's lawyers tried to appeal on many occasions, but all were denied for the same reason by the court. By this time, he was jailed, awaiting trial. He was prosecuted in 21 cases, 11 of them lèse-majesté cases.

On 15 March, Nampa wrote a petition to the Criminal Court that spoke of his fear of the procedure of night time COVID-19 testing done on himself and other prisoners. Prison officials tried four times to take Jatupat and Panupong out to test COVID-19 at night, which was an unusual time. Nampa found it suspicious, as he said there had been rumours circulating that they would be injured or killed in prison.

On 8 April, Nampa, Jatupat, and Somyot signed a letter expressing their intention to withdraw their lawyer from the trial because he cited a lack of due fairness in the court and was therefore no longer required to defend them. While Patipan was released on bail, Parit and Panusaya had committed to a hunger strike until he got bail.

Nampa was infected with COVID-19 in custody and sent to the prison hospital on 6 May.

110 days after being detained without a court verdict, on 6 June, he was given bail of 200,000 baht on conditions that included refraining from defaming the monarchy and inciting non-peaceful events along with Panupong. He was immediately treated in hospital for symptoms of COVID-19.

He resumed his activism at a June event by reading 'Prakat Khana Ratsadon', a declaration on the Siamese revolution of 1932.

=== Bangkok Remand Prison: August 2021–February 2022 ===
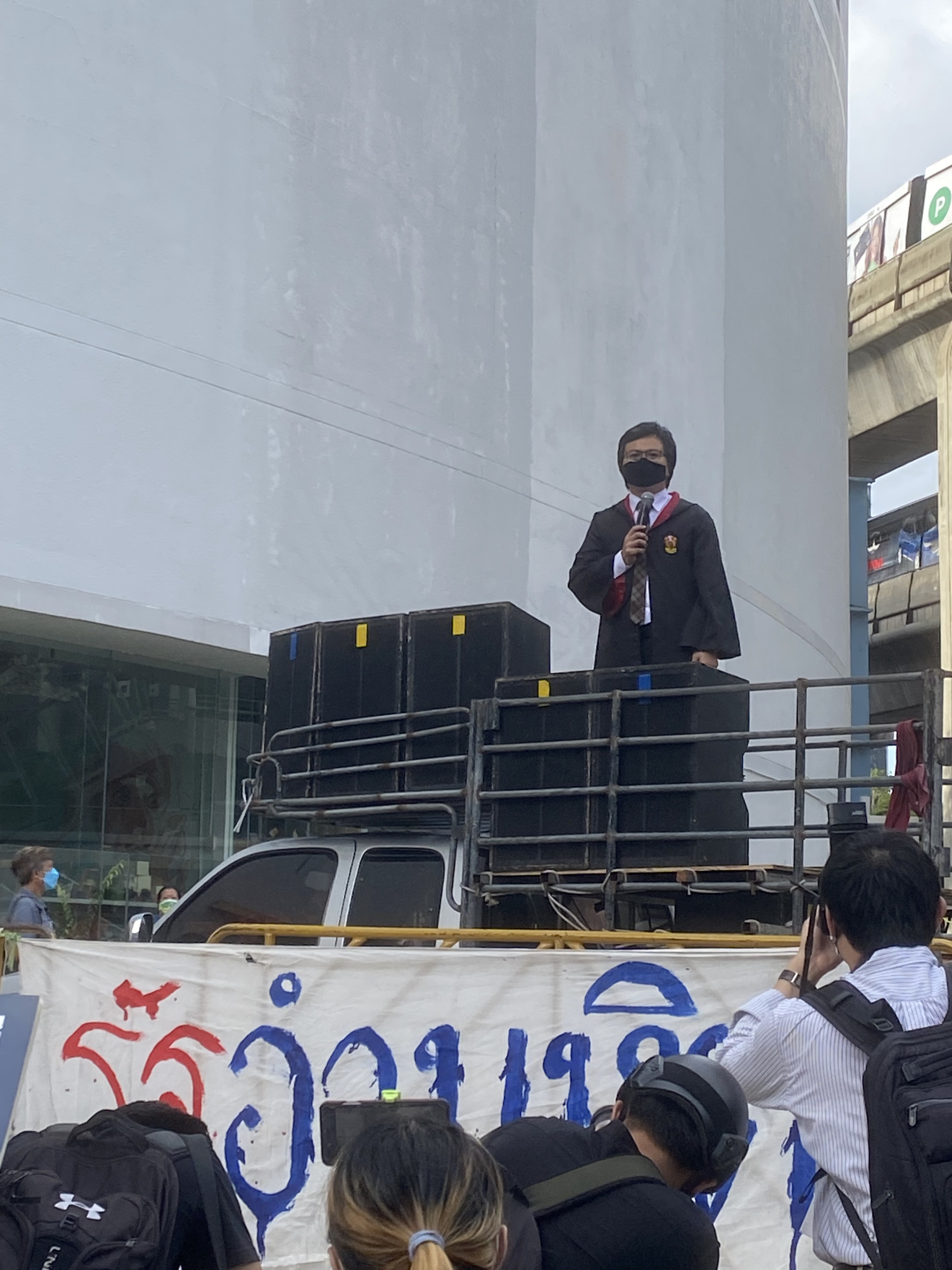
Arnon Nampa at a Harry Potter themed protest on 3 August 2021

On 3 August, Arnon Nampa gave a critical speech once again in front of the Bangkok Art and Culture Centre to commemorate the 'Harry Potter themed' event the previous year. This time he demanded a revoke of Article 112 and the transfer of public assets from the King back to their previous status. He was imprisoned on 9 August for lèse-majesté charges.

On 10 November 2020, the Constitutional Court ruled that Nampa's speech, calling for reforms of the monarchy in the 'Thammasat will not tolerate' rally on 10 August 2020, aimed to overthrow the state and the monarchy. The court ordered him and other protest groups to end all monarchy reform movements.

On 28 February 2022, Nampa received bail from all courts after he had been detained for 203 days. His total imprisonment time between 2020 and 2022 was 337 days.

== Personality and personal life ==
Born in a rice field, he often recalled a natural and rural feeling of a rice field and agriculture. His Facebook profile photo was Chit Phumisak.

== Poetry and artworks ==
In 2011, he wrote a poetry collection book, Mute and Blind, at the End of the Line, about the 2010 red shirts massacre. His book was nominated for the S.E.A. Write Award in 2013.

He performed Khlui (the Thai Flute) in a Thai activist band Faiyen's 'Farmer' song. Khlui was his instrument during his student activism.

== Awards and honors ==
- Jarupong Thongsin for Democracy Award, Thailand (2020)
- Gwangju Prize for Human Rights, Korea (2021)

== See also ==
- Lèse-majesté in Thailand
- Human rights in Thailand
- 2020–2021 Thai protests
- Panusaya Sithijirawattanakul
- Milk Tea Alliance
