= Kim Jun-tae =

Kim Jun-tae (Korean: 김준태) may refer to:

- Kim Jun Tae (born 1948), South Korean poet
- Kim Jun-tae (footballer) (born 1985), South Korean footballer
- Kim Joon-tae, South Korean taekwondo practitioner
- Kim Jun Tae (billiards player), South Korean player of three-cushion billiards
