= Jung-hyun =

- Hangul: 정현
- RR: Jeonghyeon
- MR: Chŏnghyŏn

Jung-hyun, also spelled Jeong-hyeon, is a Korean given name.

People with this name include:

== Entertainers ==
- Yoo Jung-hyun (born 1967), South Korean television personality and politician
- Kim Jung-hyun (actor, born 1976), South Korean actor
- Lena Park (born Park Jung-hyun, 1976), American singer
- Lee Jung-hyun (born 1980), South Korean singer
- Lim Jeong-hyun (born 1983), South Korean guitarist
- Kim Jung-hyun (actor, born 1990), South Korean actor
- Xiyeon (born Park Jung-hyun, 2000), South Korean actress

== Sportspeople ==
- Cho Jung-hyun (born 1969), South Korean football player
- Song Jung-hyun (born 1976), South Korean football player
- Wang Jung-hyun (born 1976), South Korean football player
- Lee Jung-hyun (basketball, born 1987), South Korean basketball player
- Lee Jung-hyun (basketball, born 1999), South Korean basketball player
- Yim Jung-hyun (born 1987), South Korean racewalker
- Chu Jung-hyun (born 1988), South Korean football player
- Son Jeong-hyeon (born 1991), South Korean football player
- Kim Jeong-hyun (footballer), South Korean football player

== Other ==
- Nam Jung-hyun (born 1933), South Korean writer
- Mun Jeong-hyeon (born c. 1941), South Korean Catholic priest and democracy activist
- Lee Jung-hyun (politician) (born 1958), South Korean politician

== See also ==
- Shin Joong-hyun (신중현, born 1938), South Korean guitarist
- Kwon Jung-hyun (cyclist) (권중현, born 1942), South Korean cyclist
- Jung Hyun (born 1994), South Korean baseball player
- Chung Hyeon (born 1996), South Korean tennis player
- List of Korean given names
