= Kim Jeong-hyeon =

- Hangul: 김정현
- RR: Gim Jeonghyeon
- MR: Kim Chŏnghyŏn

Kim Jeong-hyeon, also spelled Kim Jung-hyun, (Korean: 김정현) is a Korean name consisting of the family name Kim and the given name Jeong-hyeon, also spelled Jung-hyun.

People with the name:

- Kim Jung-hyun (actor, born 1976), South Korean actor
- Kim Jeong-hyun (footballer, born 1988), South Korean footballer
- Kim Jung-hyun (footballer, born 1990), South Korean footballer
- Kim Jeong-hyun (footballer, born 1993), South Korean footballer
- Kim Jung-hyun (actor, born 1990), South Korean actor

== See also ==
- Kim Jong-hyun (disambiguation)
