= Dandeniya =

Dandeniya is a given name. Notable people with the name include:

- Dandeniya Gamage Jayanthi, Sri Lankan political activist
- Dandeniya Hemachandra de Silva (1932–2014), Sri Lankan cricketer
