= Kim Jong-hyun (disambiguation) =

Kim Jong-hyun (1990–2017) was a South Korean singer and member of Shinee.

Kim Jong-hyun may also refer to:

- Kim Jong-hyun (sport shooter) (born 1985), South Korean sport shooter
- Kim Jong-hyun (footballer) (born 1973), South Korean footballer
- Kim Jong-hyeon (born 1995) (formerly JR), a South Korean singer and former member of NU'EST

== See also ==
- Kim Jeong-hyeon (disambiguation)
- Kim Jong Un (disambiguation)
