= Kim Jong Un (disambiguation) =

- Hangul: 김종운
- Revised Romanization: Gim Jongun
- McCune–Reischauer: Kim Chongun
- IPA: [kim.dʑoŋ.un]
- Hangul: 김정은
- Revised Romanization: Gim Jeongeun
- McCune–Reischauer: Kim Chŏngŭn
- IPA: [kim.dʑʌŋ.ɯn]
- Hangul: 김정운
- Revised Romanization: Gim Jeongun
- McCune–Reischauer: Kim Chŏngun
- IPA: [kim.dʑʌŋ.un]

Kim Jong Un is the current General Secretary of the Workers' Party of Korea, serving as the 3rd Supreme Leader of North Korea.

Kim Jong Un may also refer to:

- Kim Jung-eun (born 1974), South Korean actress, legal name 김정은
- Kim Ji-woo (born 1983), South Korean actress, legal name 김정은
- Yesung (born 1984), South Korean singer and actor, born 김종운
- Kim Jong-eun (born 1986), South Korean field hockey player, legal name 김종은
- Kim Jung-eun (basketball) (born 1987), South Korean basketball player, legal name 김정은
- Kim Lip (born 1999), South Korean singer, legal name 김정은
- Howard X, an Australian-Hong Kong Chinese impersonator.
