= Kim Jun Tae =

South Korean poet

Kim Jun Tae (Korean: 김준태, born 1948) is a South Korean poet. His poetry generally unfolds in hometowns and rural villages and is an ode to the vitality of nature and the revolutionary power of the people. He became famous for his poem, "Aa gwangjuyeo, urinaraui sipjagayeo" (아아 광주여, 우리나라의 십자가여 Gwangju, Cross of Our Nation) which testified to the horrors of the May 18 Gwangju Democratization Movement. It was published on the front page of the daily regional newspaper and was later translated into both English and Japanese. He is the deputy director of the National Literature Authors Association and the director of the May 18 Memorial Foundation.

== Life ==
Kim Jun Tae was born in 1948 in Haenam County, South Jeolla Province, South Korea. In 1968, he entered the College of Education at Chosun University and, in 1969, he won the Jeonnam Ilbo and Jeonnam Daily News New Writer's Contest (전남일보‧전남매일 신춘문예). In November of the same year, he published "Sijageul geureoke hamyeon doena" (시작(詩作)을 그렇게 하면 되나 Is That How We Compose Poems?), "Amerika" (아메리카 America), and five other poems in the professional poetry magazine Siin and became known in literary circles.

After he graduated from college, he became a high school teacher in 1980—the same year the Gwangju Democratization Movement broke out. He wrote the poem "Aa gwangjuyeo, urinaraui sipjagayeo" on the subject of the horrors of the May 18 Gwangju Democratization Movement and it was published on the front page of the June 2nd issue of the Jeonnam Daily News. After its publication, "Aa gwangjuyeo, urinaraui sipjagayeo" was translated into English, Chinese, Japanese, and other languages. Kim Jun Tae was soon arrested and tortured in prison after the publication of this poem, finally released after one month. However, he was unable to keep his job as a teacher. After he was fired from his teaching job, he started to work at Jeonnam Daily News—the same newspaper that originally published his poem. He continued to write poetry even with his regular job at the newspaper and published poetry collections such as the 1981 Naneun haneunimeul boatda (나는 하느님을 보았다 I Saw God) and the 1984 Gukbapgwa himang (국밥과 희망 Rice Soup and Hope). His 1989 poetry collection, Oworeseo tongillo (오월에서 통일로 From May Towards Reunification), in which he places his poetry alongside panhwa—prints and engravings that were popular and effective mediums for spreading propaganda at the time—particularly demonstrates Kim's literary intentions and tenets . He also traveled throughout Europe, the United States, China, Central Asia, and Southeast Asia during this time period, simultaneously giving lectures on literature while traveling. In 1983, he received the Gwangju Literature Award (광주문학상) and in 1985, he received the Hyeonsan Literary Award (현산문학상).

Even after the removal of the military dictatorship and the establishment of a democratic government in the 1990s, Kim continued to write prolifically. He continued to publish original poetry collections such as the 1991 Tongireul kkumkkuneun seulpeun saekjuga (통일을 꿈꾸는 슬픈 색주가 The Sad Barmaid That Dreams of Reunification), the 1994 Kkochi ije jisanggwa haneureul (꽃이, 이제 지상과 하늘을 The Flowers Now in the Ground and the Sky), and the 1999 Jipyeongseone seoseo (지평선에 서서 Standing on the Horizon). During this time period, Kim Jun Tae expanded his literary activities to encompass broader areas. With the May 18 Gwangju Democratization Movement as a central motif, he wrote the story for a pansori in 1922, titled "Mudeungjinhongok" (무등진혼곡 Matchless Requiem). He also participated in numerous performances that commemorated the May 18 Movement, such as writing the screenplay for a 1999 opera, "Mudeungdungdung" (무등둥둥 Matchless Drum Beats). He made his official debut as a novelist with the publication of his novella "Oreupeuseuneun jukji anatda" (오르페우스는 죽지 않았다 Orpheus Did Not Die) in the literary journal Munye Joongang. He also won the Inaugural Illustrious Poet Award (제1회 자랑스런 시인상) in 1999. He was active for a long time in the Korean Writers Association, a group established by progressive writers, and was its deputy director for a period of time. In 2003, he was the vice chairman of the Korean Literature and Peace Forum and from 2011 to 2013, he was the chairman of the May 18 Memorial Foundation.

== Writing ==
=== Love for Farms and Farmers ===
Kim Jun Tae's 1969 poem, "Chamkkaereul teolmyeonseo" (참깨를 털면서 Brushing Off Sesame Seeds) is the work that made him recognized as a poet and became widely known as one of his most representative works. In this poem, Kim Jun Tae surrenders himself to the providence of nature and focuses on the realities of workers. While tracing the daily life of a farming village as they farm and harvest the fruits of their labor, Kim extols the vitality of nature for making everything possible. Yet equally important is that this poem does not merely praise life in farming villages, but also goes on to criticize the inhumanity of city life. The narrator of "Chamkkaereul teolmyeonseo," after having lived in the city for nearly ten years, brushes off sesame seeds and feels "a pleasure that is difficult to experience in the realm of worldly affairs." This is because the sight of sesame seeds, continuously raining down as they are being brushed off and separated from the chaff, is an experience diametrically opposed to hectic and cramped city life. Yet the poem's narrator, thinking that "How many things exist like the sesame plant where, struck anywhere, sesame seeds will pour out," soon strikes the sesame plant too roughly and receives a scolding from a grandmother. This is because when one is brushing off sesame seeds from the sesame plant itself, one has to be careful to "make sure none of the seeds are lost." Even in the smallest of seeds there is life—something that farmers never forget during their harvests. In this manner, Kim Jun Tae's poetry is constructed upon a foundation of love for farmers and farming villages.

=== Critique of Society Through Poetry ===
Through the brutal massacre of civilians in the May 18 Gwangju Democratization Movement in 1980, Kim Jun Tae's poetry turned towards an even more radical criticism of reality. Reflecting back to the time when he wrote "Aa gwangjuyeo," Kim has stated that he himself did not write this poem; rather, it seemed like the numerous victims that died during the Gwangju Uprising were the poem's true authors. In the same way that this poem contributed to alerting the entire world about the horrors of the Gwangju Massacre, beginning in the 1980s, Kim oriented his poetry towards manifesting the political capabilities of the people in poetic form. In other words, it was his experience of the May 18 Democratization Movement in Gwangju that allowed Kim Jun Tae to expand his poetic world. Seen in this context, his 1989 poetry collection Oworeseo tongillo becomes particularly important. By arranging the poems in this collection alongside panhwa engravings and prints, the poems' images are more clearly defined in the reader's eyes. These prints were comparatively simple to manufacture and easily mass-produced, thus making them an effective propaganda material for people seeking to resist the oppression of the military regime at the time. In Oworeseo tongillo, Kim Jun Tae thus demonstrated the possibilities of resistance that the medium of panhwa embodied together with his own poetic orientation. The word tongil (reunification) in the collection's title also deserves particular attention. That is, the legacy left by the May 18 Gwangju Democratization Movement must be re-evaluated and seen in broader terms than merely opposing a totalitarian regime. Kim Jun Tae's poetry criticizes the oppression and violence caused by the state while also seeking a universal set of values, seen in the desire for national unification between North and South Korea. In the 1990s, after the dissolution of the totalitarian regime, Kim Jun Tae's poetry shifted towards paeans and imaginings of reunification on the Korean peninsula. As demonstrated by Oworeseo tongillo, his poetry expanded the meaning of the May 18 Gwangju Democratization Movement and is the product of literary praxis.

=== God and Nature, The Origins of Kim Jun Tae's Poetry ===
The word that consistently threads Kim Jun Tae's poetry is "bat" (field). Even after his experience of the May 18 Movement and his poetry started to focus on criticizing reality, he never lost his imagination regarding fields. While the field is a space of production, it is also a space whose returns are commensurate with the labor humans have invested in it. Unlike the other complicated social and economic places where humans suppress other humans, the field is a space ruled by nature's providence. Kim has continuously concentrated on this aspect in his poetry, using the term "field poetry" as a subtitle to his 1989 poetry collection Kalgwa heuk (칼과 흙 Knife and Soil) and his 1999 collection Jipyeongseone seoseo. With a steadfast belief in the vitality and life force of the soil and fields, Kim has emphasized that "the soil is stronger than the knife" in his poetry. In his 2014 poem, "Batsi" (밭시 Poem of the Fields), he confessed that "the path to finding himself" is continuously on the earth and the soil. Even as farming societies collapse and cities continuously expand, he believes that humanity can always find hope within the fields and soil. The providence of nature, as symbolized by the "fields" in his poetry, combines with his imaginings of God. In fact, the original title for his famous poem, "Aa gwangjuyeo," was "Aa gwangjuyeo, urinaraui sipjagayeo" (아아 광주여, 우리나라의 십자가여 Gwangju, the Cross of Our Nation). Kim has stated that when he was writing this poem, he remembers feeling that God was looking down upon him. He has also asserted in other spaces that the deceased victims of the Gwangju Massacre were the ones that truly wrote this poem. In this sense, for Kim, the victims of the Gwangju Massacre were another manifestation of God. Through his 1981 poetry collection, Naneun haneunimeul boatda, he further emphasizes this notion that he sees "God" in the victims of the Gwangju Democratization Movement.

For Kim, God is a "being abundant with love and peace." Thus, the fact that he saw "love" within the horrors of Gwangju is seen as completely natural. In his 1984 poem, "Geumnam-ro sarang" (금남로 사랑 Love for Geumnam Street), he affirms that "Geumnam Street is love" and in reflecting upon the brave people that refused to surrender to harsh oppression, he simultaneously imagines farmers plowing the fields and planting trees. In this manner, he evokes Gwangju and Geumnam Street as a place where "love" blossoms, as well as a place of "forgiveness" and "peace." Kim Jun Tae's poetry ultimately underscores an ethical demeanor in which, in the same way nature embraces humanity, humans, too, can embrace historical tragedies and overcome them.

== Works ==
=== Poetry collections ===
《참깨를 털면서》, 창작과비평사, 1977. / Chamkkaereul teolmyeonseo (Brushing Off Sesame Seeds), Changbi, 1977.

《나는 하느님을 보았다》, 한마당, 1981. / Naneun haneunimeul boatda (I Saw God), Hanmadang, 1981.

《국밥과 희망》, 풀빛,1984. / Gukbapgwa himang (Rice Soup and Hope), Pulbit, 1984.

《넋통일》, 전예원, 1986. / Neoktongil (Unification of the Soul), Jeonyewon, 1986.

《불이냐 꽃이냐》, 청사, 1986. / Burinya kkochinya (Fire or Flower?), Cheongsa, 1986.

《아아 광주여 영원한 청춘의 도시여》, 실천문학사, 1988. / Aa gwangjuyeo yeongwonhan cheongchunui dosiyeo (O Gwangju! The City of Our Eternal Youth), Silcheon, 1988.

《오월에서 통일로》, 광주, 1989. / Oworeseo tongillo (From May Towards Reunification), Gwangju, 1989.

《칼과 흙》, 문학과지성사, 1989. / Kalgwa heuk (Knife and Soil), Moonji, 1989.

《통일을 꿈꾸는 슬픈 색주가》, 미래사, 1991. / Tongireul kkumkkuneun seulpeun saekjuga (The Sad Barmaid That Dreams of Reunification), Miraesa, 1991.

《저 혼자 퍼덕이는 마음은》, 북토피아, 1994. / Jeo honja peodeogineun maeumeun (That Lonely, Beating Heart), Buktopia, 1994.

《꽃이 이제 지상과 하늘을》, 창작과비평사, 1994. / Kkochi ije jisanggwa haneureul (The Flowers Now in the Ground and the Sky), Changbi, 1994.

《지평선에 서서》, 문학과지성사, 1999. / Jipyeongseone seoseo (Standing on the Horizon), Moonji, 1999.

《한 손에 붓을 잡고 한 손에 잔을 들고》, 이화문화출판사, 2000. / Han sone buseul japgo han sone janeul deulgo (A Brush in One Hand, A Cup in the Other), Ewha Womans University Press, 2000.

《백두산아 훨훨 날아라》, 글누림, 2007. / Baekdusana hwolhwol narara (Fly, Fly from Baekdu Mountain), Geulnurim, 2007.

《님이여, 우리들 모두가 하나되게 하소서》, 화남출판사, 2009. / Nimiyeo, urideul moduga hanadoege hasoseo (Lord, Let Us All Be One), Hwanam, 2009.

《나는 왜 여기에 서 있지》, 책열린시, 2010. / Naneun wae yeogie seo itji (Why Am I Here?), Open Books, 2010.

《형제》, 지식을만드는지식, 2012. / Hyeongje (Sibling), Jisigeul mandeuneun jisik, 2012.

《달팽이 뿔》, 푸른사상, 2014. / Dalpaengi ppul (The Horns of a Snail), Pureun sasang, 2014.

《쌍둥이 할아버지의 노래》, 도서출판b, 2018. / Ssangdungi harabeojiui norae (The Song of the Twin Grandfathers), b-books, 2018.

《밭시, 강낭콩》, 모악, 2018. / Batsi, gangnangkong (Poem of the Fields, Kidney Beans), Moak, 2018.

《도보다리에서 울다 웃다》, 작가, 2018. / Dobodarieseo ulda utda (Crying, Laughing from the Pedestrian Bridge), Jakga, 2018.

=== Critical Essays ===
《시인은 독수리처럼》, 한마당, 1986. / Siineun doksuricheoreom (The Poet as an Eagle), Hanmadang, 1986.

《5월과 문학》, 남풍, 1988. / 5wolgwa munhak (May and Literature), Nampung, 1988.

=== Essay Collections ===
《달이 뜨면 고향에 가겠네》, 인동, 1991. / Dari tteumyeon gohyange gagenne (You Must Be Going Back to Your Hometown When the Moon Rises), Indong, 1991.

《슬픈 시인의 여행》, 한양출판, 1995. / Seulpeun siinui yeohaeng (The Sad Poet's Journey), Hanyang University Press, 1995.

《인간의 길을 묻고 싶다》, 모아드림, 1999. / Inganui gireul mutgo sipda (I Want to Ask for the Way of Humanity), Moadeurim, 1999.

《사랑의 확인-김준태의 한국 세계 명시여행 1》, 한마당, 1999. / Sarangui hwagin-Kim Jun Taeui hanguk segye myeongsiyeohaeng 1 (Love's Confirmation: Kim Jun Tae's Journey of Enlightenment Through Korea 1), Hanmadang, 1999.

《사랑의 변주-김준태의 한국 세계 명시여행 2》, 한마당, 1999. / Sarangui byeonju-gimjuntaeui hanguk segye myeongsiyeohaeng 2 (Love's Variations: Kim Jun Tae's Journey of Enlightenment Through Korea 2), Hanmadang, 1999.

《김준태 시인 세계문학의 거장을 만나다》, 한얼미디어, 2006. / Kim Jun Tae siin segyemunhagui geojangeul mannada (Poet Kim Jun Tae Meets the Masters of World Literature), Haneolmidieo, 2006.

《백두산아 훨훨 날아라》, 글누림, 2007. / Baekdusana hwolhwol narara (Fly, Fly From Baekdu Mountain), Geulnurim, 2007.

《재소고려인의 노래를 찾아서》 상‧하, 화남, 2007. / Jaesogoryeoinui noraereul chajaseo (In Search of the Koryoin's Songs, Volumes One and Two), Hwanam, 2007.

《나무의 말이 좋아서》, 김영사, 2019. / Namuui mari joaseo (The Pleasing Words of the Tree), Gimmyoung, 2019.

=== Research Papers ===
(공저) 《광주‧전남 현대사》 상‧하, 실천문학사, 1991. / Gwangju jeonnam hyeondaesa (The Contemporary History of Gwangju and the South Jeolla Province, Volumes One and Two) (co-author), Silcheon, 1991.

《20세기 말과 지역문화》, 나남, 1997. / 20segi malgwa jiyeongmunhwa (Language and Regional Culture in the 20th Century), Nanam, 1997.

=== Critical Biographies ===
(공저) 《김남주론》, 광주, 1988. / Gimnamjuron (co-author) (On Poet Kim Nam-Ju), Gwangju, 1988.

《명노근 평전》, 심미안, 2009. / Myeongnogeun pyeongjeon (A Critical Biography of Myeong Nogeun), Simmian, 2009.

=== Translations ===
O'Brien, Tim, The Things They Carried, 1990 /《그들이 가지고 다닌 것들》, 김준태 역, 한얼미디어, 2004.

== Works in Translation ==
《아아 광주여, 우리나라의 십자가여》, Jeonnam maeil sinmun, 1980. / Gwangju, Cross of Our Nation, Hans Media, 2014.

《아아 광주여, 우리나라의 십자가여》, Jeonnam maeil sinmun, 1980. / <光州へ行く道>, 風媒社, 2018.

《노래 물거미 – 김준태 시선집》, Norae mulgeomi (Song of the water spiders), Gesang der Wasserspinnen. Gedichte. Koreanisch-Deutsch, 2024. Iudicium, München 2024, ISBN 978-3-86205-656-9

== Awards ==
Jeonnam Ilbo and Jeonnam Daily News New Writer's Contest (전남일보‧전남매일 신춘문예, 1969)

Gwangju Literature Award (광주문학상, 1983)

Hyeonsan Literary Award (현산문학상, 1985)

South Jeolla Province Award in Literature (전라남도 문화상 문학 부문, 1995)

Inaugural Illustrious Poet Award (제1회 자랑스런 시인상, 1999)
