= Antipositive, Pt. 1 =

2018 album by Little Big

Studio album by Little Big
- Released: 8 May 2018
- Genres: Dance; rave
- Length: 24:12
- Languages: English and Spanish
- Label: Little Big Family

Little Big chronology
Funeral Rave (2015)	Antipositive, Pt. 1 (2018)	Antipositive, Pt. 2 (2018)

Singles from Antipositive, Pt. 1
- 1. "Lolly Bomb" Released: 8 December 2017

Antipositive, Pt. 1 is the third studio album by the Russian punk-pop-rave group Little Big, released on 8 May 2018 by the Little Big Family record label. The album included the single "Lolly Bomb".

== Background ==
Ilya Prusikin said the following about the album:

Antipositive is a mixture of punk, rave and rap. The new album has more protest, more aggressive music, some tracks have an electric guitar. And against the backdrop of this wild rave - one single lyrical track, cosmic and relaxed.

— Ilya Prusikin

On 24 March 2017, at a concert in Moscow, Little Big announced the release of a new album. On 25 December of the same year, the Knife online magazine published an interview-photo report from the filming of the "Lolly Bomb" music video, in which Ilya Prusikin said:

We are currently working on a new album. We'll spoil it for you - it will be called ANTIPOSITIVE. We also have a brand new show and ideas for a couple of clips.

— Ilya Prusikin

On 3 April 2018, photographer Aleksey Korzov posted an Instagram story where he asks DJ and sound producer Sergey Makarov, one of the band members, about the new album. Sergey answered that the album would be divided into two parts. In early May of the same year, the music video for "Lolly Bomb" won first place at the Los Angeles Film Festival 'Global Film Festival Awards'.

On 8 May 2018, on the day of the album's release, a music video for the song "Punks Not Dead" was released.

== Reception ==
Kanobu reviewer Samim Sarwari noted that the album aims to "capture and disturb the listener's musical and personal space", noting that the album is the story of how Little Big "decided to resurrect punk and kill love in frustration". He also noted that the composition of the song "AK-47", one can hear "a strong influence of trap", and the initial idea of the album's central song is politics, and the final one is protest. Samim called the song "Voice of Hell" an "apocalyptic rave", noting in it references to Alice in Wonderland. Continuing on with "Voice of Hell", reviewer Kanobu said that the last track "bleeds into the raw and raw hatred of 'Hate You'". The last track on the album, "Love Is Dead", was compared by the reviewer with the songs from rapper and singer XXXTentacion and the song from vlogger and rapper Joji.

== Album sequel ==
On 5 October 2018, a follow-up to the album was released titled Antipositive, Pt. 2. It included the single "Skibidi", which was nominated for the ZD Awards 2018 in the categories Trend of the Year and Hype of the Year.

== Track listing ==
All music is composed by Ilya Prusikin.

No.	Title	Length
1.	"Punks Not Dead"	2:18
2.	"AK-47"	3:02
3.	"Antipositive"	3:33
4.	"Faradenza"	2:29
5.	"Lolly Bomb"	3:53
6.	"Voice of Hell"	2:59
7.	"Hate You"	2:04
8.	"Love Is Dead"	3:50
Total length:		24:12
