= Wardah Hafidz =

Indonesian poverty activist

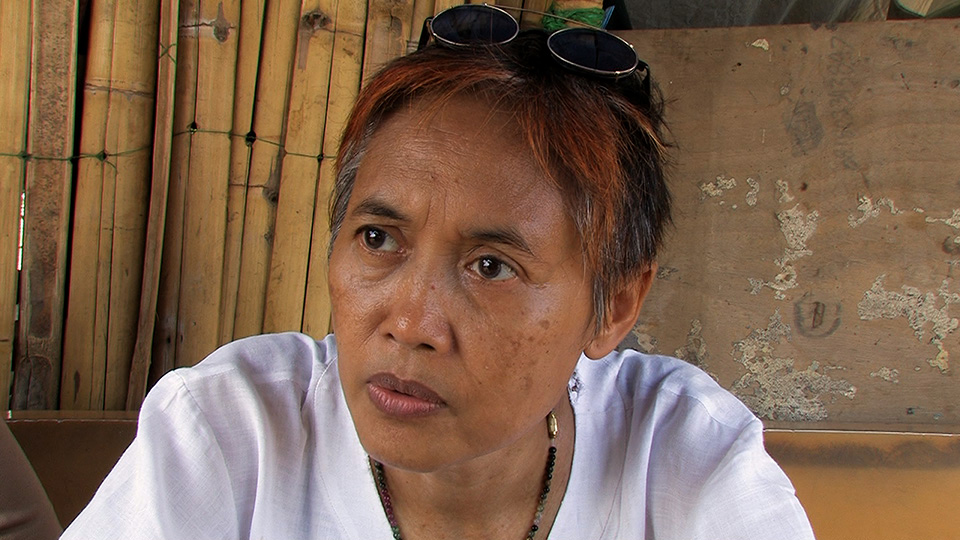
- Wardah Hafidz as main protagonist in the documentary "Jakarta Disorder" (2013) by Ascan Breuer
- Occupation: Coordinator for the Urban Poor Consortium
- Known for: Human rights work
- Awards: Gwangju Prize for Human Rights (2005)

Wardah Hafidz (pronounced [ˈwardah ˈhafɪdz]) is an Indonesian activist lobbying for the rights of the nation's urban poor. She currently serves as coordinator of the Urban Poor Consortium (UPC) and was formerly its head. She is protagonist in the 2013 documentary Jakarta Disorder about gentrification and democratization in Jakarta.

She raised controversy in 1999 after announcing that numerous groups had misused social security funds during the elections, calling it "money politics". The accused groups included the Public Participation Center, Women's Participation Cooperative, the People's Sovereignty Party, and Suharto's former ruling party Golkar. Hafidz said that she was "terrorized" after the disclosures and told to vacate her office as it was located in a residential zone.

For her work in promoting human rights in Indonesia, Hafidz won the 2000 Yap Thiam Hien Award, an annual human rights prize named for Chinese-Indonesian activist Yap Thiam Hien.

In 2002, Hafidz accused the Betawi Brotherhood Forum (BBF) of accepting payment for rallying at Jakarta City Hall after the BBF chased flood-victims organized by UPC with swords and sticks. In response, the head of the Betawi Brotherhood Forum, A. Fadloli El Muhir, publicly threatened to have her arrested, beaten, and escorted to Monas (the National Monument) to clarify her statements. Hafidz ignored the threats, stating that the military and authorities should not use the masses to protect their own interests.

Hafidz alleged in 2003 that the Indonesian government had unclear mechanisms for the distribution of subsidized rice. She stated that the lack of a clear mechanism left the program open for misuse, with the public distribution "mere window-dressing".

In 2005, she won the Gwangju Prize for Human Rights, awarded by the South Korean May 18 Memorial Foundation to recognize "individuals, groups or institutions in Korea and abroad that have contributed in promoting and advancing human rights, democracy and peace through their work."

In 2009, Hafidz organized and presided over a mock trial of the Asian Development Bank for its policies on agriculture, debt, water, gender, the environment, and indigenous people.
