= Lolly Bomb =

2017 Single by Little Big

Single by Little Big

from the album Antipositive, Pt. 1
- Published: 8 December 2017
- Genre: Dance; EDM
- Label: Little Big Family
- Songwriters: Ilya Prusikin; Lubim KhomcHuck; Sergey Makarov

"Lolly Bomb" (Note: Also written "LollyBomb" or "Lollybomb".) is a song by the Russian punk-pop-rave group Little Big. It was released on 8 December 2017 as the lead single from the group's third studio album Antipositive, Pt. 1.

== History ==
In an interview with Knife, the directors said the following about the song:

We came up with the clip somehow by accident, sitting in a cafe - I, Ilyich and Tatarka . We sat, inflated and realized that we really like the idea of Kim and the tender relationship with the bomb.

— Aline Pyazok

In the song, the play on words lollypop and lollybomb refers to a beautiful woman. Her beauty is as explosive as a bomb. I had a sketch for a long time. And we did the song with our team: we wrote the music with Lyubim, the text was written by Fami.

— Ilya Prusikin

The release of the music video was 8 December 2017 on the group's official YouTube channel. The video was directed by Ilya Prusikin and Aline Pyazok.

The clip is set in North Korea, where Kim Jong-Un falls in love with a nuclear missile. Kim and the missile go on dates where they eat ice cream, go shopping, get matching tattoos, and make love. Just as Kim proposes, army men take the missile away from him and launch it into the sky. Kim is very upset about this, but as the video ends, he encounters another bomb and falls in love again.

The group searched for an actor for the role of Kim Jong-Un for a long time. They looked at Russian actors, then Kazakh actors. In the end, they found an Australian actor of Hong Kong origin, Howard X, to play Kim in the video.

== Awards and nominations ==
Year	Country	Prize	Category	Result	References
2018	US	Global Film Festival Awards	Best Music Video	Victory	
2018	Germany	Berlin Music Video Awards	Most Trashy	Victory	
