= Faradenza =

Song by Little Big

from the album Antipositive, Pt. 1
- Language: Fictional
- Released: 8 May 2018
- Genre: Dance; EDM
- Length: 2:29
- Label: Little Big Family
- Songwriter(s): Ilya Prusikin; Lyubim Khomchuk

"Faradenza" is a song by Russian rave band Little Big, released on 8 May 2018 as part of the album Antipositive, Pt. 1. The song was released via the Little Big Family record label. The author of the lyrics and the song was the leader of the group Ilya Prusikin. The music producer was Viktor Sibrinin and the media producer of the Khleb group Lyubim Khomchuk. The music video was released on 9 August 2018. The video has over 440 million views and 2.5 million likes on YouTube.

== Music video ==
According to the plot of the video, Ilya arrives at the Zarya resort for the elderly, where he charms all the pensioners vacationing there, thanks to the special aroma from the Faradenza spray.

The clip received wide popularity in Russia. At the end of 2018, the song, like 'Skibidi', hit the top 10 most popular music video in Russia on YouTube.
