= Gwangju Prize for Human Rights =

Award given by South Korean foundation

The Gwangju Prize for Human Rights (Korean: 광주 인권상; Hanja: 光州人權賞) is an award given by the South Korean May 18 Memorial Foundation to recognize "individuals, groups or institutions in Korea and abroad that have contributed in promoting and advancing human rights, democracy and peace through their work." The award is intended to commemorate the spirit of the May 1980 Gwangju Democratization Movement (also known as "518" for its 18 May start), in which pro-democracy citizens battled soldiers in protest of the military reign of Chun Doo-hwan. As the organization's website explains, "Gwangju received valuable help from others while undertaking the struggle to examine the truth behind the May 18 uprising, and while striving to develop true democracy. In response, we would like to give something back to those who supported our cause for peace and democracy." As of 2011, the prize carried a cash award of US$50,000.

On 18 December 2018, the May 18 Memorial Foundation announced its cancellation of Suu Kyi's award due to her inaction in ceasing the inhumane acts and human rights atrocities against the Rohingya people.

== List of Gwangju Prize for Human Rights Laureates ==
Year	Awardee	Country
2025	Asia Justice and Rights (AJAR)	Indonesia
2024	Suganthini Mathiyamuthan Thangaras	Sri Lanka
2023	Chow Hang-tung	Hong Kong
2022	Cynthia Maung	Myanmar
2021	Arnon Nampa	Thailand
2020	Bedjo Untung	Indonesia
2019	Joanna Cariño	Philippines
2018	Fr. Nandana Manatunga	Sri Lanka
2017	Jatupat Boonpattararaksa	Thailand
2016	Nguyen Dan Que	Vietnam
2016	Bersih	Malaysia
2015	Latifah Anum Siregar	Indonesia
2014	Adilur Rahman Khan	Bangladesh
2014	Mothers of Khavaran	Iran
2013	H.I.J.O.S	Argentina
2012	Mun Jeong Hyeon	South Korea
2011	Binayak Sen	India
2010	Sushil Pyakurel	Nepal
2009	Min Ko Naing	Myanmar
2008	Muneer A. Malik	Pakistan
2007	Irom Chanu Sharmila	India
2007	Lenin Raghuvanshi	India
2006	Malalai Joya	Afghanistan
2006	Angkhana Neelaphaijit	Thailand
2005	Wardah Hafidz	Indonesia
2004	Aung San Suu Kyi (withdrawn)	Myanmar
2003	Dandeniya Gamage Jayanthi	Sri Lanka
2002	Korean Association of Bereaved Families for Democracy	South Korea
2001	Basil Fernando	Sri Lanka
2000	Xanana Gusmão	East Timor

== See also ==
- Indian Weekender article
- The Jakarta Post article
- Bulatlat article
