= Basil Fernando =

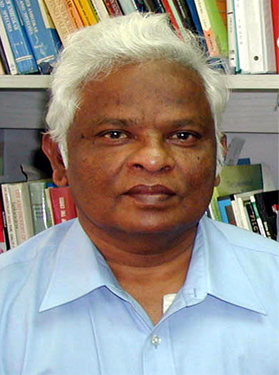
Basil FernandoBorn Died 30/09/2026

W.J. Basil Fernando (Sinhala: ඩබ්ලිව්. ජේ. බැසිල් ප්‍රනාන්දු) (Born 14 October 1944 - Died 30 September 2026) is a Sri Lankan jurist, author, poet, human rights activist, editor of Article 2 and Ethics in Action, and a prolific writer. He was educated at St. Anthony's College, Wattala and St. Benedict's College, Kotahena. He earned an LL.B. from the University of Ceylon in 1972, registered as an Attorney-At-Law of the Supreme Court of Sri Lanka in 1980 and practised law in Sri Lanka up to the end of 1989. He became a legal adviser to Vietnamese refugees in a UNHCR-sponsored project in Hong Kong. He joined the United Nations Transitional Authority (UNTAC) in 1992 as a senior human rights officer and later also served as the Chief of Legal Assistance to Cambodia of the UN Centre of Human Rights (now the UN High Commissioner of Human Rights office). He is associated with Asian Human Rights Commission and Asian Legal Resource centre, based in Hong Kong since 1994. In 2014, he was awarded the Right Livelihood Award for "his tireless and outstanding work to support and document the implementation of human rights in Asia."

== Jurisprudence ==
In Cambodia, he began to write on problems of rule law in post-communist societies, which he later continued to develop into problems of justice in Asian societies. He has written extensively on this theme, basing his work on studies on Sri Lanka, Cambodia and several other Asian countries. In three interconnected publications, The phantom limb: Failing judicial systems, torture and human rights work in Sri Lanka; Recovering the authority of public institutions: A resource book on human rights in Sri Lanka; Sri Lanka: Impunity, criminal justice and human rights, he analysed to collapse of rule of law institutions in Sri Lanka. This study has provided a model for such studies elsewhere.

== Civil Society ==
Through a study entitled Demoralization and Hope – creating the social foundations for sustaining democracy, a comparative study of ideas of N.F.S. Grungtvig of Denmark and B.R. Ambedkar of India, he contributed to the development of civil society theory. This led to the introduction of the folk school concept into human rights work in several Asian projects. This includes the Human Rights Correspondence School.

== Poetry and Other Creative Writings ==
As a poet he first published his poems in English in 1972 in collection entitled A New Era to Emerge. Reviewing this collection, M.I. Kuruwilla, a prominent literary critic at the time, wrote to Navasilu 1976, " I feel that among those writing English poetry in Sri Lanka Basil Fernando is unique in many respects. In fact, although his output may be small, in range and depth he could stand his own ground when compared with poets writing in a more vital tradition that ours, for example the African poets."

Later, Basil wrote several collections in English as well as Sinhala. His most recent collections are The Sea Was Calm behind your house (2009) and Cheena Gedera Kirillege Geethaya (2009), a Sinhala collection. Basil's poems have been included several anthologies published in Sri Lanka and other countries. His poems were also reviewed by Anders Sjobohm in World Literature Today .

Professor K.G. Sankara Pillai, a well known Indian poet, sums up the spirit of Basil Fernando's poems thus: "Basil Fernando belongs to another breed of poets. Basil is delighted to tell stories. Through those stories he releases the dilemmas of our dreadful time and reveals his priorities in a creative career. Basil believes that the mission of poetry is narrating the nation; narrating the reality; the nation of the poorest majority of the people. His faith is in the ethics of imagination. The idyllic landscape, the nuanced narrative, the resonant image is absent in Basil's poetry. Using straight and steady masculine linguistic structure in his poems, Basil opts to be a confident narrator of the times he witnesses, and a credible reporter of the cultural roots-spread beneath human relations we are tactfully farming. Basil believes that knowing the hard realities would alarm people. He dislikes allowing sleeping or dead words to ride on the horses of his poems.

"We see in Basil's poems a narrator terribly worried over a madly chaotic world. His poems warn us against the speed with which our spiritual/social rivers are drying up. Our lives have become unbearably narrow. We are unaware of the crime we committed and the reason for our arrest. This is a frightening reoccurrence of a typical Kafkaesque situation. Basil's poetry seeks with urgency the reasons for the unreasoned and rationale for the irrational.

"Fascism exhibits facts, but hides reality. Fascism announces might, but silences the cry. We can't see which heavy weights are crushing us in the centre of the roads, in the abyss of time. We are not taught in schools or universities who are fabricating our lives as condemned cells. Basil has sought in his poems to convey the pain and ignorance prevailing in his land, in every land. He has written poems as critiques of authoritarianism and orthodoxy fighting against the people to maintain the power they celebrate now."

He has also published short stories. Several of his stories were published in Japan by Le Roy Robinson. Robinson also published a series interviews with Basil Fernando, which was later published under the title Village at the River Mouth by the English Writers Association. He is a member of the Sri Lanka English Writers Association and a regular contributor to its publication Channels.

== Human Rights ==
He is an Editor of two quarterly publications, Article 2 and Ethics in Action. As a human rights activist he is particularly engaged in the elimination of police torture in Sri Lanka and several countries in Asia. Two other major concerns are forced disappearances and caste discrimination. He is also writer of numerous articles and opinion columns. He wrote a weekly UPI column from 2007 to 2009 and writes regularly other publications such as the Sri Lanka Guardian. He was the executive director of the Asian Human Rights Commission (AHRC) and Asian Legal Resource Centre (ALRC) from 1994 to July 2010 and now continues with the same organisation as their Director for Policy and Programs. He designed the redevelopment of the two organisations with the perspective of developing an understanding of human rights enforcement that answers the need of countries in Asia and other 'non-rule of law' contexts. He worked for the development of the Asian Human Rights Charter and Asian Rule of Law Charter. In his work he emphasises the need to develop ideas around Article 2 of the International Covenant on Civil and political Rights (ICCPR). He is a Senior Asoska Fellow and a Sohmen Visitor at the Faculty of Law, of The University of Hong Kong.

In 2001, he won the Gwangju Prize for Human Rights, which honours "individuals, groups or institutions in Korea and abroad that have contributed in promoting and advancing human rights, democracy and peace through their work." In 2014, he was awarded the Right Livelihood Award, a Swedish international award to "honor and support those offering practical and exemplary answers to the most urgent challenges facing us today."

== Books – In English ==
- Modernization versus Militarization in Sri Lanka
- The problems facing the Cambodian legal system
- Demoralization and Hope
- The Right to Speak Loudly: Essays on Law and Human Rights
- An X-ray of the Sri Lankan Policing System & Torture of the Poor
- The Phantom limb—Failing Judicial Systems, Torture and Human Rights Work in Sri Lanka
- Recovering the authority of public institutions—a resource book on Human Rights in Sri Lanka.
- Sri Lanka Impunity, Criminal Justice & Human Rights

== Books in Sinhala Language ==
- Manawa Himikam Pahana
- Karyakshamabawaya Pragnagocharabawaya Ha Sri Lankawe Neethi Kramaya
- Rate Neethiya Muhunadena Thathkaleena Abiyogaya
- Lalith Rajapakshage Wadahinsa Naduwa
- Neethiye Adipathyaya Ha Manawa Himikam
- Sanwadashilee Samajaya Ha Kula Kramaye Adeenawa
- Lankawe Manawa Himikam Gatalu Saha Awata Visadum
- Neethiya Vihiluwak Bawata Herennata Ida Hareema
- Diribindeema Ha Apekshawa
