= Angkhana Neelaphaijit =

Thai politician and human rights activist (born 1956)

- อังคณา นีละไพจิตร
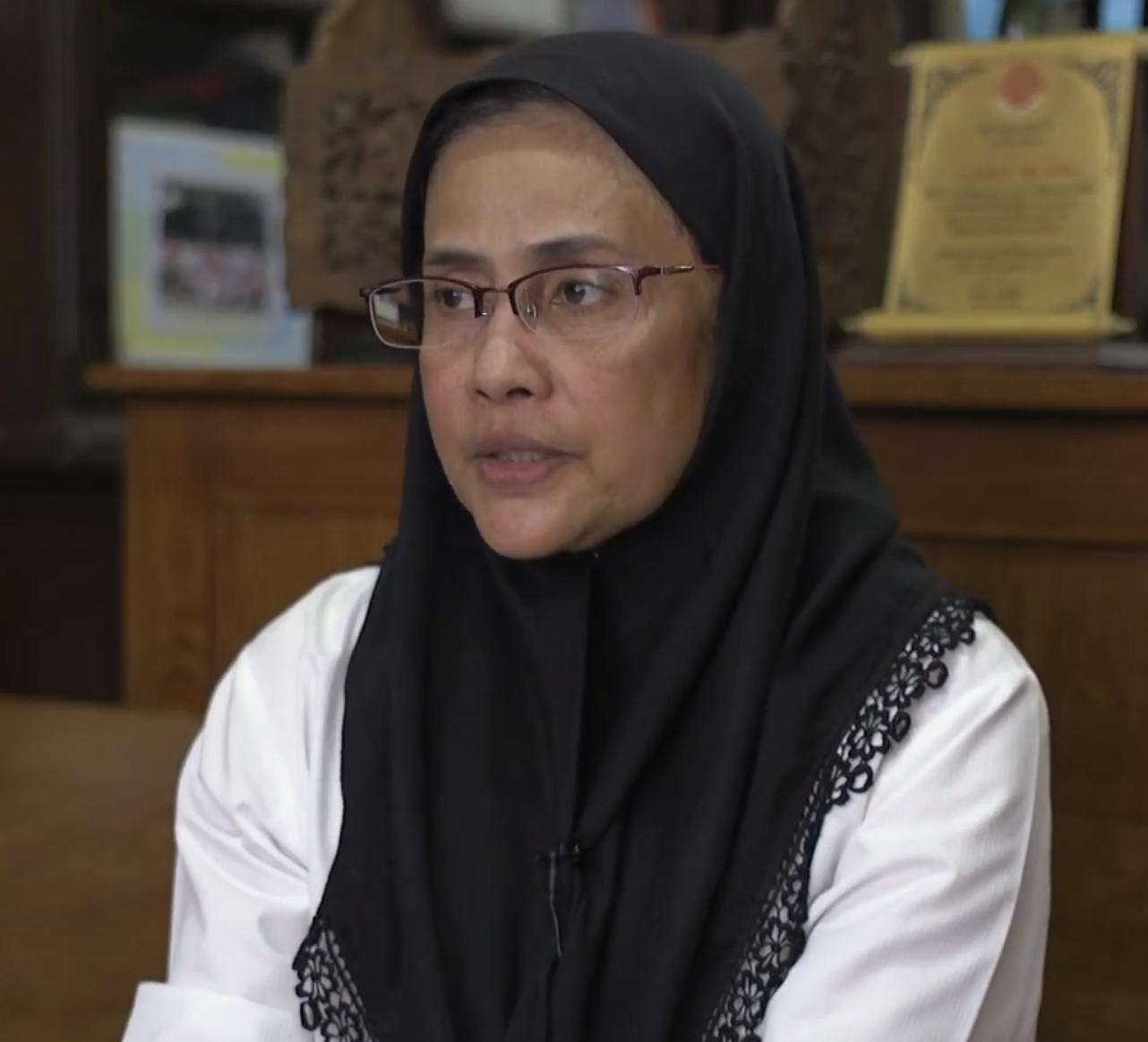
- Angkhana Neelaphaijit in 2017

Member of the Senate of Thailand
- Incumbent
- Assumed office 10 July 2024

Member of the Constitution Drafting Assembly of Thailand
- In office 8 January 2007 – 18 July 2007

Personal details
- Born: Angkhana Wongrachen Thai: อังคณา วงศ์ราเชนทร์ 23 March 1956 (age 70)
- Spouse: Somchai Neelaphaijit (disappeared 24 March 2004)
- Occupation: Human rights activist; Senator
- Awards: Gwangju Prize for Human Rights (2006)

Angkhana Neelaphaijit (Thai: อังคณา นีละไพจิตร; RTGS: Angkhana Nilaphaichit), née Angkhana Wongrachen (อังคณา วงศ์ราเชนทร์), is a Thai human rights activist, former member of the National Human Rights Commission, and the wife of disappeared human rights lawyer Somchai Neelaphaijit. Amnesty International described her as "a leading human rights defender in Southern Thailand".

== Husband's disappearance ==
In the early-2000s, southern Thailand suffered a wave of unrest, including an ethnic separatist insurgency. In 2003, four Thai Muslims (Waemahadi Wae-dao, a doctor; Maisuru Haji Abdulloh, a school owner; his son, Muyahid; and a manual labourer, Samarn Wae-kaji) were arrested and charged with planning bombings for the militant Islamic organization Jemaah Islamiyah. Angkhana's husband, Somchai, their defense attorney, accused state security forces of having abused and tortured the men in custody. Angkhana reported harassment and threats by police. On 24 March 2004, a group of men seized Somchai as he left a hotel in a Bangkok suburb, forcing him into a vehicle. He has not been seen since.

== Investigation and trial ==
Angkhana pursued a court case against the officers she alleged to responsible for her husband's disappearance, but was frustrated at what she perceived to be a government cover-up. Police officials refused to share relevant records with her, citing national security, leading the New York Times to describe the truth as "hidden behind a wall of official obscurity." Angkhana also reported a police harassment and anonymous threats, recalling those allegedly sent to her husband before his disappearance. She eventually filed a complaint with the United Nations, in which she stated, "We do not see any genuine goodwill from the authorities."

In 2006, Thai Prime Minister Thaksin Shinawatra stated that Somchai Neelaphaijit was dead and may have been killed by state security forces. On 12 January 2006, one policeman was jailed for having "illegally detained" Somchai, but four others were acquitted. Angkhana and several international human rights groups "denounced the verdict."

On 2 August 2009, bone fragments were found in the Mae Klong River believed to belong to Somchai. In September 2010, more than six years after her husband's disappearance, Angkhana told reporters, "I haven't given up my attempts to call for justice for my husband ... No matter which party controls the government, I ask it to help investigate the case."

On 17 March 2011, after several delays, a Thai appeals court acquitted Ngern Thongsuk, the only convicted defendant in the case, saying that it had not been conclusively determined whether Somchai had died. Following the verdict, Angkhana told reporters she "would continue to fight for justice and take the case to the Supreme Court." The Asian Human Rights Commission condemned the verdict and renewed calls for police to investigate continued threats against Angkhana and her family.

On 30 April 2019, the National Human Rights Commission (Thailand) began a disciplinary inquiry of Angkhana on the basis of political partiality accusations. The Human Rights Watch (HRW) reported that the inquiry focused on her role observing legal proceedings and documenting rights violations against opposition politicians. HRW's Asia director Brad Adams said, "Thailand's rights commission is sinking to a new low by seeking to punish Angkhana for doing her job by exposing rights abuses and demanding accountability. The commission’s leadership has repeatedly failed to hold the military government to its human rights obligations, but it appears now to be doing the junta's dirty work."

== Ongoing work and recognition ==
Angkhana currently serves as the chairwoman of the Working Group for Justice and Peace, and continues to investigate allegations of police abuse in southern Thailand. Amnesty International and Front Line report that her safety continues to be threatened, and in 2009, her car was robbed of documents relating to one of her cases.

In 2006, Angkhana, along with Malalai Joya of Afghanistan, won the Gwangju Prize for Human Rights, which honors "individuals, groups or institutions in Korea and abroad that have contributed in promoting and advancing human rights, democracy and peace through their work". On 11 March 2011, she received the Asian Human Rights Defender Award of the Asian Human Rights Commission on her husband's behalf; the award's press release also praised her "role as an articulate and courageous spokesperson for the families of disappeared persons in Thailand".

In 2011, Josefina Bergsten's documentary UNJUST, which prominently features Angkhana's story, was given a Special Jury Award at the Hague's Movies that Matter Festival.

In 2016, Angkhana was appointed to the Thai National Human Rights Commission. She resigned from the commission in 2019, along with Commissioner Tuenjai Deetes, citing restrictive regulations and a hostile and environment.

In November 2019, Angkhana was sued for criminal defamation by Thammakaset Co., Ltd., a poultry company in Lopburi Province. She was accused of sharing two posts about alleged Thammakaset labour abuses that contained links to the press statements of 16 organizations. However, in August 2023, the court found her not guilty of the criminal defamation charges.

On 31 July 2026, Angkhana filed a complaint with the Bangkok police after numerous posts on social media were made accusing her of being "unpatriotic" and sympathetic to the separatist group Barisan Revolusi Nasional; some of the posts stated she should be killed or disappeared.
