= Nam Jung-hyun =

South Korean writer (1933–2020)

- Born: December 13, 1933
- Died: December 21, 2020 (aged 87)
- Spouse: Sun-nam
- Writing career
- Language: Korean

Korean name
- Hangul: 남정현
- RR: Nam Jeonghyeon
- MR: Nam Chŏnghyŏn

Nam Jung-hyun (Korean: 남정현; December 13, 1933 – December 21, 2020) was a South Korean writer who often clashed with the Korean government.

== Life and career ==
Nam Jung-hyun was born December 13, 1933, in Seosan, Chungcheongnam-do, Korea, Empire of Japan. He was the first son in a family of two sons and two daughters. He grew up as a sickly infant, who first thought of entering a career in writing when he read The Count of Monte Cristo while in the hospital for the treatment of tuberculosis. He married Sun-nam in 1958 and made his literary debut with the publication of Warning Zone. In 1961 his writing brought him into conflict with the government and when his work Land of Excrement (분지) was re-published in North Korea. Nam continued to write anti-government pieces, and was imprisoned two more times.

Nam died on December 21, 2020, at the age of 87.

== Work ==
Using literary techniques of hyperbole, irony, allegory, and satire to depict inverted values of the modern man and the society in which he lives, Nam Jeonghyeon has unleashed strong invectives against the oppressive political regime and the corrupt society. “The Land of Excrement” (Bunji, 1965), for example, likens post-war South Korea as a polluted land overrun by cunning, flattery, and abuses of power on the one hand, and by American imperialism on the other. An acerbic indictment of the South Korean situation in the 1960s, the work was later reprinted in the North Korean journal, Unification Front Line (Tongil jeonseon). This fact was used by South Korean authorities, who then found Nam in violation of the Anti-Communist Law and sentenced him to imprisonment. He was released in 1967 but was jailed a second time in 1974 on charges of violating the notorious Presidential Emergency Ordinance No.1. It is precisely such abuses of power and the resulting injustice, of which he has been a victim, that Nam denounces in his fiction. The voice of critique reaches its height in “A Letter to Father” (Buju jeonsangseo). But Nam Jeonghyeon's critique of all-pervasive injustice, as scathing as it is, can often leave the reader feeling somewhat hollow. His works stop at addressing surface phenomena and fail to reflect on what may lie crouched underneath.

== Works in translation ==
- Land of Excrement (분지, 2013)

== Works in Korean (partial) ==
Short Stories

- “A Letter to Father” (Buju jeonsangseo)
- “Warning Zone” (Gyeonggo guyeok)
- “An Imitation Corpse” (Moui siche)
- “What Are You?” (Neoneun mwonya)
- “An Epilogue to Revolution” (Hyeongmyeong hugi)
- “Mr. Heoheo” (Heoheo seonsaeng)
- “The Land of Excrement” (Bunji, 1965)

Novels

- The Sound of Loving (Saranghaneun sori).

== Awards ==
- Reserve Dong-in Literature Prize
