= Howard X =

Impersonator of Kim Jong Un

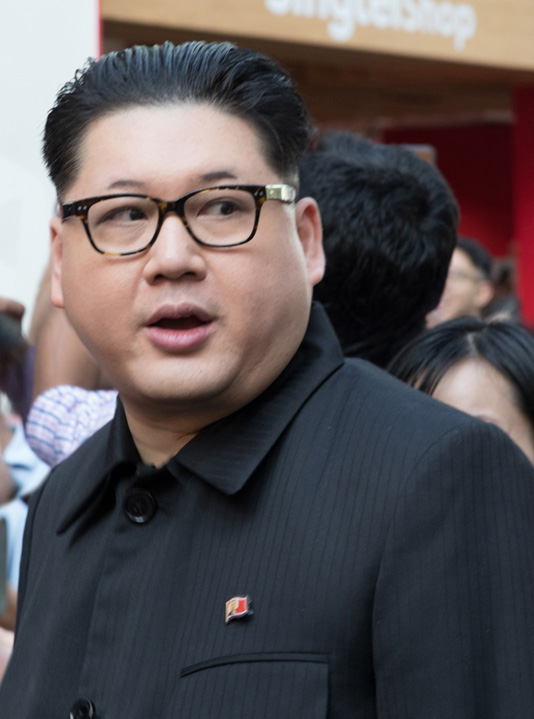
- Howard X in character as Kim Jong Un
- Born: Hong Kong
- Occupations: Impersonator of Kim Jong-Un; Music producer
- Years active: 2011–present
- Website: https://kim-jongun.com/

Howard Lee, known professionally as Howard X, is a Hong Kong-Australian music producer, political satirist and media personality. He is best known as the world's first professional impersonator of Kim Jong Un, the Supreme Leader of North Korea.

Amongst Howard X's most well-known pranks are his appearance at the Rio Summer Olympics in 2016 and when he visited North Korean cheerleaders on Valentine's Day at the PyeongChang Winter Olympics in 2018 which attracted media attention. Throughout his career as a professional impersonator he has also worked with multiple organisations and celebrities to create parodies and to stir up conversations of politics and human rights. He believes that humour is a very powerful weapon and he often makes it clear that he imitates the dictator to satirise him, not to glorify him.

He is well known for using satire to show his support for Hong Kong's pro-democracy movement and for the liberation of North Korea. He also used his prominence to assist persecuted impersonators and drew attention to humanitarian issues around the world with them. His resemblance to Kim Jong Un has seen him detained or deported due to political concerns. He is often interviewed by the press and hired for commercials due to his activism and work as an impersonator. In 2021, it was reported that he was raided and arrested at his home by the Hong Kong government, sparking concerns that he was targeted by the ruling Chinese Communist Party.

In early November 2022, he announced that he would contest Victorian Premier Daniel Andrews' electorate of Mulgrave as an independent candidate at the Victorian state election under the name 'Howard Lee'. He came second-last out of 14 candidates, attracting 0.3% of the vote.

== Early life ==
Born in Hong Kong and growing up in Australia, Howard X holds a Bachelor's in Jazz Performance from Australia. Before working as an impersonator, he worked as a music producer for a Brazilian band from Melbourne known as Bossa Negra.

== Impersonation career ==
=== Early career ===
Howard X began his career of impersonating the North Korean leader Kim Jong Un after his father Kim Jong Il introduced him to the world stage. He had dressed up like Kim Jong Un for April Fool's Day, and upon sharing a picture on Facebook, an Israeli fast-food chain Burger Ranch hired him for a television commercial.

=== 2013 ===
In a 2013 interview with ABC, he believed that satire is a powerful weapon against any dictatorship and it is important for the world to have more awareness about a country which he believed could have the ability to spark World War III. While it was fun to be a Kim Jong Un doppelgänger, he wished to stir up dialogues about North Korea and its human rights issues.

=== 2014 ===
During the 2014 Hong Kong Protests known as Umbrella Movement in Hong Kong, Howard X visited students protesting for democratic elections with a sign that read, "No North Korea style elections in Hong Kong." Although he was drawing some media attention to the student's cause in his character, he made it clear that his impersonation the Supreme Leader to satirize him, not to glorify him. He believed that "having a face of a dictator can send a powerful message where people can use to bring attention to injustice".

Since then, he sometimes teams up with other famous impersonators notably such as Donald Trump impersonators Dennis Alan and Russell White, Steve who impersonates Vladimir Putin, Reggie Brown who impersonates Barack Obama, FauxBojo Drew Galdron who impersonates Boris Johnson and many more.

=== 2015 ===
In September 2015 during a segment of Australian breakfast television program Today Show where Howard X was interviewed for his impersonation, he commented on air that he would like to have North Korea to be liberated than it be "a hellhole that it is today".

In October 2015, Howard X flew to Bulgaria for popular German fashion online retailer About You for a television commercial.

=== 2016 ===
In early 2016, Howard X was seen on several television commercials. He starred in the bubble tea parody commercial by the Taiwanese global franchise teahouse Chatime which aired on SBS and Pop Asia in Australia and he was also featured in a Schlag den Raab promotion among other celebrity impersonators which was aired on German television channel ProSieben for the new season of the live game show such as Chuck Norris, Lady Gaga, Johnny Depp, Queen Elizabeth and Pope Benedict XVI impersonators.

In the same year, Howard X had also travelled to Rio de Janeiro to attend the Rio Summer Olympics. He attended the games and closing ceremony in his character and confused spectators by simultaneously waving both a North Korean flag and a rainbow flag. He was also approached by North Korean delegates dressed in DPRK tracksuits as they thought he was the real Kim Jong Un. He received attention online for his impersonation and was on Reddit’s homepage.

In a mini documentary produced by Urban Tales, Howard X shared that he spent at least two hours to get ready for his Kim Jong Un look, constantly studied his mannerism and had to be updated with everything that's happening in North Korea. He also emphasised it is a satire and that the last thing he want to do with his impersonation is to make Kim Jong Un look good.

Howard X also starred in a comedy short film entitled The Landowner, produced by the American film production company Funny Or Die. It was a parody of popular short film The Landlord which was by the same creators, written by Adam McKay and Will Ferrell.

=== 2017 ===
In 2017, Howard X had a collaboration parody commercial entitled "Who invented the burger? Alternative Facts by Dear Leader Kim Jong Un" with the European sunshade brand Dear Leader. The organisation actively supported North Korean resistance groups.

In December 2017, Howard X starred in the viral official music video of Russian rave band Little Big’s Lolly Bomb. As of January 2025, the music video has amassed over 183 million views on YouTube.

In the same year, there was also a comical television commercial produced by Film Factory Hong Kong for Wilson Communications featuring Donald Trump, Kim Jong Un and Vladimir Putin impersonators.

=== 2018 ===
In 2018, it was revealed that Howard X also works as part time agent to find the best impersonators in the world. In one instance, he had travelled to Iran for a Lionel Messi lookalike for a World Cup campaign in Hong Kong.

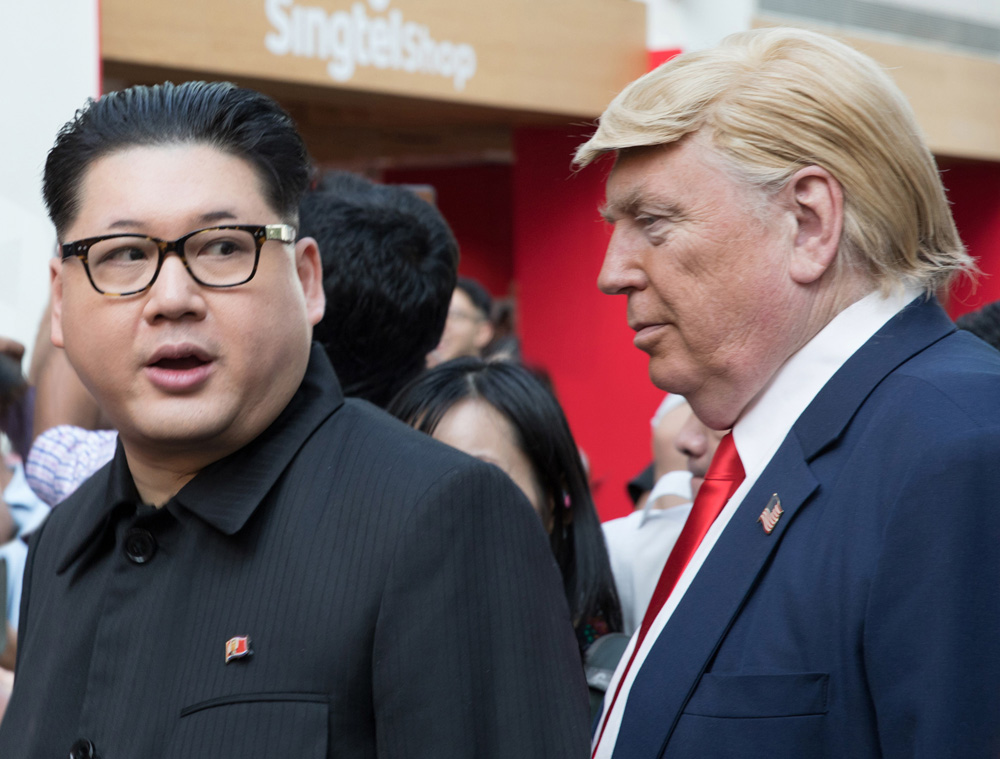
Howard X in character as Kim Jong Un (left) with Dennis Alan in character as Donald Trump during the 2018 North Korea–United States Singapore Summit

In early February 2018, Donald Trump impersonator Dennis Alan and Howard X made headlines on many news channels for their appearances together at the PyeongChang Winter Olympics opening ceremony. The duo jokingly stated they believed their political satire had inspired the 2018 North Korea–United States Singapore Summit as before these events, the relationship between the two countries were at all-time low where war of words were frequent between the real presidents due to tensions regarding North Korea's missile and nuclear programme. The impersonators flew together to Singapore before the actual summit to show solidarity towards the event.

On Valentine's Day 2018, Howard X visited the North Korean cheerleaders during the ice hockey games and was seen waving the Korean Reunification Flag. However, he was physically assaulted by North Korean agents while he was being escorted out of the stadium. The incident received a lot of media attention.

In May 2018, Howard X was featured among other world leader impersonators for a Ramadhan-themed commercial by Kuwaiti-based Zain Group commercial. It went viral, catching the attention of Jordanian Queen Rania whom praised the world "would do well to listen to children's voices".

In the same year, Howard X was the General Kim featured in a dual-platform military war game by a Taiwanese gaming company which was released in Taiwan, Hong Kong and Macau. He was also seen in a parody commercial with Israeli company Hot Telecommunication Systems.

In a press release, Howard X claimed that he was exploited by the production team of The Late Late Show with James Corden after flying from Hong Kong to Los Angeles under short notice, only to have the gig cancelled once he landed in the US where he was replaced by another impersonator who would work for a fraction of his fee. Howard X was also not paid any compensation and was suggested to rent his custom-made suit to make some money out of the trip. He detailed the incident on his official pages to give the general public an idea of what performing artists have to put up with. He described this experience as the worst of the worst in the 18 years that he had been gigging as a musician and now as an impersonator and said, "If they are willing to do this to a high-profile impersonator such as myself, imagine what others who have a lower profile have to put up with."

During 2018 FIFA World Cup, Vladimir Putin impersonator Steve and Howard X travelled to Samara, Russia for the Russia-Uruguay match. They were the centre of attention off the pitch and were busy entertaining fans' requests for selfies.

=== 2019 ===
In February 2019, Howard X joined Rodrigo Duterte impersonator Cresencio Extreme in attending an hour-long service at St Joseph's Church and at Filipino fast-food restaurant Jollibee while eating fried chicken. The church they visited had been one of Duterte's most outspoken critics, particularly over alleged human rights abuses during his anti-narcotics campaign.

Prior to the 2019 North Korea–United States Hanoi Summit, Howard X and another Donald Trump impersonator by the name Russell White made a trip to Hanoi, Vietnam. While the latter could stay, Howard was infamously deported. Phil Robertson, the deputy Asia director for Human Rights Watch, said that it was "truly absurd and despicable" that Vietnam was harassing and threatening Howard X.

In a 2019 interview with TIME, he explained that although his impersonation occasionally lands in hot water, most of his gigs almost always evoke laughters. He also mentioned that he was sure that the real Kim Jong Un knows about him.

During 2019 G20 Osaka summit, Howard X and Donald Trump impersonator Dennis Alan travelled to Osaka, Japan, ahead of the G-20 leaders' summit in the city. The crowd were surprised and amused to see the impersonators of the leaders. People welcomed the impersonators, as they interacted and posed for pictures with them.

In June 2019, Howard X participated the historic 2019 anti-extradition bill march against the controversial 2019 Hong Kong extradition bill which organisers reported there were more than 1 million people in attendance. He held a sign that said "No Extradition To Communist Countries". The government-proposed bill prompted a series of 2019–20 Hong Kong protests as it would allow the extradition of suspected criminals to mainland China, where human rights abuses are rife and death sentences common. Described as one of the largest and most unified protests in more than a decade, the massive march prompted rallies in solidarity in at least 29 cities around the world.

In August 2019, Howard X had formed a political satire band The Tyrants and were spotted at the Edinburgh Festival Fringe with Donald Trump and Boris Johnson impersonators promoting their jazz parody fringe show. At one point, #MeToo activist actress Rose McGowan tweeted a photo of them on board a bus in Edinburgh while she was there.

In September 2019, Howard X made an appearance at a peaceful protest in Melbourne which sparked rounds of applause. Aside from pro-democracy protestors, some members of the Uyghur community and several pro-Beijing protestors also turned up.

=== 2020 ===
Despite the ongoing COVID-19 pandemic, Howard X continued to show his support for Hong Kong city's pro-democracy movements where he was sometimes spotted by the media. One of his appearances was when protestors gathered at IFC mall in Central Hong Kong to chant pro-democracy slogans and sing songs related to the anti-extradition movement in which he appeared with an inflatable missile. On July 1, Howard X was also spotted at a Hong Kong rally against the new national security laws. When asked if he supported the new laws, the impersonator responded “Do not turn Hong Kong into another Pyongyang.” The protest coincided with the anniversary of the Handover of Hong Kong to China from the British in 1997.

In the same year when the real Kim Jong Un vanished out of spotlight for months and reappeared later for an event, Howard X was interviewed by the New York Post as there was a wild theory that a body double for Kim Jong Un appeared at a recent event in order to hide the fact that the Supreme Leader is dying. He said that there is no way the North Korean regime could find a convincing Kim Jong Un lookalike in the food-starved nation because he is too obese. He also believed that footages that emerged from years ago that purports to show the dictator's hired doppelgänger is bogus. In the interview, Howard X also revealed that he had maintained his pudgy physique through a strict regime of not exercising and eating a lot of quality steaks but he still weighs about 50 pounds less than the tubby tyrant.

=== 2021 ===
In January 2021, several non-profit news websites such as Hong Kong Free Press and Radio Free Asia reported that Howard X was raided and arrested at his home by the Hong Kong government over suspicion of "possession of firearm without license". However, none were found in the raid and his iPhone was confiscated during interview at the police station. In interviews with the press, he said that he believed the arrest was politically motivated as he had always shown support towards Hong Kong city's pro-democracy movements and he felt that "Hong Kong used to be a free city but it's gradually getting a lot more like Pyongyang". As a professional impersonator of Kim Jong Un, he often makes use of and owns a number of replica BB guns, missiles and nuclear bombs for his performances and videos. Since he was required to report to the police station every six weeks, he made sure to arrive in character with his inflatable missile to highlight the ridiculous grounds of his arrest. This incident had sparked concerns that he could have been targeted by the ruling Chinese Communist Party.

=== 2022 ===
In March 2022, Howard X and Putin impersonator Steve Poland collaborated with Umid Isabaev, the double of Ukrainian president Volodymyr Zelenskyy, to help Isabaev escape Kyiv. Reportedly, Howard X has also been using his likeness to perform humanitarian works to help another impersonator Abbas Alizada who was known as Afghan Bruce Lee, to flee a war-ravaged country.

On Friday 13 May, Howard X disrupted an event at an electronics factory in Mount Waverley, Melbourne, while the Prime Minister Of Australia, Scott Morrison was visiting with Liberal MP for the Division of Chisholm, Gladys Liu. He was confronted by the media and the owners of the factory while calling "everyone to vote for Gladys Liu" sarcastically, and that she was the "Communist candidate for Chisholm". He was forced to leave and was confronted by police. The event occurred amidst heightened tensions between Australia and China, and investigations into Liu's possible affiliations with the Chinese Communist Party.

In November, he contested Victorian Premier Daniel Andrews' electorate of Mulgrave as an independent candidate at the Victorian state election, under the name 'Howard Lee'. However, he only received 120 first-preference votes (0.32% of votes) and was not elected.

=== 2023 ===
In September 2023, Howard X appeared on a stream by popular Kick streamer Adin Ross in a staged 'interview' mimicking the central theme of the film The Interview, receiving a peak viewership of 700,000 in the process.

== Music career ==
Howard X is also a drummer and runs a Samba school in Hong Kong. In 2009, he was in Rio de Janeiro, Brazil to form his band Bossa Negra to begin music production or collaboration. In 2018, he received nomination for the best producer award at Golden Melody Awards in 2018 for his album Brazilian Essence Deluxe Edition.
