= Tuenjai Deetes =

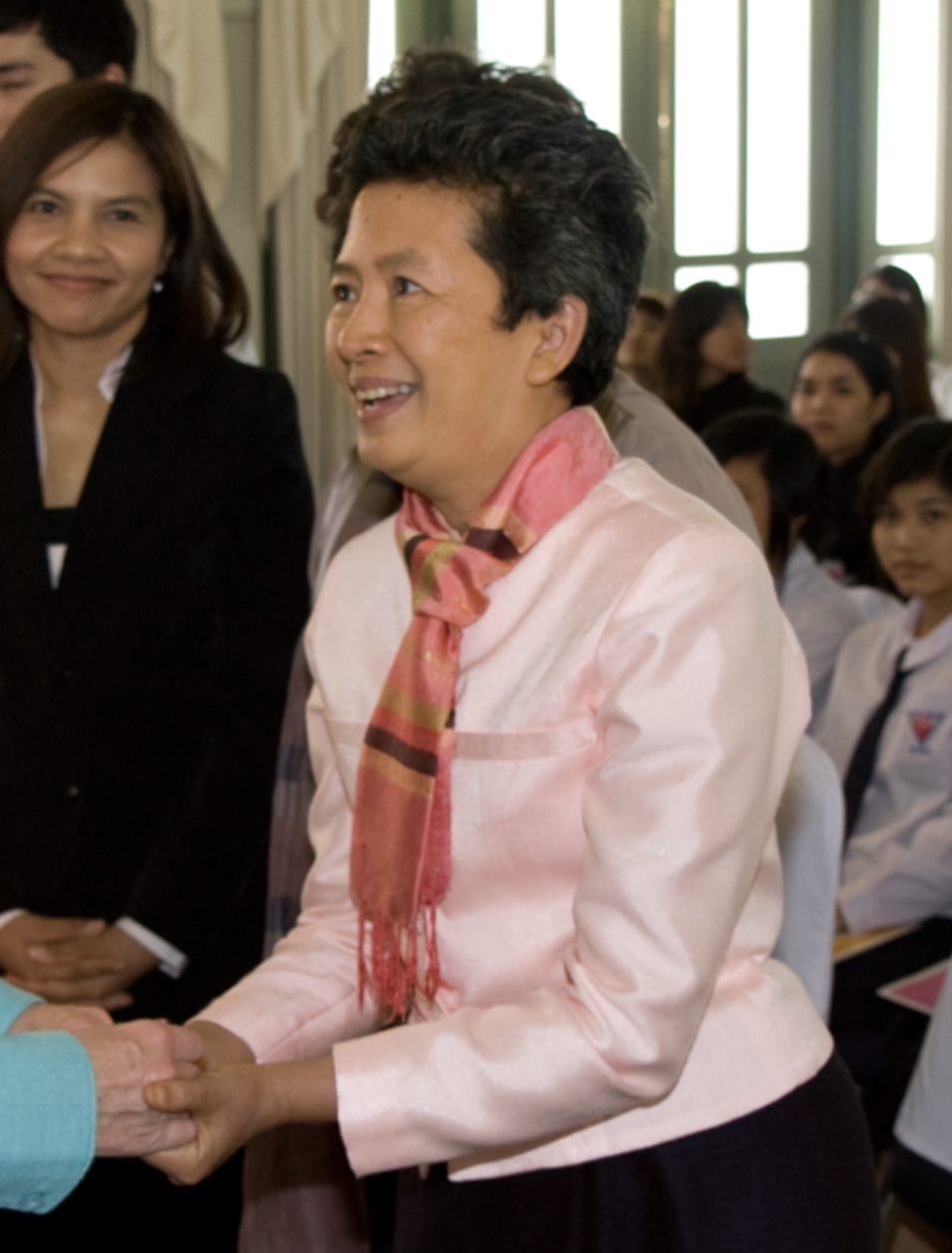
- Deetes in 2009
- Born: Tuenjai Kunjara na Ayudhya; 8 April 1952 (age 73); Thailand
- Spouse: Thanuchai Deetes
- Children: 2
- Parent(s): Khap Kunjara; Urai Peramatsathian

Tuenjai Deetes (Thai: เตือนใจ ดีเทศน์, RTGS: Tueanchai Dithet; born 8 April 1952), formerly Tuenjai Kunjara na Ayudhya (Thai: เตือนใจ กุญชร ณ อยุธยา, RTGS: Tueanchai Kunchon Na Ayutthaya), (Thailand) received the Global 500 Roll of Honour in 1992, and was awarded the Goldman Environmental Prize in 1994. Deetes has worked with Thai hill tribes since the early-1970s. She co-founded the Hill Area Development Foundation in 1986. She is a former commissioner of the Human Rights Commission until she resigned that post in July 2019.
