= Joanna Cariño =

Filipina human rights activist, educator, and researcher

Joanna Patricia Kintanar Cariño is a Filipina human rights activist, educator, researcher, and co-founder of the Cordillera People's Alliance (CPA), SELDA Northern Luzon (Association of Ex–Political Detainees against Detention and Arrest) and SANDUGO (Alliance and Movement of Bangsamoro and Indigenous Peoples and for Self-Determination).

== Early life ==
Cariño was born on May 2, 1951, in Baguio. A descendant of Ibaloi chieftain Mateo Cariño, she is the second eldest of eight children of Josefina Kintanar Cariño and Atty. Jose Cortes Cariño Jr.

Cariño attended Baguio Central School and Baguio City High School. In 1970, she left the University of the Philippines Baguio (UPB) and become an activist. Together with her younger sister Joji, she was illegally arrested, tortured, and detained in Camp Olivas from 1974 to 1976 during Martial Law under the dictatorship of Ferdinand Marcos. Her elder sister Jingjing had been killed in an accident that same year after becoming a full-time activist in 1974. In 1978, she resumed her schooling at UPB, where she graduated with a degree in Anthropology and Economics. She later took up graduate studies at the same university but subsequently left to further her career in activism.

== Human rights work ==
Cariño has been involved in the indigenous peoples' struggle to protect their ancestral lands and the environment. Cariño has opposed mining, logging, and dam projects that threaten to destroy ancestral lands in the Philippines.

She cofounded the Cordillera Peoples Alliance for the Defense of Ancestral Domain and Self–Determination (also known as Cordillera People's Alliance) in 1984 and has been a part of this organization ever since.

She is chairperson of Sandugo, which assists Philippine indigenous communities in their struggle for self-determination.

== Awards and recognition ==
On May 18, 2019, she was awarded with the Gwangju Prize for Human Rights for her activism and work against state violence. The Gwangju Prize for Human Rights is given to individuals, groups or institutions in Korea and abroad that have contributed to promoting and advancing human rights, democracy and peace through their work.
