= Korean Association of Bereaved Families for Democracy =

Organization

The Korean Association of Bereaved Families for Democracy (KABFD; Korean: 전국민족민주유가족협의회; Hanja: 全國民族民主遺家族協議會; RR: Jeongugminjogminjuyugajoghyeob-uihoe) is a South Korean human rights organization formed by surviving family members of those who died in the nation's democracy movement. The organization is particularly noted for its 1998-1999 sit-in before the Korean National Assembly demanding passage of the "Special Act on investigation of suspicious deaths", which was passed in December 1989. The Association's 422-day protest is generally viewed as a major contributor to the bill's passage.

== Award ==
In 2002, the group was awarded the Gwangju Prize for Human Rights of the May 18 Memorial Foundation. The prize recognizes "individuals, groups or institutions in Korea and abroad that have contributed in promoting and advancing human rights, democracy and peace through their work."
