= Dandeniya Gamage Jayanthi =

Sri Lankan political activist

- Occupation: Political activism
- Organization(s): Friends and Relatives of the Disappeared
- Known for: Work on forced disappearances
- Awards: Gwangju Prize for Human Rights (2003)

Dandeniya Gamage Jayanthi is a Sri Lankan political activist who focuses on the issue of forced disappearances in the 1980s and 1990s.

== Background ==
Jayanthi was one of ten children. Her father worked as a carpenter, and she and her siblings had to work throughout their childhood to earn money for their schooling and books.

After graduating, Jayanthi went to work in Katunayake, a Free Trade Zone surrounding Colombo's primary airport, Bandaranaike International. There she became engaged to Ranjith Herath, a worker in another factory who had repeatedly petitioned the government over allegedly abuse labor conditions in his plant. Jayanthi later described herself as very unpolitical at this time in her life, wishing only to earn a basic wage and start a family, and she repeatedly scolded Herath for his activism.

In 1989, Herath and his friend M. Lonel disappeared on their way to an inquiry with the management of his factory. The pair were found dead on 27 October in Raddoluwa junction, Seeduwa; they had been shot and then their bodies burned. One of Jayanthi's brothers was taken by police and shot later that year, and another brother disappeared in August 1990. When Jayanthi made persistent inquiries with police officials, she began to receive death threats and be followed by strangers. She finally chose to go into hiding, where she remained until 1992.

== Activism ==
Jayanthi went on to organize other relatives of disappeared persons into the group Friends and Relatives of the Disappeared. The group seeks to maintain interest in pursuing justice for these cases, as well as creating a public space where [survivors] can remember the dead", allowing families to speak openly of their experiences. In 2001, it erected a privately financed "Monument to the Disappeared", one of several planned. The group also seeks to provide financial support, scholarships, and other educational opportunities for the survivors of the disappeared. Over 1,000 disappeared people have now been registered with the group's database.

The group holds an annual ceremony for the disappeared on 27 October, the date that Herath and Lionel were found, in the junction in Seeduwa where their bodies were discovered.

In 2003, Jayanthi was awarded the Gwangju Prize for Human Rights of the South Korea-based May 18 Foundation, an annual award recognizing "individuals, groups or institutions in Korea and abroad that have contributed in promoting and advancing human rights, democracy and peace through their work".
