= Mun Jeong-hyeon =

South Korean Catholic priest (born c. 1941)

Father Mun Jeong Hyeon
- Born: c. 1941
- Occupation: Catholic priest
- Organization: Catholic Priests Association for Justice
- Known for: pro-democracy activism, anti-U.S. military protests
- Awards: Gwangju Prize for Human Rights (2012)

Rev. Bartholomew Mun Jeong Hyeon (Korean: 문정현; Hanja: 文正鉉, born c. 1941) is a South Korean Catholic priest. In the 1970s, he founded the Catholic Priests Association for Justice in opposition to the South Korean dictatorships that had killed pro-democracy activists. Since the 1980s, he has been a leading voice against the U.S. military presence in South Korea. In 2012, he was awarded the Gwangju Prize for Human Rights.

== Role in the democratization movement ==
Mun was an active participant in the 5.18 Democratization Movement, a popular uprising against President Chun Doo-hwan based primarily in the city of Gwangju. During the 1970s, Mun attended protests and founded the Catholic Priests' Organization for Justice in response to the government's killing of pro-democracy protesters. In 1976, he was jailed along with future president Kim Dae-jung. In 1986, he joined rallies and hunger strikes supporting the establishment of a democratic constitution.

== Opposition to U.S. military ==
Mun became one of the leaders of the anti-American movement in South Korea in the 1980s, describing the military presence as an "occupation force". The movement was at first small due to the country's conservatism and the association between anti-Americanism and communism, but grew into a mainstream movement over the following decades. When the Status of forces agreement between South Korea and the U.S. was being renegotiated in 1999, Mun led public action against it.

In December 2002, Mun spoke at a rally against the U.S. military presence after an armored vehicle operated by a U.S. soldier killed two South Korean teenage girls in the Yangju highway incident.

Mun also spent several years as a leader of the Daechuri Protests, a resistance movement in opposition to the expansion of Camp Humphreys, a U.S. Army garrison. The expansion tripled the base in size and forced a number of residents from their home villages. In 2005, a warrant was issued for his arrest following a large protest that led to clashes between demonstrators and riot police. Two years later, Mun acknowledged that it had become physically impossible to continue to block the expansion site—which was then guarded by South Korean soldiers and concertina wire—but maintained his belief that the activists' cause was "just" and that the U.S. military would someday have to leave South Korea.

Mun moved to Gangjeong Village, Seogwipo City, Jeju Province, in 2011 to live in solidarity with protesters against the construction of an ROK Naval base, which in his opinion will also be a U.S. Naval base in some way. In April 2012, he fell from a concrete tetrapod during a protest, fracturing several vertebrae.

== Gwangju Prize for Human Rights ==
Mun was awarded the Gwangju Prize for Human Rights on 18 May 2012, the first Korean individual to win the prize. The citation read:

The Catholic Priest Mun Jeong Hyeon has demonstrated his consistent commitment to peace and justice during his life time. His concerns have ranged from his involvement in fighting against the 1970's dictatorship where the authoritarian regime carried out extrajudicial killings, to the 1980's military junta, to the struggle against the navy base at Gangjeong, Jeju till this day. This member of the Catholic clergy has resisted against injustice and abuse of state power, while encouraging the socially disadvantaged and conducting environmental and peace movements.
