= Jatupat Boonpattararaksa =

Thai political activist (born 1991)

- จตุภัทร์ บุญภัทรรักษา
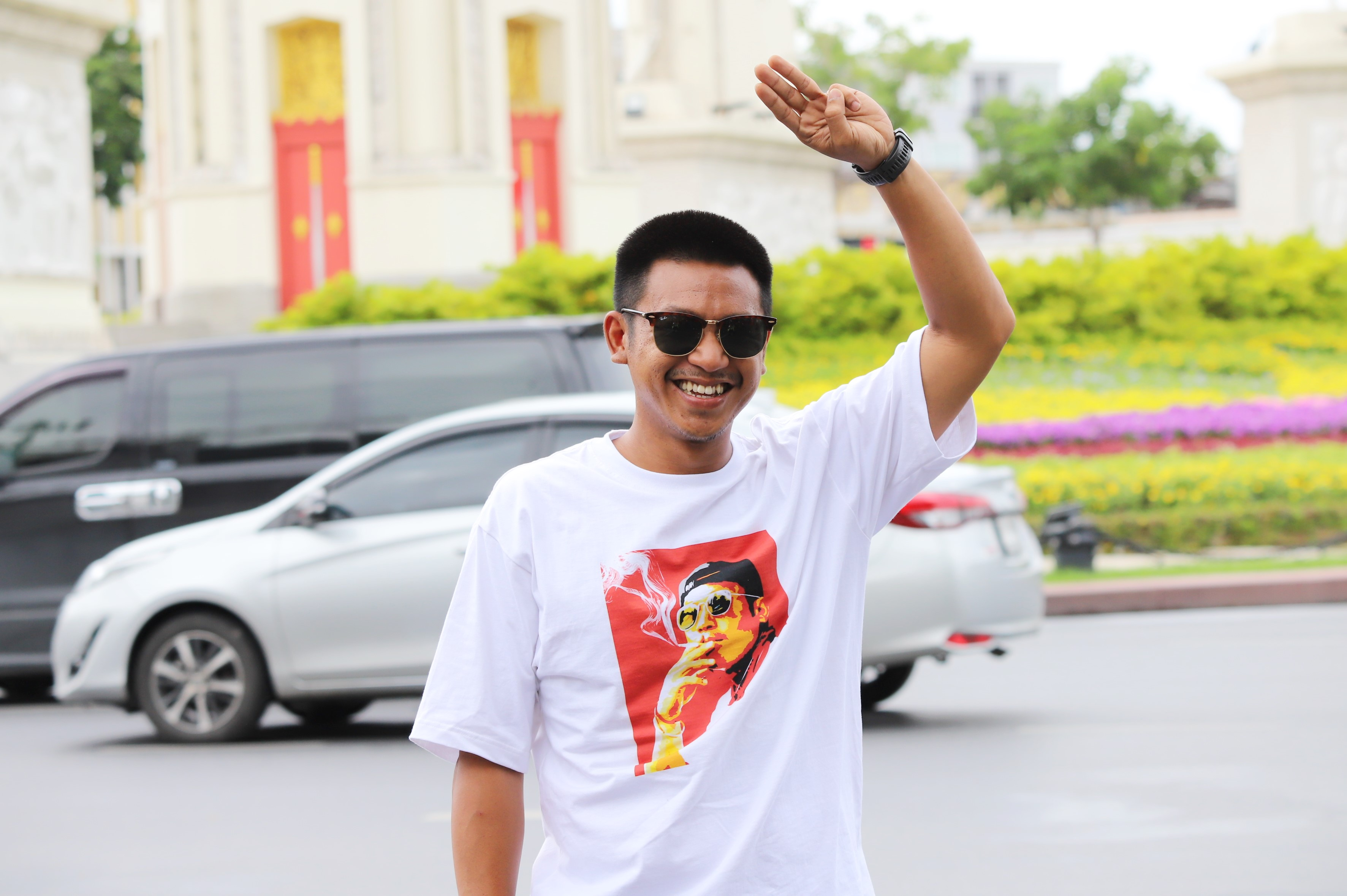
- Jatupat in 2021
- Born: 1 August 1991 (age 35); Phu Khiao, Chaiyaphum, Thailand
- Other name: Pai Dao Din
- Education: Khon Kaen University (LLB)
- Occupation: Activist
- Years active: 2013–2026

Jatupat Boonpattararaksa (Thai: จตุภัทร์ บุญภัทรรักษา), commonly known as Pai Dao Din (ไผ่ ดาวดิน; a combination of his nickname Pai and the student activist group Dao Din) is a human rights defender and activist from Thailand, who was arrested on 3 December 2016 on charges of Lèse-majesté in Thailand, the first such case under King Vajiralongkorn, following which he faced a secret trial and was then imprisoned. He has been charged and imprisoned multiple times, including for sedition, and most recently, on 9 March 2021, was charged and imprisoned for lese majesty a second time. Jatupat is presently affiliated with the Free People movement.

== Background ==
Jatupat is from Chaiyaphum, in Northeast Thailand. His father, Viboon Boonpattararaksa, is a community lawyer who has sought to represent villagers assassinated on social justice cases, such as protecting the environment. Prior to his arrest, Jatupat was a law student in Khon Kaen, at the Faculty of Law at Khon Kaen University. Jatupat teaches traditional Northeast Thai musical instruments to school students.

== Activism ==
Jatupat was politically active as part of the Dao Din Group and a founding member in 2015 of the New Democracy Movement. At university, in 2013–2014, Jatupat participated in anti-mining protests in Loei, during which he came to the public's attention when a photograph of him pleading with the authorities not to disperse a protest went viral. Subsequently, the Dao Din group was granted an award by Thailand's National Human Rights Commission, which Jatupat accepted on behalf of the group.

Following the 2014 coup, while the military junta (the National Council for Peace and Order; NCPO) was successfully repressing pro-democracy activists with diktats restricting freedom of expression, Pai and other Dao Din members peacefully protested Prime Minister General Prayut Chan-o-cha at a function in Khon Kaen by flashing the three-finger Hunger Games salute in front of him.

Jatupat was arrested alongside other members of the Dao Din Group on 22 May 2015 and detained; he was later released pending an investigation. On 6 August 2016, he was arrested for distributing flyers protesting the new draft charter, which was being put to a referendum, under Article 61(2) of the Referendum Act, which effectively penalised campaigning against the Charter. He went on hunger strike and was released on bail.

On 22 May 2017, for violating the NCPO Head's Order No. 3/2015 for participating in a gathering of over five people on 22 May 2015 to commemorate the May 2014 coup d’état, Jatupat was taken to the Military Court of Khon Kaen Province for trial together with seven other democracy activists.

In June 2017, Jatupat finished his bachelor's degree while being in prison.

== Arrest and imprisonment for lèse-majesté ==
Jatupat was accused of lèse majesté and was arrested on 3 December 2016 for "sharing" on his Facebook page a BBC Thai biography of King Vajiralongkorn as well as distributing material against Thailand's draft constitution. He was the first person to be arrested for lèse majesté during the new King's reign. While over 2,800 people shared the article on Facebook and it was read by millions, he was the only person to be arrested for lèse majesté.

After being bailed, Jatupat immediately posted a satirical Facebook message criticising the authorities. In a landmark bail hearing ruling, the court ruled that "the accused displayed behaviour via social media in a manner which ridiculed the authority of the state without fear of the nation’s laws, causing damage to the nation. The accused also had a tendency of acting in this way repeatedly." His bail was revoked on 22 December.

Jatupat initially pleaded innocent as he wanted to utilize his case to demonstrate to the public the injustices of the judicial process. However, after the court decided on a secret trial, in August 2017, he pleaded guilty and was sentenced to two and a half years in prison, on 16 August. Of the 2,600 persons who shared the biography online, Jatupat was the only one prosecuted. Several human rights groups have voiced outrage at the persecution of Jatupat and have initiated movements calling for justice. While in prison, Jatupat wrote poetry.

On 21 December 2017, while facing another charge related to holding an activity “Speaking for Freedom”, he testified at the military court at the Sripatcharin Camp of 23rd Royal Army Base while wearing his university graduation gown over his prison uniform.

On 7 January 2018, local villagers in Wang Saphung District, Loei Province, while issuing a statement regarding their struggle to protect the community and environment from gold mining, wore Jatupat masks in a show of solidarity.

He was released on 10 May 2019, shortly before the end of his term as the result of a royal pardon.

== Role in Parliament ==
After being released from prison, Jatupat became an official aide to MP Rangsiman Rome and had a role in Thailand's Parliament as Secretary of the Parliamentary Commission on Law, Justice, and Human Rights, and member of the Select Committee to Study and Solve the Problem of Infringement of Human Rights and Covert Harms to Citizens in affiliation with the Future Forward group. In this last role, he was able to face and publicly question his accusers as to why he had been charged.

== Renewed activism ==
On 28 August, as part of the 2020 Thai protests, Jatupat turned himself in following a protest that resulted in a police summons; he has been charged with sedition. On 17 September, police searched a house where Jatupat and fellow activists were staying and seized 17 banners intended to be used for the 19 September protest. Although police refused to let the activist group photograph the search warrant, Jatupat live-streamed the event.

Jatupat was again arrested on 13 October 2020. He was detained for questioning for up to 12 days and is facing 12 charges, while 19 fellow activists are facing 10 charges. On 19 October, Dusit Kwaeng Court granted Jatupat bail, together with 18 other protesters.

== Detained without bail for Lese Majesty, second incident ==
On 8 March 2021, Jatupat was again charged with lese majesty and imprisoned awaiting trial, along with protest leaders Panusaya Sithijirawattanakul (aka Rung) and Panupong Jadnok (aka Mike), for speeches they made on 19 September 2020, demanding reform of the monarchy. The three are in prison (as of 1 April 2021) and are not permitted to apply for bail.

== Awards ==
In 2017 Jatupat, while detained in a military court, was awarded the Gwangju Prize for Human Rights in recognition of his struggle against military dictatorship.

== Music videos ==
Jatupat sings and performs in the song and YouTube music video "คนที่คุณก็รู้ว่าใคร" ("You Know Who") with the band สามัญชน Commoner, released 3 February 2021, which draws attention to 9 assassinated Thai political dissidents. He is also featured in two other Thai protest music videos: in the song and YouTube music video "กล้ามาก เก่งมาก ขอบใจ" ("So Daring! So Talented! Thank You") (song by Paeng Surachet), with versions released on 5 December 2020, and 12 March 2021, after Jatupat was already in prison: and in the song/music video "ไม่มีคนบนฟ้า" ("There is No One in the Sky") by t_047, released 28 July 2021.

== Analysis ==
In 2017 Bangkok Post commentator Achara Ashayagachat described Jatupat as a role model for youth.

== See also ==
- Lèse majesté in Thailand
