= Human rights in Thailand =

Thailand was among the first countries to sign the United Nations' (UN's) Universal Declaration of Human Rights of 1948, and the country seemed committed to upholding the declaration's stipulations. However, the rights of Thai people within the country have historically been infringed, with offenders committing crimes with impunity. From 1977 to 1988, Amnesty International reported widespread human rights violations in the country; these included arbitrary detentions, forced disappearances, torture, and extrajudicial killings that were systematically investigated and covered up by the authorities. In the years since, Amnesty has demonstrated that this situation has changed little, and Thailand's overall human rights record remains problematic. A 2019 report by the NGO Human Rights Watch (HRW) expanded on Amnesty's overview by focusing specifically on Thailand. When the newly formed government of Prime Minister Prayut Chan-o-cha assumed power in mid-2019, Thailand's human rights record showed no signs of changing.

== History ==
In the Ayutthaya period (14th–18th centuries), slaves occupied the lowest rank in the social hierarchy known as sakdina. They were bound under servitude to a master who, according to the law, "had absolute power over their slaves other than the right to take their lives." People could become slaves through various means, including being taken as war captives, through debt, and being born into slavery. Masters' employment of their slaves varied, as was recorded by Simon de la Loubère, who visited Ayutthaya in 1687. The abolition of slavery in Thailand occurred during the reign of King Chulalongkorn through reforms implemented gradually over several decades; these reforms began in 1874, with a royal act stipulating that those born into slavery after 1868 were to be freed upon reaching the age of 21. A final act, issued in 1905, introduced progressively decreasing freedom-price caps and age limits, eventually ending the practice within the next few years. Slavery was explicitly criminalised by Section 269 of the 1908 penal code, which prohibited the sale and acquisition of slaves. Royal acts from 1911 to 1913 expanded the coverage of previous laws, and slavery legally ceased in Thailand in 1915.

The Siamese revolution of 1932 increased awareness of human rights; this reflected the influence of social democrat Pridi Banomyong, who introduced democracy and the first constitution of Thailand. The first article of this constitution stated that sovereign power belonged to the people of Siam, leading to the country's first election in 1937, with half of the parliament appointed by the nine-year-old King Ananda Mahidol's regent, Aditya Dibabha. Women also had the right to vote and stand for elections, and the first woman was elected to parliament in 1947.

From 1977 to 1988, as Amnesty reported, there "were at least 1,436 alleged cases of arbitrary detention, 58 forced disappearances, 148 torture [sic], and 345 extrajudicial killings in Thailand.... Thai authorities investigated and whitewashed each case."

Many new rights were introduced in the 1997 constitution. These included the right to free education; the protection of traditional communities; the right to peaceful protest; protections for children, the elderly, and the disabled; and the right to gender equality. Freedom of information, the right to public health and education, and consumer rights were also recognised. This constitution brought the total number of recognised rights up to 40, compared to the nine rights in the constitution of 1932. The 2007 constitution reinstated much of the extensive catalogue of rights explicitly recognised in the People's Constitution of 1997. That constitution outlined the rights to freedom of speech, freedom of the press, peaceful assembly, freedom of association, freedom of religion, and freedom of movement both within the country and abroad.

== Legal framework ==
=== International treaties ===
In 1948, Thailand was among the first nations to sign the UN's Universal Declaration of Human Rights. Thailand has been a party to the International Covenant on Civil and Political Rights since 1997, committing to protect domestic civil liberties and political rights.

=== Structure of domestic legal protection ===
The 2017 constitution, drafted by a body appointed by the National Council for Peace and Order (NCPO) – the military junta that came to power by coup in 2014 – states in Section 4: "The human dignity, rights, liberty and equality of the people shall be protected". This was unchanged from the 2007 constitution. Sections 25 to 63 of the 2017 constitution set out an extensive range of specific rights in such areas as criminal justice, education, non-discrimination, religion, and freedom of expression. Additionally, this constitution introduced the right to a healthy environment.

== Rights and liberties ratings by NGOs ==
In 2020, the annual survey and report Freedom in the World, by US-based Freedom House – which attempts to measure the degree of democracy and political freedom in every country – improved the rating of Thailand from Not Free to Partly Free. This improvement was due to a small decrease in limitations on assembly and strictly controlled elections that, despite significant shortcomings, ended a period of direct military junta. However, the country was downgraded again from Partly Free to Not Free for two reasons: the dissolution of a popular opposition party, the Future Forward Party, that had performed favourably in the 2019 Thai general election; and the military-dominated Prayut Chan-o-cha government's crackdown on the 2020–2021 Thai protests calling for democratic reforms. By 2021, the Monarchy and the authoritarian government worsened civil liberty by using a harsh lèse-majesté law against activists, in combination with a weaponized justice system, the constraining of freedom of expression, and a lack of freedom of association. The corruption index was also downgraded from 36 to 35, ranking Thailand 110th out of 180 countries.

Ratings of Thailand – by Freedom House, The Economist Intelligence Unit, and Transparency International
Year	Freedom House			The Economist Intelligence Unit		Transparency International
Report Ranking	Freedom in the World			Democracy Index (Note: Per The Economist Intelligence Unit 2010 ratings. Full democracies have an overall score of 10 to 8; flawed democracies have an overall score of 7.9 to 6; hybrid regimes have an overall score of 5.9 to 4; and authoritarian regimes have an overall score from 3.9 to 1. The extent of democracy is greater as the score increases.)		Corruption Perceptions Index (Note: According to the annual Transparency International Corruption Perceptions Index, the score ranges from 100 (very clean) to 0 (highly corrupt).)
	Freedom rating (Note: Per Freedom House 2021 ratings.) Free, Partly Free, Not Free	Political rights	Civil liberties	Democracy rating Full democracy, Flawed democracy, Hybrid regime, Authoritarian regime	Overall score	Political corruption perceptions
2019	Partly Free	6 / 40	26 / 60	Flawed democracy	6.32	36
2020	Not Free	5 / 40	25 / 60	Flawed democracy	6.04	36
2021	Not Free	5 / 40	24 / 60	Flawed democracy	6.04	35

== Equality ==
=== Racial ===
Racial discrimination is a prevalent problem in Thailand, but it is rarely discussed publicly. Thailand has made two submissions to the UN International Convention on the Elimination of All Forms of Racial Discrimination, with ongoing issues including government policy towards ethnic groups – especially the Thai Malays – and a lack of racial discrimination legislation.

=== Sex ===
To mark International Women's Day on 8 March 2020, Protection International and a network of Thai grassroots organisations handed the government its "Women's Report Card". The government failed in all major areas of rights protection. The assessment indicates that the government's promise to protect women's rights is not only perceived as empty, but that the state itself is believed to be the perpetrator of violence against grassroots efforts by Thai women. Thailand is obligated under the Convention on the Elimination of All Forms of Discrimination Against Women (CEDAW) to safeguard women's rights and to follow policy recommendations from the CEDAW committee to right wrongs. On 30 September 2020, 110 chief executives of Thailand-based companies signed the Women's Empowerment Principles by the UN, committing to gender equality, equal pay, and a safer workplace for women. The document was signed on the 10th anniversary of the Women's Empowerment Principles (WEP). The event was hosted by the WeEmpowerAsia programme.

=== Privacy ===
In late 2016, the Thai Hacktivist group accused the Thai military of buying decryption technology for monitoring messaging software and social network sites. In 2020, the security forces began using a facial recognition system linked to cellphones in southern Thailand; people who failed to register their phones were shut off from the system. Deputy Prime Minister Prawit Wongsuwan announced that the 8,200 security cameras operating in southern Thailand could be fitted with a facial recognition system and could be run with artificial intelligence (AI) in the future. In October 2020, a UN report accused the Thai military of spying on people using an AI-enabled CCTV system, collecting biometric information. The Thai military later denied this accusation.

In September 2021, Nattacha Boonchaiinsawat, an MP with the Move Forward Party, released videos, voice clips, and documents about military operations creating fake social media accounts to conduct information warfare against the people. The Internal Security Operations Command was also involved in deep monitoring of opposition politicians – seen as Prime Minister Prayut Chan-o-cha's political enemies – and Thai activists.

In late 2021, at least 17 activists in Thailand who were using Apple devices were warned by the company that they had been targeted by "state-sponsored" attackers. These activists included the following people:

- Panusaya Sithijirawattanakul and Arnon Nampa, who have called for reform of the monarchy
- Prajak Kongkirati, an academic at Thammasat University
- Puangthong Pawakapan, an academic at Chulalongkorn University
- Piyabutr Saengkanokkul, a prominent opposition politician
- Yingcheep Atchanont, of the legal rights non-profit iLaw

=== LGBTQ ===
Same-sex sexual activity is legal in Thailand for both men and women, but same-sex couples and households headed by them were historically ineligible for equal legal recognition. Since 2011, same-sex marriage laws have been proposed by LGBTQ groups. In 2021, the Constitutional Court ruled that the definition of marriage as solely between a man and a woman was constitutional. The verdict stated that members of the LGBTQ community cannot reproduce because it is against nature, and they are unlike other animals with unusual behaviours or physical characteristics. The ruling was deemed by some to be sexist and politically incorrect, and it enraged the LGBTQ community and rights defenders.

In June 2022, a group of bills that could legalise same-sex unions was passed by the lower house of the National Assembly. The most liberal of these bills, proposed by the Move Forward Party, would fully legalise same-sex marriage.

Same-sex marriage has been legal in Thailand since 23 January 2025.

=== Economic & social ===
In 2021, Prime Minister Prayut Chan-o-cha gave a definition of equality: the rich use an elevated toll road, and the poor use a road under it. He tried to build both ways, so that people could live in dispersion.

Craft breweries and microbreweries are illegal in Thailand, because Thai alcohol law has one of the strictest advertisement controls and large fines, which prevent small businesses from competing with large companies. In June 2022, craft breweries and microbreweries were unofficially decriminalised because the bill of Taopiphop Limjittrakorn – an MP in the Move Forward Party – passed the lower house.

== Freedoms ==
=== Freedom of expression ===
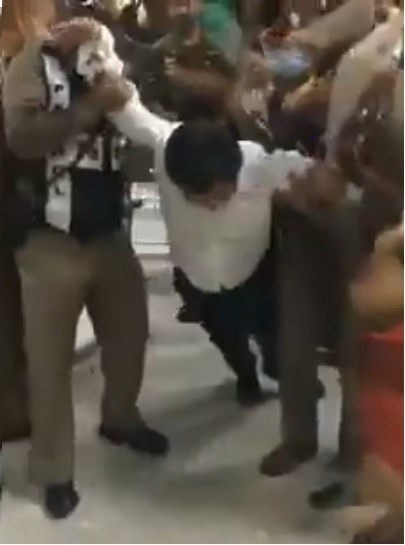
Arnon Nampa, human rights lawyer, being dragged by officers upon his first arrest in a series of peaceful protests in 2020.

Critics charge that the Thai criminal code's defamation provisions are de facto threats to free speech. Both the civil and commercial codes have provisions to deal with defamation, but plaintiffs often prefer to file criminal cases against activists or the press. Criminal charges can result in arrest, seizure of the accused's passport if they are a foreigner, and court proceedings that may last for years. These charges do not require the participation of police or government prosecutors, but can be filed directly with a court by the accuser; courts rarely reject these cases. Slander carries a maximum sentence of one year's imprisonment and/or a fine of up to 20,000 baht (US$600 as of 2022), while libel is punishable by up to two years in jail and/or a fine of up to 200,000 baht.

==== Freedom of the press ====
The Southeast Asian Press Alliance (SEAPA) noted that freedom of speech in Thailand's domestic media environment – before the 2006 coup, considered one of the freest and most vibrant in Asia – had quickly deteriorated following the military ousting of Thaksin Shinawatra. SEAPA noted the closure of community radio stations in Thai provinces, the intermittent blocking of cable news channels, and the suspension of some Thai websites devoted to discussing the implications of military intervention in Thai democracy. SEAPA also noted that while there seemed to be no crackdown on journalists – and foreign and local reporters seemed free to roam, interview, and report on the coup as they saw fit – self-censorship was certainly an issue in Thai newsrooms.

In 2018, British journalist Suzanne Buchanan reported on a series of tourist deaths and sexual assaults on the island of Ko Tao. Although she has not visited Thailand in years, she is wanted by Thai police, who say that she is peddling fake news. In 2022, she published a book on the subject called The Curse of the Turtle: The True Story of Thailand's Backpacker Murders (published by Wild Blue Press). In December 2019, Thai reporter Suchanee Cloitre was sentenced to two years in prison for a comment that she made about workers' grievances filed against one of the Thammakaset Company's poultry farms. In 2016, she posted a tweet in response to a court ruling – that the company pay 14 migrant workers 1.7 million baht in compensation and damages, on account of having to work 20 hours per day with no break for 40 consecutive days, at a wage less than the legal minimum. In her description of the ruling, the reporter used the term "slave labour" to describe the workers' employment. Thammakaset sued her and the workers for criminal defamation, but it lost the case against the workers. The court ruled that the reporter's choice of words misrepresented the facts and damaged the firm's reputation. In October 2020, HRW wrote a letter demanding the end of harassment of Cloitre. The joint letter was also signed by 12 other human rights organisations, calling on the Thai government to protect journalists and human rights defenders from insignificant criminal proceedings.

In October 2020, Thailand's Ministry of Digital Economy and Society announced an emergency decree to censor the outspoken channel Voice TV on all online media channels. The ministry accused the station of violating media restrictions – under the Emergency Decree on Public Administration in Emergency Situations and the Computer-Related Crime Act – during the channel's coverage of the domestic pro-democracy protests. In November 2021, the National Broadcasting and Telecommunications Commission (NBTC) office led by Lt Gen Peerapong Monakit, an NBTC commissioner, gave a warning to TV operators and concessionaires: they should carefully reconsider or even refrain from presenting content on some monarchy-related issues from the 2020–2021 Thai protests, in particular the 10-point monarchy-reform manifestos. Some media outlets saw the warning as intimidation, and fear of punishment may have left academics reluctant to express opinions on the monarchy. Analysts noted that this self-censorship could chill public debate on the issue entirely.

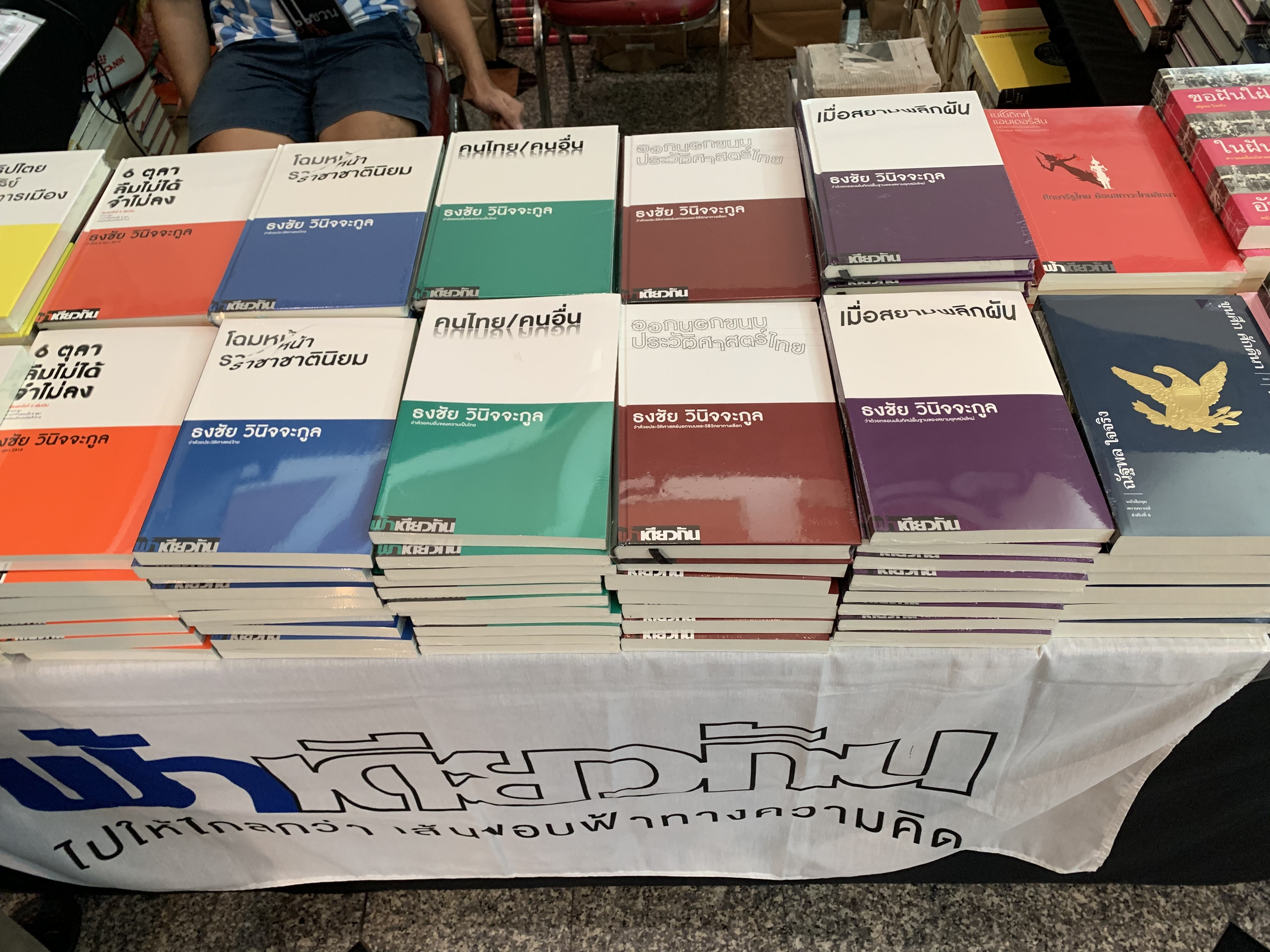
Books sold by Same Sky Books.

Thanapol Eawsakul, the owner and chief editor of Same Sky Books, was arrested by the Technology Crime Suppression Division police on 29 June 2022 for keeping a top-secret document. Thanapol had been harassed by Royal Thai Police officers several times since he founded a company that printed political books critical of the monarchy of Thailand.

==== Lèse-majesté ====
Lèse-majesté law in Thailand is a crime according to Section 112 of the Thai Criminal Code. This law makes it illegal to defame, insult, or threaten the king, queen, heir-apparent, heir-presumptive, or regent. Modern Thai lèse-majesté law has been on the statute books since 1908. Thailand is the only constitutional monarchy to have strengthened its lèse-majesté law since World War II. With penalties ranging from 3 to 15 years imprisonment for each charge, Thailand's law has been described as the "world's harshest lèse majesté law" and "possibly the strictest criminal-defamation law anywhere".

Anchan P. was given an 87-year prison sentence for uploading and sharing videos on the internet of an online talk show, after she had been detained in jail for nearly 4 years from 2015. In 2021, the court reduced her sentence by half to 43 and a half years because she pleaded guilty. The UN Human Rights Committee has declared that "imprisonment is never an appropriate penalty" for lèse-majesté cases.

On 21 May 2022, HRW reported that a pro-democracy activist, Tantawan "Tawan" Tuatulanon, had been detained and unjustly charged for peaceful protests. Tawan has advocated reforming the monarchy and abolishing draconian lèse-majesté. In addition, she started a hunger strike on 20 April 2022 to protest her pretrial detention. In 2023, Tawan and fellow prisoner Orawan "Bam" Phupong took part in a hunger strike to protest their imprisonment under the lèse-majesté laws. Both were in weak condition and had reportedly experienced chest pains and nosebleeds.

==== Law enforcement abuse of people ====
In November 2021, Yan Marchal – an 18-year French resident of Thailand – was deported to his homeland after mocking Prayut Chan-o-cha's Thai junta and the military-dominated government on the social media platform TikTok. He was stopped by immigration officials in Phuket after he had just arrived in Thailand from France. The reason given by the official was that Marchal's behaviour showed him as a possible danger to the public.

On 1 December 2021, a 28-year-old noodle vendor made headlines: she asked Prime Minister Prayut Chan-o-cha to retire quickly to allow others to perform the duties, and she stated that Thailand needs much development, while the prime minister was being welcomed by people in the Ban Dung district of Udon Thani province. Later, Ban Dung police visited her house, asking to see her so that they could keep a record of her; however, she declined to meet them, saying that she had done nothing wrong. The police later denied this story.

==== Assaults on activists ====
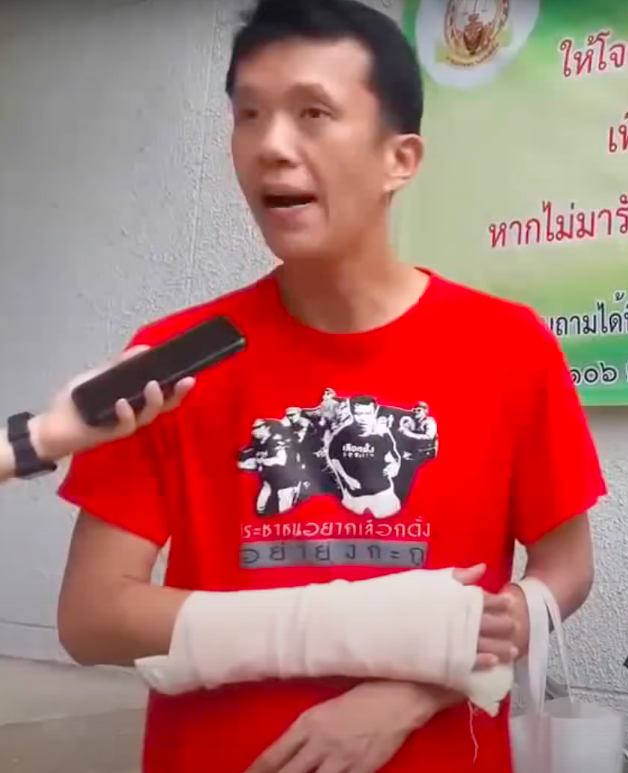
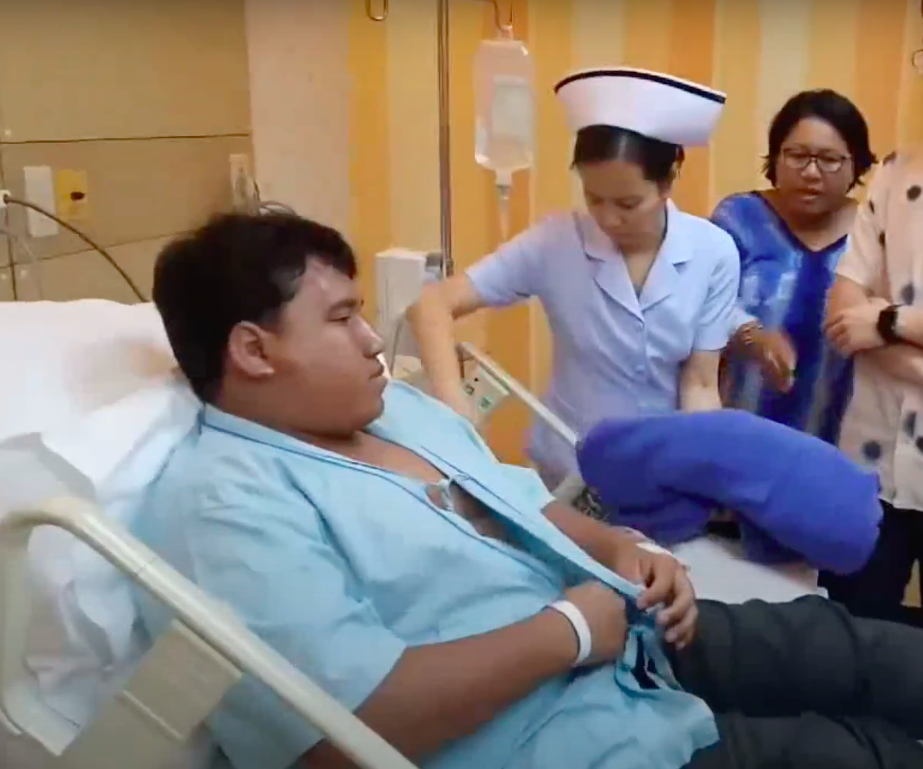
Thai activist Ekachai Hongkangwarn (left) gives an interview with his arm broken from an assault. He has been assaulted seven times since 2017. Sirawith Seritiwat (right), alias Ja New, was assaulted and hospitalised in 2019.

Between 2018 and 2019, there had been 11 physical assaults on political activists in Thailand. Police investigations of the assaults have shown no progress.

Regime critic Ekachai Hongkangwarn has been assaulted seven times since 2017. Attacks have targeted his property and his person. The latest assault took place in May 2019, when he was beaten by four attackers in front of a court building. Authorities appear powerless to stop the attacks. One culprit was arrested in 2018, paid a fine, and was released.

On 28 June 2019, anti-junta activist Sirawith "Ja New" Seritiwat was attacked by four assailants wielding baseball bats on a busy Bangkok thoroughfare. Earlier in June, Sirawith was attacked by five men when travelling home from a political event. In the case of the latest attack, the deputy prime minister broke the government's silence on political attacks and ordered the police to act swiftly to find the attackers.

==== Forced disappearances ====
According to Amnesty International Thailand, at least 59 human rights defenders have been victims of forced disappearance since 1998. The Bangkok Post counts 80 confirmed disappearances and likely murders since 1980. A report compiled in 2018 by the Thai Lawyers for Human Rights Centre showed that at least 86 political refugees left the country as a consequence of the 2014 coup d'état. The government of Prime Minister Prayut Chan-o-cha continues to refuse to criminalise torture and enforced disappearances.

Human rights advocates across Asia fear that Southeast Asian countries – Thailand, Vietnam, Malaysia, Cambodia, and Laos – have jointly agreed to cooperate in two ways: capturing political activists who have fled their own countries, and returning them to their home countries without due process to face torture and possible death. The Bangkok Post has noted that disappearances began to occur after the Thai and Lao governments agreed in December 2017 to cooperate in tracking down persons deemed "security threats".

Among those who disappeared are the following people:

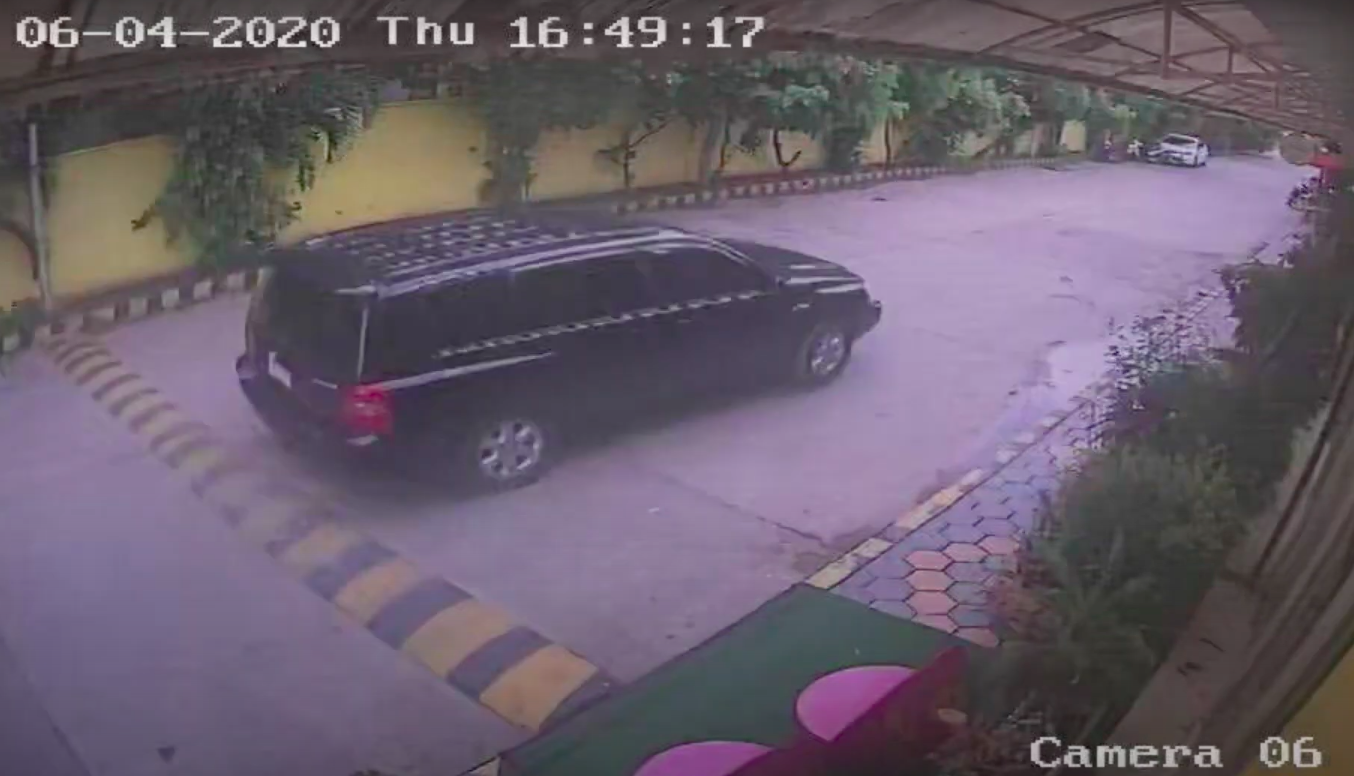
Wanchalearm Satsaksit was abducted in a black van in 2020.

- Haji Sulong, a reformist and a separatist who disappeared in 1954. He sought greater recognition for the Jawi community (Thai Malays) in Patani province.
- Tanong Po-arn, a Thai labour union leader who disappeared after the 1991 Thai coup d'état by the National Peace Keeping Council against the elected government.
- Somchai Neelapaijit, a human rights attorney who championed the rights of Thai Malay Muslims in the deep south. He was abducted and killed in 2004 during the Thaksin Shinawatra administration. His body was never found, and no one has been punished.
- Porlajee "Billy" Rakchongcharoen, a Karen-ethnic activist, who was murdered and whose remains were later discovered.
- Den Khamlae, a villager turned activist.
- Ittipon Sukpaen – an anti-monarchist in Laos and 28-year-old pro-democracy broadcaster known as DJ Zunho – was kidnapped on 22 June 2016 by unknown assailants and pulled into the woods. He was never seen again.
- Wuthipong Kachathamakul, also known as Ko Tee, a red shirt activist, disappeared in July 2017.
- Surachai Danwattananusorn, also known as Surachai Sae Dan, a radical red shirt activist and critic of the monarchy, along with two aides – Chatchan "Phoo Chana" Boonphawal and Kraidet "Kasalong" Luelert. Surachai's family, a year after his disappearance, was still being held liable for 450,000 baht in bail bond fees by the Thai court system. As of 2019, the Thai police still considered Surachai a "missing person". They had failed to make progress on the case, and the Thai government "...seems to have ignored these cases..."
- Siam Theerawut, Chucheep Chiwasut, and Kritsana Thapthai – three Thai anti-monarchy activists – went missing on 8 May 2019. They are thought to have been extradited to Thailand from Vietnam around that time, after attempting to enter Vietnam with counterfeit Indonesian passports. The trio are wanted in Thailand for insulting the monarchy and failing to report when summoned by the junta after the May 2014 coup. Their disappearance prompted an "alert statement" from the Thai Alliance for Human Rights. Their disappearance passed the one-year mark on 8 May 2020 with no sign yet of the trio.
- Od Sayavong, a Lao refugee and critic of the Laotian government, disappeared from his Bangkok home on 26 August 2019; he has not been seen since then.
- Wanchalearm Satsaksit, an exile who left Thailand after the 2014 coup, first to Laos and then to Cambodia. He was abducted in Phnom Penh on 4 June 2020 in broad daylight by several men. The Cambodian authorities initially refused to investigate the case, calling it "fake news". These authorities relented on 9 June, saying that they would investigate, while denying any responsibility. The case has galvanised numerous groups into action on Wanchalearm's behalf. In June 2020, The Diplomat news reported allegations from multiple sources, including journalist Andrew MacGregor Marshall, that Wanchalearm's abduction had been ordered by Thai King Vajiralongkorn and overseen by Jakrapob Bhuridej, who was described as the king's security chief. In 2026, Marshall further alleged that Jakrapob had overseen the operation, together with his brother Jiraphop "Kong" Bhuridej, chief of the Crime Suppression Division of the Royal Thai Police.

According to the legal assistance group Thai Lawyers for Human Rights, at least 86 Thais left Thailand seeking asylum abroad after the military takeover in May 2014. Among them are the five members of the Thai band Faiyen. Their crime is their music, because some songs mock the monarchy, which is a serious offence in Thailand. The band, whose name means "cool fire", announced on social media that its members feared for their lives after "many trusted people told us that the Thai military will come to kill us." In August 2019, the band members were admitted to France seeking refugee status. All of those who disappeared in late 2018 and early 2019 were accused by Thai authorities of anti-monarchical activity.

==== Arbitrary arrest and detention ====
Since the beginning of 2021, prominent human rights defenders and democracy activists have been charged with possibly more than 100 years each on criminal charges for involvement in pro-democracy activism. The leading figures of the 2020–2021 Thai protests that called for reforms to the monarchy – Arnon Nampa, Panupong Jadnok, Parit Chiwarak, Jatupat (Pai Dao Din), Panusaya (Rung), and Benja Apan – were all detained awaiting trial in 2021, in a series of detainments and releases. Some of these figures were imprisoned cumulatively for more than 200 days, after Prime Minister Prayut Chan-o-cha issued a declaration in November 2020 charging protesters with offences under all laws, including lèse-majesté.

In 2022, there were multiple cases of systematic harassment and detention against young monarchy-reform activists. An example was the case of Tantawan Tuatulanon, who protested her imprisonment by going on a hunger strike for 37 days. Most activists who mentioned the monarchy were also forced to wear electronic monitoring anklets by the criminal court. More than 15 dissidents are still imprisoned.

==== Political abuse of psychiatry ====
On 9 July 2020, Tiwagorn Withiton – a Thai political and human rights activist – was forcibly carried out of his home by a group of six officers and driven to a hospital. In the car, the officers tied his hands with a cloth and injected him with an unknown medication. The police searched his house, and they took his computer and smartphone; they also made his mother sign a consent form for bringing him to be admitted to Rajanagarindra Psychiatric Hospital in the city of Khon Kaen. Hospital director Nattakorn Champathong explained that Tiwagorn had not been forced to enter the hospital. Khon Kaen's police chief, Major General Puttipong Musikul, explained that he was receiving treatment because his relatives had him admitted.

=== Freedom of association ===
In the wake of the 2006 and 2014 coups d'état, the rights to free speech, association, and freedom of movement were seriously eroded. Military governments have implemented bans on political meetings and prohibited media criticism. Political activities of all types were prohibited. The Public Assembly Law, enacted in 2015 by the military government, requires a protest notice to be filed with authorities 24 hours before an event. A violation carries a maximum fine of 10,000 baht. Since its enactment, this law has been repeatedly invoked by authorities to suppress gatherings.

==== Elections, political parties, and representation ====
For the 2019 Thai general election, the military junta government failed to make arrangements for a free and fair national election, according to HRW. The procedure for forming a new government, in which 250 military-appointed Senators have half the total number of votes for the government as the elected House of Representatives, severely undermines the right of Thai citizens to choose leaders. Moreover, the electoral process included several problems:

- Repressive laws restricting freedom of speech, association, and assembly
- Media censorship
- Unequal access to the media
- Lack of independence and impartiality in the national election commission.

This lack of independence and impartiality led to the dissolution of a major opposition party, the Thai Raksa Chart Party, for which King Vajiralongkorn prohibited the Thai princess Ubol Ratana from entering politics. In addition, HRW stated that the junta disregarded Article 25 of the International Covenant on Civil and Political Rights (ICCPR).

On 20 November 2019, the court convicted Thanathorn Juangroongruangkit, disqualifying him from MP status. On 21 February 2020, the Future Forward Party was dissolved by the Constitutional Court. Amnesty International stated that this dissolution violated the rights to freedom of expression and association, and HRW condemned it for seriously damaging the return to genuine democratic rule.

==== Attitude adjustment ====
Since the 2014 Thai coup d'état, the National Council for Peace and Order (NCPO) has made full use of martial law to prosecute opponents, ban political activity, and censor the media. More than 1,000 people – including academics, political bloggers, activists, and politicians – have been detained or sent for "attitude adjustment" at military installations. Allegations of torture have been made. Prosecutions under the country's strict lèse-majesté laws, which protect the monarchy from insult, have risen sharply. The victims said that they were removed from their houses and detained at a military base. Renowned dissidents – such as Yingluck Shinawatra, Watana Muangsook, Pravit Rojanaphruk, and Karun Hosakul – have been abused by the NCPO since the coup. Deputy Prime Minister Prawit Wongsuwan told reporters that "If they speak so 100 times, they will be summoned 100 times." Prawit added that "attitude adjustment" can last between three and seven days.

==== Peaceful protests ====
On 6 December 2021, the Royal Thai Police arrested more than 50 villagers from the Chana District who came for a sit-in near the government house. These villagers were protesting against plans for an industrial park in the "Southern Economic Corridor".

=== Freedom of religion ===
Although Thailand describes itself as a Buddhist state, all religious groups have the freedom to practice and maintain communal institutions in the country. The constitution prohibits discrimination based on religious belief and protects religious liberty, so long as the exercise of religious freedom does not harm national security. Thai law prohibits the sale of alcohol on Buddhist holidays because such sale would violate the fifth of the Five Precepts, the basic Buddhist code of ethics. As of 2020, the Muslim community in the Deep South of Thailand continues to express frustration with perceived discriminatory treatment by security forces, as well as what they described as a judicial system lacking adequate checks and balances.

==== South Thailand insurgency ====
Problems have been reported in the country's southern provinces, relating to the South Thailand insurgency. Approximately 180 people are reported to have died there while in custody during 2004. In a particularly high-profile case, Muslim human rights lawyer Somchai Neelaphaijit was reportedly harassed, threatened, and finally forcibly disappeared in March 2004 following his allegations of torture by state security forces. In 2006, Prime Minister Thaksin Shinawatra stated that he believed that Somchai was dead and that state security forces appeared to be responsible. Five policemen were eventually charged in Somchai's death, though the trial resulted in only one conviction, which was overturned on appeal in March 2011. The verdict was denounced by the Asian Human Rights Commission, and Somchai's wife, Angkhana, declared her intention to continue appealing the case to the Thai Supreme Court. Since 2007, a number of suspected insurgents in custody have died, some with suspicious injuries.

In late 2019, three young woodcutters were murdered by Thai troops in Bo-ngo Subdistrict, Ra-ngae District, Narathiwat Province. The government initially claimed that the killings occurred in a clash between paramilitary Rangers and terrorists. Later, the Human Rights Protection Committee – appointed by the Fourth Army Area Commander – concluded that soldiers mistook the dead men for terrorists and killed them as they were running away. Families of the deceased pointed out that the young men possessed only woodcutting tools. Images of the dead men on social media showed that each was shot in the head – two of them sitting cross-legged on the ground, leaning forward. The Commander of the Fourth Army Area issued an apology and a compensation payment of 500,000 baht for each death, and he transferred the responsible commander of the 45th Ranger Forces Regiment elsewhere.

The suicide of Khanakorn Pianchana, a Thai judge, in October 2019 called for improvement in the justice system in the Muslim community in the deep south. Judge Khanakorn told the accused, five Muslims, and their family members that he wanted to acquit them due to lack of evidence, but that he was being forced from higher levels to convict.

From January 2004 to June 2020, Pattani, Yala, and Narathiwat Provinces, along with four districts of Songkhla Province, suffered at least 20,323 violent incidents; these resulted in at least 6,997 deaths and 13,143 casualties, 61% of whom were civilians.

=== Right of asylum ===
Human rights NGOs consider Thailand "...a place that's no longer safe for refugees." Since the 2014 Thai coup d'état, Thailand has sent 109 Uighurs back to China, and a further 52 Uighurs have been detained for approximately five years. Gulenists have been refouled to Turkey and others to repressive regimes in the Middle East.

Vietnamese journalist Truong Duy Nhat has been detained in Hanoi (as acknowledged by Vietnamese authorities) after being picked up on 26 January 2019 in Bangkok, shortly after filing for refuge with the United Nations High Commissioner for Refugees (UNHCR). Thai authorities are being pressured to investigate Thai police involvement in the abduction and detention of Nhat, according to Amnesty.

==== Burmese refugees ====
Burmese refugees in Thailand can remain in one of the refugee camps along Thailand's border with Burma, which protect them from arrest and summary removal to Burma, but they lack the freedom to move or work. Alternatively, they can live and work outside the camps, but typically without any recognised legal status, leaving them at risk of arrest and deportation. From 2005 to 2011, more than 76,000 Burmese refugees were resettled from border camps to third countries, though the total number of camp residents has remained at about 140,000.

Refugees who venture out of the camps are regarded by the Thai government as illegal aliens and are subject to arrest. Thai police or paramilitaries regularly apprehend camp residents and take one of two actions: return them to camp if the refugees pay sufficient bribes, or send them to one of Thailand's immigration detention centres and then deport them to Burma. Refugees in the camps are subject to abuse and exploitation at the hands of other refugees. Refugees working as camp security – as well as camp leaders and camp residents with hidden connections to ethnic armed groups inside Burma – wield power in the camps.

== Justice system ==
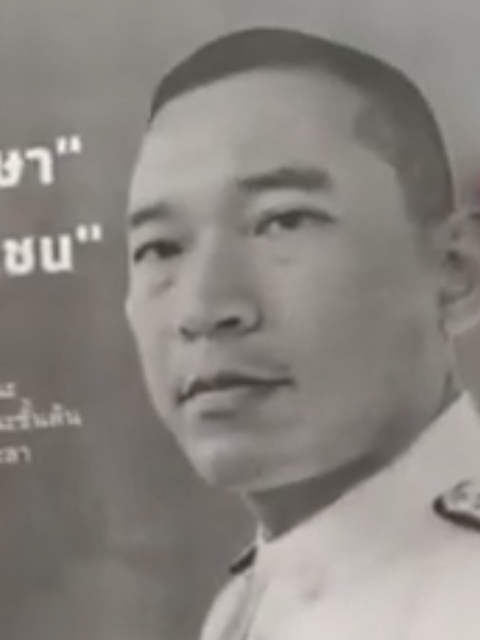
A mourner at Chiang Mai University, holding a sign showing Khanakorn's selfie and his quotation "Bring back the judge his verdict. Bring back the citizens their justice."

Thailand has serious problems with its justice system, including the judiciary. This situation is reflected in the suicide of Khanakorn Pianchana: he was a Thai judge who attempted suicide in October 2019 to protest against interference in the judicial system; he died in a second, fatal attempt in March 2020, after being subject to investigations following his actions. At the time of his first suicide attempt, he was a senior judge in the Yala Provincial Court in southern Thailand.

=== Judicial harassment ===
==== Thai government ====
On 19 February 2016, the deputy national police chief, General Sriwara Rangsipramanakul, publicly intimidated Chuchart Kanpai, threatening to prosecute him for insulting and making false statements; these stated that Bilal Mohammad (Adem Karadag), his client, was tortured into confessing to the 2015 Bangkok bombing at the Erawan Shrine.

In late 2017, Arnon Nampa, a human rights activist, criticised the court for punishing his group of clients by restricting them from seeing each other. He said that the court had no right to order this restriction. On 5 December, he was charged with contempt of court and violating the Computer Crime Act by Lieutenant Colonel Supharat Kam-in. Arnon denied all charges and believed that it was politically motivated against exercising the right to freedom of expression. Human rights NGOs demanded that the military junta stop strategic lawsuits against public participation (SLAPPs). The organisation Front Line Defenders condemned the military junta for judicial harassment of Arnon, firmly believed that it was linked to his duties as a human rights lawyer, and demanded that the junta drop all charges against him.

==== Business sector ====
The Office of the UN High Commissioner for Human Rights (OHCHR) raised serious concerns about abuses of the judicial system by a business, Thai poultry producer Thammakaset, to intimidate and silence human rights defenders exposing the company's exploitative and abusive labour practices. This may create a 'chilling effect' on human rights defenders and journalists, and encourage other businesses to do the same, particularly against women. The Human Rights Council pressured Thailand to address abuses of the judicial system and protect human rights defenders. Angkhana Neelaphaijit is another human rights defender.

In February 2013, the Thai pineapple company Natural Fruit filed four civil and criminal lawsuits against Andy Hall for computer crimes and defamation, including a civil defamation lawsuit for 300 million baht. Hall reported to the Finnish NGO Finnwatch about serious labour abuses at the factory in Prachuap Khiri Khan province. He also gave an interview to the television network Al Jazeera about this report. The report is titled Cheap has a high price: Responsibility problems relating to international private label products and food production in Thailand, including allegations of underpaid wages, child labour, distraint of migrant workers' documents, and failure to provide legally required labor leaves.

=== Torture ===
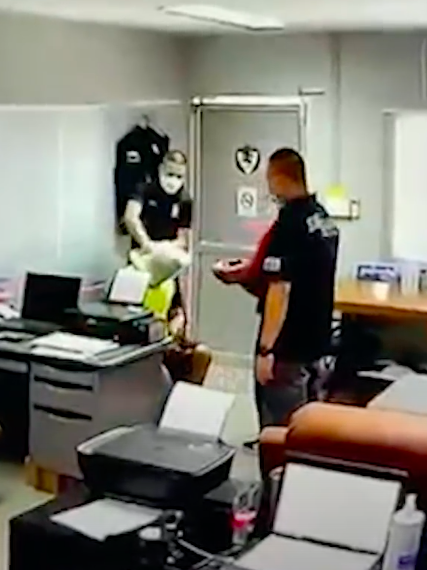
CCTV footage in a Thai police station posted online appears to show the suspect being ordered to pay $60,000 to have charges dropped before he is suffocated to death with a plastic bag.

The Constitution of Thailand prohibits acts of torture, but the country's legal system does not define torture, and torture is not recognised as an offence by this system.

In a report titled "Make Him Speak by Tomorrow": Torture and other Ill-Treatment in Thailand, which was planned for formal release in Bangkok on 28 September 2016, Amnesty International accused the Thai police and military of 74 incidents of brutality. An Amnesty press conference to unveil the report was halted by Thai authorities, who cited Thai labour laws prohibiting visiting foreigners from working in Thailand. The three foreign speakers were as follows: Rafendi Djamin, Amnesty's director for Southeast Asia and the Pacific; Yubal Ginbar, a lawyer working for Amnesty; and Laurent Meillan, acting Southeast Asia representative for OHCHR. The Thai government denied the torture allegations. The government's spokesman, General Sansern Kaewkamnerd, emphasised that "Our investigations into such allegations have shown no indication of torture, I have seen no indication of torture and the Thai people have seen no indication of torture..." Jeremy Laurence, a representative of OHCHR, had been scheduled to speak at the press conference. He said, "This incident is another striking illustration of a new pattern of harassment of human rights defenders documenting torture in Thailand".

Thailand has been a signatory to the United Nations Convention against Torture since 2 October 2007. Section 28 of the Thai 2016 constitution states that "A torture, [sic] brutal act or punishment by cruel or inhumane means shall be prohibited."

A bill to prevent torture and enforced disappearance was scheduled to be presented before Thailand's National Legislative Assembly (NLA) in late December 2018. The bill would criminalise torture and enforced disappearances, including during wars and political unrest. The draft law specified that the Department of Special Investigation (DSI) would be responsible for investigating cases of enforced disappearance and torture. Only in events where DSI officials were accused of such crimes would police be assigned to investigate. Imprisonment for 5 to 25 years, and/or a fine of 100,000 to 300,000 baht, would be imposed on guilty parties. If the bill became a law, every government agency restricting people's rights would be required to maintain a database of people whose rights were restricted, the actions taken, and the disposition of their cases.

On 5 August 2021, the Thai police assaulted Jeerapong Thanapat, a 24-year-old drug suspect, during interrogation to force him to reveal hidden methamphetamines and pay a bribe of two million baht (or US$61,000) for his release. The video appears to show the superintendent of the Muang Nakhon Sawan Province police station – Thitisan Utthanaphon, widely known by the nickname "Jo Ferrari" – and other police officers suffocating Thanapat with plastic bags until he collapsed and died. The police reportedly ordered doctors at Sawanpracharak Hospital to write in a medical report that the cause of Jeerapong's death was a methamphetamine overdose. In June 2022, Thitisan was convicted of the suspect's killing and sentenced to life in prison.

=== 2003 war on drugs ===
The government's anti-drug war in 2003 resulted in more than 2,500 extrajudicial killings of suspected drug traffickers. Prison conditions and some provincial immigration detention facilities are characterised as poor. In 2004, more than 1,600 people died in prison or police custody, 131 as a result of police actions.

Summary executions occurred. Their innocent victims included the following people:

- A 16-month-old girl who was shot dead along with her mother, Raiwan Khwanthongyen
- Daranee Tasanawadee, a pregnant woman who was killed in front of her two young sons
- Jirasak Unthong, an 8-year-old boy who was the only witness to the killing of his parents
- Suwit Baison, 23 years old, a cameraman for a local television station. Suwit fell to his knees in tears in front of Thaksin Shinawatra and begged for an investigation into the killing of his parents. Both parents had been shot dead as they returned home, Suwit said.

Suwit added that ten other people in his neighbourhood had been killed after surrendering to the police.

Surayud Chulanont, the junta's prime minister, vowed to right Thaksin's wrongs. HRW says that the panel's original report named the politicians who encouraged the gunmen. However, after the People's Power Party (PPP) won the 2007 elections, those names were omitted.

== Human trafficking ==
Human trafficking is a major issue in Thailand. This trafficking includes deceiving and kidnapping men from Cambodia, and then selling them to illegal fishing boats that trawl the Gulf of Thailand and the South China Sea. These men are promised better-paid jobs, but instead they are forced to work as sea slaves for as long as three years. Numerous international news organisations, including The Guardian, Associated Press, and The New York Times, have extensively covered the topic; Associated Press, in particular, has won prominent awards for its coverage (although not without controversy for overstating its role in combating trafficking). Child trafficking is another major issue in Thailand, with forced kidnapping of children as young as four to use as sex slaves in major cities such as Bangkok and Phuket. Such activities are especially common in rural areas of Thailand.

Instances of forced labour in the fish and shrimp industry – as well as child labour in the pornography industry – are still observed in Thailand and have been reported in two sources: the 2013 US Department of Labor's report on the worst forms of child labour, and the 2014 List of Goods Produced by Child Labor or Forced Labor.

Paween Pongsirin, a high-ranking police officer who was investigating human trafficking in Thailand, sought asylum in Australia in 2015. After investigating many high-profile and high-ranking police and army officers, he fled to Singapore out of fear of reprisal from the authorities, and from there he entered Australia.

== Military conscription ==
Conscription was introduced in Thailand in 1905. According to the Constitution of the Kingdom, serving in the armed forces is a national duty for all Thai male citizens. However, it has disregarded human rights in the military; each year, reports of abuse, torture, and killing against draftees are common. A violent punishment called "repair" (Thai: ซ่อม) in Thai military culture caused 11 conscript deaths between 2009 and 2018. In 2017, Deputy Prime Minister and Defence Minister Prawit Wongsuwon stated that a lack of empathy for victims was common in Thai military culture.

In a report issued in March 2020, Amnesty charged that Thai military conscripts face institutionalised abuse that is systematically hushed up by military authorities. According to Amnesty, the practice has "long been an open secret in Thai society". One of the most infamous cases was in 2011, when ten officers tortured Wichian Pueksom to death. To date, there is still no verdict for the officials.

== Children's rights ==
=== Child prostitution ===
Thailand has an unfortunate reputation for being a centre of child sex tourism and child prostitution. Even though domestic and international authorities work to protect children from sexual abuse, the problem persists in Thailand and many other Southeast Asian countries.

=== Child abuse ===
Child abuse often goes unnoticed in Thailand, except when the victim is raped or becomes pregnant. Incest and paedophilia cases in Thailand have been taken lightly, reflecting a famous Thai proverb, "Their personal family matter, we don't mess."

In October 2021, a well-known music producer, Jakkawal 'Neung' Saothongyutitum, posted many times on the social media platform Instagram. In these posts, he was seen clowning around with his nine-year-old daughter and touching her buttocks; hugging and rubbing her belly with both his arms under her shirt; and rubbing near her crotch area. Jakkawal later explained that he was scratching this at the request of the child. There was a public uproar because of the sexual nature of these posts; these were mentioned more than 1.84 million times after a video of one of the incidents was released on TikTok. Jakkawal had not been charged with any crime, and he was denied access to counselling after this incident.

In December 2025, a North Dakota man, Sean David Snyder, was accused of having travelled to Thailand and sexually abused two children in Phuket between 2018 and August 2025. The children told the FBI that they knew Snyder, and that he began abusing them when they were younger than eight years old, according to court documents. He faced one count of possession of materials containing child pornography, three counts of travel with intent to engage in illicit sexual conduct, and three counts of engaging in illicit sexual conduct in foreign places. According to prosecutors, the FBI told Snyder that his passport had been revoked in October 2025.

== Government attitude toward NGOs and activists ==
In 1976, Thai police, military personnel and others were seen shooting at protesters at Thammasat University. Many protesters were killed, and many survivors were abused.

In early 2021, the Thai government led by Prime Minister Prayut Chan-o-cha adopted a draft law, the Draft Act on the Operations of Not-for-Profit Organizations, to regulate non-governmental organizations (NGOs). The bill was mentioned by Amnesty as an effort to pass repressive legislation to silence civil society groups and NGOs.

In November 2021, Prayut's government started an investigation into whether Amnesty International Thailand (AITH) had broken any laws; this occurred after ultra-royalists called for AITH to be expelled for supporting pro-democracy activists, such as Panusaya (Rung), who was facing prosecution on royal defamation cases. Because of the strict laws against insulting the monarchy, more than 1,600 activists were charged under security laws, including at least 160 people charged with a potential prison term of up to 15 years. Prayut had assigned the Ministry of Interior and the Royal Thai Police to investigate this matter. Meanwhile, the People's Alliance for Democracy (known as Yellow-Shirts), pro-government groups, rallied in front of the Silom Complex in Bangkok; their goal was to gather up to one million signatures to support a campaign to expel AITH from Thailand.

== See also ==
- Lèse-majesté in Thailand
- Censorship in Thailand
  - Internet censorship in Thailand
- Constitution of Thailand
- LGBT rights in Thailand
