= Somyot Prueksakasemsuk =

Thai activist and magazine editor (born 1961)

- สมยศ พฤกษาเกษมสุข
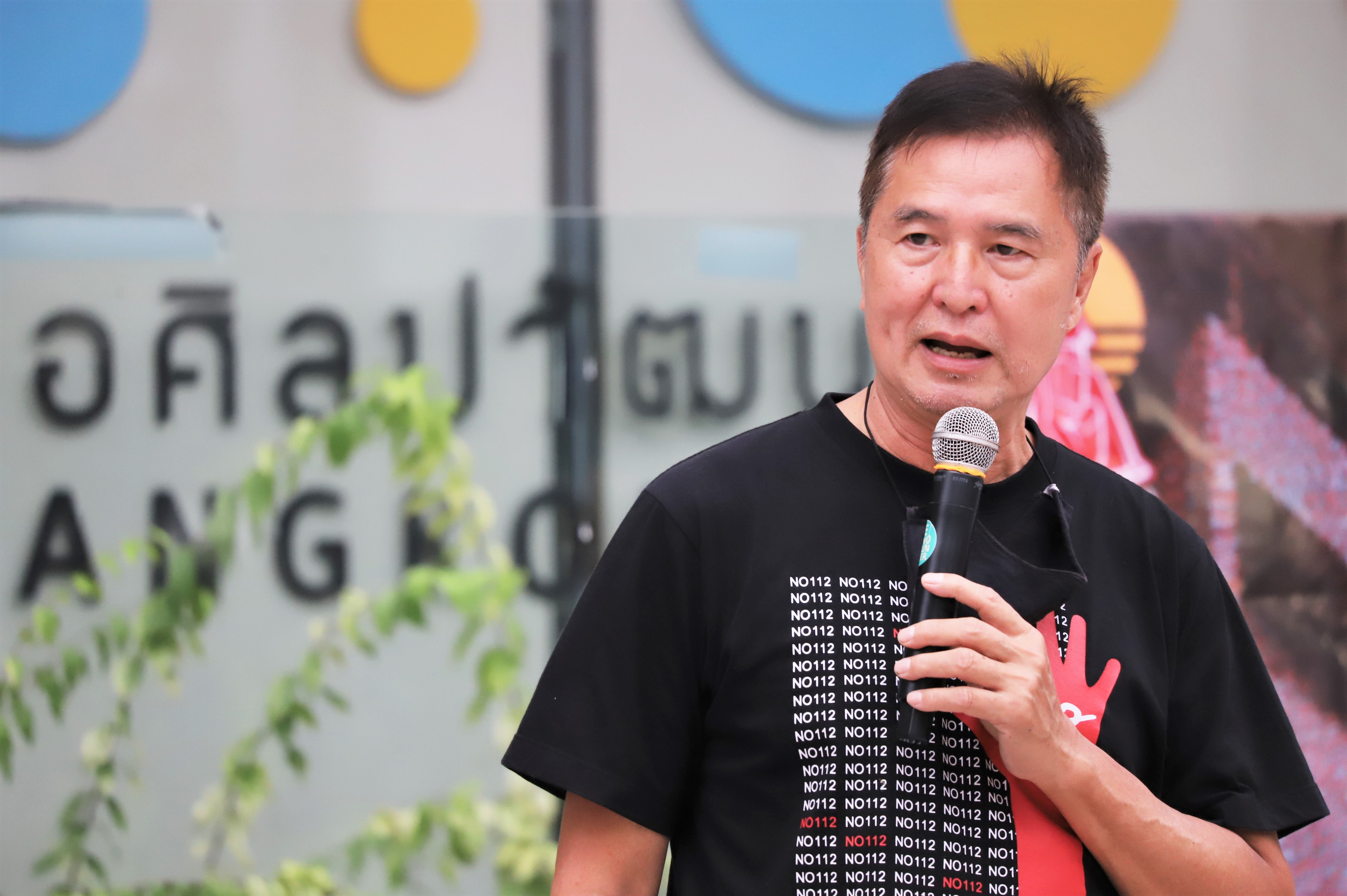
- Born: 9 November 1961 (age 64); Bangkok, Thailand
- Education: Ramkhamhaeng University
- Occupations: Activist; magazine editor
- Known for: Prisoner of conscience (2013 Thai lèse-majesté conviction)

Somyot Prueksakasemsuk (Thai: สมยศ พฤกษาเกษมสุข; born 9 November 1961) is a Thai activist and magazine editor who was sentenced to eleven years of imprisonment for lèse-majesté against King Bhumibol Adulyadej in 2013. His sentence drew protest from the European Union and from numerous human rights groups, including Amnesty International, which designated him a prisoner of conscience. He was an editor of the Voice of Thaksin (Voice of the Oppressed) magazine and a prominent labour rights activist affiliated with the Democratic Alliance of Trade Unions who protested for Thai labour law reform.

== First lèse majesté incident ==
Somyot is a member of the "red shirts", a movement supporting former prime minister Thaksin Shinawatra; Thaksin was removed from power in 2006 by a coup d'état. In 2010, Somyot, then the editor of the magazine Voice of Thaksin, published two articles critical of a fictional character interpreted by the court as representing King Bhumibol Adulyadej. He was not the author of the two articles. Somyot was arrested for lèse majesté on 30 April 2011, five days after launching a grassroots campaign to collect ten thousand signatures for a petition that called for reform of the lèse majesté law.

Somyot was arrested and imprisoned without bail for nearly two years. On 23 January 2013, the Criminal Court of Thailand convicted him of lèse majesté and sentenced to a total of eleven years in prison: one year for a suspended sentence for a defamation charge, and five years each for the two counts of violating Article 112, the lèse majesté law. The judge stated: "The accused is a journalist who had a duty to check the facts in these articles before publishing them. He knew the content defamed the monarchy but allowed their publication anyway". Somyot's lawyer said following the verdict that Somyot would appeal, adding: "I can confirm that he did not intend to violate Article 112 ... He was doing his job as a journalist."

The judge in Somyot's case was Chanathip Mueanphawong (ชนาธิป เหมือนพะวงศ์), who has presided over many lèse majesté cases, including the case of Ampon Tangnoppakul or "Uncle SMS" in which the judge sentenced Ampon to twenty years in prison; the case of Surachai Danwattananusorn, who was sentenced to imprisonment for five years and six months; and the case of Chiranuch Premchaiporn, who was given a suspended sentence of one-year imprisonment on grounds of failing to remove lèse majesté comments on her website.

=== International reaction ===
The verdict came at a time when Thailand's lèse majesté laws were becoming increasingly controversial domestically and internationally. Thai activists and human rights groups stated that the laws were disproportionately used to imprison "red shirts" and other political opponents of the government. Prior to the trial, an alliance of human rights organizations lobbied for the dismissal of the charges against Somyot, including Amnesty International, Freedom House, the International Federation for Human Rights (FIDH), and the World Organisation Against Torture (OMCT). Amnesty International called Somyot a "human rights defender" and designated him a prisoner of conscience, imprisoned "simply for peacefully exercising his right to freedom of expression". The Asian Human Rights Commission argued that the lèse majesté law itself was unconstitutional in Thailand, protesting a Constitutional Court decision to uphold it.

A delegation of the European Union criticized the verdict in Somyot's case, stating that it "seriously undermines the right to freedom of expression and press freedom". Human Rights Watch stated that "The courts seem to have adopted the role of chief protector of the monarchy at the expense of free expression rights". Reporters Without Borders called the verdict an "affront to media freedom".

The court's chief judge, Thawee Prachuablarb, defended the sentence: "There have been criticisms, rather one-sided, that the court was too harsh in its judgement but the five-year prison term for each of the two counts is considered appropriate ... It is mid-way between the minimum sentence under this law, which is three years, and the maximum punishment of 15 years. The court made its ruling in accordance with the law."

=== Release from prison ===
Somyot Prueksakasemsuk finished his sentence and was released from prison on 30 April 2018. In interviews, he said that he had lost his family and his job as a result of the lèse majesté charge, and that at one point in jail, after developing gout due to wounds from his shackles, he had attempted suicide. Immediately upon his release, he vowed to go back to fighting for democracy: "Participating in political activities is a civic duty. . . . I will join with any movement that demands elections. That's surely a good thing."

== Demanding justice for disappeared and assassinated political dissidents ==
Somyot was active in efforts to seek justice for a series of disappeared and assassinated lèse-majesté refugees who had been living in countries neighboring Thailand. After Surachai Danwattananusorn (also known as Surachai Saedan), Chatchan Boophawan, and Kraidet Leulert disappeared on 13 December 2018, and the mutilated bodies of two of the men were subsequently found, Somyot, together with Surachai’s widow, Paranee Danwattananusorn, sent a letter to Thailand’s National Human Rights Commission dated 5 March 2019 calling for an investigation into the enforced disappearance of Surachai Danwattananusorn and the group assassinated."RE: Calling for Investigation into the Enforced Disappearance of Surachai Danwattananusorn and the Group Assassinated". Thai Alliance for Human Rights. 5 March 2019. On 8 May 2019, three additional Thai refugees with a similar background disappeared, reportedly after being captured in Vietnam while traveling with fake passports."Thailand: Critics Feared 'Disappeared'". Human Rights Watch. 9 May 2019. Somyot helped Kanya Teerawut, mother of one of the disappeared, Siam Teerawut, to campaign for his return, without success. Following the reported abduction of Thai political refugee Wanchalearm Satsaksit in Phnom Penh, Cambodia, Somyot was again at the forefront of calls for an investigation and justice for the disappeared dissident."A Thai Dissident Was 'Kidnapped' in Cambodia. Protesters and the UN Want Answers". Vice. 16 June 2020.

== Further arrests for sedition and lèse-majesté ==
On 16 October 2020, Somyot was arrested again under Article 116 of the Thai Criminal Code (sedition) in relation to a speech delivered at a political rally on 19 September 2020.""Arrested activist Somyot predicts victory for pro-democracy protesters"". The Nation. 23 October 2020. He was released from custody on 3 November 2020."4 pro-democracy protesters released from temporary detention". Prachatai English. 3 November 2020."Voice of "Somyot", he was locked up again after spending seven years in jail previously, "It feels even more painful"". Thai Lawyers for Human Rights. 23 November 2020.

On 9 February 2021, he was arrested once more over the same 19 September 2020 speech, this time on lèse-majesté charges.""Prominent Activists Held in Pre-Trial Detention"". Human Rights Watch. 9 February 2021. He was granted bail on 23 April 2021."Activists Somyot, Pai Dao Din walk free on bail". Bangkok Post. 23 April 2021.

== Awards ==
In 2016, Somyot Prueksakasemsuk won the 24th Jeon Tae Il special Labour Award by the Jeon Tae Il Foundation.
