= Nithiwat Wannasiri =

Thai academic and political activist

- นิธิวัต วรรณศิริ
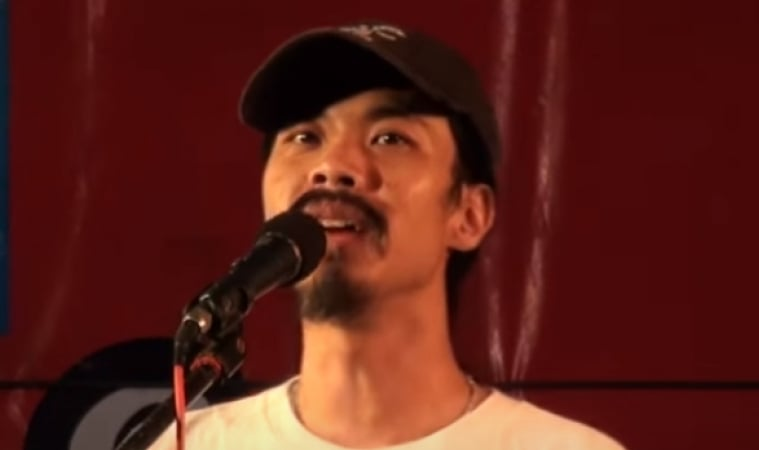
- Jom in 2020

De-facto Deputy Leader of Faiyen and Organization for Thai Federation
- Incumbent
- Assumed office 23 March 2022
- Leader: Trirong Sinseubphon (Khuntong)
- Preceded by: Trirong Sinseubphon (Khuntong)

Personal details
- Born: 18 October 1986 (age 40) Nonthaburi, Thailand
- Citizenship: Thai (revoked in 2015); Laotian (until 2019); French (since 2019)
- Party: Pheu Thai Party (until 2014); French Communist Party (since 2019)
- Occupation: Musician, Political activist
- Nickname: จอม (Jom)

Military service
- Branch/service: Royal Thai Army
- Years of service: 2007 - 2008 (Active); 2008 - 2015 (Reserve)
- Rank: Lance corporal (Active); Sergeant (Reserve)

Nithiwat Wannasiri (Thai: นิธิวัต วรรณศิริ; October 18, 1986 –), widely known by his nickname "Jom" (จอม) or "Jom Faiyen" (จอม ไฟเย็น), is a Thai political activist, singer, and musician. He is a prominent member and lead vocalist of the band "Faiyen" (ไฟเย็น), a hybrid political band blending pop, rock, luk thung, and phleng phuea chiwit (songs for life) styles. The band is recognized for its outspoken criticism of military dictatorship, Thai politics, and the monarchy content that has led to severe legal and personal risks for its members. He is currently De facto Deputy Leader of Faiyen and Organization for Thai Federation since 22 March 2022.

== Early activities and Post-2014 Exile ==
Faiyen was founded around 2011 initially with Wat Waralyangkun as a key early figure and became increasingly active after the 2014 military coup in Thailand. The group's music and live streams openly challenge authoritarianism and discuss sensitive political topics, including direct commentary on the institution of the monarchy, which is heavily restricted under Thailand's lèse-majesté law (Article 112 of the Criminal Code).

Following the 2014 coup, several Faiyen members including Nithiwat were summoned under NCPO (National Council for Peace and Order) Order 5/2557 to report themselves. When they refused, military courts issued arrest warrants for Nithiwat and others on charges related to non-compliance. Facing potential arrest and prosecution particularly under lèse-majesté laws, Nithiwat and other band members fled into exile, first to Laos around 2014–2015, where they continued producing music and online content despite ongoing fears for their safety amid a series of disappearances and murders of Thai dissidents in neighboring countries.

== Current activities ==
In 2019, due to escalating threats including the high-profile disappearances and confirmed killings of exiled activists, Nithiwat and several Faiyen members relocated to France. There, they successfully sought and obtained political asylum/refugee status. Nithiwat has remained in France since then, continuing political activism through daily live streams, music releases, social media commentary often under pages such as "จอมไฟเย็น ปฏิกษัตริย์นิยม", podcasts, and public statements criticizing the Thai government and monarchy.

Notable events in his exile include:

- Surviving a physical assault in Paris in 2019 or 2020 (along with Aum Neko), which went to trial in France.
- Ongoing involvement in Faiyen's "Faiyen Channel" on YouTube, which broadcasts political discussions and music to advocate for democracy and change in Thailand.
- Promoting Liberal democracy, extreme decentralization, and Welfare state.
