= Murder of Porlajee Rakchongcharoen =

2014 murder in Phetchaburi, Thailand

Billy Rakchongcharoen
- Born: Porlajee "Billy" Rakchongcharoen
- Disappeared: 17 April 2014; Phetchaburi, Thailand
- Status: Missing for 12 years, 6 months and 12 days

Porlajee "Billy" Rakchongcharoen (Thai: พอละจี "บิลลี่" รักจงเจริญ) was a Karen environmental and community activist who was last seen alive in Kaeng Krachan National Park, western Phetchaburi Province, Thailand on 17 April 2014. He was arrested at a park checkpoint by park superintendent Chaiwat Limlikit-aksorn and four of his men for alleged illegally collecting wild honey in the forest. Three years earlier, in 2011, Billy had filed a lawsuit against Chaiwat over the May 2011 destruction and burning of houses, and eviction of over 20 Karen families living in Jai Paen Din, meaning 'heart of the land' in the park's Pong Luk Bang Kloy village, in the Huai Mae Phriang Sub-district of Kaeng Krachan District. The national park chief later swore that Billy had been arrested and released on the same day after being questioned for possession of an illegal wild bee honeycomb and six bottles of honey. There are no official records of his arrest or detention. Following Billy's supposed arrest he was never seen alive again. Searches conducted from April–August 2019 discovered human bone fragments in the Kaeng Krachan Dam reservoir. DNA tests of the fragments matched those conducted on Billy's mother, leading the Department of Special Investigation (DSI) to conclude that the bones were Billy's and that he had been murdered. Chaiwat, the former park chief, immediately cast doubt on the DNA test, saying, "...this [DNA test result] is not enough proof to conclusively say the skull fragment is Billy's,..." Chaiwat and others had been charged with Billy's murder but were cleared due to insufficient evidence. Chaiwat was however sentenced to 3 years in prison for dereliction of duty for not reporting the arrest of Rakchongcharoen.

== Background ==
Kaeng Krachan forest has been the ancestral home to tribes of ethnic Karen peoples. Billy's village was shown on military maps dating from 1912, long before the forest became a national park in 1981. In 1979, the Thai government designated areas of the forest as "protected", forcing the Karen to leave their homes. Authorities insisted that the Karen crop rotation system was a threat to the forest ecosystem. Chaiwat called the villagers recent invaders, a haven for smugglers, and a threat to national security. In May 2011, Kaeng Krachan National Park officers forcibly evicted and burned about 100 houses and rice barns of Karen villagers in Pong Luk Bang Kloy. The evictions occurred the same year the forest agency moved to list the Kaeng Krachan Forest Complex as a UNESCO World Heritage Site. On 11 September 2011, Phetchaburi local activist and former Pheu Thai candidate Thatkamon Ob-om, 55, was shot dead while driving. He had been active in helping the Karen people who were evicted. As a result, had been banned from entering the park for causing unrest and impeding development. Thatkamon had accused Chaiwat of forest encroachment and backed a forest dwellers lawsuit against the park superintendent. Chaiwat was charged with murder, but was freed for lack of evidence.

== Investigation and legal proceedings ==
Shortly after Billy's disappearance, his wife, Pinnapha Phrueksapan, requested that the court hold an emergency trial under Article 90 of the Criminal Procedure Code to investigate his alleged unlawful detention. The Court of First Instance ruled that evidence of the unlawful detention of Billy was insufficient. Royal Thai Police Region 7 investigators filed charges in early–2015 under Article 157 of the Criminal Code, "malfeasance in office", against Chaiwat and four other park officers for the alleged unlawful detention of Billy.

After two years, the investigation of Billy's disappearance had made no progress. Thailand has no forced disappearance laws, so Karen villagers filed a lawsuit against the alleged perpetrators for unlawfully detaining the activist. On 17 April 2016, at Kaeng Krachan District Police Station, Phetchaburi Province, villagers from the Karen Network for Culture and Environment filed a complaint against Chaiwat Limlikit-aksorn, former Superintendent of Kaeng Krachan National Park. He and his four colleagues were alleged to have been involved in the disappearance of Porlajee. The case is under investigation by several agencies, but no progress has been made on the case.

In June 2018 the Supreme Administrative Court reaffirmed that ethnic Karen villagers cannot return to their homes in Kaeng Krachan National Park. Their houses were burned down by park officials in 2011. The court noted that villagers did not have ownership documents for the land they were evicted from making them ineligible to claim ownership or return to live there. The villagers argued that their families had lived in the park for over a century, long before the forest was made a national park in 1979. The court did find former park chief Chaiwat Limlikit-aksorn guilty of malfeasance for torching over 100 Karen houses. He was ordered to pay damages of 50,000 baht on average to each of the six plaintiffs within 30 days of the ruling.

On 28 June 2018, the Department of Special Investigation (DSI) announced that it will re-open the investigation into Billy's disappearance. Media reports intimated that the DSI's change of heart was due to pressure on the Prayut Chan-o-cha administration from international organizations regarding a case that was initially ignored, leading the media to doubt DSI's newfound commitment. The Bangkok Post called DSI's newfound interest in the case, "...a ceremonial move to appease international human rights defenders." Earlier in June, the Supreme Administrative Court found former park official Chaiwat guilty of malfeasance for setting fire to more than 100 Karen houses in the park. He was ordered to pay compensation of about 50,000 baht per house to six plaintiffs. In the same ruling, the court said the displaced ethnic Karen could not return to their homes in the park because they did not possess property deeds. The International Commission of Jurists (ICJ), an international human rights non-governmental organisation, on 26 July 2018, urged the DSI to expedite their latest investigation. The ICJ charged that the case was moving at a "glacial pace" before the DSI accepted it.

Seeing justice done in Billy's case may prove elusive. Thailand does not have a law on enforced disappearances which would hold accountable the person last seen with the victim. In 2018, the junta-appointed National Legislative Assembly defeated a bill against torture and enforced disappearance.

== Timeline ==
Date	Event
May 2011	Destruction of Karen village and relocation of residents to Bang Kloy Lang village in the national park.
11 Sep 2011	Phetchaburi local activist and former Pheu Thai candidate Thatkamon Ob-om, 55, was shot dead while driving. He had been active in helping the Karen people who were evicted. As a result, had been banned from entering the park for causing unrest and impeding development. Thatkamon had accused Chaiwat of forest encroachment and backed a forest dwellers lawsuit against the park superintendent. Chaiwat was charged with murder, but was freed for lack of evidence.
17 Apr 2014	Porlajee disappeared on 17 April 2014 after being detained Kaeng Krachan National Park chief Chaiwat for allegedly harvesting wild honey. He had been assisting Karen villagers of Pong Luk Bang Kloy file a lawsuit against Chaiwat in the Administrative Court for allegedly ordering the eviction of Karen villagers and burning Karen homes in May 2011.
16 Sep 2014	An emergency trial request was submitted by Phinnapha Phrueksaphan, Billy's wife, to the Appeals Court after the Court of First Instance ruled earlier that evidence of the unlawful detention of Billy was insufficient.
29 Jan 2015	Royal Thai Police Region 7 investigators file charges under Article 157 of the Criminal Code (malfeasance in office) against Chaiwat and four other park officers for the alleged unlawful detention of Billy.
27 Feb 2015	Appeals Court dismisses a request to hold an emergency trial under Article 90 of the Criminal Procedure Code to investigate the alleged unlawful detention of Billy, citing lack of evidence.
14 Jan 2016	The Sub-Committee on Civil Rights of the National Human Rights Commission (NHRC), meets to review progress in the case. The lead investigator testifies that the testimony of Kaeng Krachan National Park officers who detained Billy was "inconsistent". Police post a 200,000 baht reward for information.
17 Apr 2016	At Kaeng Krachan District Police Station, villagers from the Karen Network for Culture and Environment file a complaint against Chaiwat Limlikit-aksorn, a suspect in the forced disappearance of Porlajee Rakchongcharoen.
3 May 2016	Chaiwat Limlikit-aksorn, the prime suspect in the forced disappearance of Porlajee Rakchongcharoen, is promoted to head a new Department of National Parks, Wildlife and Plant Conservation (DNP) forest and wildlife protection unit called the "Tiger Corps Operation Unit".
7 Sep 2016	The Thai Administrative Court rules that national park officers did not break the law in burning the houses of members of the Karen ethnic minority in Kaeng Krachan National Park.
2017	The Department of Special Investigation (DSI) ruled that Billy's wife could not petition the department on grounds that she was not legally married to Billy. DSI also stated that the investigation could only proceed if his body is found, highlighting Thailand's lack of a forced disappearance statute.
17 Apr 2018	The investigation of Chaiwat Limlikit-aksorn has been pending with the Public Sector Anti-Corruption Commission (PACC) since 2014 with no progress in the case.
30 Jan 2017	The DSI said it will not investigate the forced disappearance of Porlajee "Billy" Rakchongcharoen. The case is now solely in the hands of regular police.
18 Apr 2018	The Justice Ministry denies that no progress has been made in the case. The ministry "needs more information" to decide whether to refer the case to the Department of Special Investigation (DSI). The Public Sector Anti-Corruption Commission (PACC) is investigating why officers released Billy without charge. The Special Investigation Board is waiting for information from the PACC before it considers whether to accept the case as "special".
28 Jun 2018	The DSI announced that it will re-open the investigation of Billy's disappearance.
26 Apr 2019	The DSI employs experts from King Mongkut's University of Technology North Bangkok to use underwater submersibles to search for human remains under a bridge in the park reservoir. Bone fragments are found during the search.
22–24 May 2019	Police divers find more bone fragments.
Jul 2019	A committee of the UNESCO World Heritage Site deferred inscribing Kaeng Krachan National Park as a world heritage site over human rights concerns. Earlier, UNESCO reps visited the area following a petition by Karen people to deny recognition until the Thai government addresses their status and concerns.
28–30 Aug 2019	The Central Institute of Forensic Science matches the bone fragments found with samples taken from Billy's mother, leading the DSI to conclude that the bones are Billy's and that he was murdered.
4 Sep 2019	Billy's chief official antagonist, Chaiwat Limlikit-aksorn, former chief of Kaeng Krachan National Park, insisted in a media interview that DNA testing did not prove that the human remains found were Billy's.
7 Sep 2019	Four park staffers who allegedly witnessed Billy's arrest were transferred out of Kaeng Krachan National Park and posted to other provinces after the DSI found Billy's remains and began treating the case as a murder. No reason was reported.
7 Oct 2019	The Department of Special Investigation (DSI) summons 20 witnesses for interviews over the murder of Karen rights activist Porlajee "Billy" Rakchongcharoen. None of the witnesses include the five national park officials implicated in the activist's murder.
15 Oct 2019	The DSI's chief investigator in Billy's case is promoted out of the DSI to assume a role in the Justice Ministry, thus ending his involvement in the case.
12 Nov 2019	Arrest warrants were issued for Chaiwat Limlikit-aksorn, former chief of Kaeng Krachan National Park, and three others on suspicion they murdered Billy.
23 Dec 2019	Chaiwat Limlikit-aksorn and three others were charged with six counts: premeditated murder, unlawful detention, physical assault, robbery, body concealment, and malfeasance. They had surrendered to police in November and were released on 800,000 baht bail each.
23 Jan 2020	Murder charges were dropped against Chaiwat Limlikit-aksorn and three other defendants, leaving them charged with only minor offences. Prosecutors recommended indicting them only for failing to hand over the Karen activist to police after he was arrested.
31 August 2022	Chaiwat Limlikhitaksorn and his three former subordinates were summoned to the Department of Special Investigation (DSI), to acknowledge murder and other charges in connection with the enforced disappearance and presumed death of Karen activist Porlajee Rakchongcharoen
28 September 2023	Chaiwat acquitted of murder, but sentenced to three years in jail for dereliction of duty in connection with Billy’s detention for not reporting the arrest and handing Billy over to police.

== In popular culture ==
Independent film director Pimpaka Towira produced a 30-minute film entitled, The Purple Kingdom, inspired by Billy's disappearance. The film appeared in 2016, but has not been screened widely. Pimpaka says she became aware of Billy through his short movie The Way of Lives, which tells the story of Karen villagers living in Kaeng Krachan National Park's Bangkloi community. The film draws attention to inequalities in Thai society by comparing two women whose husbands have gone missing. While Namthip, the fictional name of Billy's wife in the film, is treated indifferently by authorities when she tries to file a missing persons report with the police, Woon, the fictional wife in the parallel story, is enthusiastically aided by police in finding her husband who was killed in a helicopter crash in the jungle. In real life, it took Pinnapa "Minor" Pruksapan, Billy's real-world wife, more than four years to convince authorities to begin an investigation into Billy's disappearance. "Is it because I'm poor and don't have any money to pay them so the officials are not interested in helping me?", she asks.

The 2026 feature film The Burning Giants by Phuttiphong Aroonpheng was inspired by news of the murder of Rakchongcharoen.

== Related cases ==
Billy is not the only Thai activist to have disappeared or been harmed under mysterious circumstances. As of 2016, according to the UN, there were 82 cases of forced disappearance alone documented in Thailand. According to Amnesty Thailand, at least 59 human-rights defenders have been victims of forced disappearance since 1998.

In 2013, the Bangkok Post reported that Police General Vasit Dejkunjorn, founder of the Thai Spring movement, told a seminar that forced disappearance is a tool which corrupt state power uses to eliminate individuals deemed a threat.

- Tanong Po-arn, President of the Labour Congress of Thailand (disappeared 1991)
- Charoen Wat-aksorn
- Prawet Prapanukul
- Wutthipong "Ko Tee" Kachathamakul
- Den Khamlae, Khok Yao land rights activist, disappeared mid-April 2016.
- Somchai Neelapaijit, human rights activist and Chairman, Muslim Lawyers Association (disappeared 2004)

== See also ==
- Forced disappearances § Thailand
- Human rights in Thailand
- List of people who disappeared mysteriously: post-1970
