= Trirong Sinseubphon =

Thai academic and political activist

Trairong Sinsuebphon
- ไตรรงค์ สินสืบผล

De-facto Leader of Faiyen and Organization for Thai Federation
- Incumbent
- Assumed office 23 March 2022
- Deputy: Nithiwan Wannasiri (Jom Faiyen)
- Preceded by: Wat Wanlayangkoon

Personal details
- Born: 1964 (age 61–62) Nong Khai, Thailand
- Citizenship: Thai (revoked in 2015); Laotian (until 2019); French (since 2019)
- Party: Pheu Thai Party (until 2014); La France Insoumise (since 2024)
- Other political affiliations: People's (since 2025)
- Occupation: Musician, Political activist
- Nickname: ขุนทอง (Khun Thong)

Military service
- Branch/service: Royal Thai Navy
- Years of service: 1986 - 1988 (Active); 1988 - 2010 (Reserve)
- Rank: Chief petty officer third class (Active); Sub Lieutenant (Reserve)

Trairong Sinsuebphon (Thai: ไตรรงค์ สินสืบผล) is widely known by his stage name "Khun Thong " (ขุนทอง), is a Thai musician, republican, lead vocalist, and political activist. He is a core member of "Faiyen" (ไฟเย็น), a Thai political hybrid band blending pop, rock, luk thung (Thai country music), and phleng phuea chiwit (songs for life) styles. The band is renowned for its openly political lyrics that criticize military dictatorship, advocate for democracy, and directly address sensitive issues including the Thai monarchy. He is currently de facto Leader of Faiyen and Organization for Thai Federation since 23 March 2022.

== Early Years and Formation of Faiyen ==
Trirong gained prominence as a founding member of Faiyen, which officially formed around late 2010 . In the band, he primarily plays keyboard, serves as a lead vocalist, and provides harmony vocals. Faiyen rose to popularity among pro-democracy and Refugee , especially following the 2006 and 2014 military coups in Thailand. The group's performances and songs were characterized by sharp, straightforward political satire.

== Post-2014 Coup and Exile ==
After the May 2014 military coup led by the National Council for Peace and Order (NCPO), several Faiyen members including Trairong were summoned under NCPO Order No. 5/2557 to report to authorities. Refusing to comply, they faced arrest warrants issued by the military court for violating the summons. To avoid detention and persecution, Trairong and other band members fled Thailand and became political exiles. They initially sought refuge in Laos PDR starting around 2015, where they continued producing music, releasing dissident songs, and streaming live anti-dictatorship programs online.

Due to increasing safety risks in Laos particularly after the enforced disappearances of several Thai activists in the region most Faiyen members, including Trairong, relocated to Paris, France around 2019 with assistance from international refugee support organizations.

== Current Activity ==
The group continues to host regular live streams titled "Faiyen Meets the People" (ไฟเย็นพบประชาชน) on their FAIYEN CHANNEL YouTube and other platforms, often broadcasting in the late evening Thailand time. Their content focuses on analyzing Thai politics, demanding genuine democracy, criticizing the monarchy, and advocating for human rights and freedom of expression. Despite living in exile for over a decade, they persist in releasing music and commentary that challenges authoritarianism in Thailand.
