= Suicide of Khanakorn Pianchana =

Thai judge who committed suicide to protest Thai justice system

Khanakorn Pianchana
- คณากร เพียรชนะ
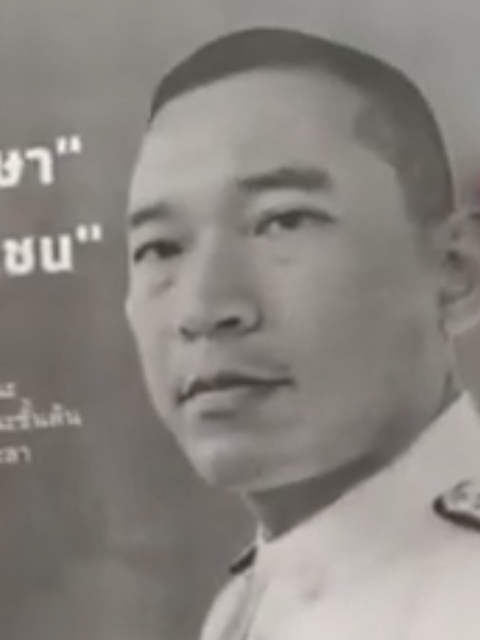
- A mourner at Chiang Mai University holding a sign portraying Khanakorn's selfie and his quote reading “Bring back the judge his verdict. Bring back the citizens their justice.”
- Born: 18 December 1969; Bangkok, Thailand
- Died: 7 March 2020 (aged 50); Chiang Mai, Thailand
- Education: Ramkhamhaeng University (LLB); Thai Bar Association (BL)
- Occupation: Judge
- Years active: 2004–2020
- Known for: Altruistic suicide to protest Thai justice system
- Children: 1

Khanakorn Pianchana (Thai: คณากร เพียรชนะ, RTGS: Khanakon Phianchana; 18 December 1969 – 7 March 2020) was a Thai judge who made a suicide attempt in October 2019 in order to protest against interference in the justice system, and died in a second, fatal suicide attempt in March 2020, after being subject to investigations following his actions. At the time of his first suicide attempt, he was a senior judge in the Yala Provincial Court in south Thailand.

== Early life and career ==
Khanakorn Pianchana born on 18 December 1969 in Bangkok. He studied for secondary education at Phuyai Tepleela School. After he graduated with a law degree from Ramkhamhaeng University, he started his career at the Central Bankruptcy Court in 2004 as a judge. He was transferred to Pattani and subsequently Yala in 2019. He was a Vice Presiding Judge of the Yala Provincial Court at the time, a province that located in South Thailand insurgency region.

== First suicide attempt ==
"At this moment, other fellow judges in Courts of First Instance across the country are being treated the same way as I was. [If] I cannot keep my oath of office, I’d rather die than live without honour,"

— Khanakorn, 2019

At first, Khanakorn was supposed to release his verdict in August 2019. Khanakorn told the accused, that he was being forced from above to convict.

On 4 October 2019, in the Yala province court in the area of South Thailand insurgency, the defendants were waiting for the verdict from judge Khanakorn, on murder and firearms charges. He then began to give a speech and broadcast it to social media via cell phones. One phone began making a sound of calls. Khanakorn ignored every one and people began banging the locked doors from the outside.

Khanakorn continued loudly speaking for almost an hour, reading a 25-page manifesto which was interpreted by local media as being a protest against standards in the Thai legal system. He claimed senior judges tried to rewrite a ruling with a case he was presiding over. He said "I will not alter my verdict because giving death sentences would be too much bad karma."

Khanakorn turned back then recited a judicial oath and shot himself in the chest with a pistol, after he acquitted the defendants' charges due to lack of evidence. He undertook surgery following the incident and later survived because the injuries were not life-threatening. He was afterwards transferred to the Court of Appeal Region 5 in Chiang Mai in his family's reside city.

== Second suicide attempt ==
Before the suicide, Judge Khanakorn uploaded a two-page letter on his Facebook page. He claimed that he had been questioned to disciplinary measure and had criminal charge brought on Firearms Act against him after he had expressed his concerns about the interference into certain rulings. He later committed suicide and died on 7 March 2020 at his home in Chiang Mai. Later, Pheu Thai Party called for a government investigation to establish if there were irregularities at the court.

== Personal life ==
Before Khanakorn moved to Yala, he lived in Chiang Mai with his family. He was a piano teacher in a leading private music school.

== See also ==
- Human rights in Thailand
- Nuamthong Praiwan
- South Thailand insurgency
- Altruistic suicide
