= Department of Special Investigation =

Thai security service

- กรมสอบสวนคดีพิเศษ

Department overview
- Formed: 3 October 2002; 23 years ago
- Type: Ministerial department
- Jurisdiction: Government of Thailand
- Headquarters: Bangkok, Thailand
- Annual budget: 1,190 million baht (FY2019)
- Department executive: Police Major Yutthana Praedam, Director-General
- Parent department: Ministry of Justice
- Website: www.dsi.go.th/index

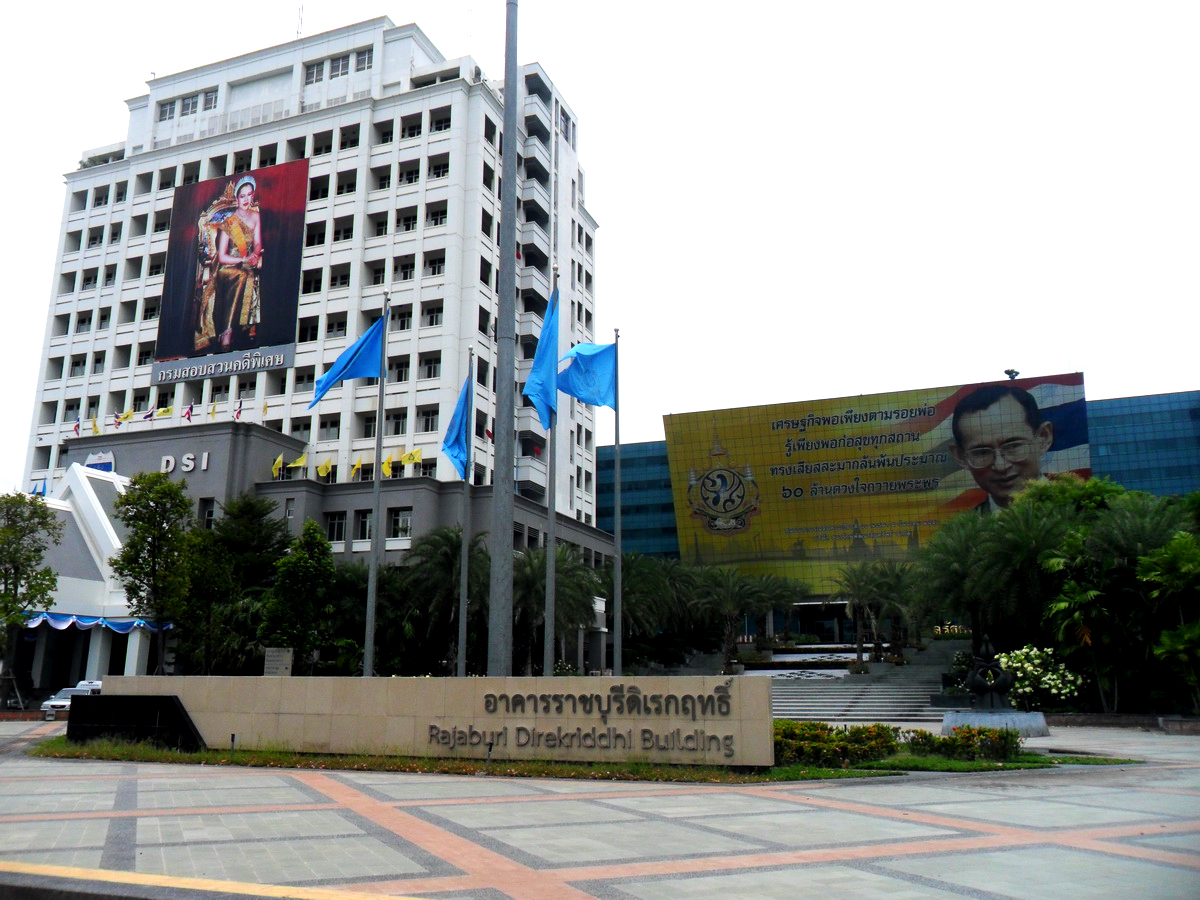
DSI Headquarters (left) at Chaengwattana Rd.

The Department of Special Investigation (DSI), under Thailand's Ministry of Justice (MOJ), operates independently from the Royal Thai Police (RTP) and is responsible for tackling high-profile crimes and transnational criminal enterprises. Its mandate includes against transnational organized crime, counterintelligence, counterterrorism, and investigating complex cases that impact national security, involve organized crime, or implicate high-ranking officials and law enforcement.

It has its own police tactical unit (PTU), the DSI Special Weapons and Tactics (DSI SWAT) Teams, also known as Indiraja 10, which falls under the Bureau of Special Operations. DSI SWAT Teams is used for high-risk tactical law enforcement situations such as anti-irregular military in urban areas, apprehension of armed and dangerous criminals, executive protection, hostage rescue, support urban counterterrorism, and other tactical special operations.

DSI SWAT often jointly trains with the police tactical units of the Royal Thai Police, as well as Arintaraj 26, Counter Terrorism Special Operations Unit, Hanuman, and Sayobpairee 43, and the Eagle 19 Special Operations Team (Eagle 19 SOT), a police tactical unit under the Office of the Narcotics Control Board (ONCB).

As of June 24, 2020, the DSI has also been assigned to investigate cases under the Prevention and Suppression of Torture and Enforced Disappearances Act, once enacted, focusing on incidents of torture and forced disappearances.

The DSI is often regarded as Thailand’s equivalent to the United States’ Federal Bureau of Investigation (FBI). Since its establishment, it has faced ongoing jurisdictional disputes with the police, with tensions arising over authority in high-profile cases. Additionally, DSI officials have repeatedly voiced concerns about political interference, which they claim has hindered the department’s ability to operate independently and effectively.

== History ==
The DSI was established on October 3, 2002, under the Ministries, Bureaus, and Departments Restructuring Act of 2002. It was created to address evolving global, political, and societal challenges, as well as the increasing complexity of violent crimes, technological advancements, and legal loopholes.

As of 2020, the agency had approximately 1,137 personnel. Between 2004 and 2020, the DSI handled 2,860 cases, successfully concluding 2,587, with 273 still under investigation.

== Budget ==
The DSI's budget for fiscal year (FY) 2019 was 1,190 million baht, up from 1,102 million baht in FY2018.

== Organization ==
- Director-General
  - Administrative System Development Group
  - Deputy Director-General
  - Internal Audit Group
  - Office of the Secretary
  - Special Case Expert
  - Bureau
    - Bureau of Consumer Protection Crime
    - Bureau of Development and Logistics
    - Bureau of Financial-Banking Crimes and Money Laundering
    - Bureau of Foreign Affairs and Transnational Crime
    - Bureau of Government Procurement Fraud
    - Bureau of Human Trafficking
    - Bureau of lllegal Financial Business
    - Bureau of Intellectual Property Crime
    - Bureau of Justice Enhancement Affairs (established by an internal order of the Director General)
    - Bureau of Legal Affairs
    - Bureau of Narcotics Crime (established by an internal order of the Director General)
    - Bureau of Natural Resources and Environment Crime
    - Bureau of Policy and Strategy
    - Bureau of Regional Operations
    - Bureau of Security Crime
    - Bureau of Special Case Management
    - Bureau of Special Operations
    - Bureau of Tax Crime
    - Bureau of Technology and Cyber Crime
    - Bureau of Technology and Information Inspection Center

== Notable cases ==
- In 2004, human rights lawyer Somchai Neelapaijit was abducted in broad daylight in Bangkok. He had been representing a group of Muslim suspects allegedly involved in the South Thailand insurgency. Five police officers were charged with the abduction. They were acquitted in 2015. A year later the DSI dropped the case, having shown no results after 12 years of investigation.
- In 2014 the disappearance of Billy Rakchongcharoen, a Karen rights activist, resulted in his wife petitioning the agency to "take up the issue for consideration as a special case". The DSI rejected the petition by the activist's wife in 2017, citing a technicality: the couple was not legally married. Inexplicably, in June 2018 the DSI announced that it would reopen the investigation of Billy's disappearance as a "special case". Media reports intimated that the DSI's change of heart was due to pressure on the Prayut Chan-o-cha administration from international organizations regarding a case that was initially ignored, leading the media to doubt DSI's newfound commitment.
- In 2016, DSI opened a much publicized case against the abbot of Wat Phra Dhammakaya after some funds from an alleged embezzlement case was traced to donations made to the temple. The case has been described as a proxy war between supporters and opponents of the temple. One of the most criticized and debated aspects of DSI's handling of the case was its refusal to give the abbot his charges at the temple. Other criticisms of DSI's handling of the case include continuing to pursue the charges after the affected credit union withdrew charges, in violation of Thai Criminal Procedure Code Section 39(2).

== Controversies ==
=== Tawatchai Incident ===
On 30 August 2016 it was reported by DSI that one of the suspects it had detained was allegedly found unconscious and hanging in his cell. The suspect, Tawatchai Anukul, who was a suspect in a case of land deed fraud, was then rushed to Mongkutwattana Hospital where he was pronounced dead after several attempts at revival. DSI gave conflicting reports about how Tawatchai was found, with one official stating he likely committed suicide by hanging himself with his shirt. Another official gave a report stating he was found hanging by his socks. Tawatchai's family reported that DSI gave them contradictory information regarding his death. For instance, family members pointed out that the wound on Tawatchai's neck looked like it came from a wire rather than clothing.

A post-mortem examination revealed that Tawatchai had died of a ruptured liver, suggesting blunt trauma, as well as suffocation. DSI stated that the liver rupture was due to the hospital team performing CPR on Tawatchai in an attempt to revive him, which the hospital dismissed as impossible. DSI also announced that their CCTV servers had malfunctioned at the time and therefore there were no recordings from security cameras of the incident.

=== Article 44 death ===
During the 23 day lock down of Wat Phra Dhammakaya in 2017 that junta leader Prayut Chan-o-cha ordered using article 44 of the interim constitution, one follower in the temple died of an asthma attack during the operation. According to temple spokespeople, the death was caused by the halting of an ambulance at the junta's blockade that delayed emergency response. DSI, however, claimed that the temple did not notify emergency services until after the follower had died. DSI stepped back from this statement later, when the temple revealed time stamped LINE messages asking for emergency services that supported Wat Phra Dhammakaya's account of the timeline. The authenticity of the messages was not disputed by DSI, however DSI still denied delaying emergency services.

== Corruption in the ranks ==
- Tarit Pengdith, former director-general of DSI until his dismissal in 2014, was accused by the National Anti-Corruption Commission (NACC) of hiding assets while serving as DSI director-general. The NACC found that Tarit had amassed unexplained wealth of 346.65 million baht during his 12 years at DSI. The supreme court found Tarit guilty and sentenced him to six months in jail and a fine of 10,000 baht, commuted to a three-month term and a fine of 5,000 baht because he confessed. It suspended the jail term for two years because he had not previously been sentenced to prison.
