= Faiyen =

Political music band, republican activist group, and podcasters

- ไฟเย็น
- Formation: 2011
- Founded at: Thailand
- Type: Republican activists, podcasters, and musical group
- Location: Paris, France
- Methods: Political music, Podcasting
- De-facto Leader: Trirong Sinseubphon (Khuntong)
- De-facto Deputy Leader: Nithiwan Wannasiri (Jom)
- Key people: Khunthong, Chom, Yammy, Port
- Affiliations: Organization for Thai Federation
- Formerly called: Tha Sao (วงท่าเสา)
- Musical career
- Genres: Pop; Luk thung; Rock; Phleng phuea chiwit
- Years active: 2011–present
- Label: Faiyen Studio
- Members: Khunthong; Jom; Yammy; Port; Tito; Gluay
- Past members: Wat Wanlayangkoon (2011-2014); Yonok (2011-2013); Au (2011-2020)
- Website: faiyen.bandcamp.com

Faiyen Channel
- Genre: Talk
- Format: video
- Language: Thai

Production
- Production: Khunthong
- Length: 1–5+ hours

Technical specifications
- Video format: YouTube

Related
- Website: Waiting updated

Faiyen Phopprachachon
- Hosting: Khunthong, Jom
- Original release: 2014

Serichon Variety
- Hosting: Khunthong
- Original release: 2019

Faiyen (Thai: ไฟเย็น) is a Thai political hybrid band of pop and modern luk thung, republican and human-rights activist group, and podcaster. The group emerged as a band that produced satirical songs of monarchy in 2011, after red shirts' protests were suppressed by the Thai army, allegedly supported by the monarchy. The group fled to Laos, sought to evade the lèse majesté law, amid 2014 Thai coup d'état. In 2019, fearing of a death threat from Thai authority, current members, Khunthong, Chom, Yammy, Tito, and former member Wat Wanlayangkoon have been in exile in France, podcasting about politics in Thailand daily from there. Port is currently living in Bangkok, he was charged and briefly imprisoned on the lèse majesté law in 2021.

== History ==
=== 2011–2014: Formation, UDD movement ===
Faiyen (literally: Cool Fire) established in 2011 under the lead of Wat Wanlayangkoon, a Thai renown Sriburapha Award's writer. They originally called Tha Sao, originated from Wat's pen name, Wat Tha Sao. According to Port, the guitarist, the group officially debuted on 31 December 2011, they played in front of Bangkok Remand Prison for the countdown event. Principle members are Wat Wallayangkul, Khunthong, Jom, Yonok, Au, Gluay. In 2013, Yonok left, Port joined the group instead.

According to Khunthong, Faiyen goal was to criticize 'the elite', who are the problem of Thai society. The name 'Faiyen' means 'sparkler', a handheld firework, symbolizes the group’s objective of using music to immerse Thai people into more critical thinkings.

They participated in pro-democracy movement with United Front for Democracy Against Dictatorship (UDD) that has become well-known to the red shirts and people who are critical of the monarchy. They had never played on the main stage of the UDD, the main red shirt faction affiliated with Thaksin Shinawatra, because they challenged the monarchy and draconian law of lese-majeste. They played only at small red-shirt stage, organized by other sub-group or on a side stage to UDD protest events.

Renowned academic and Lèse-majesté lawyer, Somsak Jeamteerasakul and Arnon Nampa are their legal advisors. The lyrics were sent to them to check for lèse majesté violation issue.

In 2014, Khunthong, and occasionally Jom, Port, began their political radio program called 'Faiyen meet with the people' (Faiyen Phopprachachon) at 'Red Guard Radio' in Pathum Thani area.

On 17 May 2014 Black May 20 years' remembrance was the last time they performed in Thailand, after they had performed at many democratic movements and remembrances. On 22 May 2014 Thai coup d'état, amid fear of life threatening and political imprison from the military junta, all Faiyen members except Port, fled to Thailand's neighbor, Laos, before the junta called Jom for a political re-education program, 'attitude adjustment'. The junta then filed lèse majesté complaint against them.

=== 2014–2019: Exile in Laos ===
After the coup, Faiyen members lived together in hiding places around Vientiane, Laos. Except for Port, he went back and forth between Thailand and Laos since September 2014, because he was not the target from a national security. They resumed activism podcasting live stream of 'Faiyen meet with the people' program, carry on from radio program in Thailand, but they could not perform live music in public anymore, afraid of political threats.

In 2015, Yammy joined the band in Laos, before that in 2014, Yammy sang a covered version of the band The Commoner’s 'Song of the Common People' ('บทเพลงของสามัญชน') and posted it on social media. Khunthong saw that and invited her to join the group as vocal. Yammy became known by a single 'The Bitter Red Bowl' ('Khan Daeng Salaeng Jai'), sang by her, in 2016. It was a forbidden song in Thailand, ordered by the military junta.

In 2016, still in Bangkok, Port went to perform and sell CDs of Faiyen songs at the event 'August 7 Marking Democracy: Music Poetry Art.' He was arrested first time. The police claimed that the CDs were copyrighted. Port decided to quit his job and went to join the group in Laos.

In July 2017, Wuthipong 'Kotee' Kochathamakun, a Red Shirt activist, was abducted in Vientiane, Laos, by 10 Thai-speaking armed men and was presumed dead. On 10 December 2018, Surachai Danwattananusorn, an exile activist in Laos was disappeared. On 11 December, two of his aides, Chatchan "Phoo Chana" Boonphawal and Kraidet "Kasalong" Luelert, also in exile in Vientiane, they too disappeared and were found dead a month later along the Thai side of the Mekong. On the same day, Faiyen received the same warning from Laos police who looks after them as Surachai’s group, telling them to hide while Prayut Chan-o-cha was visiting the country.

Faiyen were the last on the run Thai exiles in Laos, Yammy gave an interview to the press that there was certainly a killing order came from Thailand, with help on the Laos side. She believed that the Thai government were hunting them down one by one. They had moved seven times in the span of three years for their own protection. Early 2019, the members of the band launched a "Save Faiyen" campaign appealing for asylum in an unspecified country.

=== 2019-: Exile in France ===
On 3 August 2019, feared being kidnapped or killed, Khunthong, Jom, Yam, and Tito arrived in France from Laos on exile, after accepted as political refugees. It took them about two to three months before they were granted permission to travel to Paris, unable to act immediately, because they did not have enough money to buy plane tickets. They were aided by Miles4Migrants group, a charity for refugees. Former member, Wat Wanlayangkoon fled to France earlier in May 2019. They resumed activism again after seeking asylum period ended, by starting podcast 'Faiyen meet with the people' on YouTube channel. The podcast focuses on abolish of the monarchy topic.

On 5 March 2021, Port who was getting treatment for pancreatitis, diabetes, and peripheral neuropathy in Thailand was arrested by Royal Thai Police on lèse majesté in his hometown neighborhood Udom Suk, Bangkok.

Wat Wanlayangkoon, the founder of the band, died on 22 March 2022 while staying political exile in France.

== Musical style and development ==
Why Not Grant Bail? is a lèse majesté theme, criticizes the law, highlights the discrimination in the right to bail. It names lèse majesté prisoners such as Da Torpedo, Somyot Prueksakasemsuk, Surachai Danwattananusorn, and Ampon Tangnoppakul, who were repeatedly denied bail.

They have a song about traffic jams that were cause by a royal motorcade. Some key words hint ideas that related to Thai monarchy.

Their debut song is Uncle Somchai and Auntie Somjit. The song is about the old couple and their children. It is very risky song according to Jom, the lyrics were carefully reviewed by Arnon Nampa. Renowned republican activist, Ekapob "Tang Achiwa" Luara was charged for a speech about these two fictional characters.

They have adopted music industry techniques of pop music genre to make it as not catchy to understand by the mass the red shirts supporters. They distance comdemned red shirts for support ruling party. Later support Youth political movement to fight red shirts.

Faiyenism หลักนิยมไฟเย็น
- De-facto Leader: Trirong Sinsuepphon (Khuntong)
- De-facto Lieutenant: Nithiwat Wannasiri (Jom)
- Founder: Wat Waralyangkun
- Founded: 2011
- Headquarters: Paris (Since 2019)
- Ideology: Trumpism; Republicanism; Anti-monarchism; Progressivism; Liberal democracy Left-wing populism Federalism; Anti-communism; Global abolition monarchies
- Political position: Left-wing
- Colors: Red
- Slogan: "ข้อสามไฟเย็น" (The Third Principle is Faiyen)
- Anthem: "เพลงเพื่อน" (Friends)

== Discography ==
- บทเพลง ปฏิรูปประชาธิปไตย (Remastered 2020) (Democracy reformist songs) (2011)
- บทเพลงของมิตรเพื่อนท่านหนึ่ง (Anonymous songs) (2016)
- Khan Daeng Salaeng Jai (2016)
- บทเพลงเปลี่ยนแปลง (2020) (Change songs) (2020)

== Members ==
Principal members

- Wat Wallayangkul – lead vocals (2011-2014)
- Yonok – lead vocals, guitars (2011-2013)
- Jom – lead vocals (2011-)
- Khunthong – synthesiser, piano, guitars (2011-)
- Au – percussions (2011-2020)
- Gluay – drums (2011-)

Early members

- Port – guitars, basses (2013-)
- Yammy – lead vocals (2015-)

Late members

- Tito – (2019-)
