= Jiraphop Bhuridej =

Thai police officer

- จิรภพ ภูริเดช
- Born: 2 December 1975 (age 50)
- Years active: 2017 - Present

Police Lieutenant General Jirabhop Bhuridej (Thai: จิรภพ ภูริเดช), also known by his nickname “Kong” (ก้อง), is a Thai police officer who serves as Assistant Commissioner-General of the Royal Thai Police. He previously served as commissioner of the Central Investigation Bureau and commander of the Crime Suppression Division. He is an independent director of Airports of Thailand Public Company Limited.

== Police service ==
Police Service
Years / Dates	Role
2017 - 18 October 2018	Deputy Commander of the Crime Suppression Division
18 October 2018 - 1 October 2020	Commander of the Crime Suppression Division
1 October 2020 - 1 October 2021	Deputy Commissioner of the Central Investigation Bureau
1 October 2021 - 1 October 2025	Commissioner of the Central Investigation Bureau
1 October 2025 - present	Assistant Commissioner-General of the Royal Thai Police

== Family ==
Phuridech's brother, General Jakrapob Bhuridej, serves as a deputy director of the Royal Security Command and commander of the Royal Aide-de-Camp Department. According to investigative reports by journalist Andrew MacGregor Marshall and The Diplomat, Jakrapob was tasked with organizing operations against exiled dissidents, including the 2020 disappearance of activist Wanchalearm Satsaksit. In 2026, Marshall further alleged that Jakrapob had overseen the operation, while identifying his brother Jiraphop Bhuridej as chief of the Crime Suppression Division of the Royal Thai Police.

== Public controversies ==
In April 2026, Jiraphop became the subject of reports concerning his contacts with Cambodian officials and businessmen. On 27 April, the Thai Facebook page CSI LA published photographs showing Jiraphop and other senior Thai police officers dining with a Cambodian delegation that included officials and business figures. CSI LA identified one of the Cambodian attendees as a person associated with Cambodian businessman Rithy Raksmei, whom the page described as a senior figure in the K99 Group.
