= Chaiwat Limlikit-aksorn =

Thai conservation officer

- ชัยวัฒน์ ลิ้มลิขิตอักษร

Chief of the National Park Office
- Incumbent
- Assumed office 1 March 2023

Chaiwat Limlikit-aksorn (Thai: ชัยวัฒน์ ลิ้มลิขิตอักษร) is a Thai conservation officer and Chief of the Office of National Parks. He previously served as Chief of Kaeng Krachan National Park.

== Career ==
Limlikit-aksorn was a whistleblower for corruption with the Thai national parks.

== Murder charge ==
Limlikit-aksorn was charged in the murder of Porlajee Rakchongcharoen, a Karen activist, in 2014. He was later acquitted in September 2023, but sentenced to three years in prison for dereliction of duty in not reporting the arrest. He has retained his position of Chief of the Office of National Parks as the court case against him was not final.
