= Yala Provincial Court =

Family Court

Yala Provincial Court is a court of first instance in the province of Yala in southern Thailand. It is located in Sukhayang Road, Sateng, in Mueang Yala District. It has jurisdiction over all of Yala Province except Betong District, which falls under Betong Provincial Court, and excluding juvenile and family cases, which fall under Yala Juvenile and Family Court.

The province of Yala is in the area of the South Thailand insurgency and cases at the court are often related to the insurgency.

There have been claims that there may have been political interference in the administration of justice in the court. In October 2019, Kanakorn Pianchana, a senior judge there, shot himself after claiming to have been pressured to change a verdict in a capital case from not guilty to guilty despite a lack of evidence to convict. The Pheu Thai Party called for a government investigation to establish if there were irregularities at the court. The incident led to an official statement from the Thailand Court of Justice that senior judges were empowered to review the decisions of more junior judges but not to change them.
