= Thai labour law =

Employment legislation in Thailand

The labour law of Thailand takes place under the framework of several acts of parliament and decrees, primarily the Labour Protection Act, B.E. 2541 (1998), and is mainly governed by the Ministry of Labour. Most of the legal framework was developed during the mid-to-late twentieth century, as Thailand's economy saw rapid expansion beginning in the Cold War period.

While the law protects workers' rights of association and organization for collective bargaining, and allows workers to form unions, in practice the protections are inadequate, leading to a generally weak union system. The laws also only protect workers in the formal labour sector, and often don't reach Thailand's large migrant worker population, many of whom are employed illegally. The practice of modern slavery in some of the country's industries became a subject of international attention in the 2010s, with the government attempting to address the issues in response.

== Wages ==
Wages are the major source of household income in Thailand, although wage income distribution varies by region: Almost three-quarters of the population in Bangkok are in households that receive wage income, compared with less than half in the northern region. During the period 2007–2014, wage income grew markedly, and then began to drop starting in 2015. As of 2020 wage growth stagnation afflicts most occupations. Wage growth was negative in urban areas, but positive in rural areas. In the period 2007–2013, wages, farm incomes, and remittances contributed to poverty reduction; in the period 2015–2017 these were sources of rising poverty.

=== Minimum wage ===
In December 2019, the National Wage Committee recommended that the minimum daily wage for unskilled labour be increased by five to six baht, from 308 to 330 baht to 313–336 baht, effective 1 January 2020. The cabinet approved the proposal on 11 December. The move will impose 10 new minimum wage levels, depending on the province. The highest, 336-baht a day, will be for Chonburi and Phuket Provinces, and the lowest rate of 313 baht for the three southern border provinces of Narathiwat, Pattani, and Yala. Bangkok's minimum wage will be 331 baht. The wage hike drew immediate criticism for being so modest, and below what the ruling government party had earlier promised.

As of January 2020, the average wage in Bangkok was 20,854 baht per month according to the National Statistical Office (NSO). Real wages in Thailand as a whole have dropped from 19,107 baht per month in the fourth quarter of 2016 (4Q2016) to 15,337 baht in 4Q2019.

== Jobs prohibited to foreigners ==
A law originating during the nationalist government of Plaek Phibunsongkhram in the 1940s limited certain occupations to Thai nationals. Prior to 1 July 2018, foreigners were not permitted to work in the following occupations. The list is in the process of being rewritten as 12 professions previously limited to Thais will be opened to foreigners.

1. Labour work except work on fishing boats.
2. Agriculture, animal husbandry, forestry or fishery, except work requiring specialized knowledge, farm supervision, or labour on fishing boats, particularly marine fishery.
3. Bricklaying, carpentry, or other construction work.
4. Wood carving.
5. Driving motor vehicles or vehicles which do not use machinery or mechanical devices, except piloting aircraft internationally.
6. Front shop sales and auction sale work.
7. Supervising, auditing, or giving service in accountancy, except occasional internal auditing.
8. Cutting or polishing precious or semi-precious stones.
9. Haircutting, hairdressing, or beautification.
10. Cloth weaving by hand.
11. Mat weaving or making utensils from reed, rattan, jute, hay, or bamboo.
12. Making rice paper by hand.
13. Lacquer work.
14. Making Thai musical instruments.
15. Niello work.
16. Goldsmith, silversmith, or gold/copper alloy smith work.
17. Stone work.
18. Making Thai dolls.
19. Making mattresses or quilts.
20. Making alms bowls.
21. Making silk products by hand.
22. Making Buddha images.
23. Knife making.
24. Making paper or cloth umbrellas.
25. Making shoes.
26. Making hats.
27. Brokerage or agency except in international trading.
28. Professional civil engineering concerning design and calculation, systemization, analysis, planning, testing, construction supervision, or consulting services, excluding work requiring specialized techniques.
29. Professional architectural work concerning design, drawing/making, cost estimation, or consulting services.
30. Dressmaking.
31. Pottery.
32. Cigarette rolling by hand.
33. Tour guiding or conducting.
34. Hawking of goods and Thai typesetting by hand.
35. Unwinding and twisting silk by hand.
36. Clerical or secretarial work.
37. Legal services or engaging in legal work, except arbitration work. Work relating to defense of cases at arbitration level, provided the law governing the dispute under consideration by the arbitrators is not Thai law, or it is a case where there is no need to apply for the enforcement of such arbitration award in Thailand.

== Foreign labour cap ==
On 1 July 2018 a new labour law will go into effect, capping the number of foreign employees at businesses operating in Thailand. The move was taken to ensure Thais are not forced out of the labour market. Passed by the National Legislative Assembly in April 2018, the new law will restrict the number of foreign employees to a maximum of 20 percent of workforce in the industrial and services sectors. The law is opposed by business operators, especially those from small and medium-sized enterprises. (SMEs). The law will impact their hiring of low-cost migrant labour.

== See also ==
- Human trafficking in Thailand
