= Chucheep Chiwasut =

Thai radio disc-jockey and activist

- ชูชีพ ชีวะสุทธิ์
- Born: 1953 (age 72–73)
- Disappeared: 8 May 2019
- Occupations: Revolutionary, Opposition, Anti-monarchism activist, Federalism activist, Anti-communism
- Years active: 2005 - 2019
- Title: President of Organization for Thai Federation
- Term: 1st President
- Predecessor: Position established
- Successor: Trirong Sinsuepphon (De-facto)
- Political party: Organization for Thai Federation (since 2008); Thai Rak Thai Party (2000 - 2007)

Chucheep Chiwasut (Thai: ชูชีพ ชีวะสุทธิ์), also known as Uncle Sanam Luang (Thai: ลุงสนามหลวง), is a Thai radio disc-jockey and activist. He disappeared in May 2018 after reportedly being arrested in Vietnam, and has been missing since.

== Disappearance ==
In April 2019, Chucheep, along with activists Siam Theerawut and Kritsana Thapthai, reportedly attempted to cross the border into Vietnam from Laos using fake passports. On 8 May 2019, Human Rights Watch reported the trio were handed over to Thai authorities from Vietnam. The Thai government has not acknowledged their arrest and detention, and Deputy Prime Minister Prawit Wongsuwan denied the activists were in custody.

== See also ==
- Siam Theerawut
- Kritsana Thapthai
