= Jakrapob Bhuridej =

General Jakrapob Bhuridej (จักรภพ ภูริเดช) (born 25 May 1969), is a Thai military officer. He is a deputy commander of the Royal Security Command and commander of the Royal Guard Command.

== Military career ==
Jakrapob graduated from the Armed Forces Academies Preparatory School (Class 28) and the Royal Thai Air Force Academy (Class 35), and began his career in the Royal Thai Air Force.

Military Career
Years / Dates	Role
5 March 2010	Air Vice Marshal, appointed commander of a Royal Aide-de-Camp unit
1 March 2012	Air Marshal
4 July 2012	Commander of the Royal Guard unit under the Royal Security Command.
2 June 2017	Head of the Special Operations Office within the Royal Security Command.
1 August 2017	Deputy Commander of the Royal Security Command
2 May 2019	Deputy Commander and substantive commander of the Royal Guard Command

== Family ==
Jakrapob is the second of four children of Admiral Sompop Bhuridej, a former special aide-de-camp and commander of the Royal Thai Navy's Third Naval Area Command, and Rossukon Bhuridej, a former senator. His siblings include:

- Natthapop Bhuridej, a former assistant minister under the government of Prime Minister Abhisit Vejjajiva.
- Phatita Bhuridej Nonghanphithak, a faculty member at the Faculty of Dentistry, Chulalongkorn University, and wife of General Thitirat Nonghanphithak, a former commissioner of the Central Investigation Bureau who now serves as a royal aide-de-camp and Deputy Commander of the Royal Aide-de-Camp Department.
- Police Lieutenant General Jiraphop Bhuridej also known by nickname "Kong" (ก้อง), who served as Commissioner of the Central Investigation Bureau from 2021 to 2025 and is an Assistant Commissioner-General of the Royal Thai Police. a graduate of the Armed Forces Academies Preparatory School (Class 34) and the Royal Police Cadet Academy (Class 50).

== Controversies ==
According to investigative reports by journalist Andrew MacGregor Marshall and The Diplomat, sources allege that Jakrapob was tasked with organizing operations against exiled dissidents, including the 2020 disappearance of activist Wanchalearm Satsaksit. In 2026, Marshall further alleged that Jakrapob had overseen the operation, while identifying his brother Jiraphop Bhuridej as chief of the Crime Suppression Division of the Royal Thai Police.
