= Kritsana Thapthai =

Thai anti-monarchy activist

Kritsana Thapthai (Thai: กฤษณะ ทัพไทย) is a Thai anti-monarchy activist. In May 2019, Kritsana disappeared after being handed over to Thai authorities from Vietnam. He has been missing since.

== Activism ==
Krtisana was under police investigation in Thailand for allegations of lèse-majesté. He fled Thailand to Laos after the 2014 Thai military coup.

== Disappearance ==
In April 2019, Kritsana along with activists Chucheep Chiwasut, known as Uncle Sanam Luang, and Siam Theerawut, were reported to have crossed into Vietnam from Laos using fake passports.

On 8 May 2019, the trio were reportedly turned over to Thai authorities, according to Human Rights Watch, though Thai deputy prime minister Prawit Wongsuwon denied it.

== See also ==
- Siam Theerawut
- Chucheep Chiwasut
