= Den Khamlae =

- เด่น คำแหล้
- Disappeared: 16 April 2016; Khok Yao Forest, Khon San District, Chaiyaphum Province, Thailand
- Spouse: Suphap Khamlae

Den Khamlae (Thai: เด่น คำแหล้) was a Karen farmer land rights activist in Thailand. In April 2016, Den disappeared from Chaiyaphum province's Khon San district amidst a land dispute, and has been missing since.

== Activism ==
Den campaigned for land rights for poor residents of Chaiyaphum province in northeastern Thailand. He was the head of the Kok Yao community.

In 2011, Den was charged with encroachment and imprisoned. He was released on bail in 2013.

On 10 March 2016, a court writ was circulated by military and forest officials ordering residents in Kok Yao to vacate their homes with 8 days, as the properties were claimed to encroach on the Phu Sum Puk Nam Sanctuary. Den led a group of affected residents to seek help from the government to overturn the court order.

== Disappearance ==
On 16 April 2016, Den disappeared after entering the Khok Yao Forest to collect bamboo shoots and mushrooms. On 1 August 2016, a loincloth was found that belonged to Den. Human remains were later found that were believed to be Den's, according to a Central Institute of Forensic Science investigation.

In July 2017, Den and his wife Suphap were sentenced to 6 months in prison, following the Supreme Court's upholding of a previous conviction by a lower court for trespassing on protecting land.
