= Organization for Thai Federation =

Organization for Thai Federation องค์การสหพันธรัฐไท
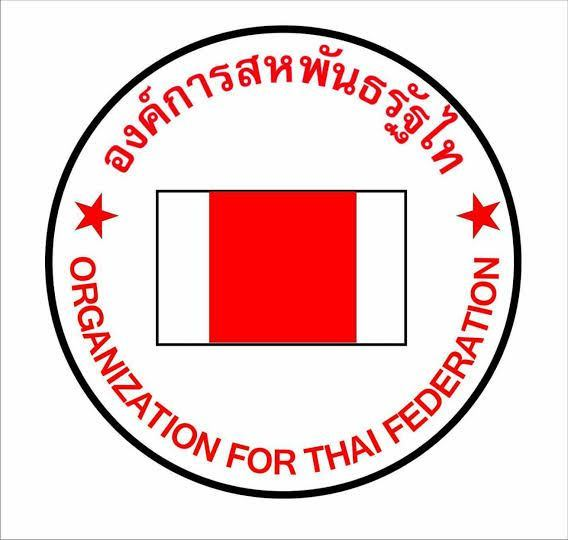
- President: Chucheep Chiwasut
- Lieutenant: Wutipong Kachathamkun
- Founder: Chucheep Chiwasut
- Founded: 2008
- Headquarters: YouTube, Facebook, Line
- Musician wing: Faiyen
- Ideology: Federalism; Republicanism; Anti-monarchism; Anti-communism; Liberal democracy
- Political position: Left-wing
- Colors: Red
- Slogan: "ชูธงสหพันธรัฐไท" (Raise the Thai Federation Flag!)
- Anthem: Raise the Thai Federation Flag (ชูธงสหพันธรัฐไท)

Website
- Official website

The Organization for Thai Federation (Thai: องค์การสหพันธรัฐไท; abbreviated OTF) is a Thai dissident political movement that advocates for the transformation of Thailand from a unitary constitutional monarchy into a federal republic. The group promotes the division of the country into approximately ten semi-autonomous states under a presidential system, emphasizing decentralized governance, political freedoms, and opposition to centralized military rule.

OTF is established in 2008, it has primarily operated in exile, particularly from Laos, and has faced severe repression from Thai authorities, including charges of sedition, membership in a secret society, and alleged anti-monarchist activities.

The group's symbols include a modified Thai flag (white-red-white stripes, omitting the central blue band) and black T-shirts, which have been central to several high-profile legal cases.

As of October 2019, at least 17 individuals had been charged in connection with the organization across six major lawsuits, resulting in convictions, acquittals, and ongoing appeals, with four reported disappearances.

== History ==
The OTF traces its origins to 2008, when it began as an underground radio network hosted by exiled activists critical of Thailand's political establishment. Initial activities focused on disseminating republican and federalist ideas through informal broadcasts. By the early 2010s, with the rise of social media, the group shifted to platforms such as YouTube, Facebook, and Line for communication, idea propagation, and coordination. A pivotal moment occurred following the 2014 military coup that installed the National Council for Peace and Order (NCPO) under General Prayut Chan-o-cha. Several core members, facing charges of lèse-majesté (Penal Code Section 112) and sedition (Section 116), fled to Laos, where they restructured the organization to explicitly oppose the junta.

Public awareness of the OTF surged in August 2018, when NCPO intelligence reports first documented its activities as a threat to national unity. The group was accused of coordinating from Laos to incite domestic unrest, including symbolic protests on national holidays. Thai Prime Minister Prayut publicly condemned the federalist concept in September 2018, arguing that it violated the constitution by implying the division of the unitary kingdom into independent states and rejecting the national tricolor flag in favor of the OTF's white-red-white emblem. By late 2018, coordinated actions such as wearing black T-shirts in public spaces—led to a nationwide crackdown, with websites and online channels blocked under the Computer Crime Act. (Thai: พรบ.คอมพิวเตอร์)

The organization's visibility declined after a series of suspected abductions of key figures in 2017–2019, amid reports of cross-border operations targeting Thai exiles in Laos and Vietnam. These events, including the discovery of mutilated bodies in the Mekong River, raised international human rights concerns about enforced disappearances.

== Ideology ==
The OTF's core ideology centers on federalism as a solution to Thailand's centralized governance, which it views as inefficient and prone to authoritarian abuse. Proponents argue for restructuring the country into approximately ten federal states, each with significant autonomy in local affairs, while maintaining a national framework under a directly elected president rather than a constitutional monarchy. This vision emphasizes democratic freedoms, including freedom of speech, assembly, and political expression, contrasting sharply with the NCPO's restrictions.

The group frames its agenda as a peaceful reform movement, drawing on historical precedents of federal systems in other nations. However, Thai authorities interpret these ideas as subversive, equating them with rebellion, separatism, and anti-monarchism. Prime Minister Prayut described the OTF's proposals in 2018 as potentially constituting "overthrowing the system of government," highlighting conflicts with Article 1 of the Thai Constitution, which defines the nation as a single, indivisible kingdom.

== Organization and Leadership ==
The OTF operates as a loose network rather than a hierarchical structure, relying on online coordination and symbolic merchandise distribution for membership recruitment and activities. It lacks a formal charter or public headquarters, functioning primarily in exile to evade prosecution. Communication occurs via encrypted apps like Line and public platforms such as YouTube "underground radio" shows, where leaders host discussions under pseudonyms like the "Three Musketeers."

Key figures include:

- Chuchip Cheevasut (alias "Uncle Sanam Luang"; ไทย: "ลุงสนามหลวง"): President and a former underground radio host. Accused of leading operations from Laos, he managed online sales of OTF merchandise. Reported arrested in Vietnam in January 2019 and possibly extradited to Thailand; his status remains unknown as of 2020.
- Wutipong Kachathamkun (alias "Ko Tee"; ไทย: "โกตี๋"): Co-founder and early leader, wanted on lèse-majesté charges. Abducted in July 2017 in a neighboring country by armed assailants; presumed missing or deceased.
- Siam Thirawut (alias "Comrade Sticky Rice with Mango"): Exiled coordinator involved in online propagation. Arrested with Chusap in Vietnam; fate unknown.
- Kritsana Thap Thai (alias "Comrade Young Blood"): Media host and planner. Also arrested in Vietnam; no confirmed updates.
- Wat Worlayangkun (alias "Comrade 112"): Fled post-2014 coup; sought asylum in France in July 2019 amid regional crackdowns on exiles.

Four leaders including Chusap, Siam, Kritsana, and Wutipong were reported missing by May 2019, with human rights groups alleging state involvement in their disappearances.
