= Somchai Neelapaijit =

Thai lawyer, disappeared in 2004

- สมชาย นีละไพจิตร
- Born: 13 May 1951
- Disappeared: 12 March 2004 (aged 52); Bangkok, Thailand
- Status: Missing for 22 years, 7 months and 17 days
- Occupations: Lawyer; Human rights activist
- Years active: 1970s–2004
- Spouse: Angkhana Neelaphaijit

Somchai Neelapaijit (Thai - สมชาย นีละไพจิตร; 13 May 1951 – last seen on 12 March 2004), a Thai Muslim lawyer and human rights activist who "disappeared" 12 March 2004 during Thaksin Shinawatra's regime. On that date, Somchai was last seen in Ramkhamhaeng where eyewitnesses saw four men dragging him from his car. He has not been seen since.

Five police officers were charged with coercion in the Somchai case. They were acquitted in 2015. A year later the Department of Special Investigation dropped the case, having shown no results after 12 years of investigation. The case of the (probable) death of Somchai Neelaphaijit has not since been solved. In 2016 the DSI declared the investigation "over".

== Background ==
At the time of his disappearance, Somchai represented five Muslim suspects allegedly involved in an army camp raid in Narathiwat in January 2004. The incident triggered the interminable unrest in far south Thailand. Somchai, who had worked in the legal profession for 30 years, was outspoken in his call for the army to end martial law, imposed in January 2004, in the region. As of 2017 martial law remains in effect in Pattani, Yala, and Narathiwat.

In 2006, the Criminal Court sentenced Pol Maj Ngern Thongsuk of the Crime Suppression Division to three years in jail for his connection with Somchai's disappearance. Four other suspects, all policemen accused of robbery and illegal use of force, were acquitted. Pol Maj Ngern later disappeared. His family testified that he died in a landslide accident. The court declared him a missing person.

== Prime minister acknowledges official involvement ==
In 2014 the Bangkok Post reported: "In January 2006, the court acquitted four of the accused but convicted Pol Major Ngern of the relatively minor charge of coercion. Then-prime minister Thaksin Shinawatra made a significant statement a day after the court verdict acknowledging that Somchai was dead and government officials were implicated".

== Status of the case ==
The investigation into Somchai's fate was launched in 2004. The last location where there was a reported sighting of him was at Chaleena Princess Hotel, located in Soi Mahatthai, also known as Soi Ramkhamhaeng 65, which serves as a shortcut connecting Ramkhamhaeng Road and Lat Phrao Road via Soi Lat Phrao 112. His wife in 2009 published an account of the efforts made by her, legal advisors, and NGOs on Somchai's behalf. As of March 2017, the thirteenth anniversary of his disappearance, he is suspected to be dead.

In late-2013 the DSI said the police file of the case had gone missing, but later claimed it had been found. As of 2014 the status of the case and even which department is handling it was unknown.

In 2016 Department of Special Investigation (DSI) "declared the case closed, saying no culprits have been found".

== See also ==
- Disappearance of Billy Rakchongcharoen
- List of people who disappeared mysteriously (2000–present)
- South Thailand insurgency
- Timeline of events related to the South Thailand insurgency
