= Siam Theerawut =

- สยาม ธีรวุฒิ
- Disappeared: 8 May 2019

Siam Theerawut (Thai: สยาม ธีรวุฒิ) is a Thai anti-monarchy activist. In May 2019, Siam disappeared after being handed over to Thai authorities from Vietnam.

== Activism ==
Siam fled Thailand after the 2014 Thai military coup.

== Disappearance ==
In April 2019, Siam along with activists Chucheep Chiwasut, known as Uncle Sanam Luang, and Kritsana Thapthai, reportedly crossed the border from Laos into Vietnam on fake passports. On 8 May 2019, Human Rights Watch reported trio were turned over to Thai authorities, who did not acknowledge their arrest or detention.

On 20 December 2024, the Samut Prakan Provincial Court refused a request to declare Siam a missing person after a request was filed by his mother, Kanya Theerawut on 20 September 2024. The court denied the request due to Siam's outstanding arrest warrant.

== See also ==
- Chucheep Chiwasut
- Kritsana Thapthai
