= Wanchalearm Satsaksit =

Thai pro-democracy activist (born 1982)

- วันเฉลิม สัตย์ศักดิ์สิทธิ์
- Born: 11 August 1982 (age 44); Ubon Ratchathani, Thailand
- Disappeared: 4 June 2020 (aged 37); Phnom Penh, Cambodia
- Status: Missing for 6 years, 4 months and 2 days
- Education: Ramkhamhaeng University
- Occupations: NGO coordinator; Pro-democracy activist

Wanchalearm Satsaksit (Thai: วันเฉลิม สัตย์ศักดิ์สิทธิ์, RTGS: Wanchaloem Satsaksit, pronounced [wān.tɕʰā.lɤ̌ːm sàt.sàk.sìt]; born 11 August 1982) is a Thai pro-democracy activist and political exile. He was an activist for human rights in Thailand and HIV protection in various countries. Wanchalearm is an alleged lèse majesté offender according to a report released in 2015, which claimed that he took refuge in Laos.

Wanchalearm was abducted by armed men outside his home in Phnom Penh on 4 June 2020. After the news and the CCTV footage was published by Prachatai, Thai netizens and others prodded the Thai and Cambodian governments to take action on his disappearance.

== Biography ==
Wanchalearm was born in Ubon Ratchathani Province and graduated from the Faculty of Political Sciences of Ramkhamhaeng University. He was a coordinator for the Youth Activity for Community and Society Centre (Y-act), and was a member of the Pheu Thai Youths Institute of the Pheu Thai Party. During the 2013–2014 Thai political crisis, he was appointed by then Deputy Prime Minister Chalerm Yubamrung as a public relations staffer. At one point, he worked as a public relations team for then Minister of Transport Chadchart Sittipunt. He is claimed to be the person who took the iconic image of the minister walking barefoot into a temple in Surin Province that later became an internet meme.

After the coup d'état in 2014, he was charged for not appearing after a summons by the army junta. He was accused of lèse majesté in 2015. Most recently, in 2018, he was charged for a Facebook post that criticized Prayut Chan-o-cha, the prime minister and junta leader.

== Abduction ==
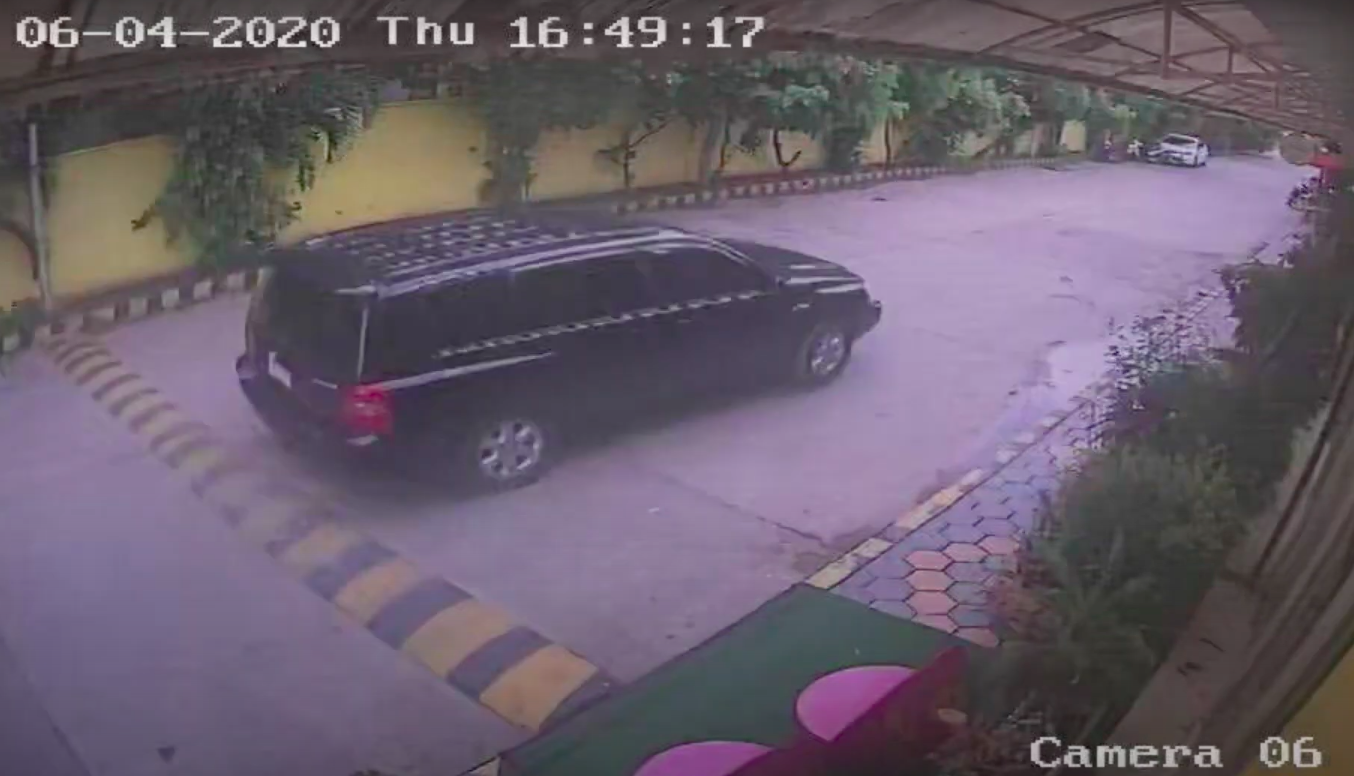
Wanchalearm Satsaksit abducted in a black van

Prachathai, a non-profit online newspaper in Thailand, reported that Wanchalearm was abducted in front of his condominium in Phnom Penh, Cambodia on 4 June 2020 at 17:54 ICT. A security guard attempted to help him but was dissuaded by the armed assailants. Wanchalearm was speaking on his phone when he was abducted and uttered the words "Ouch! I can't breathe" before the line was cut.

Cambodian police initially declined to probe the incident and claimed to know nothing of it, dismissing it as "fake news".

In June 2020, The Diplomat news reported allegations from various sources, including journalist Andrew MacGregor Marshall, that the abduction had been ordered by King Vajiralongkorn and overseen by his security chief, Jakrapob Bhuridej and his brother Jiraphop Bhuridej (also known as "Kong").

=== Activism ===
Most commentators thought that this was a case of forced disappearance committed by either the Thai or Cambodian government, given that Wanchalearm had been highly critical of PM Prayut on his Facebook page since the 2014 Thai coup d'état.

Public concern has grown since the disappearance. The United Nations Human Rights Committee told the BBC that it was following the case and was trying to force an investigation. Human Rights Watch and Amnesty International both demanded the Cambodian government investigate Wanchalearm's disappearance. Cambodian authorities, on 9 June, finally relented and announced that they would investigate the disappearance. Another group that has raised concern about the matter is The Mirror Foundation, and a number of student associations have made announcements calling for the governments to take action.

On 11 June 2020, the UN Working Group on Enforced or Involuntary Disappearances submitted a request to the Cambodian government to take urgent action on the case. The petition was submitted in accordance with the International Convention for the Protection of All Persons from Enforced Disappearance, a convention ratified by Cambodia. The committee requested that Cambodia, as a state actor, submit a list of actions taken in the case by 24 June 2020.

On 11 August 2020, Wanchalearm's family and Amnesty International Thailand visited the Cambodian Embassy in Bangkok and requested a meeting with the Cambodian Ambassador to Thailand, to obtain a progress report.

=== Thai government reaction ===
Thirty uniformed and undercover officers arrested four Thai university students at the Democracy Monument on 9 June 2020. The students, protesting the abduction of Wanchalearm, who were tying white ribbons at public places in Bangkok to call for justice in the case. The students were charged with violation of Section 12 of the 1992 Act on the Maintenance of the Cleanliness and Orderliness of the Country, which states, "no one shall scrape, chip, scratch, write, spray paint or make appear by any means" messages in public places. Violators may be fined up to 5,000 baht. They were also cited for failure to present identification as required by the 1983 National Identity Card Act. Stopped in front of the Ministry of Defence by 10 soldiers, the activists were told that their campaign was prohibited as "it was symbolic". The Bangkok Post immediately posed the question, "...why police had to crack down on the symbolic activity as it was causing no damage to public property and was unlikely to cause trouble among the general public... That would appear to be a disproportionate price to pay to maintain cleanliness in the city, especially if the outcome is increased public scrutiny of government attempts to stifle freedom of speech."

Thai Foreign Minister Don Pramudwinai said on 10 June that Wanchalearm did not have political refugee status, so Thailand could do nothing but wait for Cambodia to finish its investigation. He said that Thailand could only ask Cambodia to follow up on the case. "We cannot speculate as to his whereabouts until we receive an answer [from Cambodia]," the minister said.

== See also ==
- 2020 Thai protests
- Lèse majesté in Thailand
- List of people who disappeared mysteriously: post-1970
