= History of Thailand =

The History of Thailand begins with the earliest Bronze and Iron Age sites such as Ban Chiang around 1500 BCE. The region of present-day Thailand was inhabited by the main indigenous groups: Mon, Lawa, Khmer, and Malay in the 1st millennium. The Kra-Dai-speaking Tai tribes mass migrated from South China to Mainland Southeast Asia between the 8th-10th century. This intensified in the 13th century by pressure of the Mongol armies in China. The Tai tribes settled in northern and central areas like the city-state Lavo. The Tai people assimilated with the indigenous groups and adopted the Dvaravati culture which thrived in the city-states along the Chao Phraya Basin.

In the oldest region Northern Thailand, the main ethnic group Tai-Yuan established their own kingdoms: the semi-legendary Singhanavati Kingdom (691 BCE–638 CE) evolved into the Ngoenyang Kingdom (638–1292). In 1220, the Khmer-controlled Sukhothai was conquered by the Thais and made the capital of the Sukhothai Kingdom. Lavo was separated from the Khmer Empire by Suphannabhum princes. By 1220, the long declining Khmer Empire was mostly overrun by Thais. By the 13th century, the Sukhothai Kingdom (1238–1438) had replaced the Mon kingdoms in Central Thailand. During the reign of King Ramkhamhaeng: the Thai script was created in 1283, the arts flourished, Thai institutions were developed, and people called themselves "Thai" as freed people from foreign rule.

In 1351, the Suphannabhum city-state (modern-day Suphan Buri), and Lavo city-state (modern-day Lop Buri) merged into the Ayutthaya Kingdom (Tai-Yuan from the Northern+Monic from Chao Phra Ya river basin = Siamese Kingdom) which was founded near the Chao Phraya River. Duarte Fernandes was the first European to arrive in Ayutthaya in 1511. Ayutthaya's government was initially bilingual with Thai and Khmer. However, Thai became the lingua franca with the Fall of Angkor in 1431 and the conquest of Sukhothai in 1438.

There were 26 Burmese-Siamese wars from the 16th to the early 19th century. The Ayuthaya Kingdom collapsed when the capital Ayutthaya city was sacked during Burmese–Siamese War (1765–1767). General Taksin expunged the Burmese, reunified the 5 warring regional states and established the short-lived Thonburi Kingdom in 1767. Taksin was disposed by the Thonburi military commander Chao Phraya Chakri who subsequently founded the Rattanakosin Kingdom (1782–1932). At its greatest extent in 1805-1812 the Rattanakosin Kingdom consisted of 25 polities including modern-day Cambodia, Laos, northern Malaysia and eastern Burma.

King Mongkut (Rama IV) embraced Western innovations and initiated the modernization of Thailand. During European colonization of Southeast Asia (1511-1984) only Thailand remained independent. This was due to multiple factors: the centralizing and modernization reforms enacted by King Chulalongkorn, a political policy which balanced British and French colonial interests, King Rama V made diplomatic visits to Europe in 1897 and 1907, large territorial concessions to French Indochina, and the French and British maintained Siam as a buffer state to avoid conflicts between their colonies. An 1874 edict was issued for reforms which abolished slavery in 1905.

Siam became an ally of the United Kingdom in 1917 and joined the Allies of World War I. The Siamese revolution of 1932 ended centuries of absolute monarchy. The government changed to a constitutional monarchy with King Prajadhipok (Rama VII). The country name was formally changed to Thailand which means “Land of the Free” in 1939. The Franco-Thai War in 1940-1941 resulted in the Thai annexation of disputed territories in Cambodia and Laos of French Indochina. During World War II, Thailand was initially neutral, but joined the Axis after the Japanese invasion of Thailand on 8 December 1941. Thailand annexed disputed territories in Burma (Saharat Thai Doem), and Malaysia (Sirat Malai). After World War II these territories were ceded in return for admission to the United Nations, dropping all wartime claims and U.S. aid.

During the 70-year reign of King Bhumibol Adulyadej, Thailand had 10 coups with military governments and 17 constitutions. During the Vietnam War in 1962, Thailand permitted the United States to use bases and Thai troops fought in South Vietnam. In 1965, the CPT began the Communist insurgency which was won by the Thai Government in 1973.

Thailand was a founding member of ASEAN in 1967. The 1970s peasant revolts in Thailand to reduce the debt of farmers and for fair rice prices lead to the enactment of the Land Rent Control Act (LRCA) in Dec 1974. Thailand had unprecedented economic growth from 1993 to 1997. The 1997 Asian financial crisis caused many bankruptcies and unemployment. However, there was a quick recovery in 1998-1999. In 2000, candidates were democratically elected for the Senate for the first time. The world's largest parliamentary building; the Sappaya-Sapasathan was completed on 1 May 2021.

== Etymology ==
The name Siam (Thai: สยาม RTGS: Sayam) may have originated from Pali (suvaṇṇabhūmi, "land of gold"), Sanskrit श्याम (śyāma, "dark"), or Mon ရာမည (rhmañña, "stranger"), with likely the same root as Shan and Ahom. The Thai country name has mostly been Mueang Thai. The country's designation as Siam by Westerners likely came from the Portuguese. Portuguese chronicles noted that Borommatrailokkanat, king of Ayutthaya, sent an expedition to the Malacca Sultanate, at the southern tip of the Malay Peninsula, in 1455. Following their conquest of Malacca in 1511, the Portuguese sent a diplomatic mission to the Ayutthaya Kingdom. The explorer Duarte Fernandes was the first European to arrive in Ayutthaya in 1511. The Mandarin name for Siam is Xiān luó (Chinese: 暹罗). A century later, on 15 August 1612, The Globe, an East India Company merchantman bearing a letter from King James I, arrived in "the Road of Syam". "By the end of the 19th century, Siam had become so enshrined in geographical nomenclature that it was believed that by this name and no other would it continue to be known and styled." The country was renamed to Thailand (Thai: ประเทศไทย RTGS: Prathet Thai) which means “Land of the Free” in 1939. Thailand has been nicknamed the "Emerald Kingdom", the "Land of the White Elephant", the "Rice bowl of Asia", and the "Land of Smiles". The elephant is a Thai national symbol and treasure. Thailand's geographic shape resembles an elephant's head with a long trunk.

== Prehistory ==
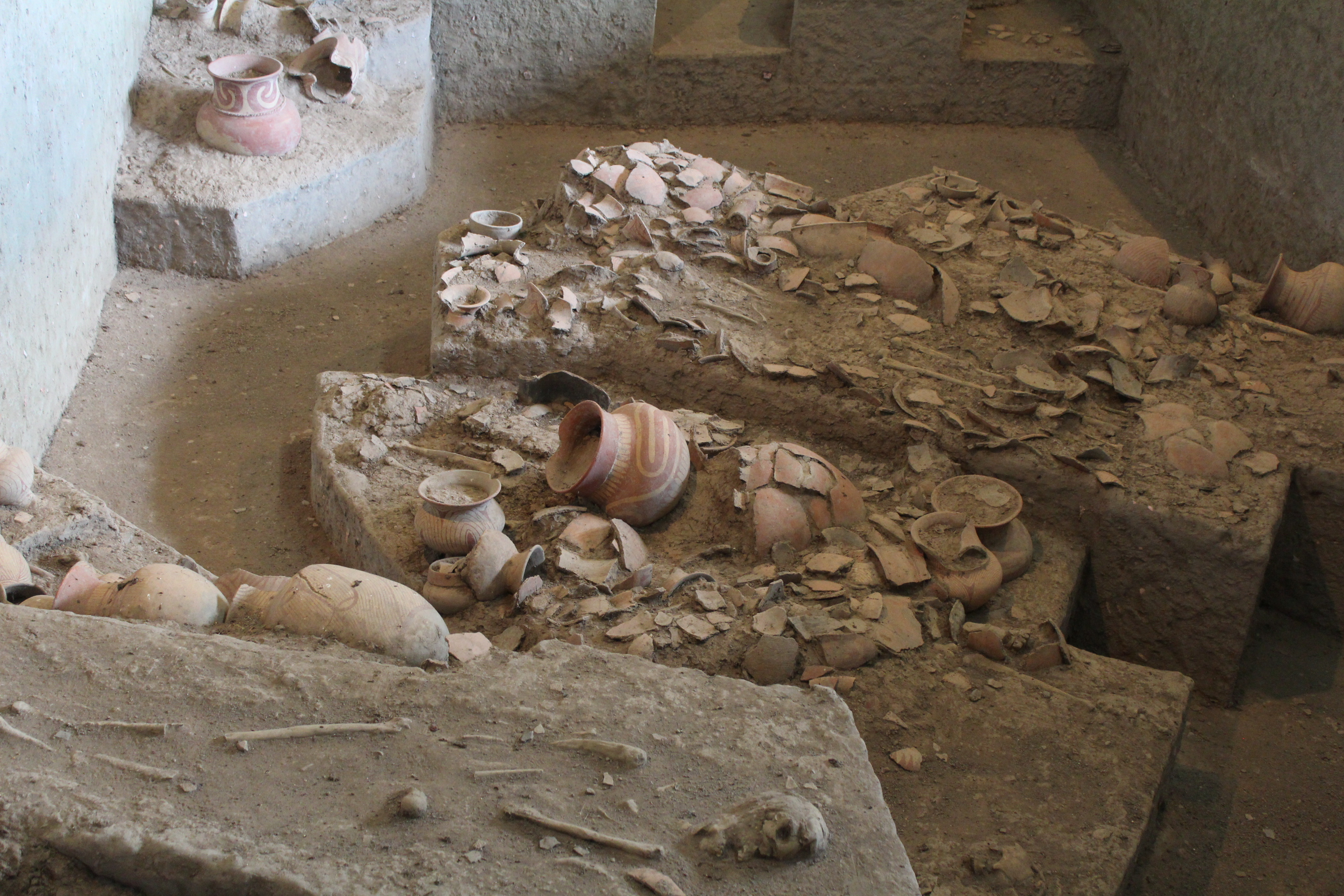
Buried people with pots during funeral rites of Wat Pho Si Nai.

Mainland Southeast Asia was home to various indigenous communities for up to 100,000 years. The discovery of Homo erectus fossils such as Lampang man is an example of archaic hominids. The remains were first discovered during excavations in Lampang Province. The finds have been dated from roughly 1,000,000–500,000 years ago in the Pleistocene. Stone artefacts dating to 40,000 years ago have been recovered from, e.g., Tham Lod rockshelter in Mae Hong Son and Lang Rongrien Rockshelter in Krabi, peninsular Thailand. The archaeological data between 18,000 and 3,000 years ago primarily derive from cave and rock shelter sites, and are associated with Hoabinhian foragers.

=== Bronze Age ===
There are many sites in present-day Thailand dating to the Bronze (1500–500 BCE) and Iron Ages (500 BCE–500 CE). Areas comprising what is now Thailand participated in the Maritime Jade Road, as ascertained by archeological research. The trading network existed for 3,000 years, between 2000 BC and 1000 AD. The site of Ban Chiang (around Udon Thani Province) currently ranks as the earliest known of copper and bronze production in Southeast Asia and has been dated to around 2,000 years BCE. Around 1500 BCE, there was independent human cultural, social, and technological evolution in the Ban Chiang area which later spread widely over the region.

== Ancient history ==
=== Initial states ===
Mainland Southeast Asia in the first millennium map

The oldest known records of a political entity in Indochina are attributed to Funan, located in the Mekong Delta and comprising territories inside modern-day Thailand. Chinese annals confirm Funan's existence as early as the first century CE. Archaeological documentation implies an extensive human settlement history since the fourth century BCE.

The region was inhabited by a number of indigenous Austroasiatic-speaking and Malayo-Sumbawan-speaking civilisations. By the first millennium the region was inhabited by the primary groups: the Austroasiatic Lawa in the north, Mon in the center, Khmer in the east and the Austronesian Malay in Langkasuka of the Malay Peninsula. However, literary and concrete sources about Thailand before the 13th century are scarce, and most of the knowledge about this period is gleaned from archaeological evidence. Similar to other regions in Southeast Asia, Thailand was heavily influenced by the cultures and religions of India and Sri Lanka, starting with the Funan Kingdom, around the first century, until the Khmer Empire. These kingdoms were composed of Dvaravati, Srivijaya, and the Khmer Empire. E. A. Voretzsch believes that Buddhism must have been flowing into Thailand from India at the time of the Indian emperor Ashoka of the Maurya Empire and into the first millennium. Later, Thailand was influenced by the south Indian Pallava dynasty and north Indian Gupta Empire.

=== Central Thailand ===
Dvaravati

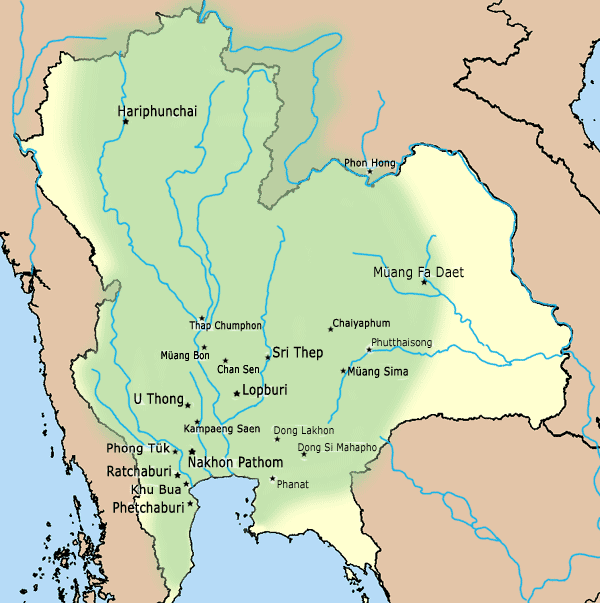
Territory of Dvaravati.

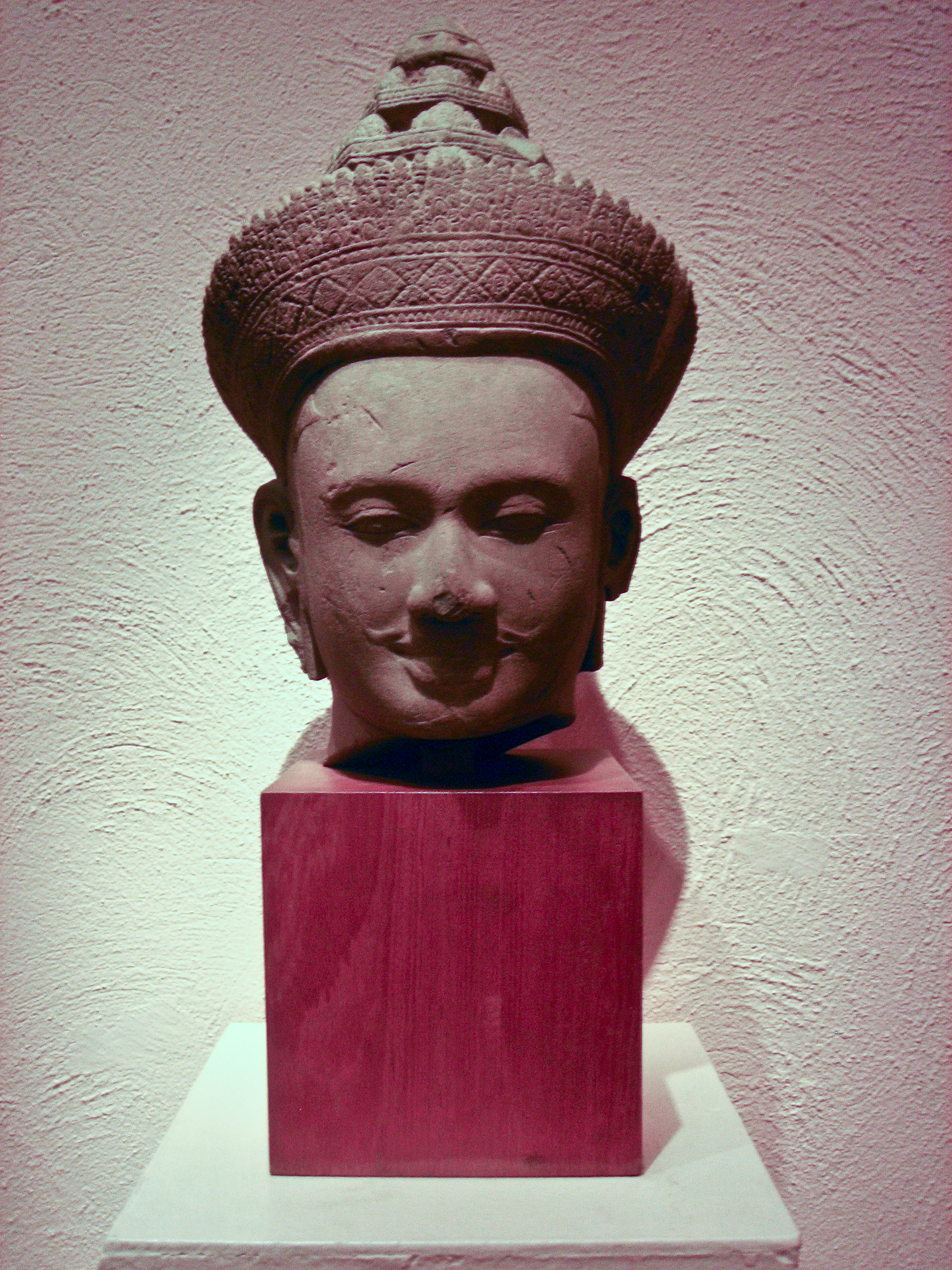
Khmer period sculpture of Vishnu c. tenth century CE.

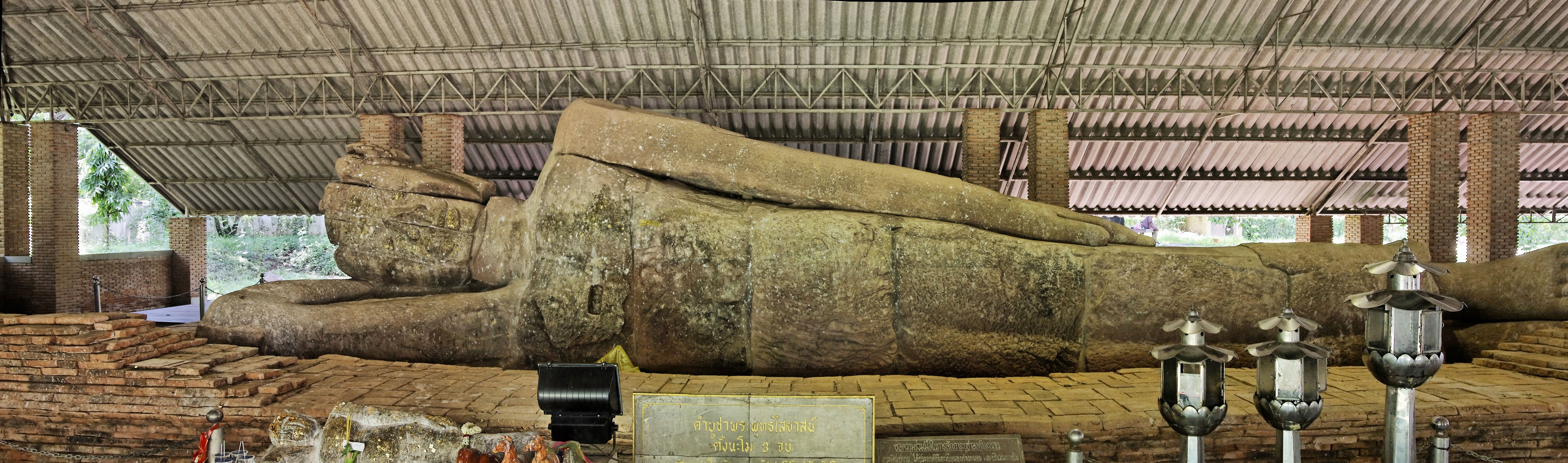
A 13 meter long reclining Buddha, Nakhon Ratchasima.

The Chao Phraya Basin (now Central Thailand) was home of the Mon people's Dvaravati culture, which prevailed from the seventh century to the tenth century. Samuel Beal discovered the polity among the Chinese writings on Southeast Asia as "Duoluobodi". During the early 20th century, archaeological excavations led by George Coedès found Nakhon Pathom Province to be a centre of Dvaravati culture. The two most important sites were Nakorn Pathom and U Thong (in modern Suphan Buri Province). The inscriptions of Dvaravati were in Sanskrit and Mon using the script derived from the Pallava alphabet of the South Indian Pallava dynasty.

It is believed that the Dvaravati borrowed Theravada Buddhism through its contacts with Sri Lanka, while the ruling class participated in Hindu rites. Dvaravati art, including the Buddha sculptures and stupas, showed strong similarities to those of the Gupta Empire of India. The eastern parts of the Chao Phraya valley were subjected to a more Khmer and Hindu influence as the inscriptions are found in Khmer and Sanskrit.

Dvaravati was a network of city-states paying tribute to more powerful ones according to the mandala political model. Dvaravati culture expanded into Isan as well as south as far as the Kra Isthmus. Dvaravati culture lost its influence around the tenth century when they submitted to the more unified Lavo-Khmer polity.

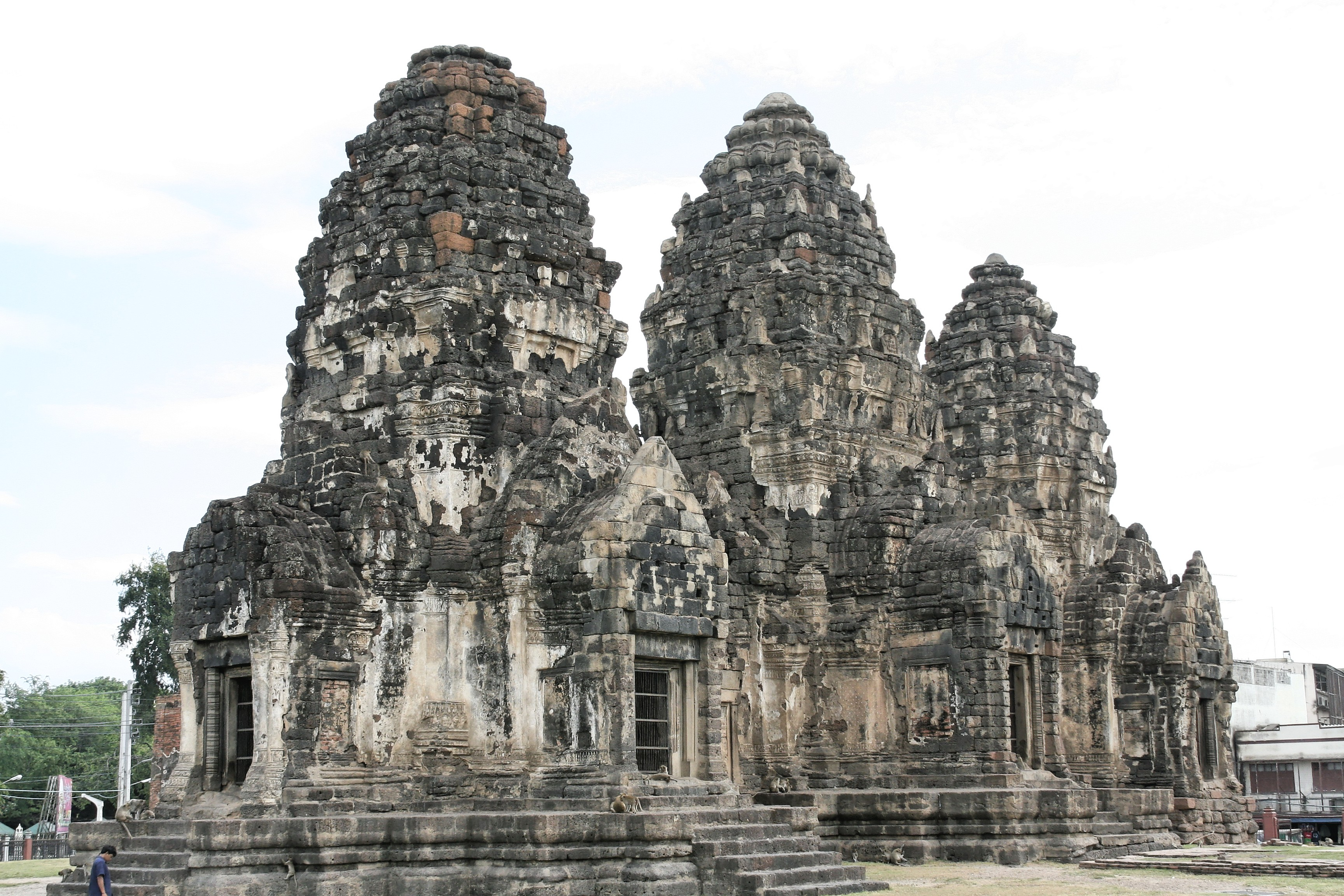
The Khmer temple of Wat Phra Prang Sam Yod, Lopburi.

Around the tenth century, the city-states of Dvaravati merged into the mandalas of: Lavo (modern Lopburi) and Suvarnabhumi (modern Suphan Buri). According to a legend in the Northern Chronicles, in 903, a king of Tambralinga invaded and took Lavo and installed a Malay prince on the Lavo throne. The Malay prince was married to a Khmer princess who had fled an Angkorian dynastic bloodbath. The son of the couple contested the Khmer throne and became Suryavarman I (1006–1050), thus bringing Lavo under Khmer domination through marital union. Suryavarman I also expanded into the Khorat Plateau (later styled "Isan"), constructing many temples.

Suryavarman, however, had no male heirs and Lavo again became independent. After the death of King Narai of Lavo, the Lavo kingdom was plunged into a bloody civil war. The Khmer Empire under Suryavarman II took advantage by invading Lavo and installed his son as the King of Lavo. The repeated but discontinued Khmer domination eventually Khmerized Lavo. Lavo was transformed from a Theravadin Mon Dvaravati city into a Hindu Khmer one. Lavo became the entrepôt of Khmer culture and power of the Chao Phraya river basin. The bas-relief at Angkor Wat shows a Lavo army as one of the subordinates to Angkor. One interesting note is that a Tai army was shown as part of the Lavo army, a century before the establishment of the Sukhothai Kingdom.

=== Northern Thailand ===
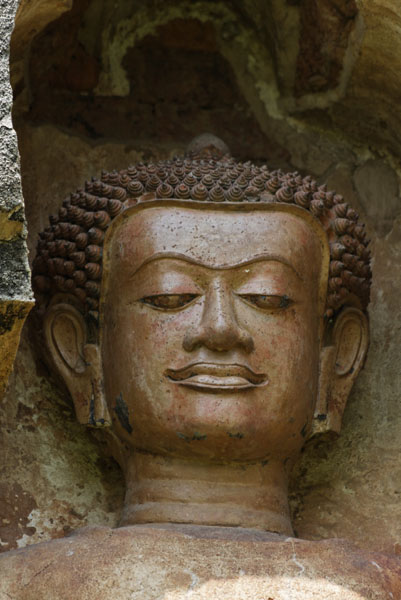
A Buddha from Wat Kukkut, Lamphun

According to the Cāmadevivaṃsa, the city of Hariphunchai (modern Lamphun) was founded by hermits. Camadevi, a princess of the Lavo Kingdom, was invited to rule the city around 700. Hariphunchai may be a later (10th century) offshoot of the Lavo Kingdom or instead related to the Thaton Kingdom.

Hariphunchai was the centre of Theravada in the north. The kingdom flourished during the reign of King Attayawong who built Wat Phra That Hariphunchai in 1108. The kingdom had strong relations with the Mon Kingdom of Thaton. During the 11th century, Hariphunchai waged lengthy wars with the Tai Ngoenyang Kingdom of Chiang Saen. Weakened by Tai invasions, Hariphunchai eventually fell in 1293 to Mangrai, king of Lan Na, the successor state of the Ngoenyang Kingdom.

=== Southern Thailand ===
Malay civilisations dominated the area below the Kra Isthmus. Early Malay kingdoms are described as tributaries to Funan by second-century Chinese sources, though most of them proved to be tribal organisations instead of full-fledged kingdoms. From the sixth century on, two major mandalas partially ruled Southern Thailand, the Kanduli and Langkasuka. Kanduli centred on what is now Surat Thani Province and Langkasuka in Pattani Province.

Southern Thailand was the centre of Hinduism and Mahayana Buddhism. The 7th century Tang monk Yijing stopped at Langkasuka to study Pali grammar and Mahayana during his journey to India. At that time, the kingdoms of Southern Thailand quickly fell under the influences of the Malay kingdom of Srivijaya from Sumatra. The Tamil King Rajendra Chola I of the Chola dynasty invaded Tambralinga in the 11th century.

== Feudal Thailand ==
These are notable feudal Thai kingdoms and city-states.

Thai Kingdoms and city-states	Established	Location
Ngoenyang	638–1292	Northern Thailand
Lavo Kingdom	648–1388	Central Thailand
Phrae city-state	828–1444	Northern Thailand
Suphannabhum city-state	913–1438	Central Thailand
Phayao Kingdom	1094–1338	Northern Thailand
Phrip Phri Kingdom	1188–1351	Central Thailand
Sukhothai Kingdom	1238–1438	Most of modern Thailand including northern Laos and Southcoast of Burma.
Nan kingdom	1269–1461	Northern Thailand
Lan Na	1296–1775	Northern Thailand
Nakhon Si Thammarat Kingdom	13th century–1782	Southern Thailand
Ayutthaya Kingdom	1351-1767	Most of modern Thailand, north until the border with China.
Thonburi Kingdom	1767-1782	Included Thailand, Laos and Cambodia

=== Arrival of the Tais ===
Map showing linguistic family tree overlaid on a geographic distribution map of Tai-Kadai family. This map only shows general pattern of the migration of Tai-speaking tribes, not specific routes, which would have snaked along the rivers and over the lower passes.

The Tai people originated from South China. There are theories that the migrants primarily came from Guangxi. A large number of Tai people known as the Zhuang still live in Guangxi today. The Tai people are also closely related to the Dai people of Yunnan. Around 700 AD, Tai people who did not come under Chinese influence settled in what is now Điện Biên Phủ in modern Vietnam according to the Khun Borom legend. Based on layers of Chinese loanwords in proto-Southwestern Tai and other historical evidence, Pittayawat Pittayaporn (2014) proposed that this migration must have taken place sometime between the eighth–10th centuries. Tai speaking tribes migrated southwestward along the rivers and over the lower passes into Southeast Asia, perhaps prompted by the Chinese expansion and suppression. Chinese historical texts record that, in 722, 400,000 'Lao' (Note: The term "Lao" used in this context refers to Tai-Kadai speaking peoples resided in what are now Guangdong, Guangxi, and northern Vietnam in general. It is not necessarily applied solely to the ancestor of the Lao.) rose in revolt behind a leader who declared himself the king of Nanyue in Guangdong. After the 722 revolt, some 60,000 were beheaded. In 726, after the suppression of a rebellion by a 'Lao' leader in the present-day Guangxi, over 30,000 rebels were captured and beheaded. In 756, another revolt attracted 200,000 followers and lasted four years. In the 860s, many local people in what is now North Vietnam sided with attackers from Nanchao, and in the aftermath, some 30,000 of them were beheaded. In the 1040s, a powerful matriarch-shamaness by the name of A Nong, her chiefly husband, and their son, Nong Zhigao, raised a revolt, took Nanning, besieged Guangzhou for 57 days, and slew the commanders of five Chinese armies sent against them before they were defeated, and many of their leaders were killed. As a result of these three bloody centuries, the Tai began to migrate southwestward. The Tai people settled in the Northern and Central regions. They adopted the Dvaravati culture and assimilated with the indigenous peoples in the 8th-10th century. They continuously spoke Kra–Dai languages which evolved into Thai with the writing system by King Ramkhamhaeng in 1283.

=== Early kingdoms ===
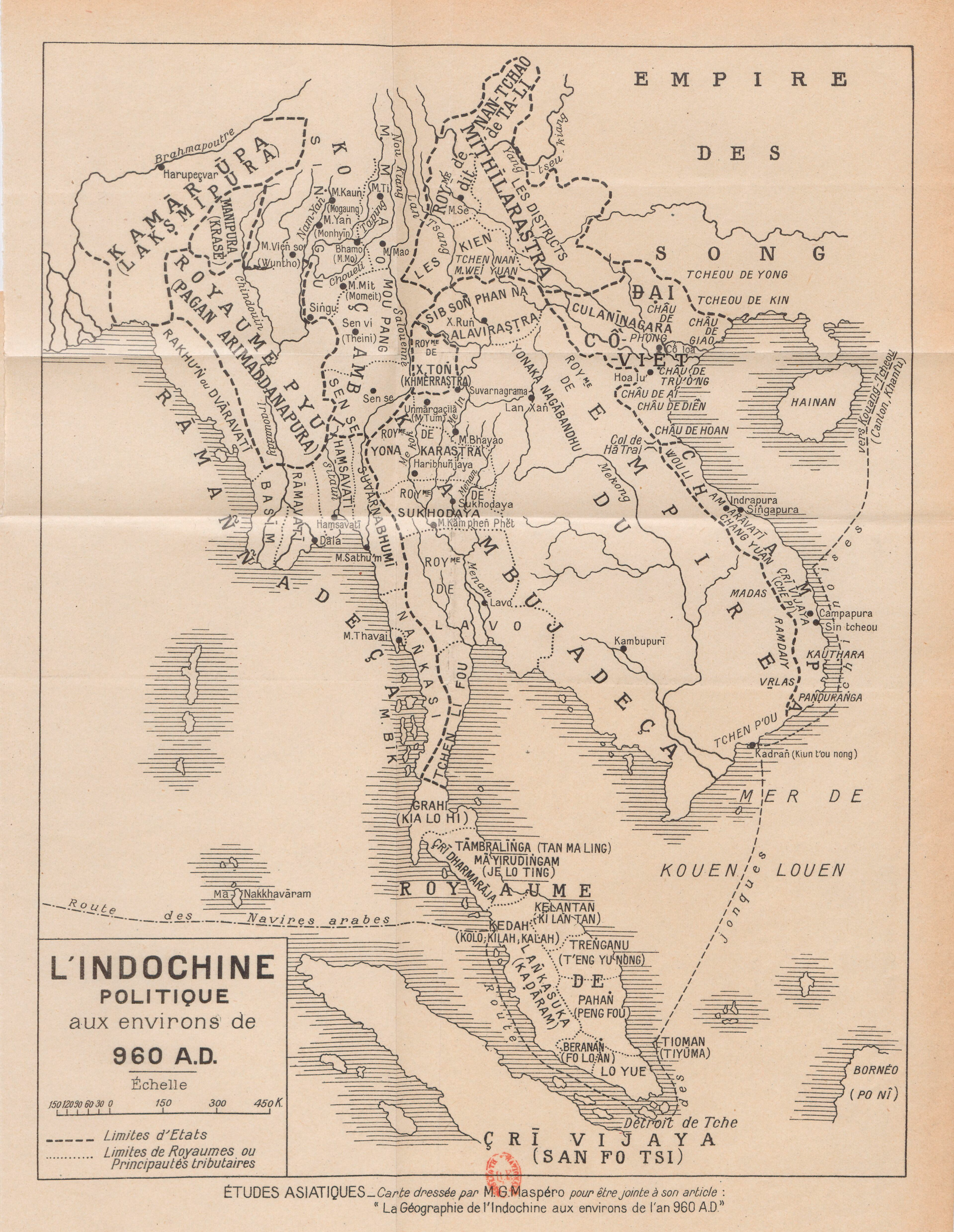
Indochina political map, 960 AD

The Simhanavati legend tells us that a Tai chief named Simhanavati drove out the native Wa people and founded the city of Chiang Saen around 800 CE. For the first time, the Tai people made contact with the Theravadin Buddhist kingdoms of Southeast Asia. Through Hariphunchai, the Tais of Chiang Saen embraced Theravada Buddhism and Sanskrit royal names. Wat Phrathat Doi Tong, constructed around 850, signified the piety of Tai people on the Theravada Buddhism. Around 900, major wars were fought between Chiang Saen and Hariphunchai. Mon forces captured Chiang Saen and its king fled. In 937, Prince Prom the Great took Chiang Saen back from the Mon and inflicted severe defeats on Hariphunchai.

Around 1000 CE, Chiang Saen was destroyed by an earthquake with many inhabitants killed. A council was established to govern the kingdom for a while, and then a local Wa man known as Lavachakkaraj was elected king of the new city of Chiang Saen or Ngoenyang. The Lavachakkaraj dynasty would rule over the region for about 500 years.

Overpopulation might have encouraged the Tais to seek their fortune further southwards. By 1100 CE, the Tai had established themselves as Po Khuns (ruling fathers) at Phayao, Nan, Phrae, Song Kwae, Sawankhalok, and Chakangrao on the upper Chao Phraya River. These southern Tai princes faced Khmer influence from the Lavo Kingdom. Some of them became subordinate to it. Suphannabhum was an important Siamese city-state founded circa 1150. It was located in Central Thailand, present-day Suphan Buri. The Suphannabhum Kingdom became a tributary state of the Sukhothai Kingdom from 1283–1298.

== Sukhothai period (1238–1438) ==
Sukhothai Kingdom

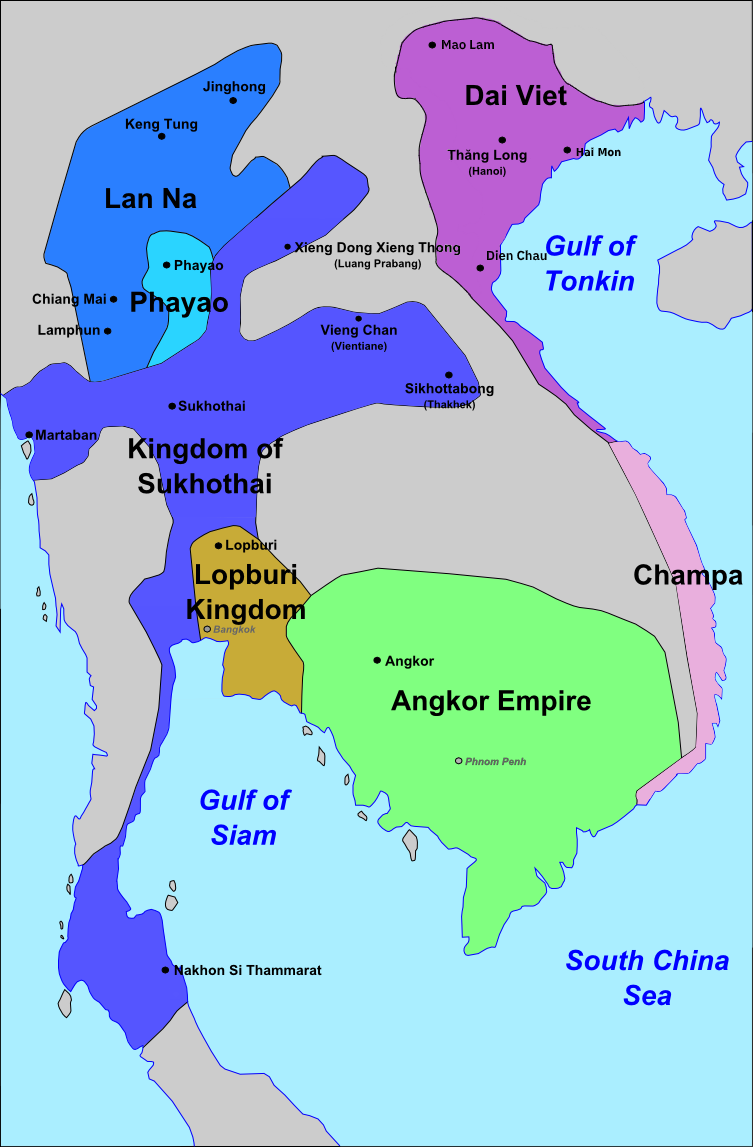
Spheres of influence in mainland Southeast Asia, end of 13th century CE.

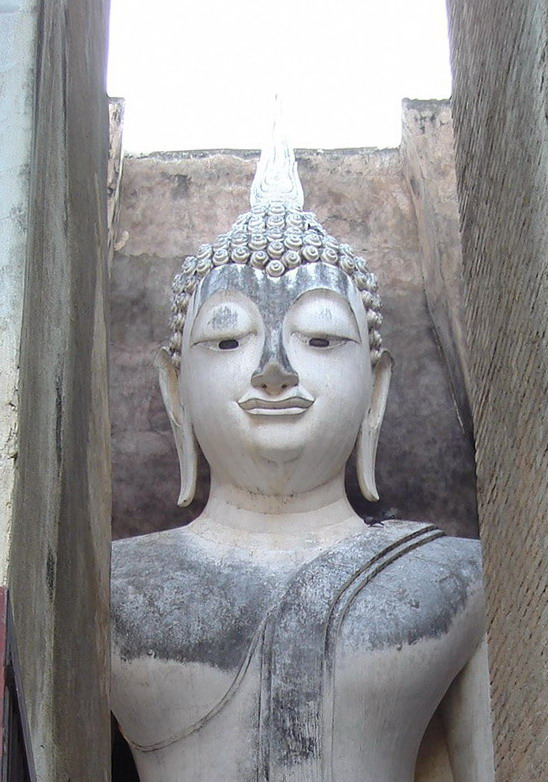
Phra Achana, Wat Si Chum, Sukhothai Historical Park.

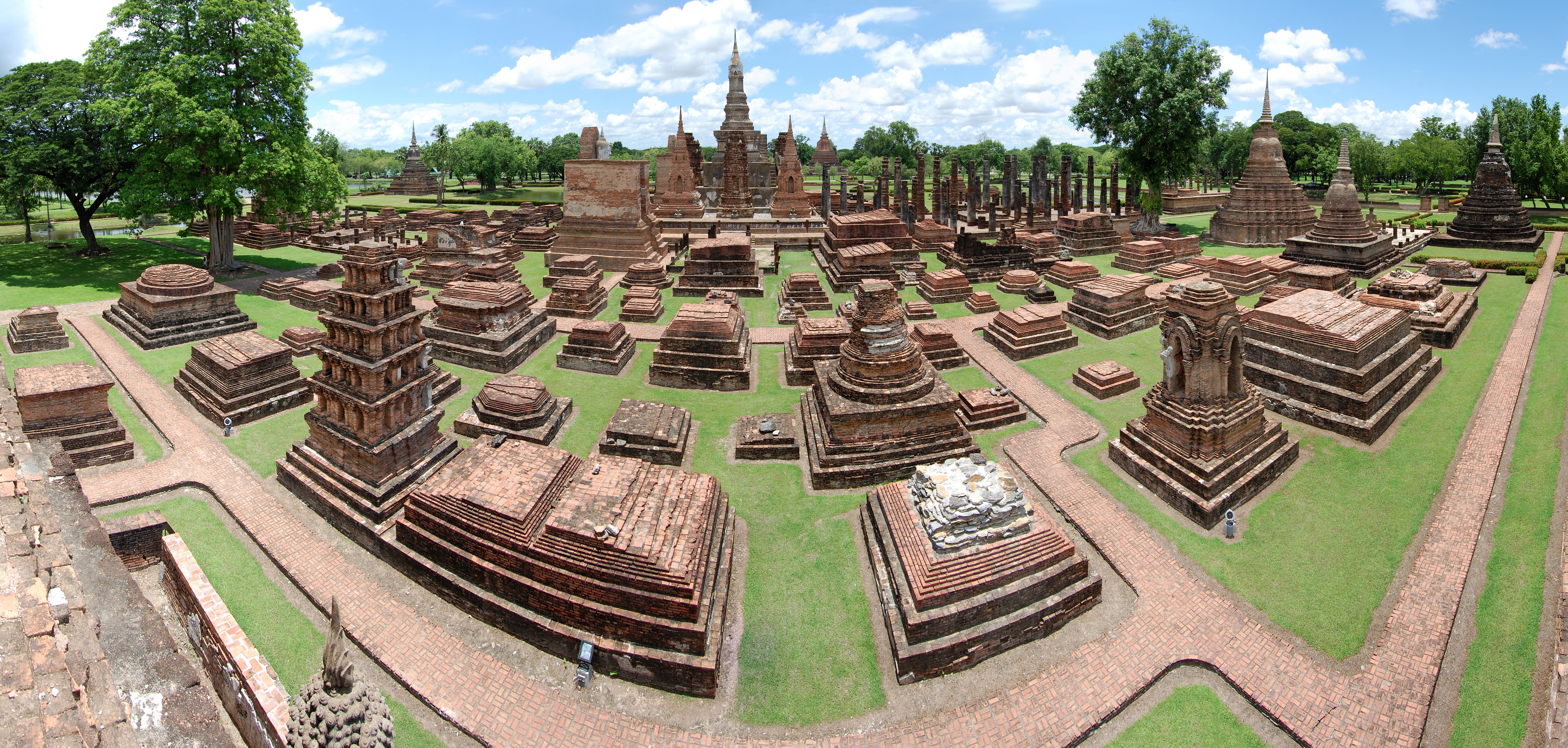
The ruins of Wat Mahathat, Sukhothai Historical Park.

Multiple Thai city-states gradually became independent of the weakened Khmer Empire. Sukhothai was established as a strong sovereign kingdom by Si Inthrathit in 1238 CE. A political feature which "classic" Thai historians call "father governs children" existed at this time. Everybody could bring their problems to the king directly, as there was a bell in front of the palace for this purpose. The inception of a unified Thai identity evolved during the reign of King Ramkhamhaeng (1279-1298). Tradition and legend states the Thai script was created by Ramkhamhaeng. The architecture of Sukhothai (stone buildings and statues) were based on techniques and styles provided by the former Mon kingdoms. The kingdom expanded northward to the Lao cities of Lan Chang (Luang Prabang) and Vien Chan (Vientiane) in the Mekong valley. Sukhothai also conquered the Malay Peninsula until Nakhon Sri Thammarat. However, after his death in 1365, Sukhothai fell into decline and became subject to the emerging Ayutthaya Kingdom in the lower Chao Phraya River area. The 13th century had mass migration waves of Tai people who fled from the Mongol armies in China.

Lan Na emerged as a city-state in the same period as Sukhothai. The Lan Na kingdom was founded by King Mangrai in the late 13th century. Mangrai established the capital city Chiang Mai in Northern Thailand. Evidently, Lan Na coexisted and became closely allied with Sukhothai. Ayutthaya Kingdom expanded its influence from the Chao Phraya Basin and finally subdued Sukhothai. Fierce battles between Lan Na and Ayutthaya occurred constantly and Chiang Mai was eventually subjugated as a vassal of Ayutthaya.

Lan Na's independent history ended in 1558 when it fell to Burmese control. Local leaders rose up against the Burmese with the help of the rising Thonburi Kingdom of King Taksin. The "Northern City-States" became autonomous vassals of Thonburi in 1774–1775. The Lan Na dynasty ended when the region was formally incorporated by the Rattanakosin Kingdom around 1874.

== Ayutthaya period (1351–1767) ==
Ayutthaya Kingdom

Ayutthaya's zones of influence and neighbours, c. 1540 CE.

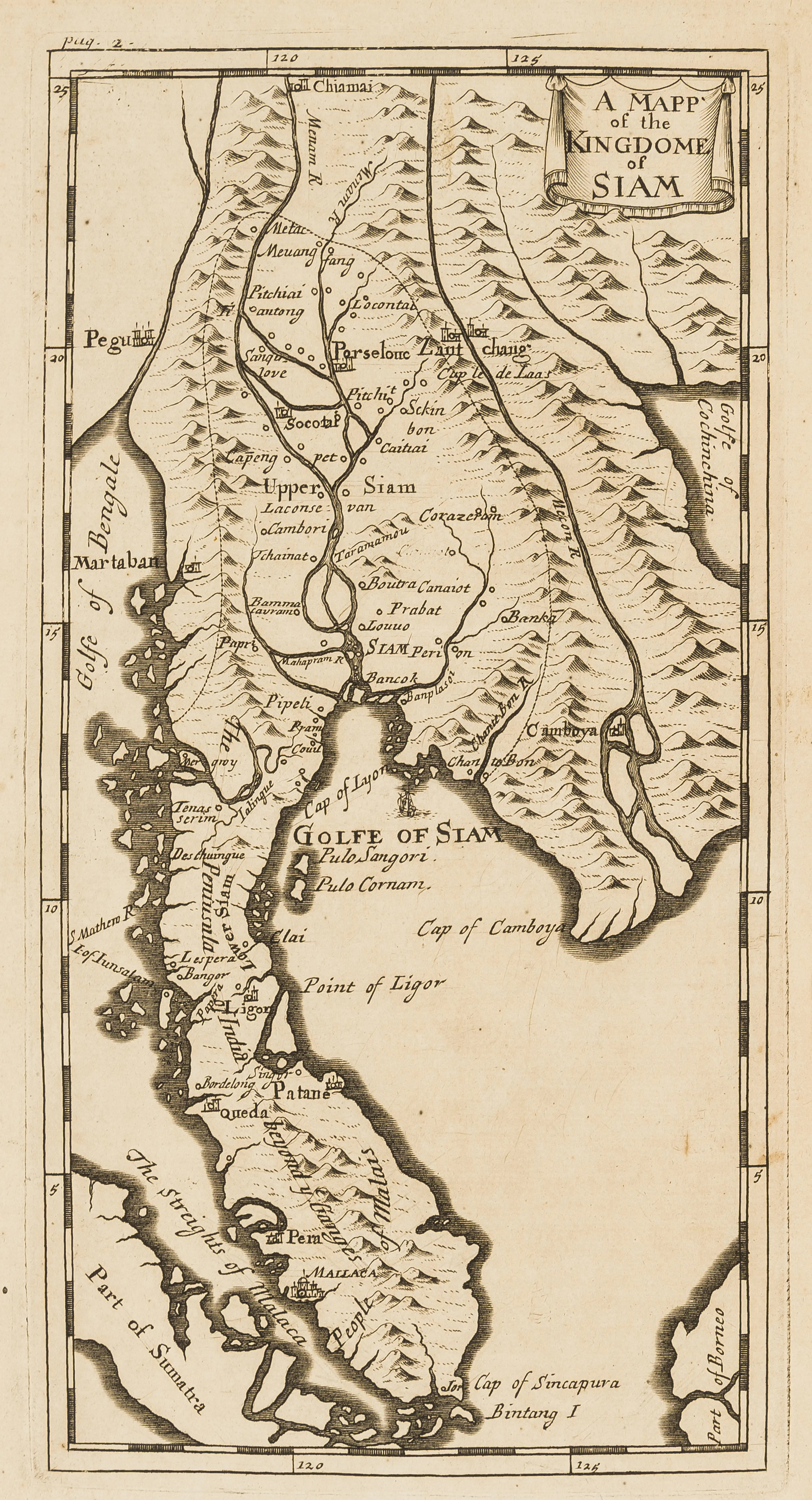
Kingdom of Siam Map (Thailand) in 1693 by Simon de la Loubère

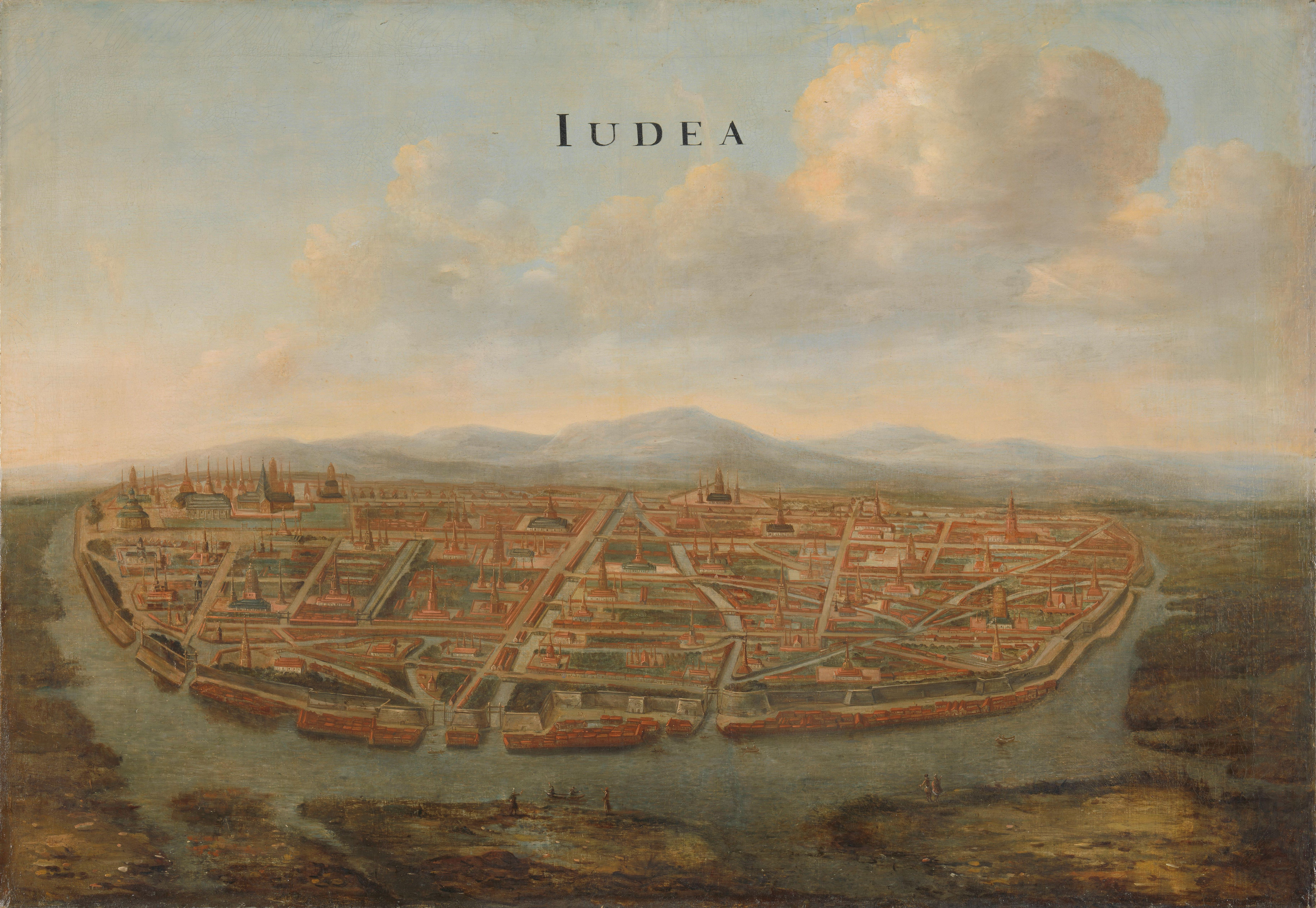
Painting of Ayutthaya, commissioned by the Dutch East India Company, Amsterdam.

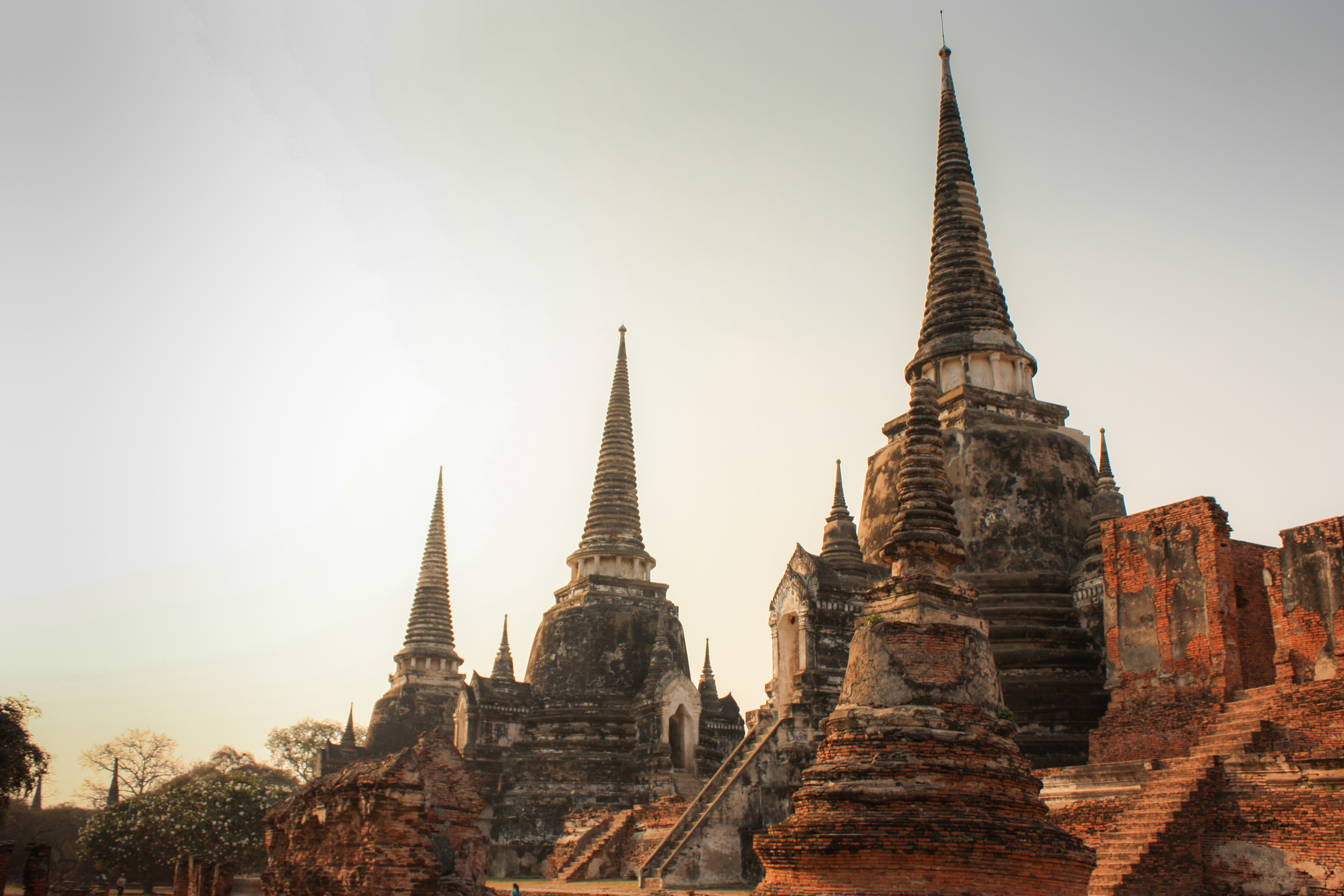
Wat Phra Si Sanphet, Ayutthaya.

Social hierarchy in the Ayutthaya era.

Ayutthaya was founded as a port city on a small island at the confluence of the Chao Phraya, the Pa Sak, and the Lopburi river. The name Ayutthaya is derived from the legendary Indian city Ayodhya in Sanskrit texts. Due to its strategic and defensible location, Ayutthaya quickly became powerful, politically, and economically.

The Kingdom of Ayutthaya was established in 1351 by King Uthong (r. 1351–1369) when he centralized power and integrated the Lavo Kingdom, Suphannaphum, and Ayutthaya City. King Uthong's most important contributions to Thai history were: the establishment and promotion of Theravada Buddhism as the official religion to differentiate his kingdom from the neighbouring Hindu Khmer Empire of Angkor, and the compilation of the Dharmaśāstra, a legal code based on Hindu sources and traditional Thai custom. The Dharmaśāstra remained a tool of Thai law until the late 19th century.

=== Sakdina system ===
The Sakdina (Thai: ศักดินา) system of social hierarchy was established at the beginning of the Ayutthaya Kingdom. It assigned a numerical rank (rai) to each person depending on their status. This determined their position in society. There were 6 classes in society: the king, royal family, nobility, monks, commoners and slaves. The king was an absolute monarch and owned all the land. The king granted control of the land to his subjects. The nobility had important leading roles. The learned Buddhist monks were above commoners. The lowest class were various slaves. The numbers represented the number of rai of land a person was entitled to own. In practice it indicated the number of people under control. The sakdina system was used for around 600 years till the early era of the Rattanakosin Kingdom.

=== Golden age ===
In 1511 Duke Afonso de Albuquerque dispatched Duarte Fernandes as an envoy to the Ayutthaya Kingdom, known then to Europeans as the "Kingdom of Siam". Fernandes was the first European to formally arrive in Siam and establish diplomatic relations in 1511. This contact with the West during the 16th century led to a period of economic growth as lucrative trade routes were established. Ayutthaya became one of the most prosperous cities in Southeast Asia. According to George Modelski, Ayutthaya is estimated to have been the largest city in the world in 1700 CE, with a population around one million. International trade flourished; the Dutch and Portuguese merchants were among the most active western foreigners in the kingdom together with the Chinese and Malayans. Luzones merchants and warriors from Luzon, the Philippines were also present. Philippines-Thailand relations already had precursors in that, Thailand often exported ceramics to several Filipino states as evidenced that when the Magellan expedition landed at the Cebu Rajahnate, they noted a Thai embassy to the king, Rajah Humabon. When the Spanish colonized the Philippines via Latin America, Spaniards and Mexicans joined the Filipinos in trading at Thailand.

The Ayutthaya Period is known as the golden age of Thai literature, art and trade with the eastern and western world. The Ayutthaya period was also considered as "a golden age of medicine in Thailand" due to major progress in the field of medicine at that time.

=== Burmese wars ===
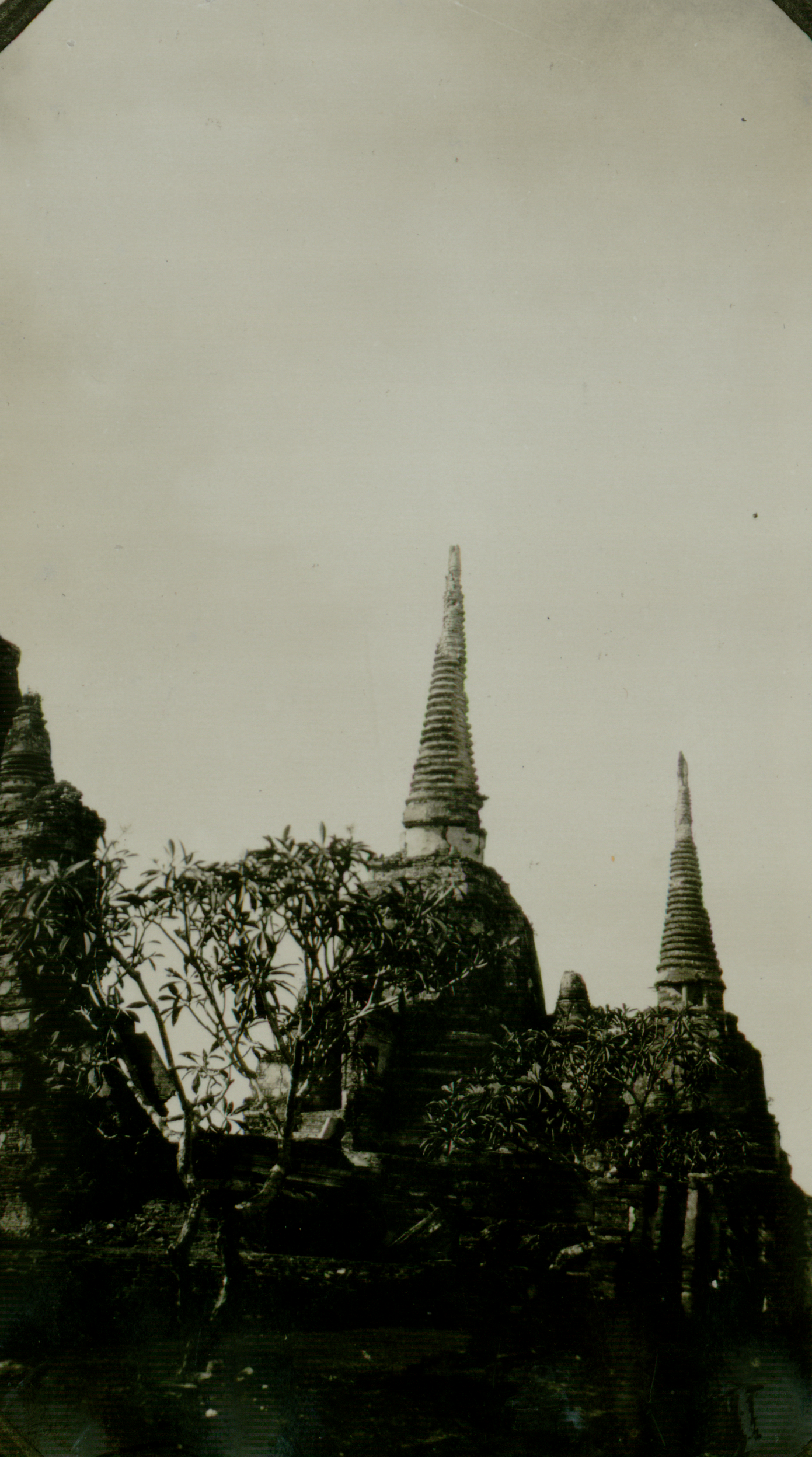
The ruins of Ayutthaya city was completely buried beneath a mass of jungle vegetation in 1930.

Starting in the middle of the 16th century, the kingdom came under repeated attacks by the Taungoo Dynasty of Burma. The Burmese–Siamese War (1547–49) began with a Burmese invasion and a failed siege of Ayutthaya. A second siege (1563–64) led by King Bayinnaung forced King Maha Chakkraphat to surrender in 1564. The royal family was taken to Bago, Burma, with the king's second son Mahinthrathirat installed as a vassal king. In 1568, Mahinthrathirat revolted when his father managed to return from Bago as a Buddhist monk. The ensuing third siege captured Ayutthaya in 1569 and Bayinnaung made Mahathammarachathirat his vassal king.

After Bayinnaung's death in 1581, Uparaja Naresuan proclaimed Ayutthaya's independence in 1584. The Thai fought off repeated Burmese invasions (1584–1593), capped by an elephant duel between King Naresuan and Burmese heir-apparent Mingyi Swa in 1593 during the fourth siege of Ayutthaya in which Naresuan famously slew Mingyi Swa. The Burmese–Siamese War (1594–1605) was a Thai attack on Burma, resulting in the capture of the Tanintharyi Region as far as Mottama in 1595 and Lan Na in 1602. Naresuan even invaded mainland Burma as far as Taungoo in 1600, but was driven back.

Ayutthaya expanded its sphere of influence over a considerable area, ranging from the Islamic states on the Malay Peninsula, the Andaman seaports of present-day India, the Angkor kingdom of Cambodia, to states in northern Thailand. In the 18th century, the power of the Ayutthaya Kingdom gradually declined as fighting between princes and officials plagued its politics. Outlying principalities became more and more independent, ignoring the capital's orders and decrees.

In the 18th century, the last phase of the kingdom arrived. The Bamar people, who had taken control of Lan Na and had also unified their kingdom under the powerful Konbaung Dynasty, launched several blows against Ayutthaya in the 1750s and 1760s. Finally, in 1767, after several months of siege, the Burmese broke through Ayutthaya's outer and inner walls, sacked the city, and burned it down. The royal family fled the city and Ayutthaya's last king, Ekkathat, died of starvation ten days later while in hiding.

== Thonburi period (1767–1782) ==
=== Reunification by Taksin ===
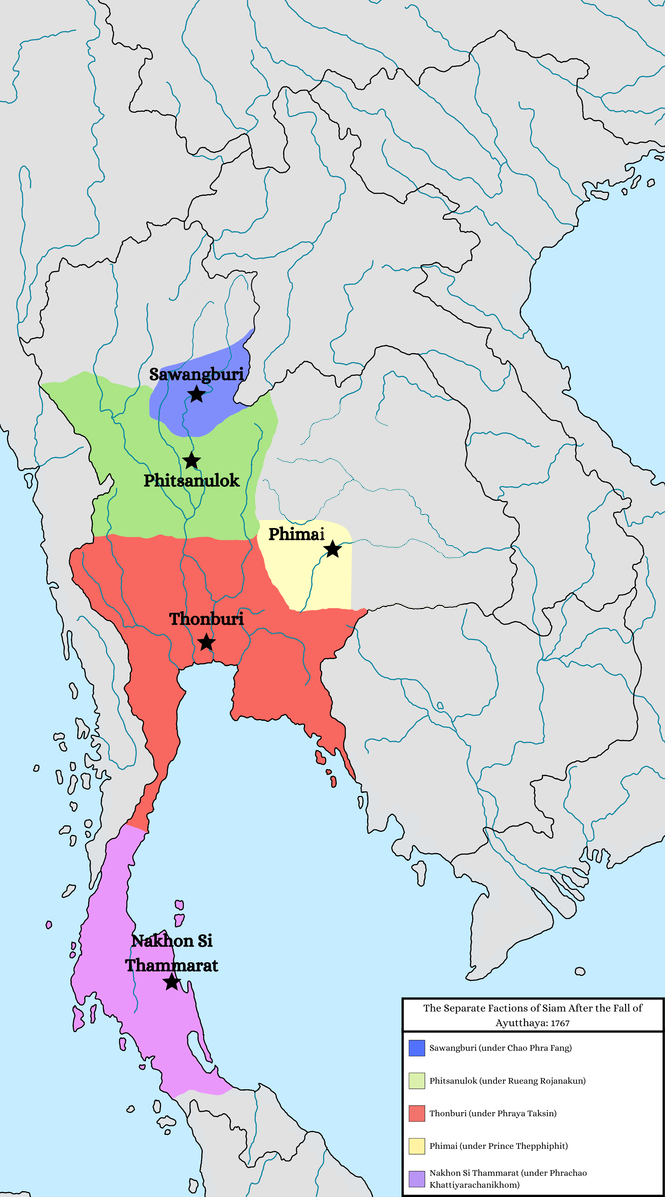
Five states of Siam that emerged from the dissolution of the Ayutthaya Kingdom in 1767

After more than 400 years of power, in 1767, the Kingdom of Ayutthaya was brought down by invading Burmese armies, its capital destroyed, and the territory split. Despite its complete defeat and occupation by Burma, Siam made a rapid recovery. The resistance to Burmese rule was led by the noble military leader Taksin. He travelled first to the town Chonburi, and then to Rayong, where he raised a small army. He made a surprise attack on Chanthaburi and captured it on 15 June 1767. Taksin's army grew rapidly. Within a year he had defeated the Burmese occupation army and re-established a Siamese state with its capital at Thonburi on the west bank of the Chao Phraya, 20 km from the Gulf of Thailand. In 1767 he was crowned as King Taksin (now officially known as "Taksin the Great").

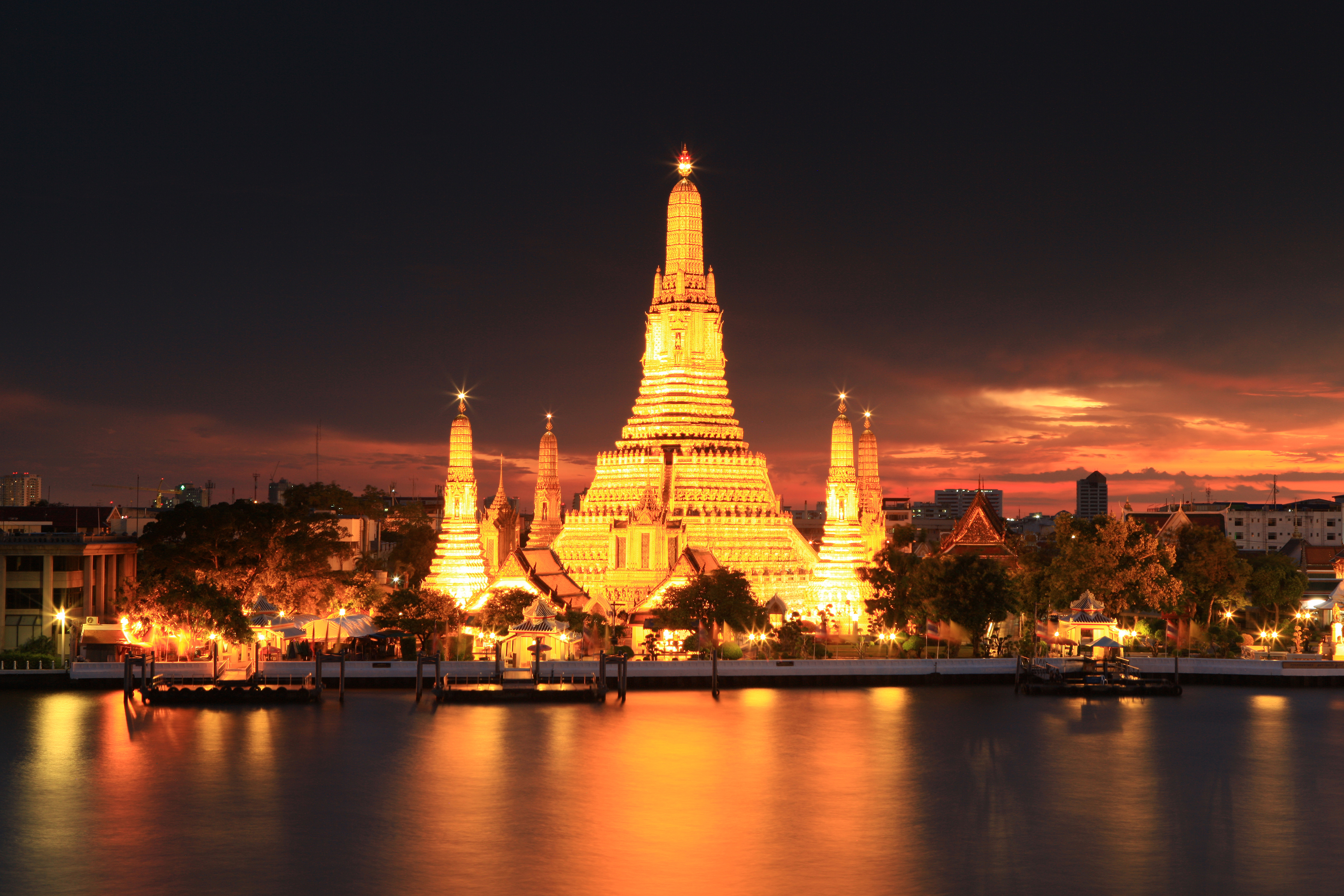
Wat Arun was originally a small temple called Wat Makok built in the 17th century. The central prang was completed around 1851.

After the sacking of Ayutthaya, the country fell apart due to the lack of a central authority. Besides King Taksin, who had organised his force in the southeastern provinces, four other claimants and warlords had seized power and set up their own sphere of influence. Prince Thepphiphit, King Boromakot's son, who had been unsuccessful in a diversionary action against the Burmese in 1766, had set himself up as the ruler of Phimai holding sway over the eastern provinces including Nakhon Ratchasima or Khorat. The Governor of Phitsanulok, whose first name was Ruang, had proclaimed himself independent, with the territory under his control extending to the province of Nakhon Sawan. A Buddhist monk named Ruan made himself a prince, appointing fellow monks as army commanders, at the town of Sawangburi (known as Fang in Uttaradit Province). Previously, He had pursued Buddhist studies at Ayutthaya with such excellent results that he had been appointed the chief monk of Sawangburi by King Boromakot. In the southern provinces as far north as Chumphon, a Pra Palad who was the acting Governor of Nakhon Si Thammarat declared his independence and raised himself to a princely rank.

Having firmly established his power at Thonburi, King Taksin set out to reunify the old kingdom, crushing regional rivals. After a temporary repulse by the Governor of Phitsanulok, he concentrated on the defeat of the weakest warlord first: Prince Thepphiphit of Phimai was subjugated and executed in 1768. Chao Narasuriyawongse, one of Taksin's nephews, replaced Thepphiphit as governor. The last so-called ruler who still challenged the King was the Prince of Sawangburi (Ruan) or Chao Pra Fang, as he had just annexed Phitsanulok on the death of its Governor. King Taksin himself led an expedition against him and took it, but the prince disappeared. In dealing with the Prince of Nakhon Si Thammarat, who was taken prisoner by the loyal Governor of Pattani, the king not only pardoned him but also favoured him with a residence at Thonburi.

In the Thonburi period, the beginning of the Chinese mass immigration fell to Siam. Through the availability of Chinese workers, trade, agriculture and craftsmen flourished. However, the first Chinese rebellions had to be suppressed. However, later due to stress and many factors, King Taksin supposedly suffered mental breakdowns. After a coup d'état removing Taksin from power, stability was restored by Chaophraya Chakri (later King Rama I). Taksin was sentenced to death on Wednesday, 10 April 1782.

== Rattanakosin period (1782–1932) ==
=== Restoration under Rama I ===
Rattanakosin period

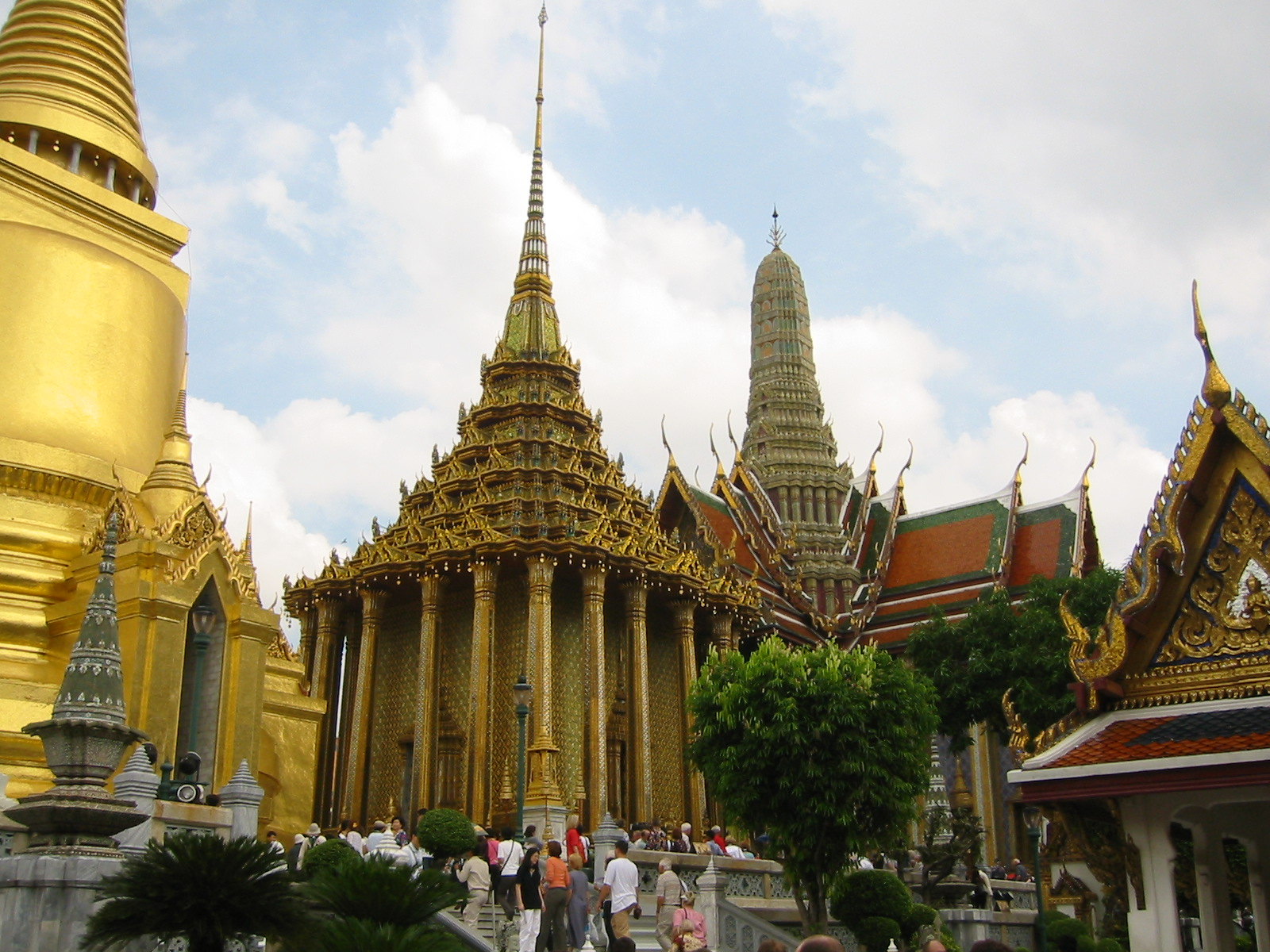
The Temple of the Emerald Buddha, one of the king's many construction projects.

Greatest extent of Rattanakosin's orbit (c. 1805)

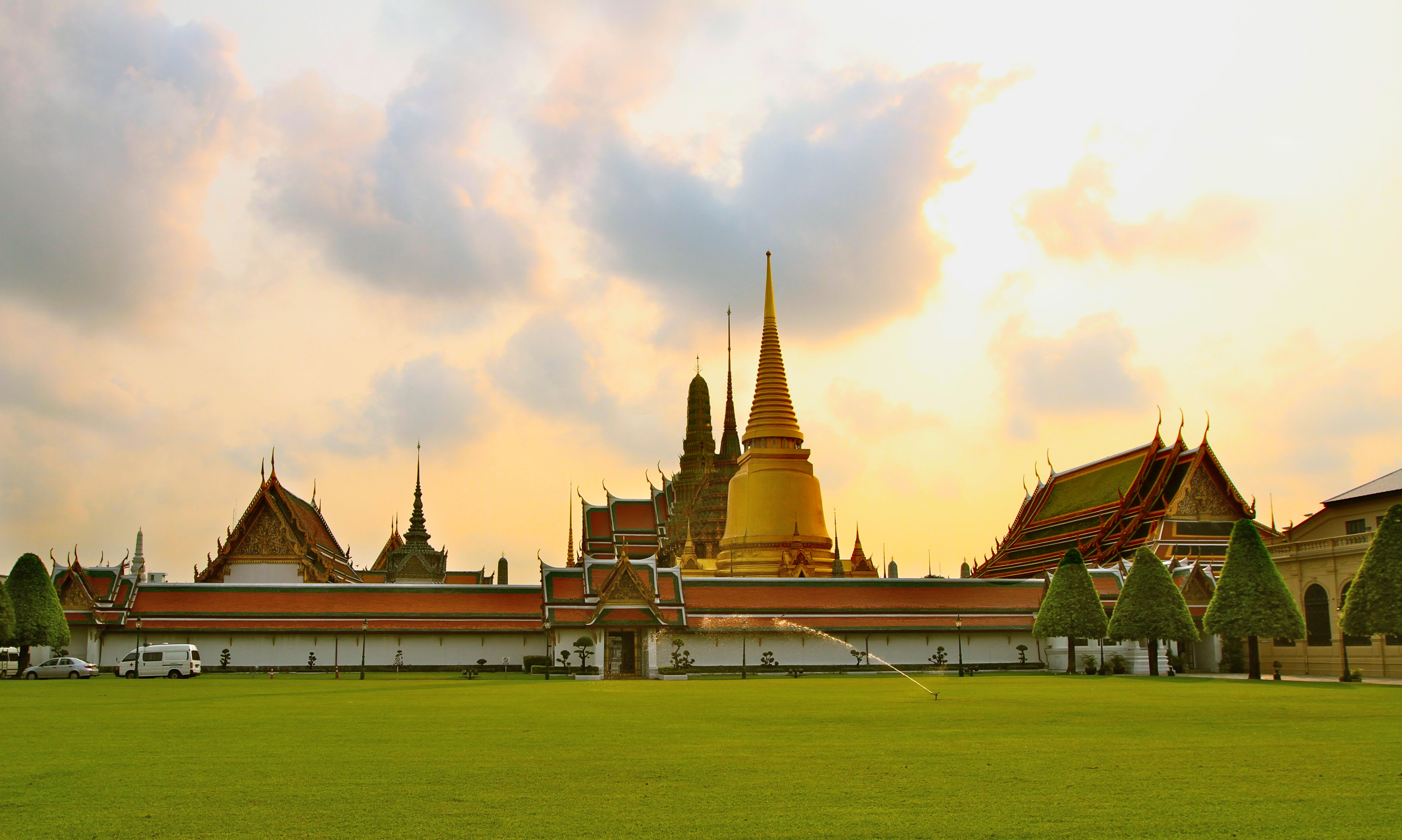
Wat Phra Kaew or the Temple of the Emerald Buddha as seen from the Outer Court of Grand Palace.

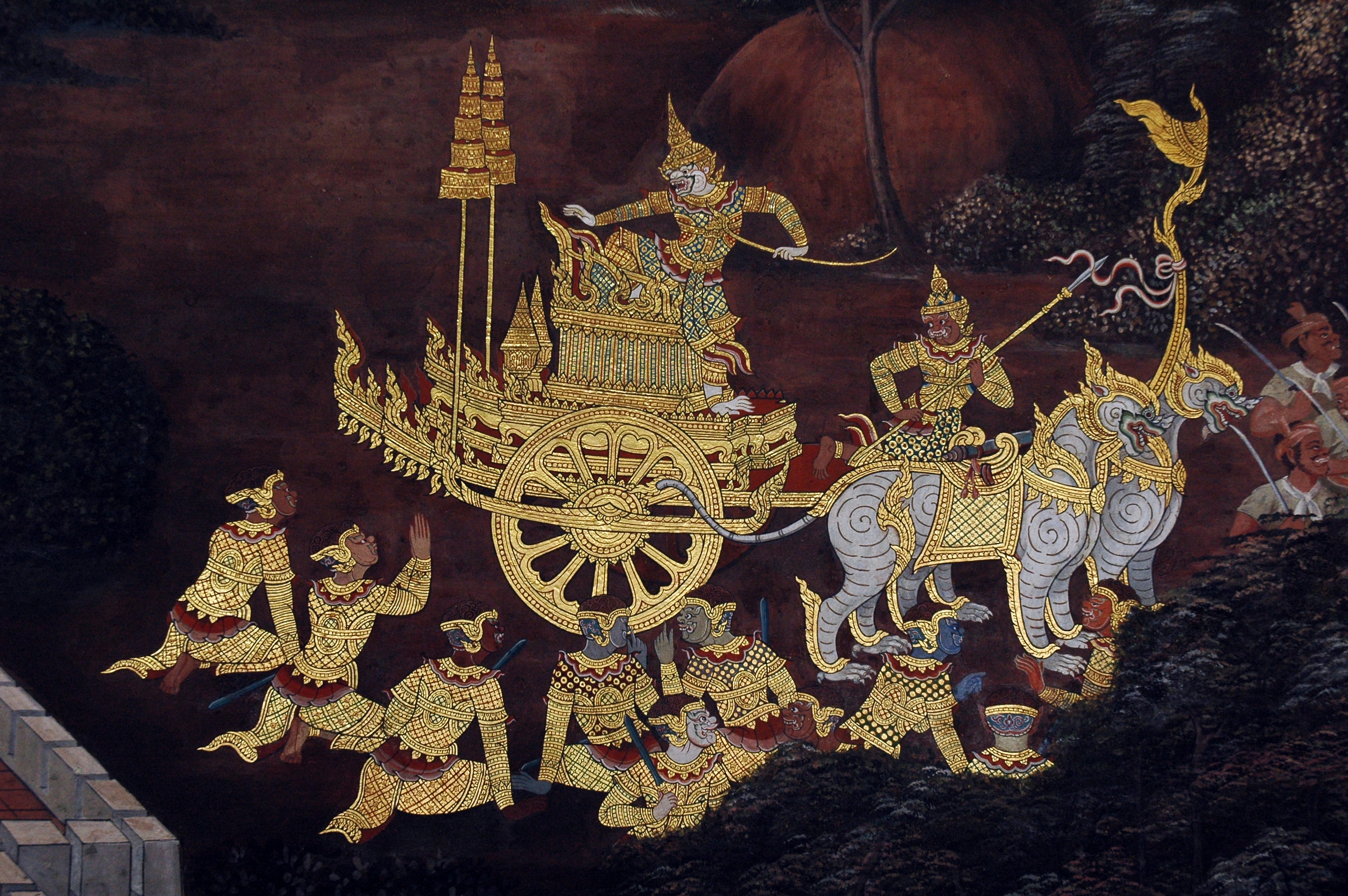
Hanuman on his chariot, a mural scene from the Ramakien in Wat Phra Kaew.

A noble of Mon descent, General Chakri succeeded Taksin on 6 April 1782 as Rama I (Phra Phutthayotfa), the first king of the Chakri dynasty. In the same year he founded a new capital city across the Chao Phraya River in an area known as Rattanakosin Island. (While settlements on both banks were commonly called Bangkok, both the Burney Treaty of 1826 and the Roberts Treaty of 1833 refer to the capital as the City of Sia-Yut'hia.) In the 1790s, Burma was defeated and driven out of Siam, as it was then called. Lan Na also became free of Burmese occupation, but was reduced to the Kingdom of Chiang Mai. The king of the new dynasty was installed as a tributary ruler of the Chakri monarch.

It is probable that Chakri and his family had planned his ascent to the throne during his predecessor Taksin's reign. After his coronation, he operated a systematic bloody extermination of the followers of Taksin, which corresponds to the typical approach of the usurpers in Thai history.

The new dynasty moved the capital of Thonburi to Rattanakosin Island, in today's Bangkok. Bangkok had previously been a small settlement with a fort, but it was strategically located on the eastern shores of the Chao Phraya river and was known among the foreign traders as the 'key to Siam'. New palaces and temples were built: construction of the Grand Palace and Wat Phra Kaew, where the Emerald Buddha is held, began. The king's goal was to transfer the old splendor of Ayutthaya to the new capital. In his new capital, Rama I crowned himself in 1785 in a splendid ceremony.

During the reign of Rama I, the foreign policy was still focused on the threat of Burma. In 1786, Burma's new king Bodawpaya ordered the nine Burmese armies in a surprise attack against Siam. The Burmese army invaded through the Three Pagoda Pass. The war came to be known as the "Nine Armies' Wars". However, the Siamese were victorious. In 1805 Lanna (North Thailand) was largely brought under control of Bangkok. Rama I also attempted unsuccessfully to conquer the important trading ports of Tenasserim.

At the time of Rama I, Cambodia was practically administered as a province of Siam, as rival Vietnam had to deal with internal problems. Only when the new Vietnamese emperor Gia Long had ascended to the throne was the influence of Siam in Cambodia again contested. Relations with Vietnam took on a prominent place in this epoch, as there was yet to be significant relations with the European colonial powers during the reign of Rama I.

One of the most important achievements of Rama I was the codification of all the country's laws into a work of 1,700 pages called the Three Seals Law. This law remained valid in its basic traits until the beginning of the twentieth century.

Siam also had a high level of cultural achievement. The Buddhist canon (Pāli Canon) was collected and reformulated within the framework of a Grand Council. The arts were promoted, as well as the construction of new palaces and temples in the capital. Literature and theatre also thrived: important works such as the 3,000-page Ramakian epic were produced. Additionally, works from Chinese, Mon, Javanese, Persian, and Indian languages were translated into Thai.

Although Rama I continued the traditions of Ayutthaya in many respects, the new empire was more centralized than its predecessors. A particularly important innovation was the stronger emphasis on rationality in the relationship between the monarch and his subjects. Rama I was the first king in the history of the country who justified his decisions before the highest officials.

=== Maintaining the status quo under Rama II and Rama III ===
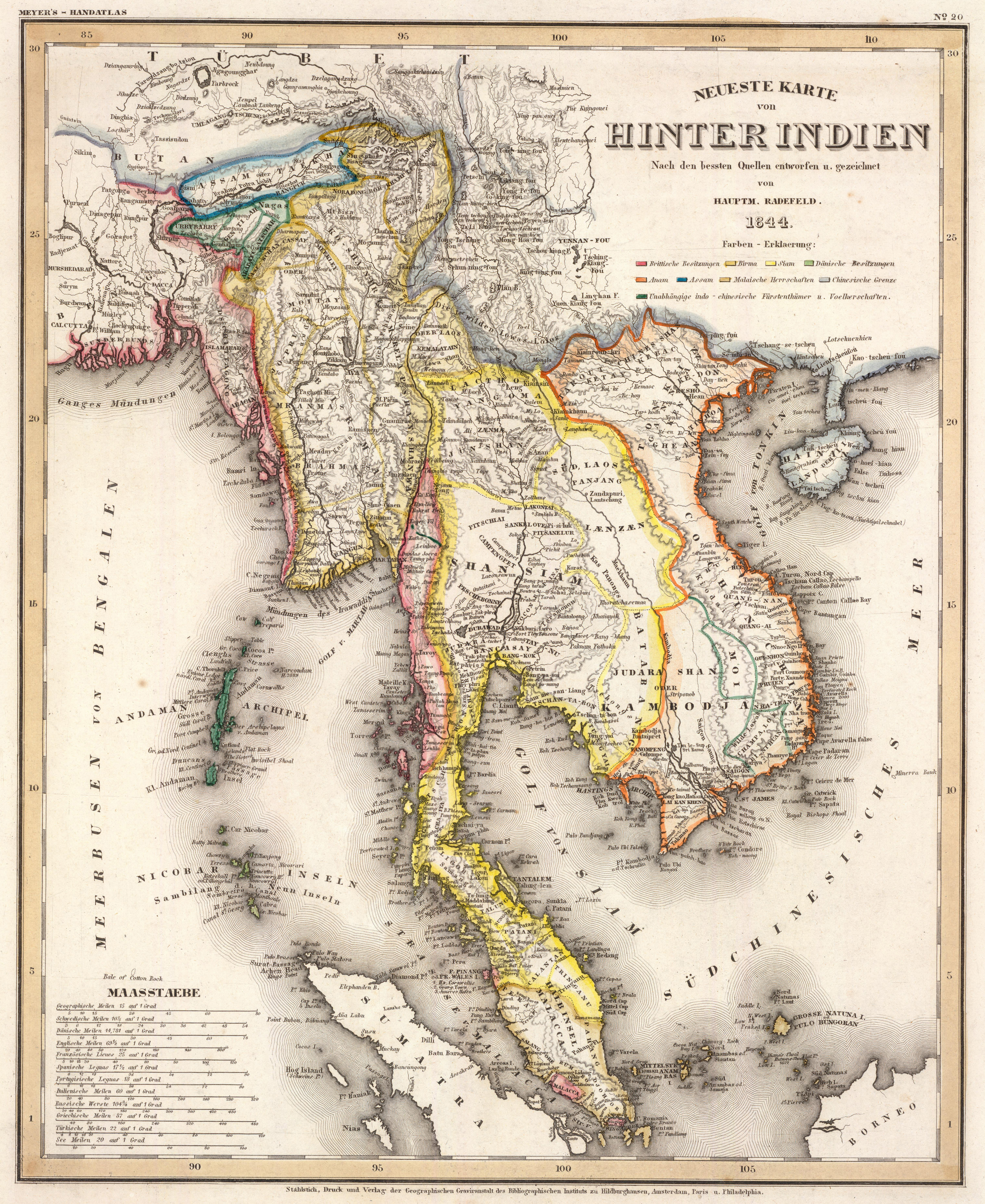
Mainland Southeast Asia Map in 1844 by Carl Radefeld, before French colonization of Annam

King Rama II (Phra Phutthaloetla) was the son of Rama I. His accession to the throne was accompanied by a plot, during which 40 people were killed. The calmness of the interior and the exterior, which during the reign of Rama II and his successor Rama III (Phra Nangklao), prevailed mainly through giving in to conflicts and building good relations with influential clans in the country.

During Rama II's reign, the kingdom saw a cultural renaissance after the massive wars that plagued his predecessor's reign; particularly in the fields of arts and literature. Poets employed by Rama II included Sunthorn Phu the drunken writer (Phra Aphai Mani) and Narin Dhibet (Nirat Narin).

Foreign relations were initially dominated by relations with the neighbouring states, while those with European colonial powers started to enter in the background. In Cambodia and Laos, Vietnam gained the supremacy, a fact which Rama II initially accepted. When a rebellion broke out in Vietnam under Rama III in 1833–34, he tried to subdue the Vietnamese militarily, but this led to a costly defeat for the Siamese troops. In the 1840s, however, the Khmer themselves succeeded in expelling the Vietnamese, which subsequently led to the greater influence of Siam in Cambodia. At the same time, Siam kept sending tribute to China.

There was a serious touch with British colonial interests when Siam conquered the Sultanate Kedah on the Malay Peninsula in 1821. Kedah belonged to the sphere of interest of Great Britain. In the following year, Siam had to recognise the pre-conquest status after tough negotiations with the British envoy John Crawfurd. There was also the cautious resumption of trade and missionary activity in this epoch. In particular, British traders such as Robert Hunter ("discoverer" of the conjoined brothers Chang and Eng, the original "Siamese twins") or James Hayes, but also missionaries from Europe and the United States like Jacob Tomlin, Karl Gützlaff, Dan Beach Bradley and Jean-Baptiste Pallegoix became active in Siam. In 1825 an agreement was signed with British emissary Henry Burney; Siam recognised British colonial possessions on the Malay Peninsula and made commercial concessions. This agreement was due not least to the rapid British success in the First Anglo-Burmese War.

A potentially dangerous event occurred with the Anouvong's Rebellion in 1827, when the troops of the tributary King Anouvong of the Kingdom of Vientiane advanced towards Bangkok. They were, however, destroyed, which strengthened the position of Siam in Laos. The Lao-population of the areas west of the Mekong were relocated to Thai provinces in Isan.

Under Rama II and Rama III, culture, dance, poetry and above all the theatre reached a climax. The temple Wat Pho was built by Rama III, known as the first university of the country.

The reign of Rama III was finally marked by a division of the aristocracy with regard to foreign policy. A small group of advocates of the takeover of Western technologies and other achievements were opposed by conservative circles, which proposed a stronger isolation instead. Since the kings Rama II and Rama III, the conservative-religious circles largely stuck with their isolationist tendency.

The death of Rama III in 1851 also signified the end of the old traditional Siamese monarchy: there were already clear signs of profound changes, which were implemented by the two successors of the king.

=== Modernization under Rama IV and Rama V (1851–1910) ===
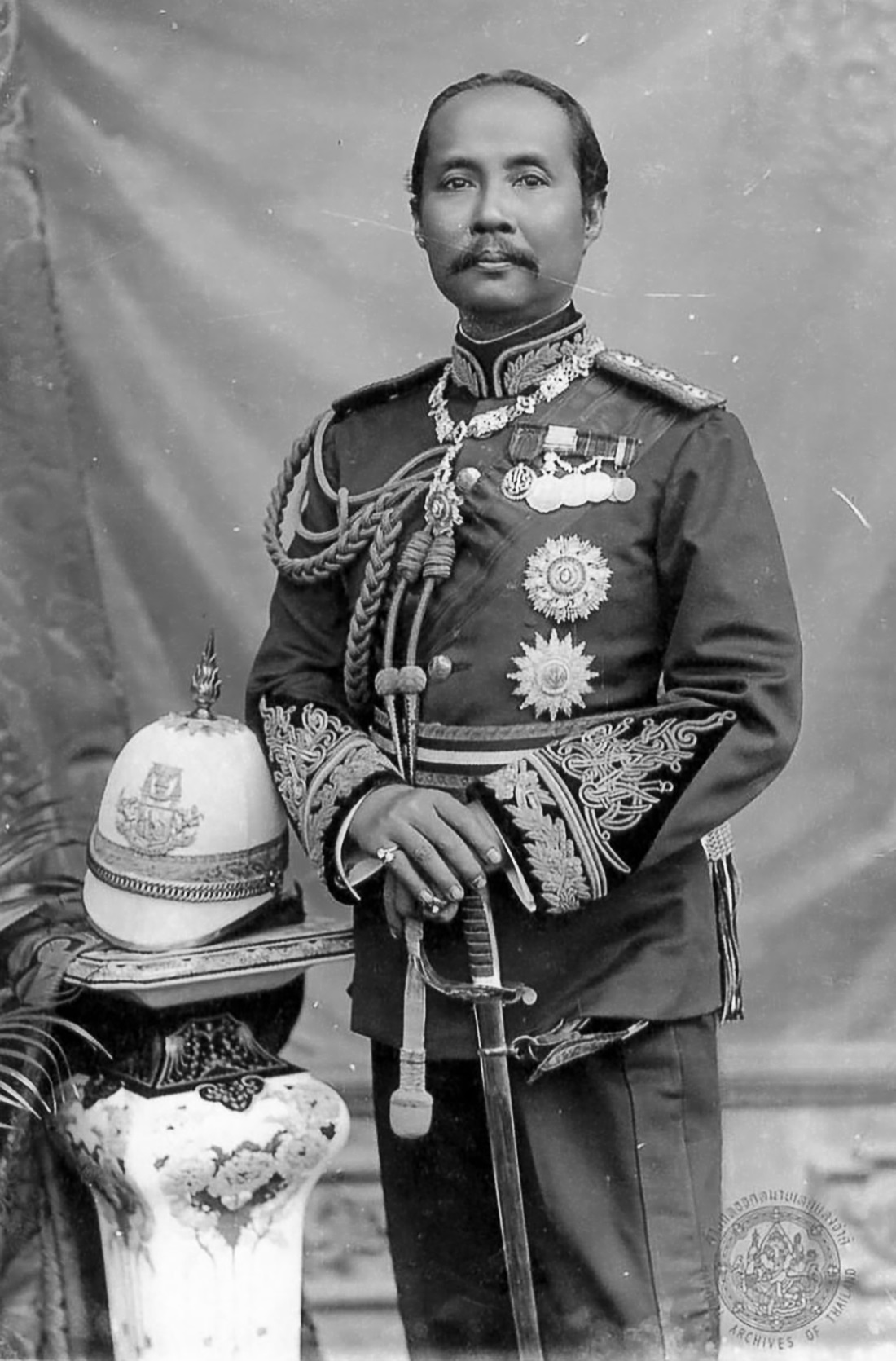
King Chulalongkorn

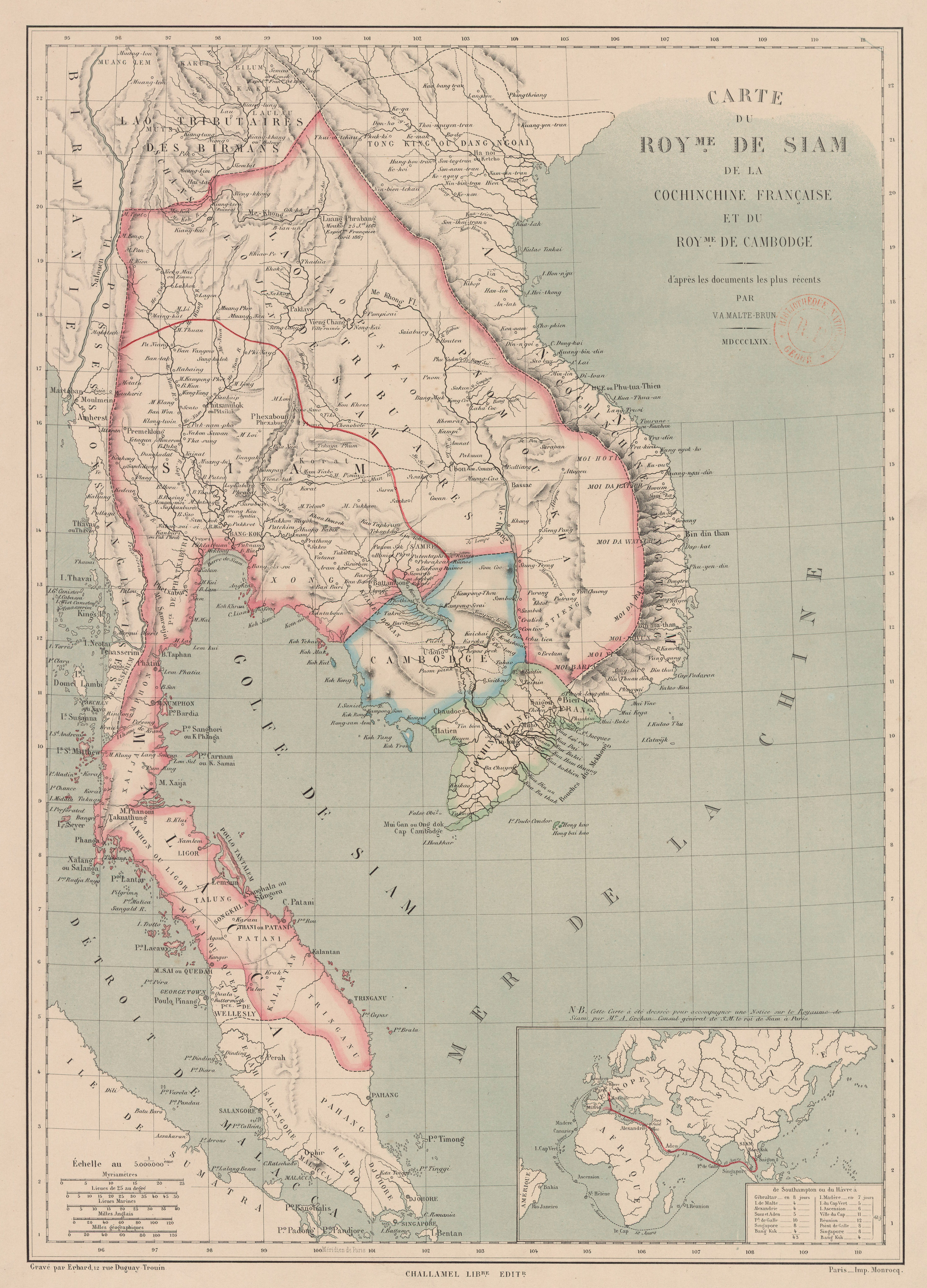
Map of the Kingdom of Siam with Tributary States, 1869

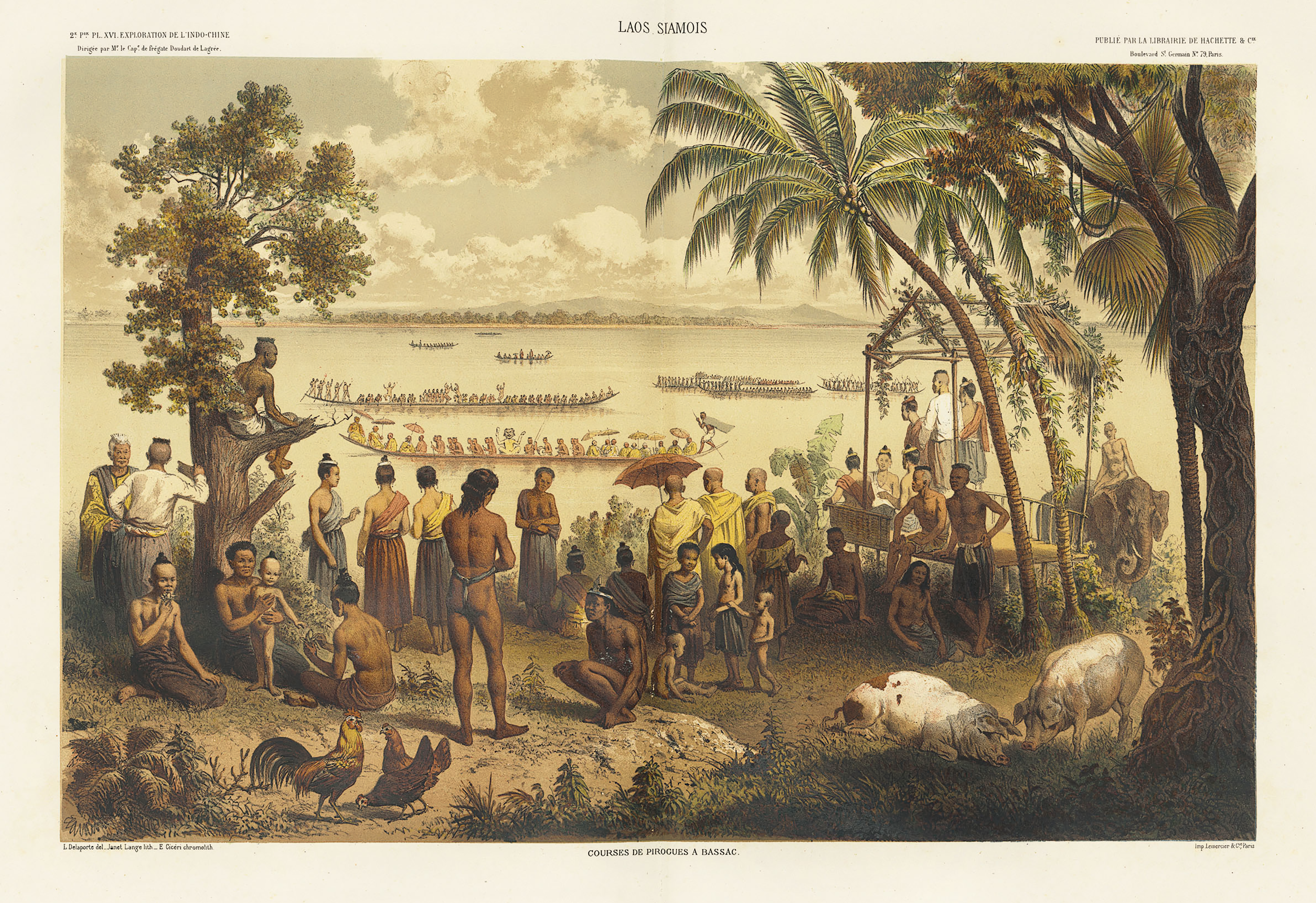
Siamese in Laos, canoe racing, 1866

When King Mongkut (Rama IV) ascended the Siamese throne, he was severely threatened by the neighbouring states. The colonial powers of Britain and France had already advanced into territories which originally belonged to the Siamese sphere of influence. Mongkut and his successor Chulalongkorn (Rama V) recognised this situation and tried to strengthen the defence forces of Siam by modernisation, to absorb Western scientific and technical achievements, thus avoiding colonisation.

The two monarchs, who ruled in this epoch, were the first with Western formation. King Mongkut had lived 26 years as a wandering monk and later as an abbot of Wat Bowonniwet Vihara. He was not only skilled in the traditional culture and Buddhist sciences of Siam, but he had also dealt extensively with modern western science, drawing on the knowledge of European missionaries and his correspondence with Western leaders and the Pope. He was the first Siamese monarch to speak English.

The colonial encroachment in the 1880s in Burma to the West by the British Empire and Indochina to the East by the French caused anxiety amongst the Siamese elites including the British-educated Prince Prisdang who put forward a proposal alongside eleven other senior dignitaries to King Chulalongkorn to strengthen Siamese institutions following the European model. Some of these reforms reflect need to keep up with European convention of liberal statecraft and justice to maintain legitimacy. Prisdang suggested that the following reforms should be carried out:

1. Change the absolute monarchy to a constitutional monarchy,
2. Establish a cabinet system or ministerial government,
3. Distribute power to the heads of departments,
4. Promulgate a law of royal succession,
5. Change the payment system for the bureaucracy from the commission system to a salary system,
6. Promote equality under the law,
7. Reform the legal system on the Western model,
8. Promote freedom of speech, and
9. Establish a merit system for the bureaucracy.

The majority of these reforms were implemented decades after Chulalongkorn's death.

As early as 1855, John Bowring, the British governor in Hong Kong, appeared on a warship at the mouth of the Chao Phraya River. Under the influence of Britain's achievements in neighbouring Burma, King Mongkut signed the so-called "Bowring Treaty", which abolished the royal foreign trade monopoly, abolished import duties, and granted Britain a most favourable clause. The Bowring Treaty meant the integration of Siam into the world economy, but at the same time, the royal house lost its most important sources of income. Similar treaties were concluded with all Western powers in the following years, such as in 1862 with Prussia and 1869 with Austria-Hungary. From the Prussian emissary Count Friedrich Albrecht zu Eulenburg comes a much-respected travel report about Siam. The survival diplomacy, which Siam had cultivated abroad for a long time, reached its climax in this epoch.

The integration into the global economy meant to Siam that it became a sales market for Western industrial goods and an investment for Western capital. The export of agricultural and mineral raw materials began, including the three products rice, pewter and teakwood, which were used to produce 90% of the export turnover. King Mongkut actively promoted the expansion of agricultural land by tax incentives, while the construction of traffic routes (canals, roads and later also railways) and the influx of Chinese immigrants allowed the agricultural development of new regions. Subsistence farming in the Lower Menam Valley developed into farmers actually earning money with their produce.

Mongkut's son, King Chulalongkorn (Rama V), ascended to the throne in 1868. He was the first Siamese king to have a full Western education, having been taught by a British governess, Anna Leonowens, whose place in Siamese history has been fictionalised as The King and I. At first Rama V's reign was dominated by the conservative regent, Somdet Chaophraya Sri Suriwongse, but when the king came of age in 1873 he soon took control. He created a Privy Council and a Council of State, a formal court system and budget office. He announced that slavery would be gradually abolished and debt-bondage restricted.

=== Western colonialism and cession of protectorates ===
Map showing territorial cession of Siamese protectorates in the late 19th and early 20th centuries. The result of the Franco-Siamese crisis was the cession of Laos (medium purple) to France in 1893.

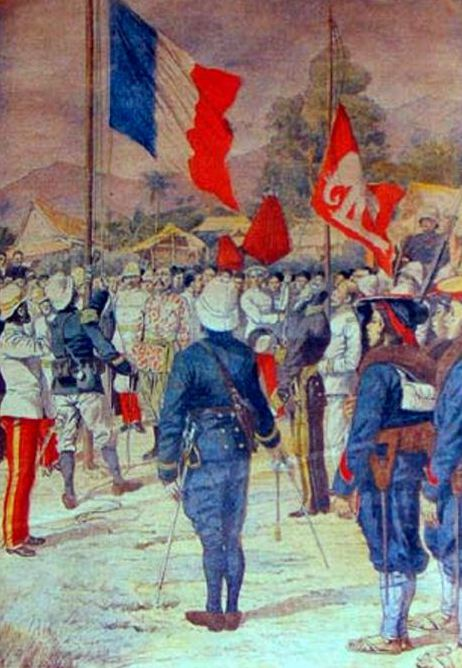
Occupation of Trat by French troops (1904).

Siam right before the cession of the Mekong territory in the RS112 incident.

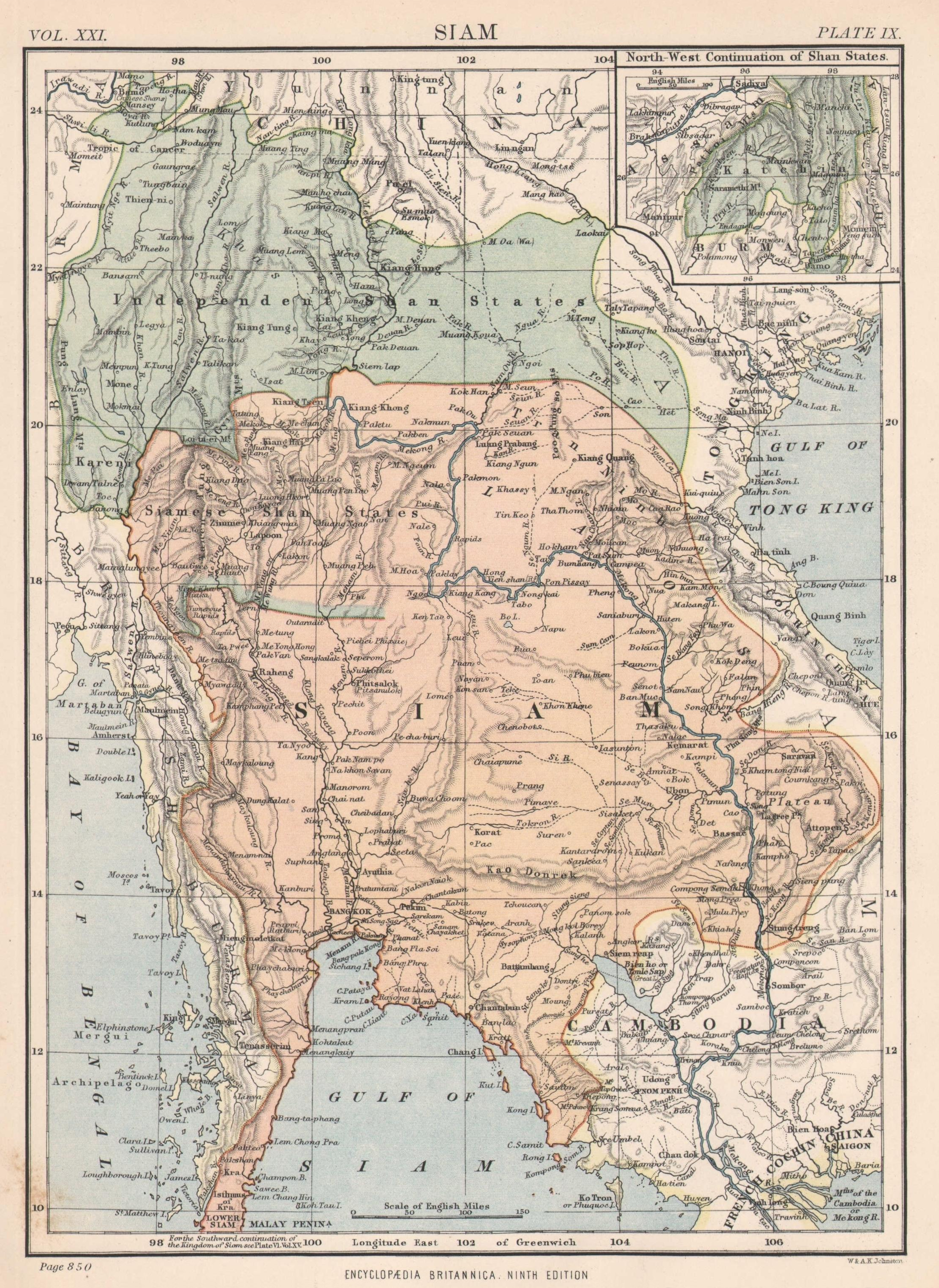
Kingdom of Siam and the Shan States in 1892 map by Britannica

Two kings, Mongkut and Chulalongkorn, witnessed the expansion of both France and Great Britain to increase their colonial territories in Southeast Asia and encircle Siam. From the west, the British conquered India, Burma and Malaya, and from the east, the French conquered South Vietnam, Vietnam and claimed to be "protecting" Cambodia, while Siam lost its extraterritorial rights in these areas to the new conquerors.

The construction of Kra Isthmus Canal, planned by a group of entrepreneurs led by the engineer Ferdinand de Lesseps, was not constructed after the British conquered Kongbaung-ruled Burma in the Third Anglo-Burmese War in 1885. A major event was the Paknam incident, when, on 13 July 1893, French cannon boats entered the Chao Phraya River toward Bangkok and were fired upon from a Siamese coastal fort, leading to the Franco-Siamese crisis. In the same year, Siam was compelled to conclude a treaty with France, in which the territory of Laos, located east of the Mekong, was annexed to French Indochina. The French forced Siam to refrain from any influence on its former vassal state. In 1887, the Indo-Chinese Union was founded. In 1896, British and French concluded a treaty which made a border between their colonies, with Siam defined as a buffer state.

After the French crisis of 1893, King Chulalongkorn realised the threat of the western colonial powers, and accelerated extensive reforms in the administration, military, economy and society of Siam, completing the development of the nation from a traditional feudalist structure based on personal domination and dependencies, whose peripheral areas were only indirectly bound to the central power (the King), to a centrally-governed national state with established borders and modern political institutions.

By 1892, The Kingdom of Siam controlled the Siamese Shan States, Laos, western Cambodia and Southern Thailand. Siam was bordered to the north by the Northern Shan States which included Kachin. On the western border was Burma. On the eastern border was Cambodia, French Cochinchina and Tonkin.

The Entente Cordiale of 8 April 1904 ended the rivalry between Great Britain and France over Siam. French and British zones of influence in Siam were outlined, with the eastern territories, adjacent to French Indochina, becoming a French zone, and the western, adjacent to Burmese Tenasserim, a British zone. The British recognised a French sphere of influence to the east of the River Menam's basin; in turn, the French recognised British influence over the territory to the west of the Menam basin. Both parties disclaimed any idea of annexing Siamese territory.

The Anglo-Siamese Treaty of 1909 defined the modern border between Siam and British Malaya. The treaty stated that Siam relinquished their claims over Kelantan, Terengganu, Kedah and Perlis to Great Britain, which were previously part of the semi-independent Malay sultanates of Pattani and Kedah. A series of treaties with France fixed the country's current eastern border with Laos and Cambodia.

In 1904, 1907 and 1909, there were new border corrections in favour of France and Great Britain. When King Chulalongkorn died in 1910, Siam had achieved the borders of today's Thailand. In 1910 he was peacefully succeeded by his son Vajiravudh, who reigned as Rama VI. He had been educated at Royal Military Academy Sandhurst and University of Oxford and was an anglicised Edwardian gentleman. Indeed, one of Siam's problems was the widening gap between the Westernised royal family and upper aristocracy and the rest of the country. It took another 20 years for Western education to extend to the rest of the bureaucracy and the army.

=== Nation formation under Vajiravudh and Prajadhipok (1910–1932) ===
Siam in 1900

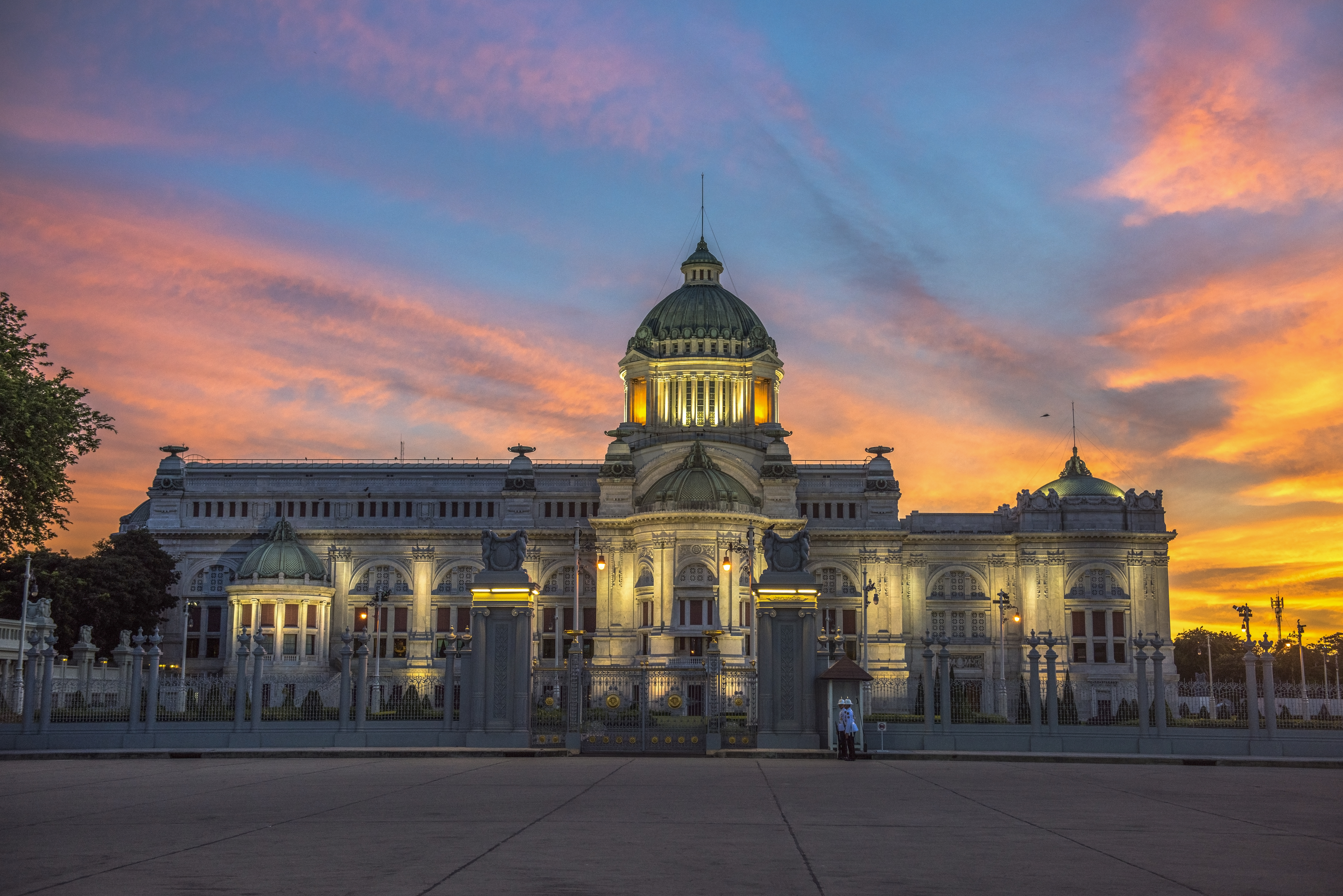
Ananta Samakhom Throne Hall, the royal reception hall built in European architectural style. Construction was started by Rama V, but was completed in 1915.

The successor of King Chulalongkorn was King Rama VI in October 1910, better known as Vajiravudh. He had studied law and history at the University of Oxford as the Siamese crown prince in Great Britain. After his ascension to the throne, he forgave important officials for his devoted friends, who were not part of the nobility, and even less qualified than their predecessors, an action which had hitherto been unprecedented in Siam. In his reign (1910–1925) many changes were made, which brought Siam closer to modern countries. For example, the Gregorian Calendar was introduced, all the citizens of his country had to accept Family names, women were encouraged to wear skirts and long hair fringements and a citizenship law, Principle of the "Ius sanguinis" was adopted. In 1917 the Chulalongkorn University was founded and school education was introduced for all 7 to 14-year-olds.

King Vajiravudh was a favour of literature, theatre, he translated many foreign literatures into Thai. He created the spiritual foundation for a kind of Thai nationalism, a phenomenon unknown in Siam. He was based on the unity of nation, Buddhism, and kingship, and demanded loyalty from his subjects to all these three institutions. King Vajiravudh also took refuge in an irrational and contradictory anti-Sinicism. As a result of the mass immigration, in contrast to previous immigration waves from China, women and entire families had also come into the country, which meant that the Chinese were less assimilated and retained their cultural independence. In an article published by King Vajiravudh under a pseudonym, he described the Chinese minority as Jews of the East.

King Vajiravudh also created some new social associations, for example, the Wild Tiger Corps (1911), a kind of Scout movement.

In 1912, a Palace revolt, plotted by young military officers, tried unsuccessfully to overthrow and replace the king. Their goals were to change the system of government, overthrowing the ancien régime and replacing it with a modern, Westernised constitutional system, and perhaps to replace Rama VI with a prince more sympathetic to their beliefs., but the king went against the conspirators, and sentenced many of them to long prison sentences. The members of the conspiracy consisted of military and the navy, the status of the monarchy, had become challenged.

=== World War I ===
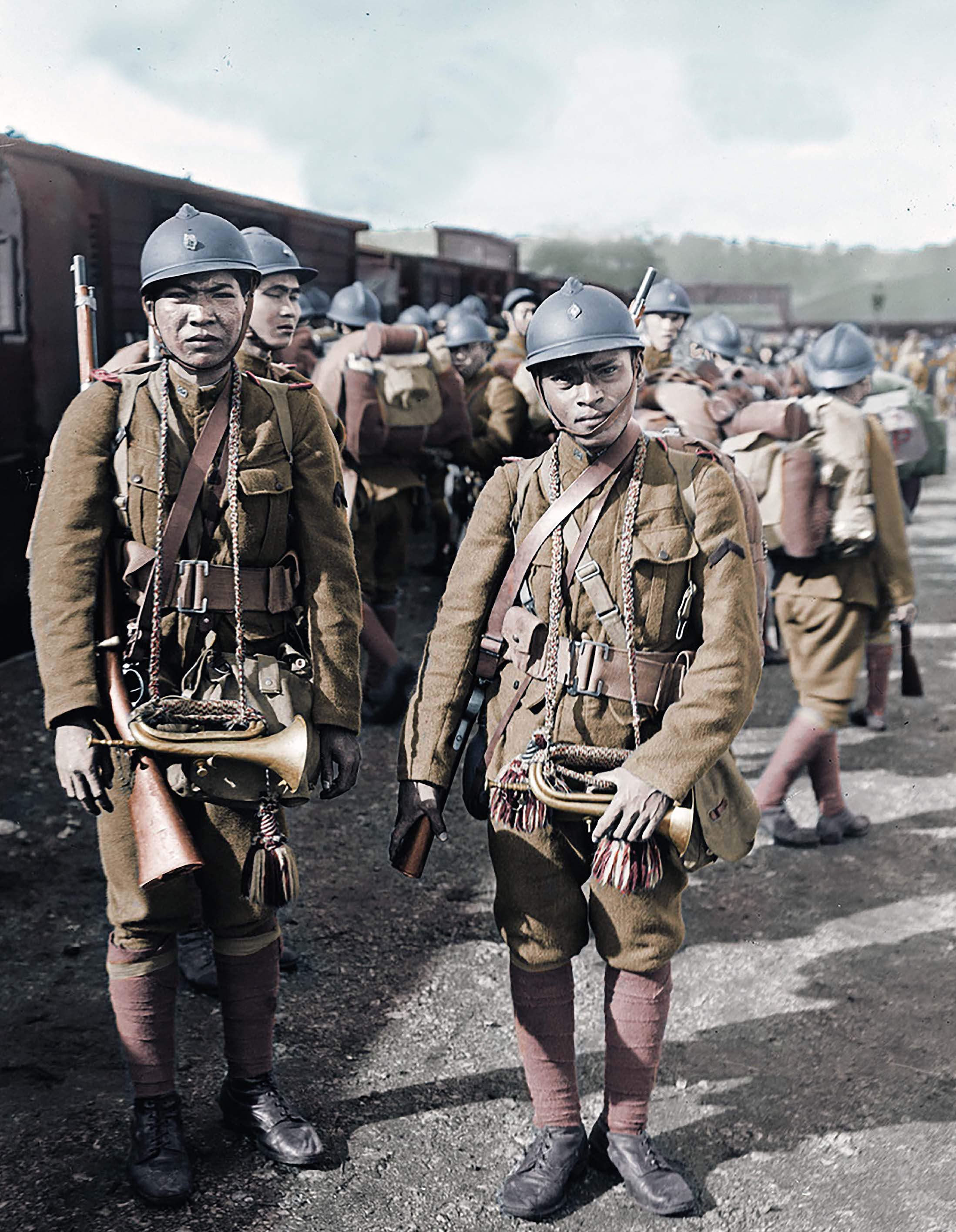
Siamese soldiers at a railway platform in France, 1918

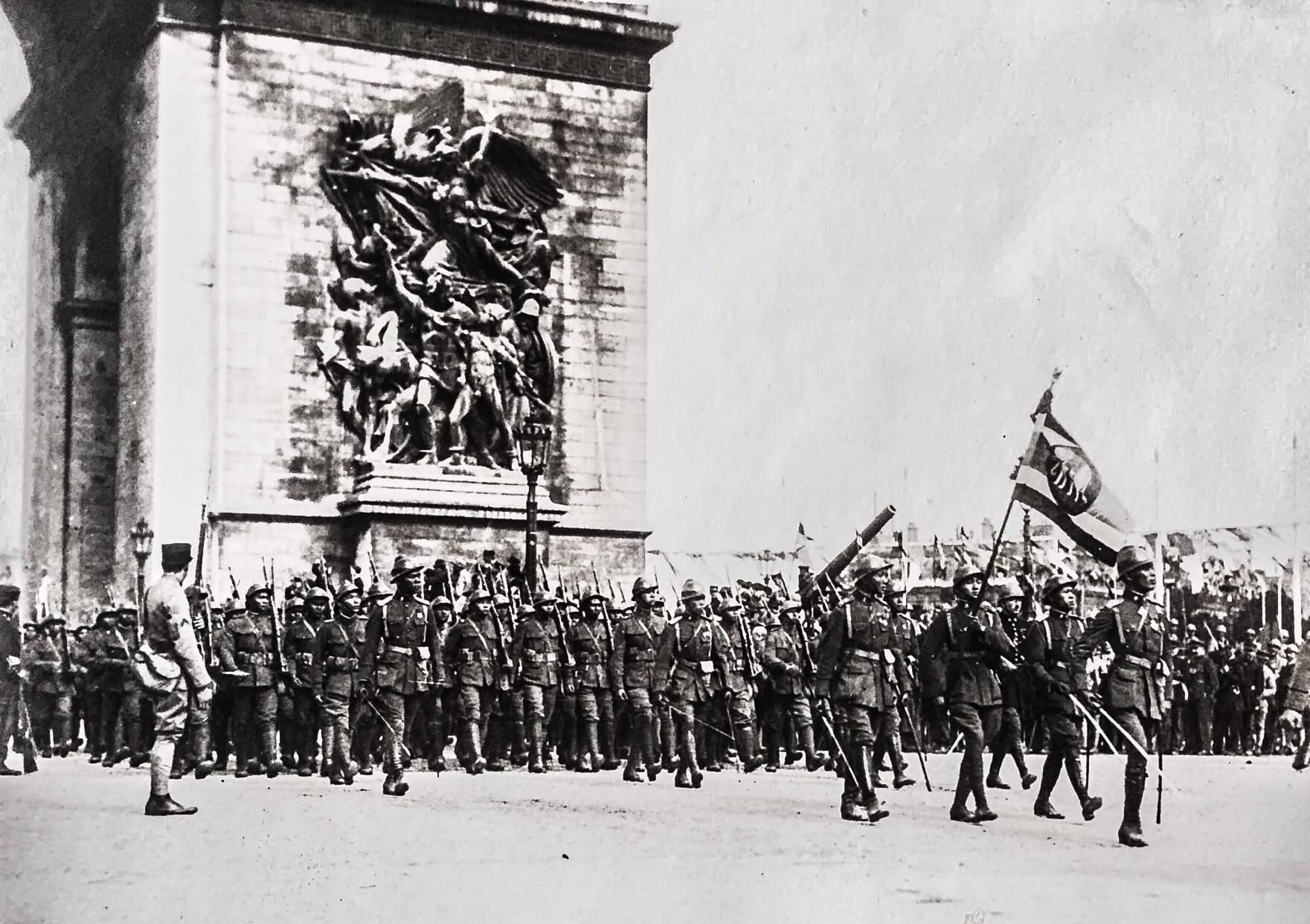
Troops of the Siamese Expeditionary Forces in Paris Victory Parade, 1919.

In 1917 Siam declared war on Germany and Austria-Hungary, mainly to gain favour with the British and the French. Siam's token participation in World War I secured it a seat at the Versailles Peace Conference, and Foreign Minister Devawongse used this opportunity to argue for the repeal of the 19th-century unequal treaties and the restoration of full Siamese sovereignty. The United States obliged in 1920, while France and Britain followed in 1925. This victory gained the king some popularity, but it was soon undercut by discontent over other issues, such as his extravagance, which became more noticeable when a sharp postwar recession hit Siam in 1919. There was also the fact that the king had no son. He obviously preferred the company of men to women (a matter which of itself did not much concern Siamese opinion, but which did undermine the stability of the monarchy due to the absence of heirs).

Thus when Rama VI died suddenly in 1925, aged only 44, the monarchy was already in a weakened state. He was succeeded by his younger brother Prajadhipok.

By 1925–1926, Siamese extraterritorial rights were restored a period of five years thereafter.

== Early years of constitutional monarchy (1932–1945) ==
=== Revolution and difficult compromise ===
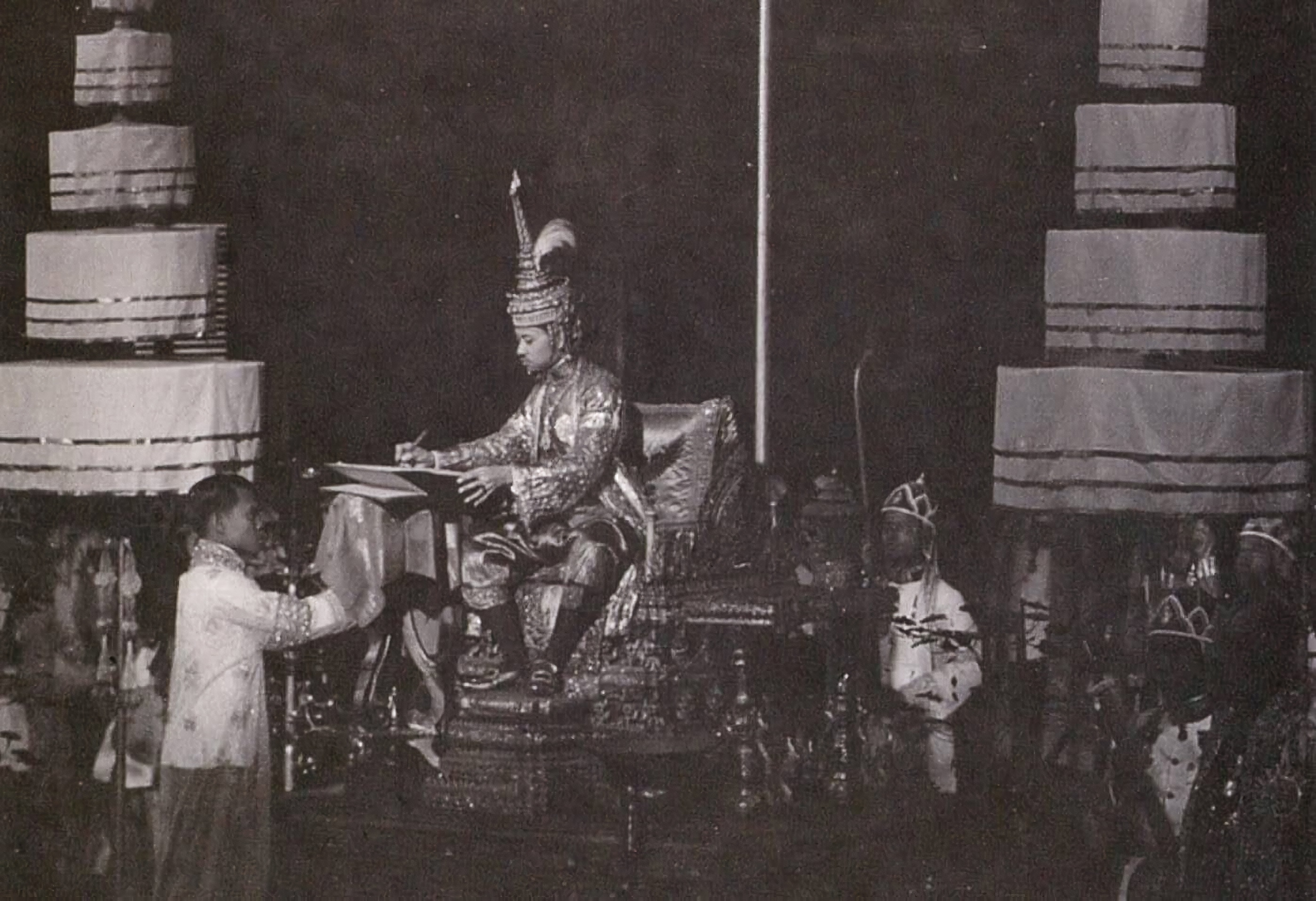
King Prajadhipok signing the Permanent Constitution of Siam on 10 December 1932

A small circle from the rising bourgeoisie of former students (all of whom had completed their studies in Europe – mostly Paris), supported by some military men, seized power from the absolute monarchy on 24 June 1932 in an almost nonviolent revolution. This was also called the "Siamese Revolution". The group, which called themselves Khana Ratsadon or sponsors, gathered officers, intellectuals and bureaucrats, who represented the idea of the refusal of the absolute monarchy.

The Khana Ratsadon installed a constitutional monarchy with Prajadhipok as king at the top – a corresponding constitution was proclaimed on 10 December of the year. On the same day, the experienced and rather conservative lawyer Phraya Manopakorn Nititada, was appointed as first Siamese Prime Minister. By selecting a non-party head of government, the Khana Ratsadon wanted to avoid the suspicion that the coup had only been carried out in order to come to power itself. However, the overthrow of the monarchy did not lead to free elections, and political unions were forbidden. Bureaucracy and the military shared the power in the National Assembly. The constitution was annexed to the monarchist ideology ("nation, religion, king") as a fourth pillar.

In the following period it became clear how heterogeneous the group of Khana Ratsadon was, and it fell into several rival wings, especially those of the high officers, the younger officers and the civilians. From the liberal and civilian wing, Pridi Phanomyong sought a profound transformation of the country's social and economic system. To this end, he presented an economic plan in January 1933, which became known as a "Yellow Cover Dossier" (Thai: สมุดปกเหลือง). Among other things, he proposed the nationalisation of farmland, industrialization through public companies, universal healthcare and pension insurance. The King, the rather conservative Prime Minister Phraya Manopakorn, and the high-ranking officers in the Khana Ratsadon around Phraya Songsuradet and even Pridi's friend and co-worker Prayun Phamonmontri, opposed the plan.

Fearing that Pridi's liberal wing, who had the majority in the National Assembly, would decide to take action, Phraya Manopakorn dissolved the parliament in April, imposed an emergency, and rescinded the constitution, which had not yet been a year old. He imposed a law against Communist activities, which was directed not so much against the almost insignificant Communist Party of Thailand, but rather against the alleged Communist projects of Pridi. However, the younger officers of the Khana Ratsadon resisted and countered the actions of Phraya Manopakorn in another coup d'état only one year later, in June 1933, resulting in the appointment of Phraya Phahon as Siam's second prime minister.

=== Khana Ratsadon's rise ===
After the fall of Phraya Manopakorn, Phraya Phahon became the new Prime Minister. Pridi Phanomyong was expelled from the charge of communism, but his economic plan was largely ignored. Only a few of his ideas, such as the expansion of primary schools and industrialisation with state enterprises, were gradually implemented. In 1933, Pridis founded the Thammasat University in Bangkok, which with its liberal self-image has remained a symbol of freedom and democracy. At the same time, the nationalist group led by Phibunsongkhram strengthened in the People's Party, oriented to the totalitarian ideas of Italy, Germany, Japan, but also the "young Turks" (Kemal Atatürk).

The many unsettled constitutional roles of the crown and the dissatisfaction with Khana Ratsadon, especially Pridi's post in the new government, culminated in October 1933 in a reactionary Boworadet Rebellion staged by royalist factions. The royalists were led by Prince Boworadet, Prajadhipok's minister of defence. His forces who mobilised from provincial garrisons captured the Don Muang Aerodrome and led Siam into small-scale civil War. After heavy fighting in the outskirts of Bangkok, the royalists were finally defeated and Prince Boworadet left for exile in French Indochina.

After the Boworadet rebellion and some other disagreements with Khana Khana Ratsadon thereafter, King Prajadhipok abdicated the throne and exiled himself. He was replaced as king by his nine-year-old nephew Prince Ananda Mahidol (King Rama VIII), who at that time was attending school in Lausanne, Switzerland. Plaek Phibunsongkhram's popularity increased from his role in leading anti-rebellion forces.

During this time, Pridi played an important role in modernising Thai public administration: completed Thai legal codes, created the local government system.

=== Dictatorship of Phibunsongkhram ===
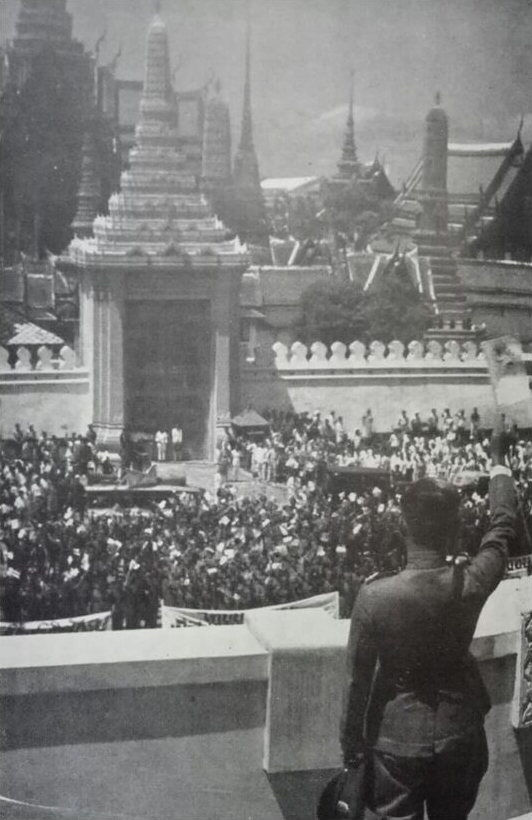
Phibun welcomes students of Chulalongkorn University, at Bangkok's Grand Palace – 8 October 1940.

When Phibulsonggram succeeded Phraya Phahon as Prime Minister in September 1938, the military and civilian wings of Khana Ratsadon diverged even further, and military domination became more overt. Phibunsongkhram began moving the government towards militarism, and totalitarianism, as well as building a personality cult around himself.

The defeat of France in the Battle of France was the catalyst for the Thai leadership to begin an attack on French Indochina. This began with smaller conflicts in 1940 and resulted in the Franco-Thai War in 1941. It suffered a heavy defeat in the sea battle of Ko Chang, but it dominated on land and in the air. The Empire of Japan, already the dominant power in the Southeast Asian region, took over the role of mediator. The negotiations ended the conflict with Thai territorial gains in the French colonies of Laos and Cambodia.

By 1942, he had issued a series of cultural decrees ("ratthaniyom") or Thai cultural mandates, which reflected the desire for social modernisation, but also an authoritarian and exaggerated nationalist spirit. During this period, the ultranationalist movements backed by his government and aligned with his ideology, including Khana Lueat Thai, also began emerging. First, in 1939, he changed the country's name of Siam to Thailand (Prathet Thai) (Thai: ประเทศไทย). This is based on the idea of a "Thai race", a Pan-Thai nationalism whose program is the integration of the Shan, the Lao and other Tai peoples, such as those in Vietnam, Burma and South China, into a "Great Kingdom of Thailand" (Thai: มหาอาณาจักรไทย). Other decrees urged the citizens to embrace Western-style modernisation.

=== World War II ===
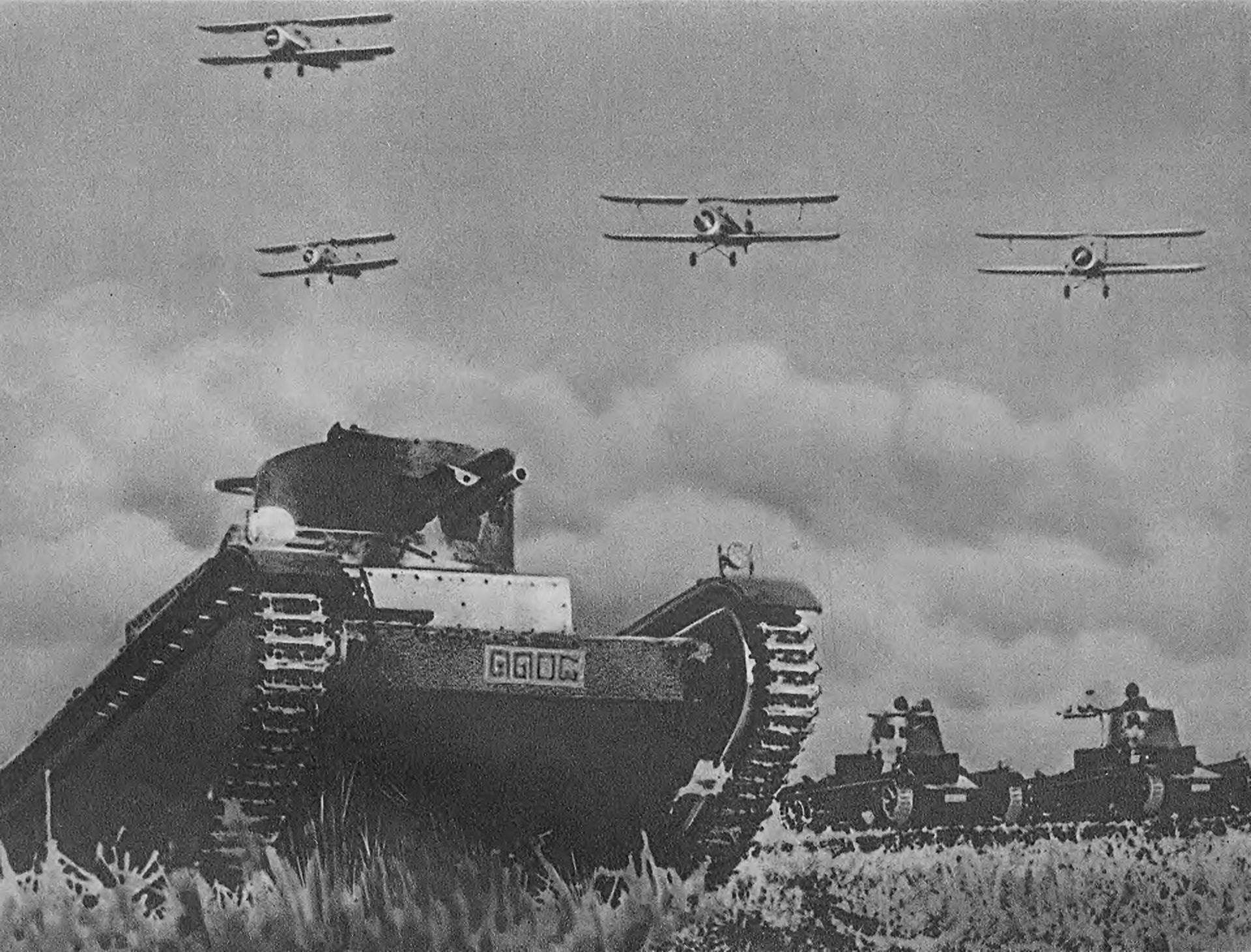
Siamese Vought V-93S Corsair and Vickers 6-ton tanks c1935

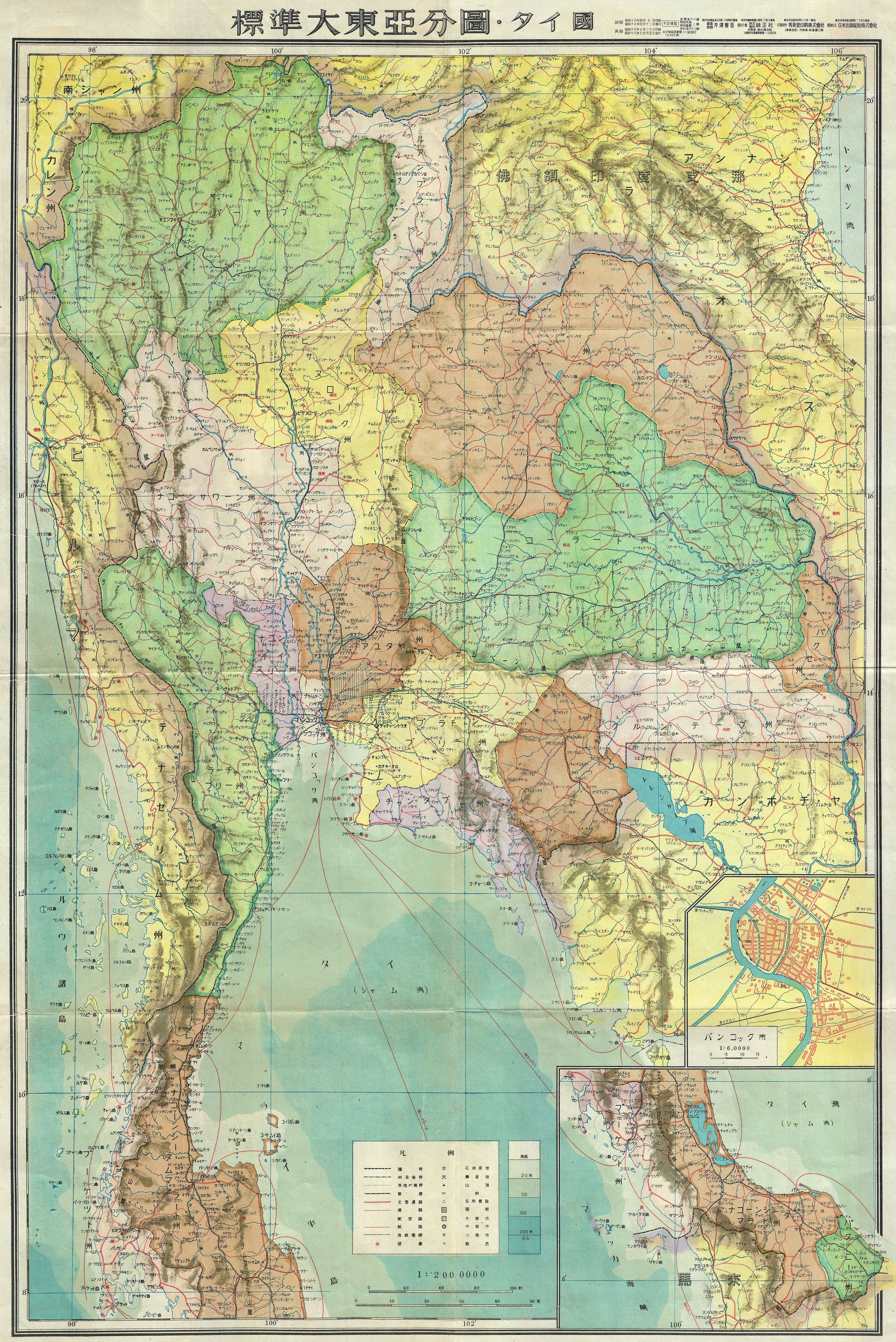
Japanese map of Thailand in 1943

After the Franco-Thai war ended, the Thai government declared neutrality. When the Japanese invaded Thailand on 8 December 1941, a few hours after the attack on Pearl Harbor, Japan demanded the right to move troops across Thailand to the Malayan frontier. Phibun accepted Japanese demands after a brief resistance. The government improved relations with Japan by signing a military alliance in December 1941. Japanese armies used the country as a base for their invasions of Burma and Malaya. Hesitancy, however, gave way to enthusiasm after the Japanese rolled their way through Malaya in a "Bicycle Blitzkrieg" with surprisingly little resistance. The following month, Phibun declared war on Britain and the United States. South Africa and New Zealand declared war on Thailand on the same day. Australia followed soon after. All who opposed the Japanese alliance were sacked from his government. Pridi Phanomyong was appointed acting regent for the absent King Ananda Mahidol, while Direk Jayanama, the prominent foreign minister who had advocated continued resistance against the Japanese, was later sent to Tokyo as an ambassador. The United States considered Thailand to be a puppet of Japan and refused to declare war. When the allies were victorious, the United States blocked British efforts to impose a punitive peace.

The Thais and Japanese agreed that Shan State and Kayah State were to be under Thai control. On 10 May 1942, the Thai Phayap Army entered Burma's eastern Shan State, the Thai Burma Area Army entered Kayah State and some parts of central Burma. Three Thai infantry and one cavalry division, spearheaded by armoured reconnaissance groups and supported by the air force, engaged the retreating Chinese 93rd Division. Kengtung, the main objective, was captured on 27 May. Renewed offensives in June and November saw the Chinese retreat into Yunnan. The area containing the Shan States and Kayah State was annexed by Thailand in 1942. They would be ceded back to Burma in 1945.

The Seri Thai (Free Thai Movement) was an underground resistance movement against Japan founded by Seni Pramoj, the Thai ambassador in Washington. Led from within Thailand from the office of the regent Pridi, it operated freely, often with support from members of the royal family such as Prince Chula Chakrabongse, and members of the government. As Japan neared defeat and the underground anti-Japanese resistance Seri Thai steadily grew in strength, the National Assembly forced out Phibun. His six-year reign as the military commander-in-chief was at an end. His resignation was partly forced by his two grandiose plans gone awry. One was to relocate the capital from Bangkok to a remote site in the jungle near Phetchabun in north-central Thailand. The other was to build a "Buddhist city" near Saraburi. Announced at a time of severe economic difficulty, these ideas turned many government officers against him.

At war's end, Phibun was put on trial at Allied insistence on charges of having committed war crimes, mainly that of collaborating with the Axis powers. However, he was acquitted amid intense public pressure. Public opinion was still favourable to Phibun, as he was thought to have done his best to protect Thai interests, specifically using the alliance with Japan to support the expansion of Thai territory in Malaya and Burma.

=== Allied occupation of Thailand ===
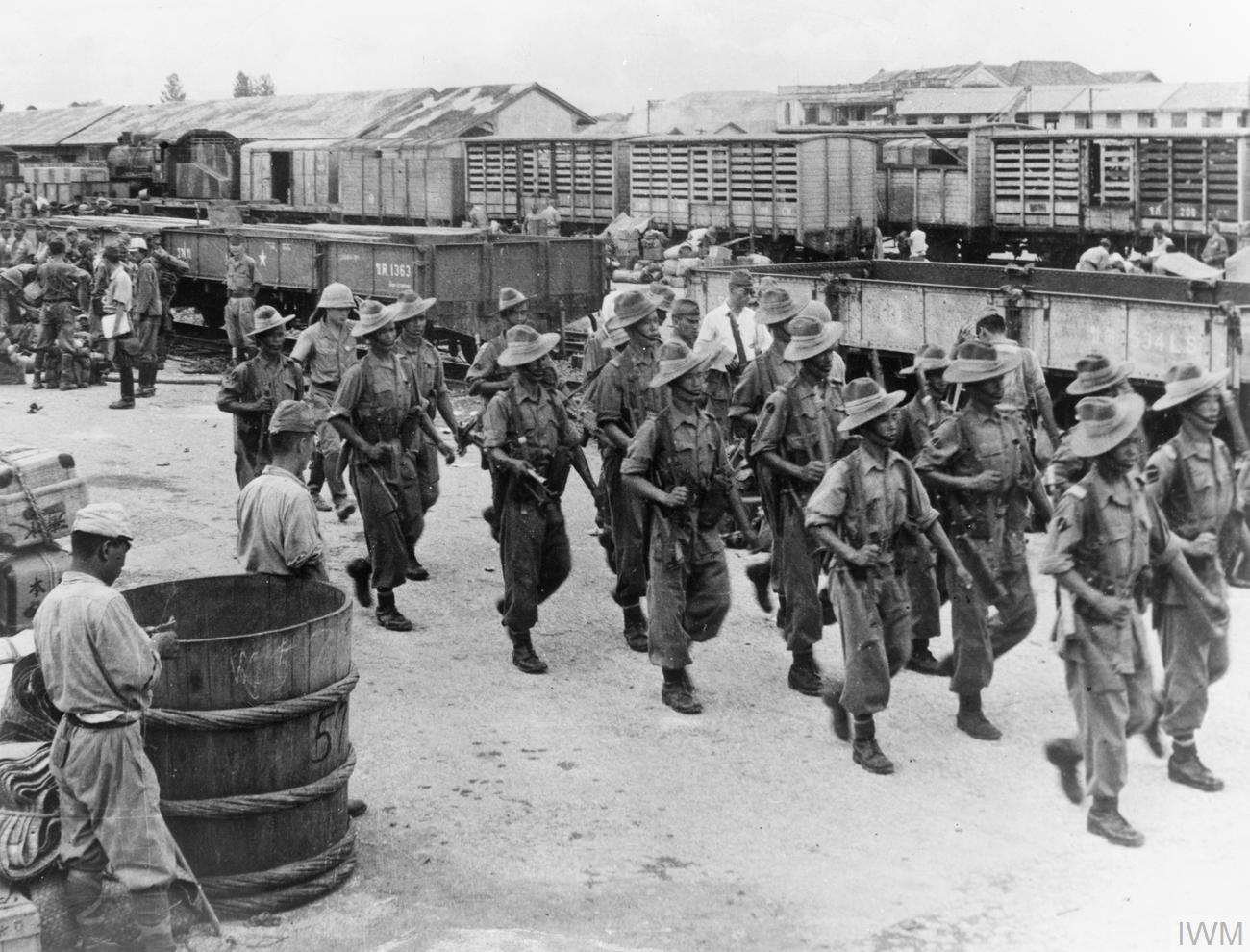
Gurkhas guide disarmed Japanese soldiers from Bangkok to prisoner of war camps outside the city, September 1945

After Japan's defeat in 1945, British, Indian troops, and US observers landed in September, and during their brief occupation of parts of the country disarmed the Japanese troops. After repatriating them, the British left in March 1946.

In early September the leading elements of Major General Geoffrey Charles Evans's 7th Indian Infantry Division landed, accompanied by Edwina Mountbatten. Later that month Seni Pramoj returned from Washington to succeed Tawee as prime minister. It was the first time in over a decade that the government had been controlled by civilians. But the ensuing factional scramble for power in late 1945 created political divisions in the ranks of the civilian leaders that destroyed their potential for making a common stand against the resurgent political force of the military in the post-war years.

Following the signature by Thailand of the Washington Accord of 1946, the territories that had been annexed after the Franco-Thai War, which included Phibunsongkhram Province, Nakhon Champassak Province, Phra Tabong Province, Koh Kong Province and Lan Chang Province, were returned to Cambodia and Laos.

Moreover, the post-war accommodations with the Allies weakened the civilian government. As a result of the contributions made to the Allied war effort by the Free Thai Movement, the United States, which unlike the other Allies had never officially been at war with Thailand, refrained from dealing with Thailand as an enemy country in post-war peace negotiations. Before signing a peace treaty, however, Britain demanded war reparations in the form of rice shipments to Malaya. An Anglo-Thai Peace Treaty was signed on 1 January 1946, and an Australian–Thai Peace Treaty on 3 April. France refused to permit admission of Thailand to the United Nations until Indochinese territories annexed during the war were returned. The Soviet Union insisted on the repeal of anti-communist legislation.

== Bhumibol period (1946–2016) ==
=== Democratic elections and the military returns ===
Elections were held in January 1946. These were the first elections in which political parties were legal, and Pridi's People's Party and its allies won a majority. In March 1946 Pridi became Siam's first democratically elected prime minister. In 1946, after he agreed to hand back the Indochinese territories occupied in 1941 as the price for admission to the United Nations, all wartime claims against Siam were dropped and substantial US aid was received.

Thai Triumvirate, 1947–1957

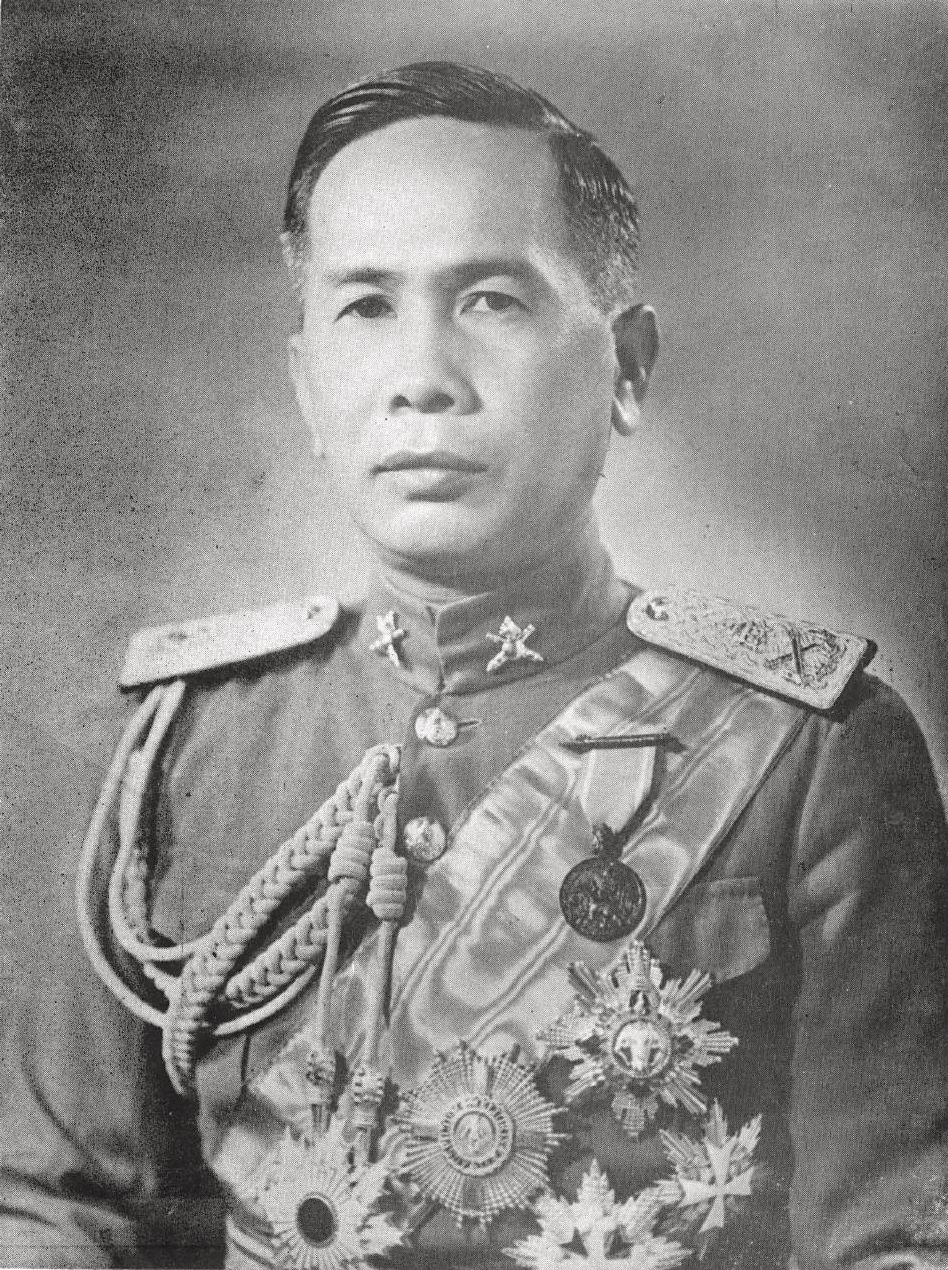
Field Marshal
Plaek Phibunsongkhram

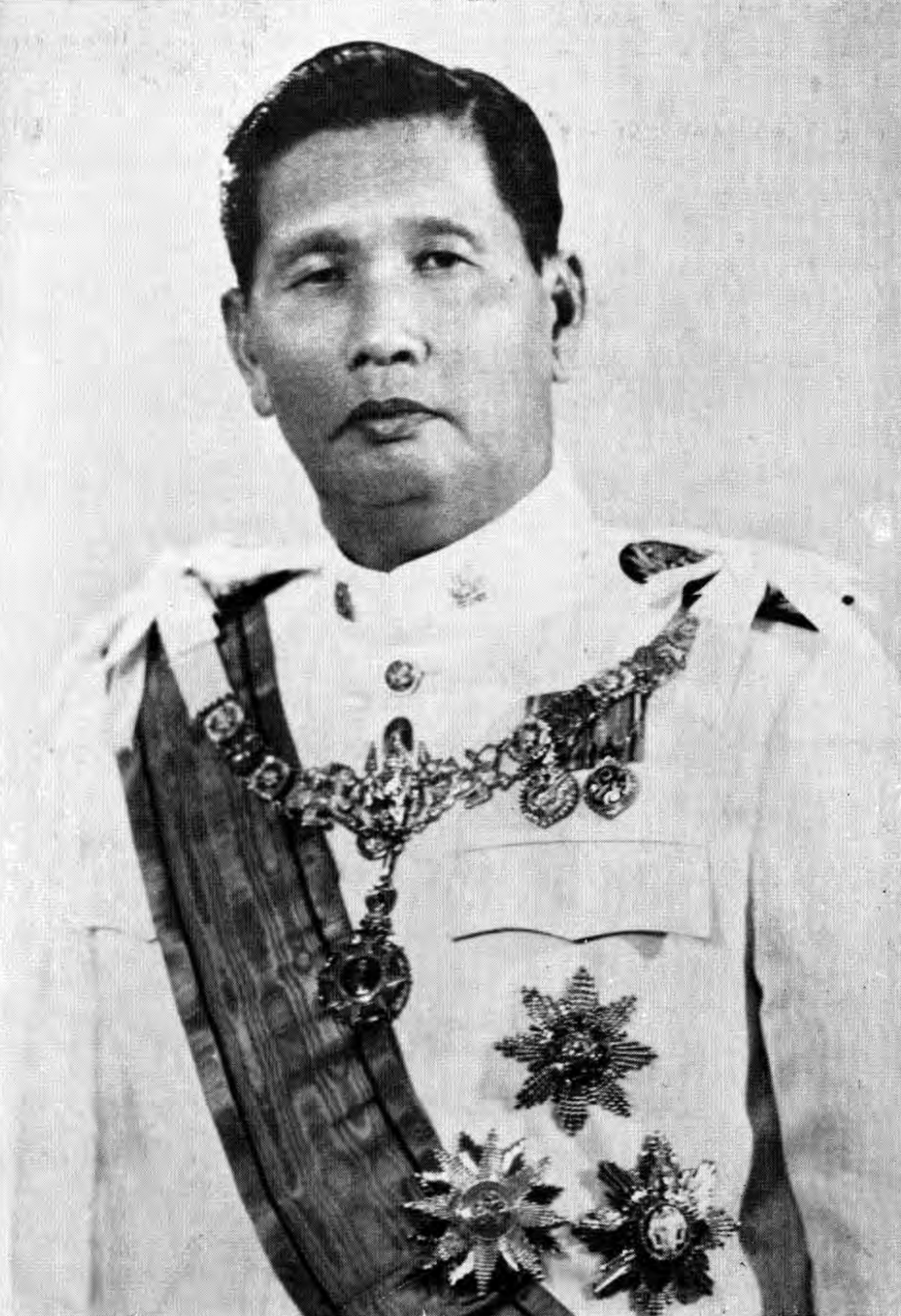
Field Marshal
Sarit Thanarat

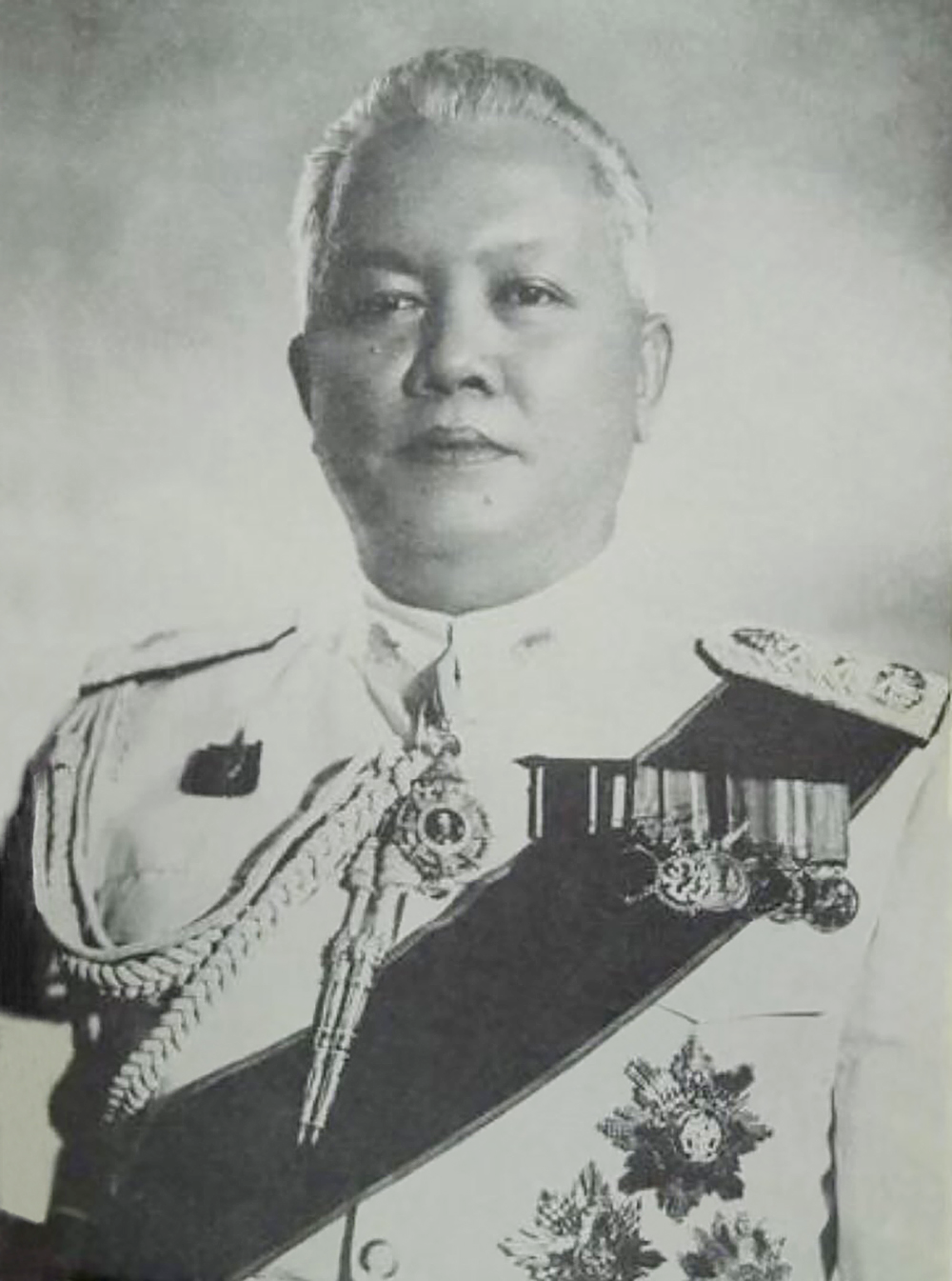
Police Gen.
Phao Siyanon

In December 1945, the young king Ananda Mahidol had returned to Siam from Europe, but in June 1946 he was found shot dead in his bed, under mysterious circumstances. Three palace servants were tried and executed for his murder, although there are significant doubts as to their guilt and the case remains both murky and a highly sensitive topic in Thailand today. The king was succeeded by his younger brother, Bhumibol Adulyadej. In August Pridi was forced to resign amid suspicion that he had been involved in the regicide. Without his leadership, the civilian government foundered, and in November 1947 the army, its confidence restored after the debacle of 1945, seized power. After an interim Khuang-headed government, in April 1948 the army brought Phibun back from exile and made him prime minister. Pridi, in turn, was driven into exile, eventually settling in Beijing as a guest of the PRC.

=== Cold War (1947–1989) ===
Phibun's return to power coincided with the onset of the Cold War and the establishment of a communist regime in North Vietnam. He soon won the support of the United Nations. Once again political opponents were arrested and tried, and some were executed. During this time, several of the key figures in the wartime Free Thai underground, including Thawin Udom, Thawi Thawethikul, Chan Bunnak, and Tiang Sirikhanth, were eliminated in extra-legal fashion by the Thai police, run by Phibun's ruthless associate Phao Sriyanond. There were attempted counter-coups by Pridi supporters in 1948, 1949, and 1951, the second leading to heavy fighting between the army and navy before Phibun emerged victorious. In the navy's 1951 attempt, popularly known as the Manhattan Coup, Phibun was nearly killed when the ship where he was held hostage was bombed by the pro-government air force.

Although nominally a constitutional monarchy, Thailand was ruled by a series of military governments, most prominently led by Phibun, interspersed with brief periods of democracy. Thailand took part in the Korean War. Communist Party of Thailand guerrilla forces operated inside the country from the early-1960s to 1987. They included 12,000 full-time fighters at the peak of movement, but never posed a serious threat to the state.

By 1955 Phibun was losing his leading position in the army to younger rivals led by Field Marshal Sarit Thanarat and General Thanom Kittikachorn, the Sarit's army staged a bloodless coup on 17 September 1957, ending Phibun's career for good. The coup beginning a long tradition of US-backed military regimes in Thailand. Thanom became prime minister until 1958, then yielded his place to Sarit, the real head of the regime. Sarit held power until his death in 1963, when Thanom again took the lead.

=== The rise of American influence ===
In 1948 the government of Phibun Songkhram declared that Thailand would adopt an anti-communist stance in the emerging Cold War. Around the same time the United States began to see Thailand as an important bastion against communism in Asia and sought ways to support the government. A State Department policy statement in 1950 noted that 'effective resistance to Communism must be based on widespread public support within the country' and set out that Thailand would receive a payment of $10,000,000 in aid. In 1950 Thailand sent troops to the Korean War and in 1954 Thailand joined the South East Asia Treaty Organization (SEATO). US financial and technical support greatly benefited the armed forces.

During the First Indochina War, the United States increasingly focused on securing Thailand's long term status as an anti-communist state through psychological programs. In September 1953, a key architect of the CIA, William Donovan was sent to Thailand to win the support of Thailand's nationalist elite. This involved a large indoctrination campaign aimed at convincing Thailand's bureaucracy that their country's interests aligned with those of the US. Through the 1950s American influence in Thailand through the decade as its status as a bastion against Communism was entrenched. Some of the most prominent early visitors were academics from the expanding area studies campuses in the United States. Most notable was Cornell University which established the Bang Chan project in a rural area north of Bangkok. For decades, the site was a key site for visiting American scholars who came to conduct ethnographic studies of the Thai people.

=== Indochina wars and communist insurgency ===
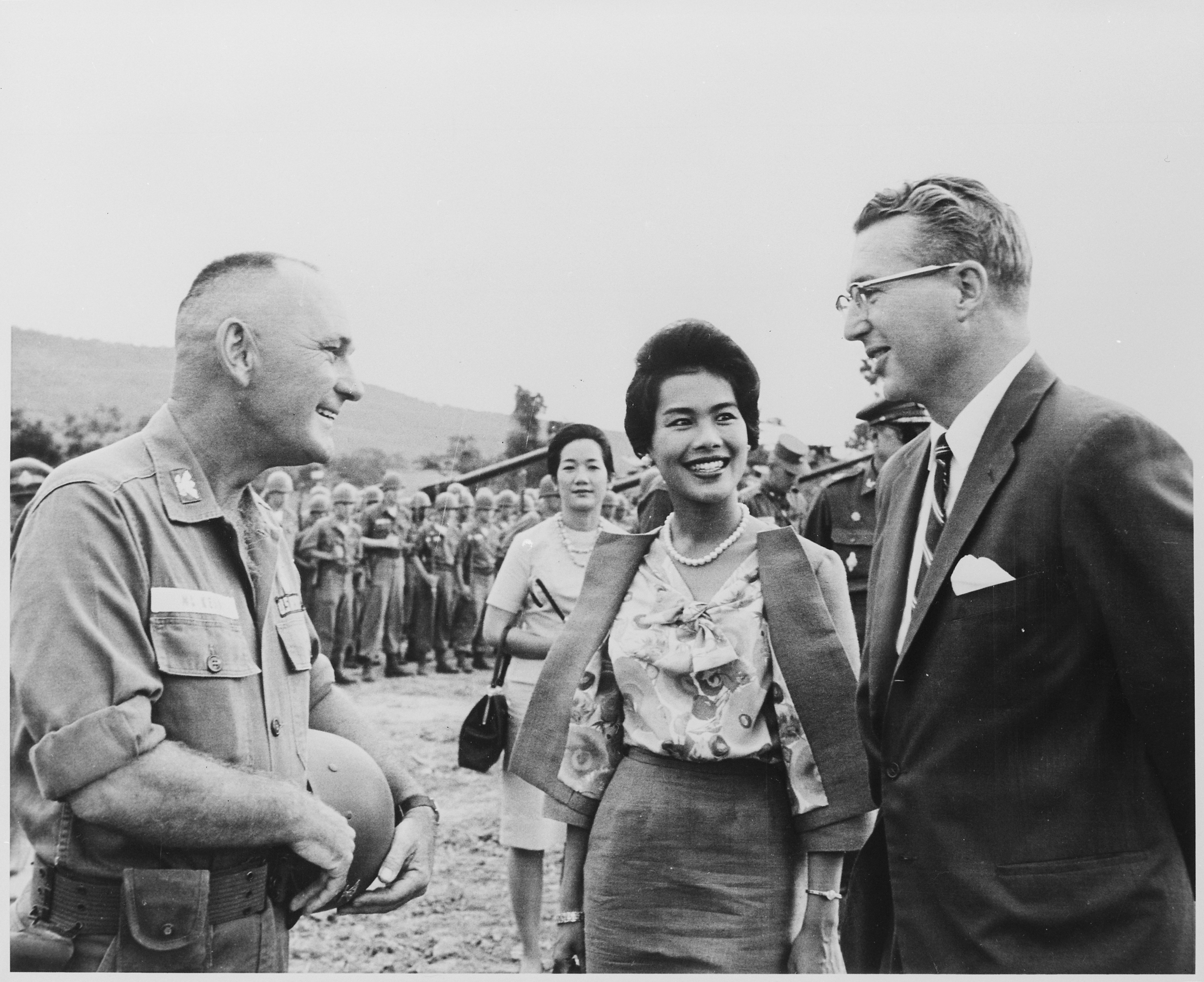
King Bhumibol and Queen Sirikit of Thailand visited the U.S. Army's 27th Infantry "Wolfhounds" near Korat, Thailand in 1962. Here, Queen Sirikit visited with Colonel William A. Mckean, Commander of the 27th, and U.S. Ambassador to Thailand, Kenneth T. Young Jr. The U.S. forces in Thailand are used to assist as instructors and advisors.

The regimes of Sarit and Thanom were strongly supported by the US. Thailand had formally become a US ally in 1954 with the formation of the SEATO. While the war in Indochina was being fought between the Vietnamese and the French, Thailand (disliking both equally) stayed aloof, but once it became a war between the US and the Vietnamese communists, Thailand committed itself strongly to the US side, concluding a secret agreement with the US in 1961, sending troops to Vietnam and Laos, and allowing the US to use airbases in the east of the country to conduct its bombing war against North Vietnam. The Vietnamese retaliated by supporting the Communist Party of Thailand's insurgency in the north, northeast, and sometimes in the south, where guerrillas co-operated with local discontented Muslims. In the postwar period, Thailand had close relations with the US, which it saw as a protector from communist revolutions in neighbouring countries. The Seventh and Thirteenth US Air Forces were headquartered at Udon Royal Thai Air Force Base.

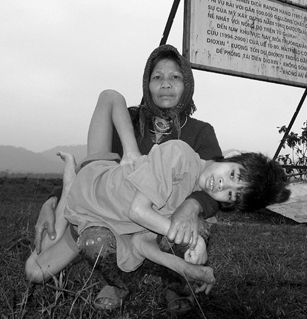
A 14-year-old Vietnamese contaminated with Agent Orange.

Agent Orange, a herbicide and defoliant chemical used by the U.S. military as part of its herbicidal warfare program, Operation Ranch Hand, was tested by the United States in Thailand during the war in Southeast Asia. Buried drums were uncovered and confirmed to be Agent Orange in 1999. Workers who uncovered the drums fell ill while upgrading the airport near Hua Hin District, 100 km south of Bangkok.

US Vietnam-era veterans whose service involved duty on or near the perimeters of military bases in Thailand anytime between 28 February 1961, and 7 May 1975, may have been exposed to herbicides and may qualify for VA benefits.

A declassified US Department of Defense report written in 1973 suggests that there was a significant use of herbicides on the fenced-in perimeters of military bases in Thailand to remove foliage that provided cover for enemy forces.

Between 1962 and 1965, 350 Thai nationals underwent an eight-month training course in North Vietnam. In the first half of 1965, the rebels smuggled approximately 3,000 US-made weapons and 90,000 rounds of ammunition from Laos.

Between 1961 and 1965, insurgents carried out 17 political assassinations. They avoided full scale guerrilla warfare until the summer of 1965, when militants began engaging Thai security forces. A total of 13 clashes were recorded during that period. The second half of 1965 was marked by a further 25 violent incidents, and starting in November 1965, Communist Party of Thailand (CPT) insurgents began undertaking more elaborate operations. Often the source of border problems was ordinary criminals or local merchants involved in illegal mining, logging, smuggling, and narcotics production and trade.

The insurgency spread to other parts of Thailand in 1966, although 90 percent of insurgency-related incidents occurred in the northeast of the country. On 14 January 1966, a spokesman representing the Thai Patriotic Front called for the start of a "people's war" in Thailand. The statement marked an escalation of violence in the conflict. The communist-led insurgents were of paramount concern to the Thai security forces for several decades. The Thai government declared amnesty on 23 April 1980. By 1983 the CPT entirely abandoned the insurgency.

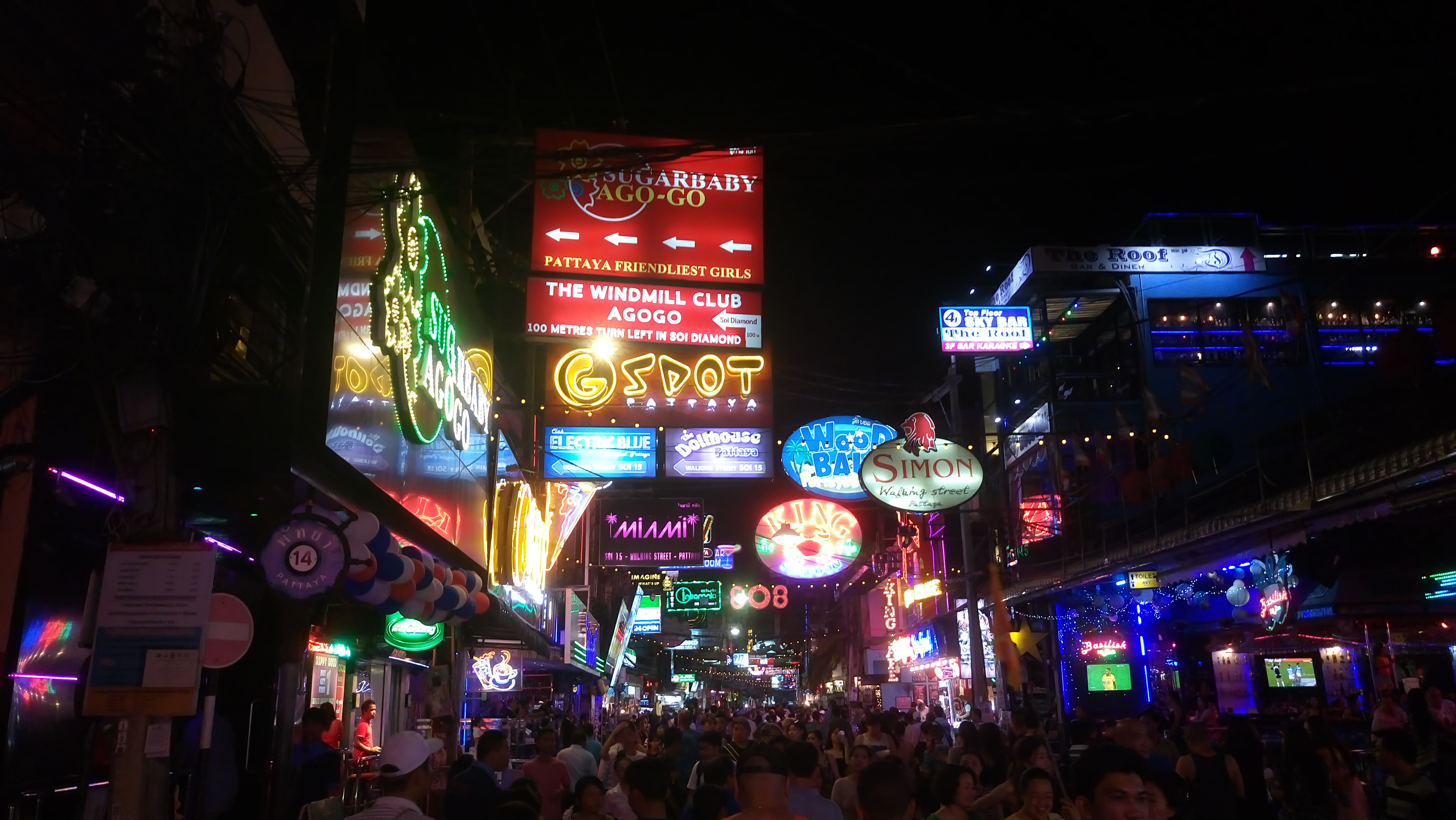
Walking Street, Pattaya

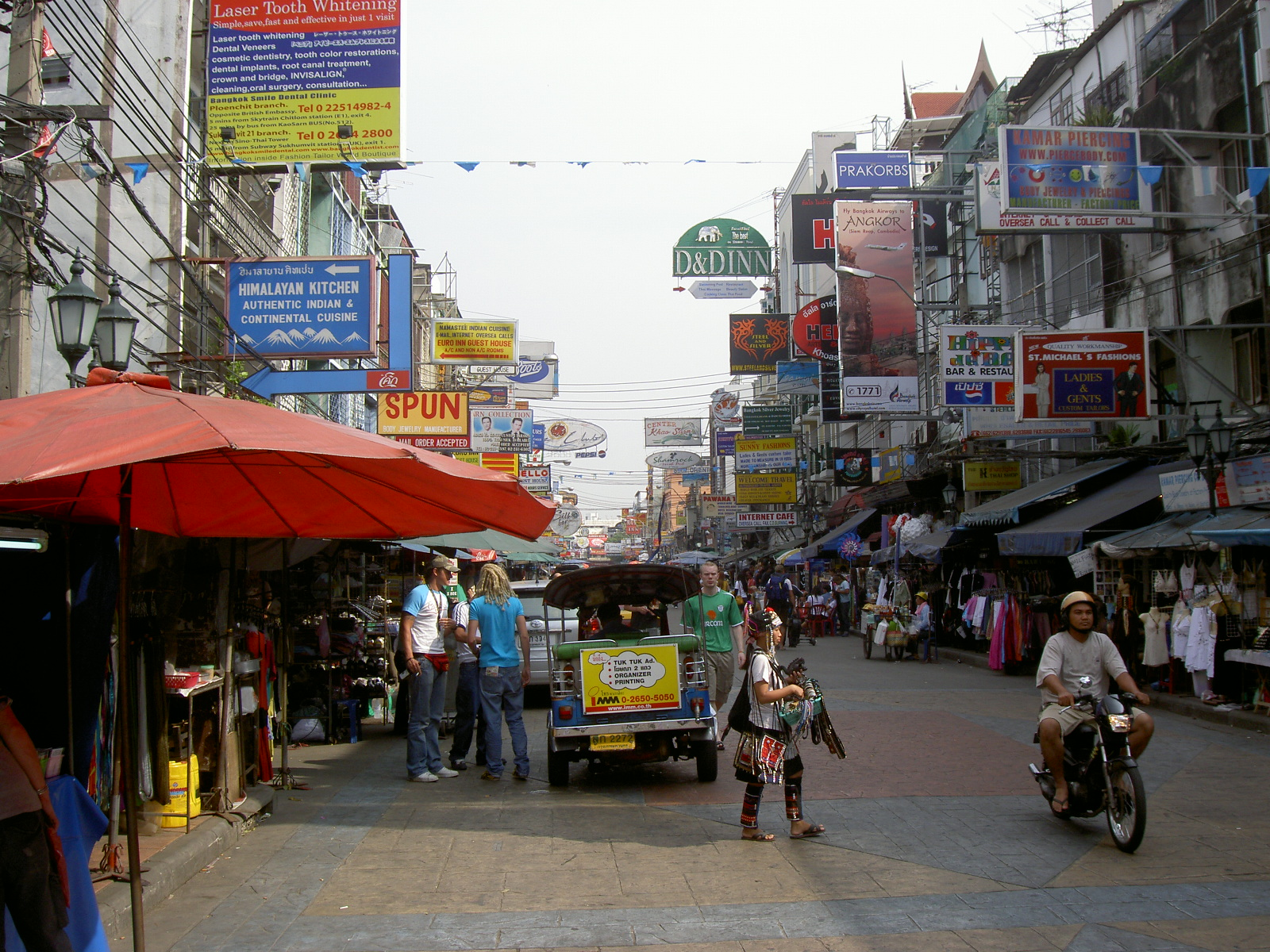
Khaosan Road, Bangkok

The Vietnam War hastened the modernisation and Westernisation of Thai society. The American presence and the exposure to Western culture that came with it had an effect on almost every aspect of Thai life. Before the late 1960s, full access to Western culture was limited to a highly educated elite in society, but the Vietnam War brought the outside world face to face with large segments of the Thai society as never before. With US dollars pumping up the economy, the service, transportation, and construction industries grew phenomenally as did drug abuse and prostitution, which using Thailand as a "Rest and Recreation" facility by US forces. The traditional rural family unit was broken down as more and more rural Thais moved to the city to find new jobs. This led to a clash of cultures as Thais were exposed to Western ideas about fashion, music, values, and moral standards.

The population began to grow explosively as the standard of living rose, and a flood of people began to move from the villages to the cities, and above all to Bangkok. Thailand had 30 million people in 1965, while by the end of the 20th century the population had doubled. Bangkok's population had grown tenfold since 1945 and had tripled since 1970.

Educational opportunities and exposure to mass media increased during the Vietnam War years. Bright university students learned more about ideas related to Thailand's economic and political systems, resulting in a revival of student activism. The Vietnam War period also saw the growth of the Thai middle class which gradually developed its own identity and consciousness.

Economic development did not bring prosperity to all. During the 1960s many of the rural poor felt increasingly dissatisfied with their condition in society and disillusioned by their treatment by the central government in Bangkok. Efforts by the Thai government to develop poor rural regions often did not have the desired effect in that they contributed to the farmers' awareness of how bad off they really were. It was not always the poorest of the poor who joined the anti-government insurgency. Increased government presence in the rural villages did little to improve the situation. Villagers became subject to increased military and police harassment and bureaucratic corruption. Villagers often felt betrayed when government promises of development were frequently not fulfilled. By the early 1970s rural discontent had manifested itself into a peasant's activist movement.

In 1972, hundreds of peasants, perhaps more than 3,000, suspected of supporting the communist rebellion, were massacred by the armed forces in Phattalung province in southern Thailand. Until then, communist suspects arrested by the army were usually shot and their bodies left behind. This time, the "red barrel" method was introduced to eliminate any possible evidence. Suspects were beaten into semi-consciousness before being thrown into barrels containing gasoline and burned alive.

=== The 1973 democracy movement ===
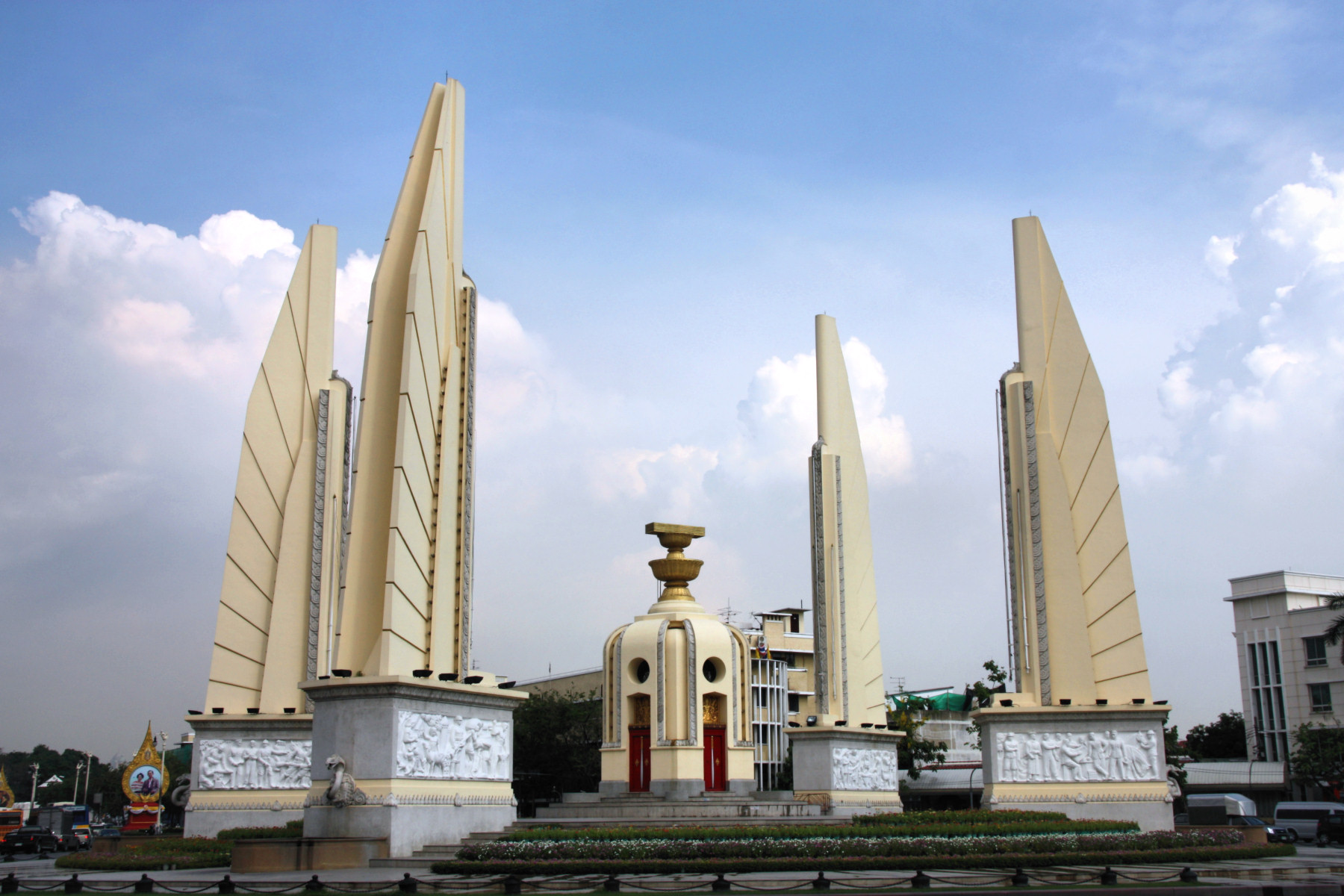
The Democracy Monument in Bangkok, built in 1940 to commemorate the end of the absolute monarchy in 1932, was the scene of massive demonstrations in 1973, 1976, 1992 and 2010.

With the dissatisfaction of pro-US policies of Military administration that allowed the US forces for using the country as a military base, the high rate of prostitution problems, the freedom of press and speech were limited and influx of the corruption that lead to inequality of social classes. Student demonstrations had started in 1968 and grew in size and numbers in the early 1970s despite the continued ban on political meetings. In June 1973, nine Ramkhamhaeng University students were expelled for publishing an article in a student newspaper that was critical of the government. Shortly after, thousands of students held a protest at the Democracy Monument demanding the re-enrolment of the nine students. The government ordered the universities to shut, but shortly afterwards allowed the students to be re-enrolled.

In October another 13 students were arrested on charges of conspiracy to overthrow the government. This time the student protesters were joined by workers, businessmen, and other ordinary citizens. The demonstrations swelled to several hundred thousand and the issue broadened from the release of the arrested students to demands for a new constitution and the replacement of the current government.

On 13 October, the government released the detainees. Leaders of the demonstrations, among them Seksan Prasertkul, called off the march in accordance with the wishes of the king who was publicly against the democracy movement. In a speech to graduating students, he criticised the pro-democracy movement by telling students to concentrate on their studies and leave politics to their elders [military government].

As the crowds were breaking up the next day (14 October), many students found themselves unable to leave because the police blocked the southern route to Rajavithi Road. Cornered and overwhelmed by the hostile crowd, the police responded with teargas and gunfire.

The military was called in, and tanks rolled down Ratchadamnoen Avenue and helicopters fired down at Thammasat University. A number of students commandeered buses and fire engines in an attempt to halt the progress of the tanks by ramming into them. With chaos on the streets, King Bhumibol opened the gates of Chitralada Palace to the students who were being gunned down by the army. Despite orders from Thanom that the military action be intensified, army commander Kris Sivara had the army withdrawn from the streets.

The king condemned the government's inability to handle the demonstrations and ordered Thanom, Praphas, and Narong to leave the country, and notably condemned the students' supposed role as well. At 18:10 Field Marshal Thanom Kittikachorn resigned from his post as prime minister. An hour later, the king appeared on national television, asking for calm, and announcing that Field Marshal Thanom Kittikachorn had been replaced with Dr. Sanya Dharmasakti, a respected law professor, as prime minister.

The 1973 Uprising brought about the most free era in Thai recent history, called an "age when democracy blossomed" and a "democratic experiment," which ended in the Thammasat University massacre and a coup on 6 October 1976.

=== Democratisation and setbacks ===
Post-1973 has been marked by a struggle to define the political contours of the state. It was won by the king and General Prem Tinsulanonda, who favoured a monarchial constitutional order.

The post-1973 years have seen a difficult and sometimes bloody transition from military to civilian rule, with several reversals along the way. The revolution of 1973 inaugurated a brief, unstable period of democracy, with military rule being reimposed after the 6 October 1976 Massacre. For most of the 1980s, Thailand was ruled by Prem Tinsulanonda, a democratically inclined strongman who restored parliamentary politics. Thereafter the country remained a democracy apart from a brief period of military rule from the 1991 Thai coup d'état for two years.

=== Shinawatra administration ===
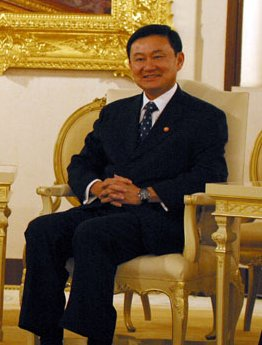
Thaksin Shinawatra, Prime Minister of Thailand, 2001–2006.

The populist Thai Rak Thai party, led by billionaire businessman Thaksin Shinawatra, was elected after a landslide electoral victory in 2001. Shinawatra was popular with the urban, suburban, and rural poor for his populist social programs. His rule came under attack from elites who saw danger in his "parliamentary dictatorship". In mid-2005, Sondhi Limthongkul, a well-known media tycoon, became the foremost Thaksin critic. Eventually, Sondhi and his allies developed the movement into a mass protest and later unified under the name of People's Alliance for Democracy (PAD).

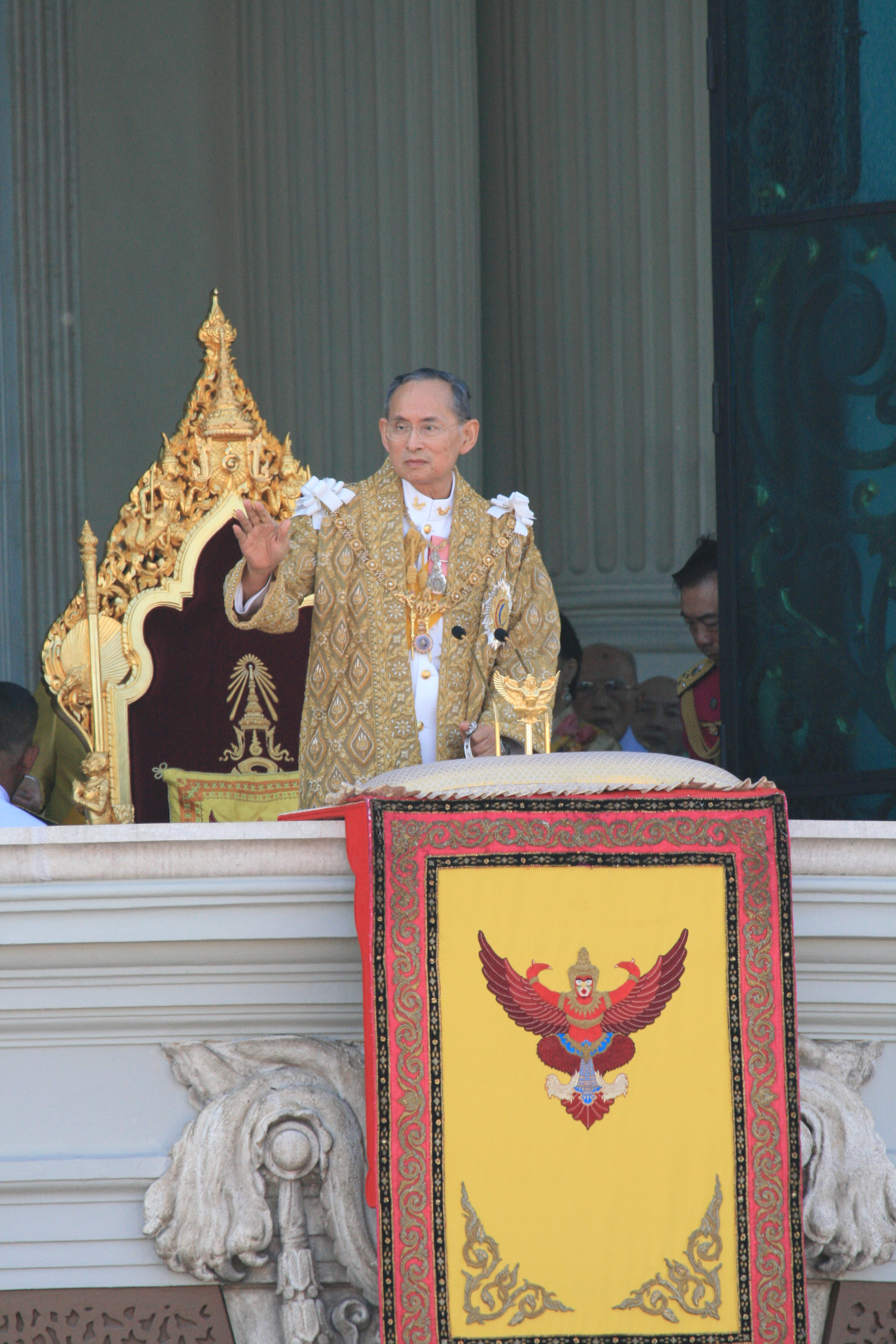
King Bhumibol in his birthday ceremony in 2007, celebrating his longest-reigning in Thai history.

On 19 September 2006, after the dissolution of parliament, Thaksin became head of a provisional government. While he was in New York for a meeting of the UN, Army Commander-in-Chief Lieutenant General Sonthi Boonyaratglin launched the bloodless September 2006 Thailand military coup d'état supported by anti-Thaksin elements in civil society and the Democrat Party. A general election on 23 December 2007 restored a civilian government, led by Samak Sundaravej of the People's Power Party, as a successor to Thai Rak Thai.

=== 2006 coup d'état ===
Without meeting much resistance, a military junta overthrew the interim government of Thaksin Shinawatra on 19 September 2006. The junta abrogated the constitution, dissolved Parliament and the Constitutional Court, detained and later removed several members of the government, declared martial law, and appointed one of the king's Privy Counselors, General Surayud Chulanont, as the Prime Minister. On 1 October 2006, Surayud Chulanont, the former head of Thailand's army, was sworn in as interim prime minister. The junta later wrote a highly abbreviated interim constitution and appointed a panel to draft a new permanent constitution. The junta also appointed a 250-member legislature, called by some critics a "chamber of generals" while others claimed that it lacks representatives from the poor majority.

In this interim constitution draft, the head of the junta was allowed to remove the prime minister at any time. The legislature was not allowed to hold a vote of confidence against the cabinet and the public was not allowed to file comments on bills. This interim constitution was later surpassed by the permanent constitution on 24 August 2007. Martial law was partially revoked in January 2007. The ban on political activities was lifted in July 2007, following the 30 May dissolution of the Thai Rak Thai party. The new constitution was approved by referendum on 19 August, which led to a return to a democratic general election on 23 December 2007.

=== 2008–2010 political crisis ===
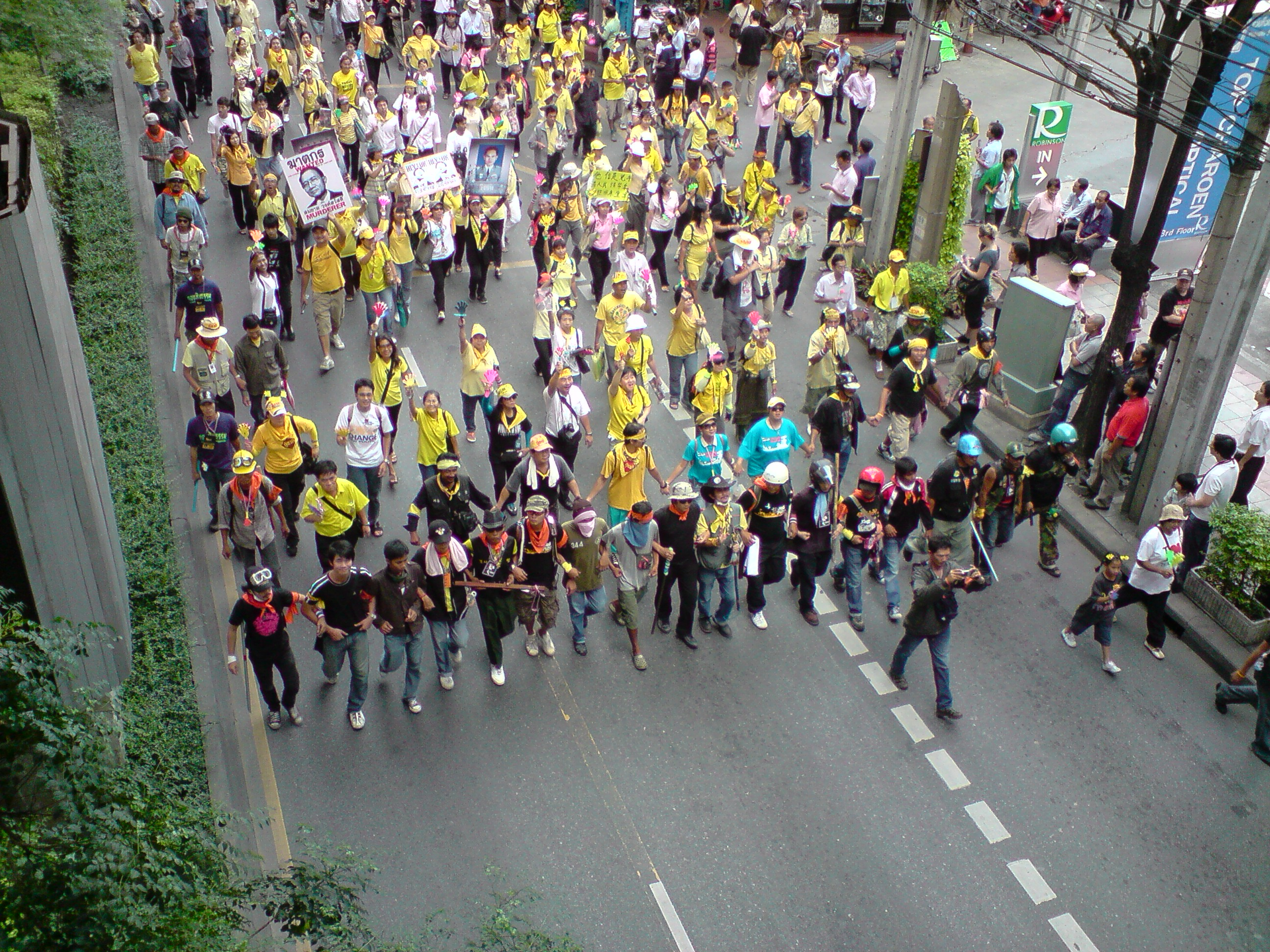
People's Alliance for Democracy, Yellow Shirts, rally on Sukhumvit Road in 2008.

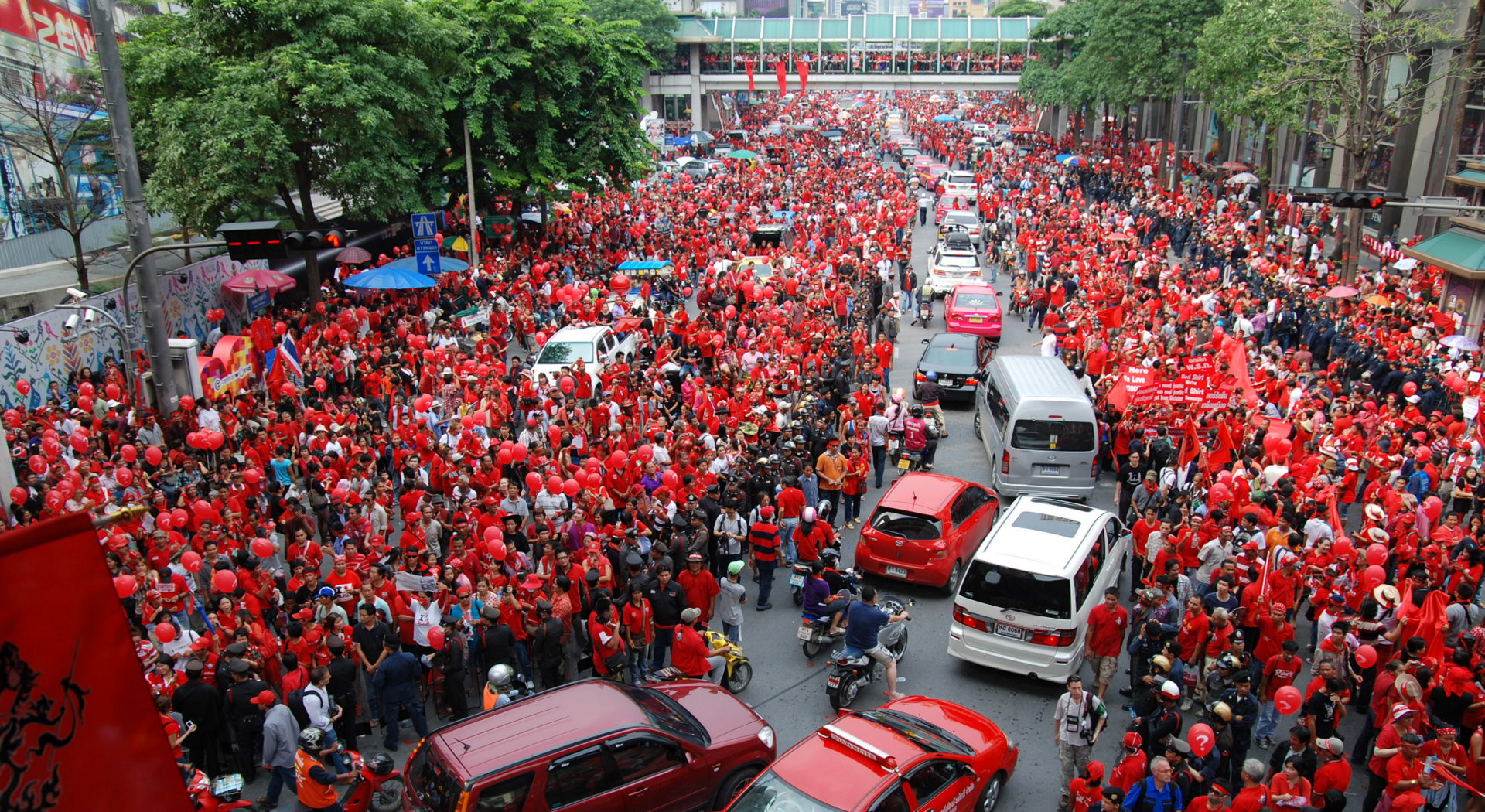
United Front for Democracy Against Dictatorship, Red Shirts, protest on Ratchaprasong intersection in 2010.

The People's Power Party (Thailand) (PPP), led by Samak Sundaravej formed a government with five smaller parties. Following several court rulings against him in a variety of scandals, and surviving a vote of no confidence, and protesters blockading government buildings and airports, in September 2008, Sundaravej was found guilty of conflict of interest by the Constitutional Court of Thailand (due to being host of a TV cooking program), and thus, ended his term in office.

He was replaced by PPP member Somchai Wongsawat. As of October 2008, Wongsawat was unable to gain access to his offices, which were occupied by protesters from the People's Alliance for Democracy. On 2 December 2008, Thailand's Constitutional Court in a highly controversial ruling found the Peoples Power Party (PPP) guilty of electoral fraud, which led to the dissolution of the party according to the law. It was later alleged in media reports that at least one member of the judiciary had a telephone conversation with officials working for the Office of the Privy Council and one other person. The phone call was taped and has since circulated on the Internet. In it, the callers discuss finding a way to ensure the ruling PPP party would be disbanded. Accusations of judicial interference were levelled in the media but the recorded call was dismissed as a hoax. However, in June 2010, supporters of the eventually disbanded PPP were charged with tapping a judge's phone.

Immediately following what many media described as a "judicial coup", a senior member of the armed forces met with factions of the governing coalition to get their members to join the opposition and the Democrat Party was able to form a government, a first for the party since 2001. The leader of the Democrat Party, and former leader of the opposition, Abhisit Vejjajiva was appointed and sworn in as the 27th Prime Minister, together with a new cabinet, on 17 December 2008.

In April 2009, protests by the National United Front of Democracy Against Dictatorship (UDD, or "Red Shirts") forced the cancellation of the Fourth East Asia Summit after protesters stormed the Royal Cliff Hotel venue in Pattaya, smashing the glass doors of the venue to gain entry, and a blockade prevented the Chinese premier at the time, Wen Jiabao, from attending.

About a year later, a set of new Red Shirts protests resulted in 87 deaths (mostly civilian and some military) and 1,378 injured. When the army tried to disperse protesters on 10 April 2010, the army was met with automatic gunfire, grenades, and fire bombs from an opposition faction in the army. This resulted in the army returning fire with rubber bullets and some live ammunition. During the time of the Red Shirt protests against the government, there were numerous grenade and bomb attacks against government offices and the homes of government officials. Gas grenades were fired at Yellow Shirt protesters who were protesting against the Red Shirts and in favour of the government, by unknown gunmen killing one pro-government protester, the government stated that the Red Shirts were firing the weapons at civilians. Red Shirts continued to hold a position in the business district of Bangkok and it was shut down for several weeks.

On 3 July 2011, the opposition Pheu Thai Party, led by Yingluck Shinawatra (the youngest sister of Thaksin Shinawatra), won the general election by a landslide (265 seats in the House of Representatives, out of 500). She had never previously been involved in politics, Pheu Thai campaigning for her with the slogan "Thaksin thinks, Pheu Thai acts". Yingluck was the nation's first female prime minister and her role was officially endorsed in a ceremony presided over by King Bhumibol Adulyadej. The Pheu Thai Party is a continuation of Thaksin's Thai Rak Thai party.

=== 2013–2014 political crisis ===
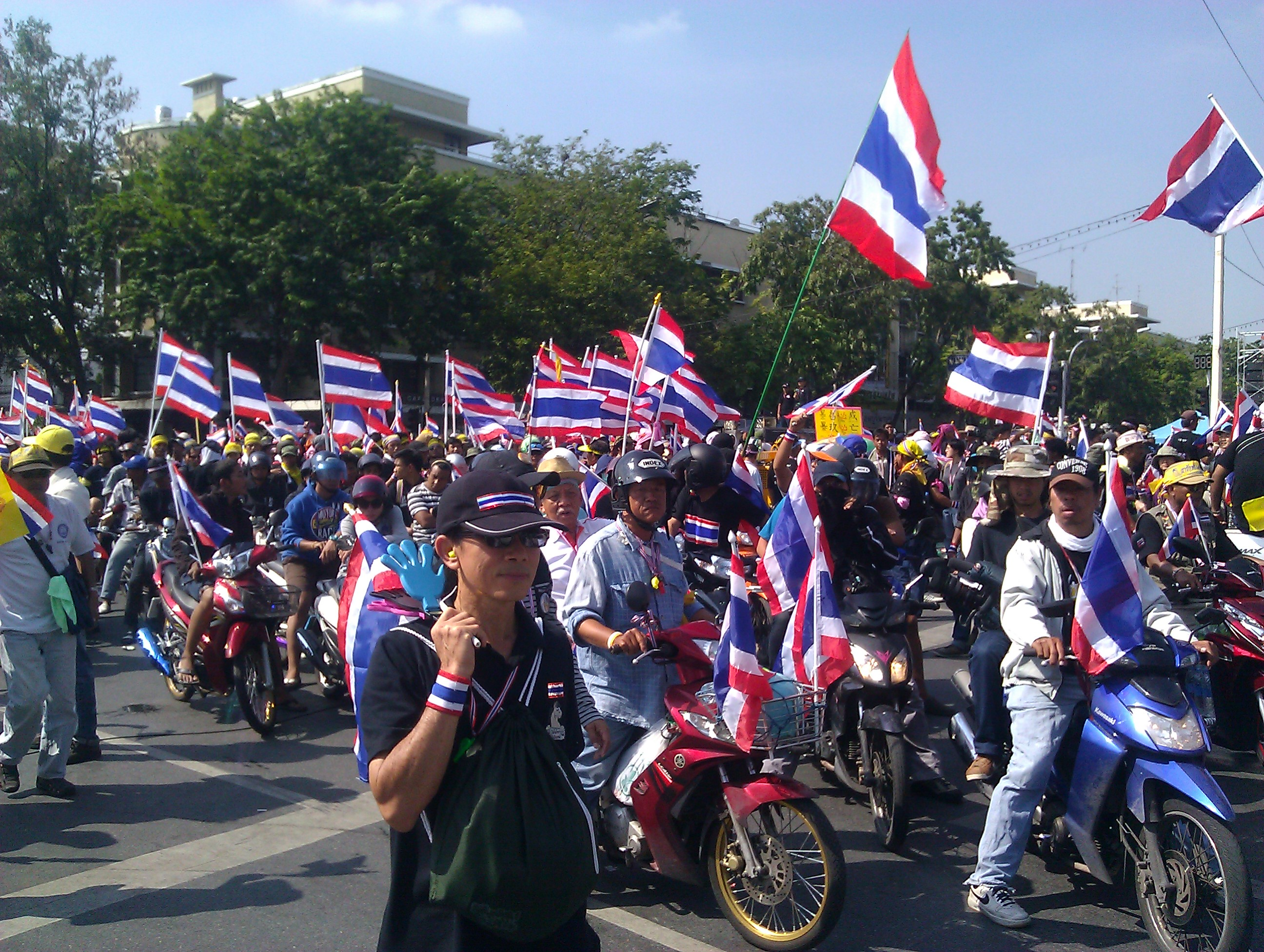
Protesters mobilising, 1 December 2013

Protests recommenced in late 2013, as a broad alliance of protesters, led by former opposition deputy leader Suthep Thaugsuban, demanded an end to the Thaksin regime. A blanket amnesty for people involved in the 2010 protests, altered at the last minute to include all political crimes, including all convictions against Thaksin, triggered a mass show of discontent, with numbers variously estimated between 98,500 (the police) and 400,000 (an aerial photo survey done by the Bangkok Post), taking to the streets. The Senate was urged to reject the bill to quell the reaction, but the measure failed. A newly named group, the People's Democratic Reform Committee (PDRC) along with allied groups, escalated the pressure, with the opposition Democrat party resigning en masse to create a parliamentary vacuum. Protesters demand variously evolved as the movement's numbers grew, extending a number of deadlines and demands that became increasingly unreasonable or unrealistic, yet attracting a groundswell of support. They called for the establishment of an indirectly elected "people's council", in place of Yingluck's government, that would cleanse Thai politics and eradicate the Thaksin regime.

In response to the protests, Yingluck dissolved parliament on 9 December 2013 and proposed a new election for 2 February 2014, a date that was later approved by the election commission. The PDRC insisted that the prime minister stand down within 24 hours, regardless of her actions, with 160,000 protesters in attendance at Government House on 9 December. Yingluck insisted that she would continue her duties until the scheduled election in February 2014, urging the protesters to accept her proposal: "Now that the government has dissolved parliament, I ask that you stop protesting and that all sides work towards elections. I have backed down to the point where I don't know how to back down any further."

In response to the Electoral Commission (EC)'s registration process for party-list candidates—for the scheduled election in February 2014—anti-government protesters marched to the Thai-Japanese sports stadium, the venue of the registration process, on 22 December 2013. Suthep and the PDRC led the protest, which security forces claimed that approximately 270,000 protesters joined. Yingluck and the Pheu Thai Party reiterated their election plan and anticipated presenting a list of 125 party-list candidates to the EC.

On 7 May 2014, the Constitutional Court ruled that Yingluck would have to step down as the prime minister as she was deemed to have abused her power in transferring a high-level government official. On 21 August 2014 she was replaced by army chief General Prayut Chan-o-cha.

=== 2014 coup d'état ===
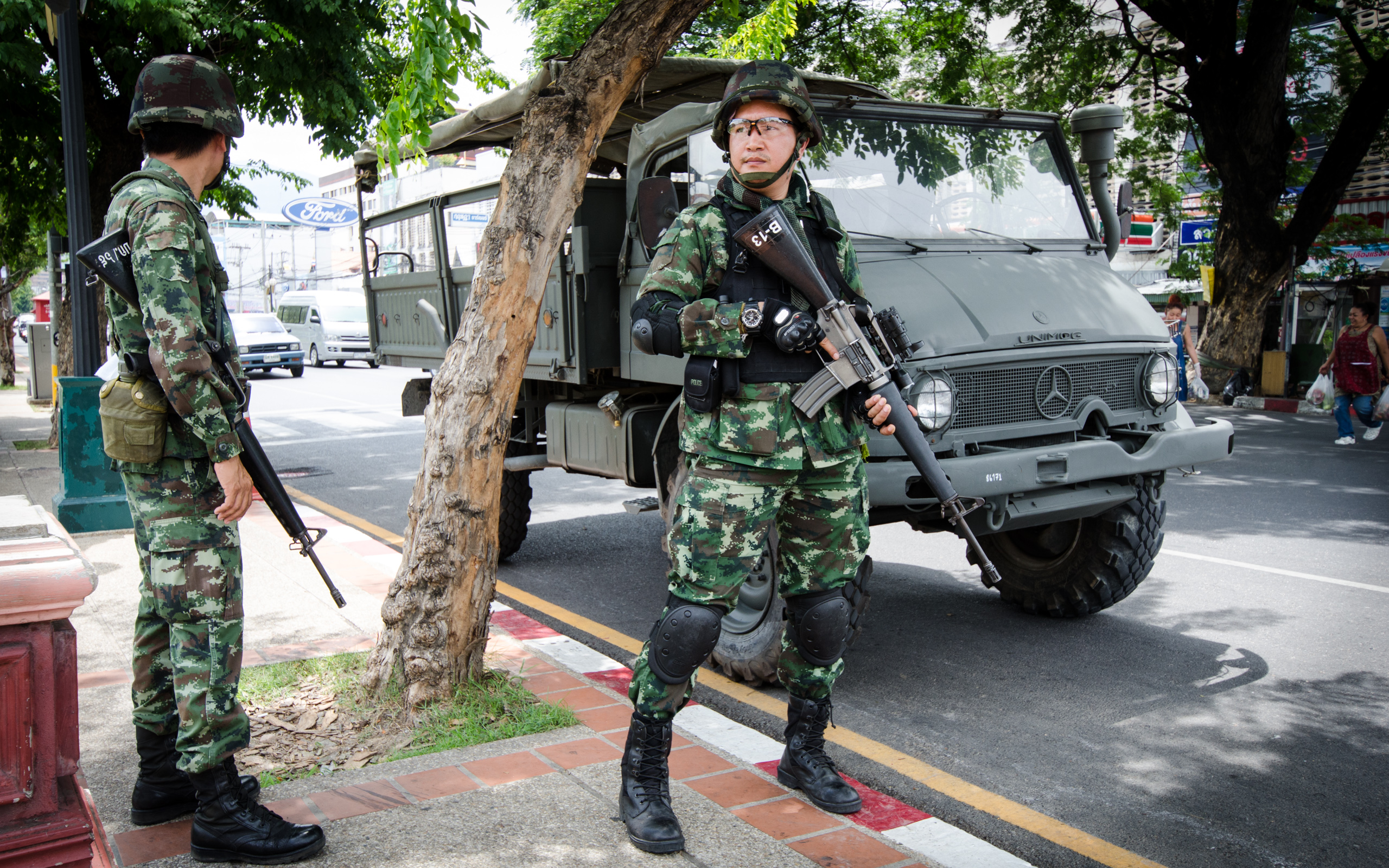
Thai soldiers at the Chang Phueak Gate in Chiang Mai.

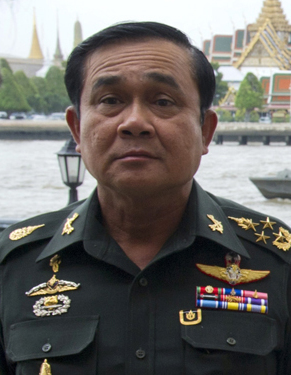
General Prayut Chan-o-cha, the coup leader

On 20 May 2014 the Thai army declared martial law and began to deploy troops in the capital, denying that it was a coup attempt. On 22 May, the army admitted that it was a coup and that it was taking control of the country and suspending the country's constitution. On the same day, the military imposed a curfew between the hours of 22:00–05:00, ordering citizens and visitors to remain indoors during this period. On 21 August 2014 the National Assembly of Thailand elected the army chief, General Prayut Chan-o-cha, as prime minister. Martial law was declared formally ended on 1 April 2015. "Uniformed or ex-military men have led Thailand for 55 of the 83 years since absolute monarchy was overthrown in 1932,..." observed one journalist in 2015.

The rise of fascism in Thailand began around the coup, first coined by James Taylor of University of Adelaide in 2011, after the junta took control, academics and political commentators started to identify a political system by fascism. Pithaya Pookaman and James Taylor called it 'New Right' consisting of ultraconservatives, reactionaries, semi-fascists, pseudo-intellectuals and former leftists. John Draper, an academic and political commentator, noted that the rise of fascism in Thailand began in 2014. The King's sufficient economy was mentioned that it serves as one of the ideological foundations of the military regime, and reminiscent of fascist regimes in Europe in the 1930s.

=== Military Junta (2014–2019) ===
The ruling junta led by Prayuth Chan-o-cha promised to hold new elections, but wanted to enact a new constitution before the elections were held. An initial draft constitution was rejected by government officials in 2015. A national referendum, the first since the 2014 coup, on a newly drafted constitution was held on 7 August 2016. There was a 55% turnout of which around 61% voted in favour of the constitution. Under the new constitution an unelected person other than a member of parliament can be appointed as Prime Minister, which would open the post to a military official. The new constitution also gives the National Council for Peace and Order the authority to make all the appointments to the 250-member Senate in the next government.

== Vajiralongkorn period (2016–present) ==
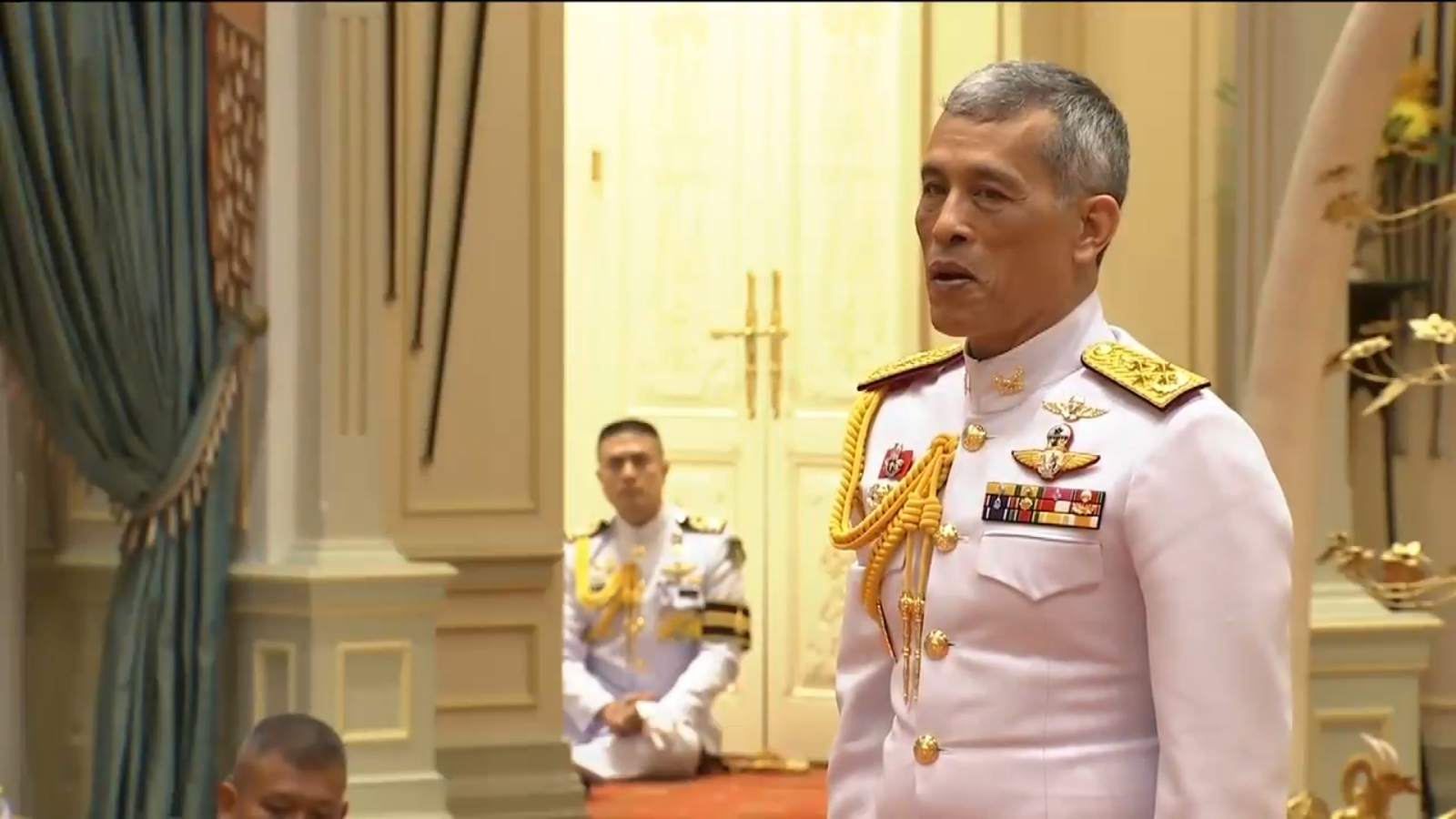
King Vajiralongkorn, the current monarch of Thailand

On 13 October 2016, King Bhumibol Adulyadej of Thailand died at the age of 89, in Siriraj Hospital in Bangkok. On the night of 1 December 2016, the fiftieth day after the death of Bhumibol, Regent Prem Tinsulanonda led the heads of the country's three branches of government to an audience with Vajiralongkorn to invite him to ascend to the throne as the tenth king of the Chakri dynasty. In April 2017, King Vajiralongkorn signs the new constitution which will aid in the return to democracy.

In May 2017, Bangkok hospital was bombed, wounding 24 people on the third anniversary of the military coup of 2014.

In June 2019, both houses of Thailand's parliament elected Prayuth Chan-ocha, retired general and former military junta leader, as the country's next prime minister. The vote officially restored civilian rule in Thailand. The opposition complained of voting irregularities in the 24 March elections.

In February 2020, pro-democracy party Future Forward, the third largest party in the parliament with 80 seats, was disbanded. The ruling was made by the Constitutional Court, because of a donation the party's founder, Thanathorn Juangroongruangkit, made for the party.

The COVID-19 pandemic affected Thailand as the first country outside China, on 13 January 2020. By 2023, the pandemic declined but caused a total of 34,715 casualties.

In September 2022, Thailand's Constitutional Court ruled that Prime Minister Prayuth Chan-ocha can stay in office. The opposition had challenged him, because the new constitution limits the term for prime minister as a total period of eight years in office. The Constitutional Court's ruling was that his term in office began in April 2017, simultaneously with the new constitution, although General Prayuth had ruled as the leader of the government since the 2014 military coup.

In May 2023, Thailand's reformist opposition, the progressive Move Forward Party (MFP) and the populist Pheu Thai Party, won the general election, meaning the royalist-military parties that supported Prime Minister Prayuth Chan-ocha lost power. Initially, the opposition parties attempted to form a government together with MFP's Pita Limjaroenrat as prime ministerial candidate. This failed despite a majority in the lower house, as under the 2017 constitution the junta-appointed Senate also voted for the prime minister along with the elected lower house. Pheu Thai then dissolved its coalition with MFP and allied instead with the royalist-military parties, which allowed the new coalition to garner votes in the military-dominated Senate. On 22 August 2023, its candidate Srettha Thavisin became Thailand's new prime minister, while the Pheu Thai party's billionaire figurehead Thaksin Shinawatra returned to Thailand after years in self-imposed exile.

Same-sex marriage was legalized by the House of Representatives on 23 January 2025. Thailand is the first country in Southeast Asia and the 38th in the world to legalize it.

The 2025 Thai political crisis, was caused by a leaked phone call between then-Prime Minister Paetongtarn Shinawatra and Cambodian senate president Hun Sen amidst a major border conflict. Shinawatra was eventually removed from office by the Constitutional Court. Anutin Charnvirakul became the 32nd Prime Minister of Thailand on 7 September 2025.

== Historical maps ==
These maps show the territorial evolution of Thailand through the ages.

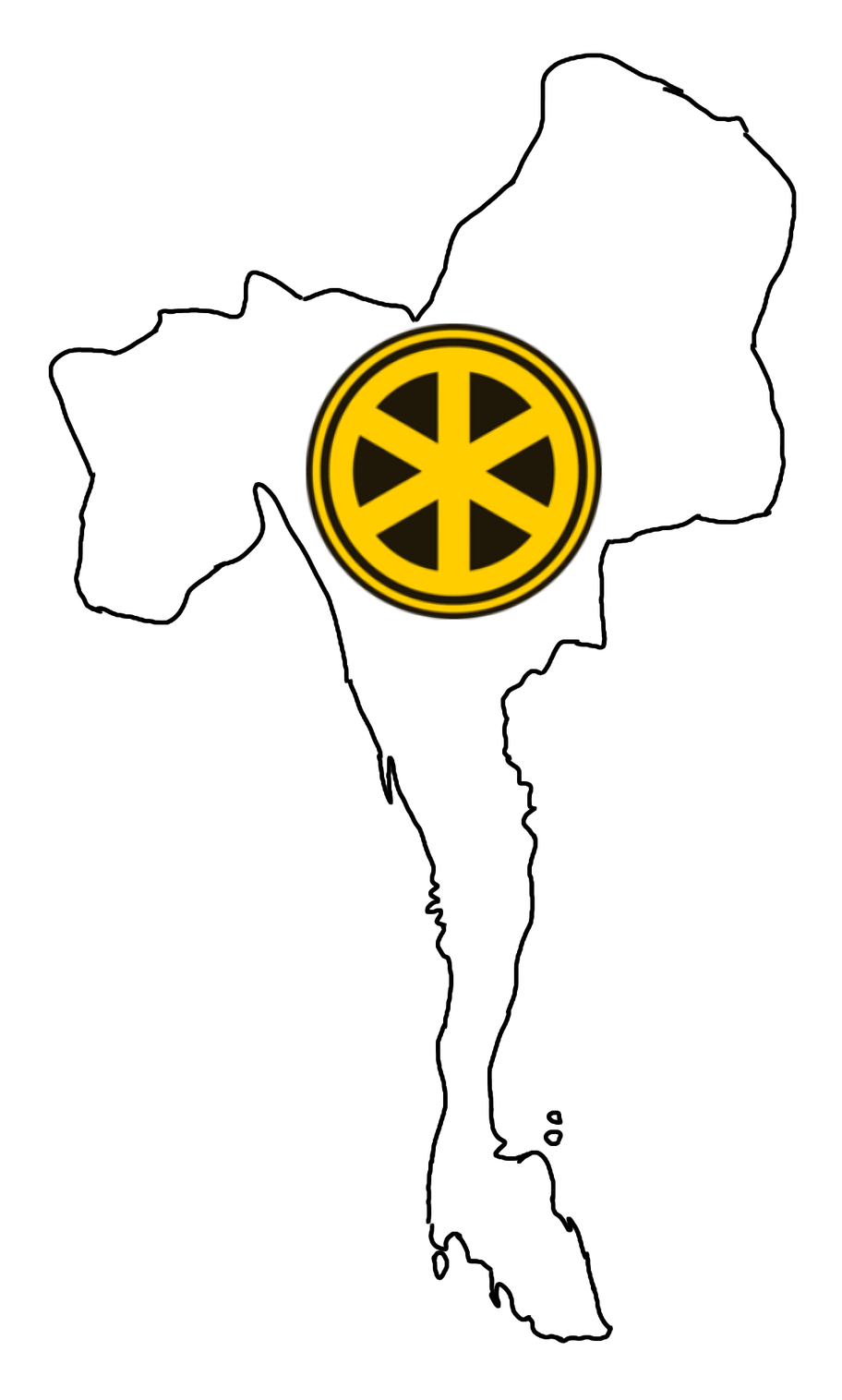
Map of the Sukhothai Kingdom, 1238-1351

1368 (Uthong)

1390 (Ramesuan)

1432 (Borommarachathirat II)

1468 (Borommatrailokkanat)

1545 (Chairachathirat)

1603 (Sanphet II)

1680 (Ramathibodi III)

1686 (Ramathibodi III)

1727 (Sanphet IX)

1767 (Borommaracha III)

1780 (Borommaracha IV)

1800 (Rama I)

1805 (Rama I)

1824 (Rama II)

1837 (Rama III)

1850 (Rama III)

1862 (Rama IV)

1882 (Rama V)

1890 (Rama V)

1893 (Rama V)

1900 (Rama V)

1906 (Rama V)

1908 (Rama V)

1916 (Rama VI)

1932 (Rama VII)

1941 (Rama VIII)

1945 (Rama VIII)

1946 (Rama VIII)

1950 (Rama IX)

1973 (Rama IX)

2023 (Rama X)

== See also ==
- Dhamma Society Fund
- History of Bangkok
- History of Southeast Asia
- History of Isan
- History of the Thai Forest Tradition
- List of Thai monarchs
  - Monarchs' family tree
- List of prime ministers of Thailand
- Peopling of Thailand
- Politics of Thailand
- Reactions to the death of Bhumibol Adulyadej
- Siam Society
- Thai cultural mandates
- Thai studies
- Thaification
- South Thailand insurgency
