= 2013 in Thailand =

- Decades: 1990s; 2000s; 2010s; 2020s; 2030s
- See also: Other events of 2013; Timeline of Thai history

The year 2013 was the 232nd year of the Rattanakosin Kingdom of Thailand. It was the 68th year in the reign of King Bhumibol Adulyadej (Rama IX), and is reckoned as year 2556 in the Buddhist Era. The year saw the beginning of protests against Prime Minister Yingluck Shinawatra's government which led to a state of political crisis and the dissolution of government.

== Incumbents ==
- King: Bhumibol Adulyadej
- Crown Prince: Vajiralongkorn
- Prime Minister: Yingluck Shinawatra
- Supreme Patriarch:
  - until 24 October: Nyanasamvara Suvaddhana

== Events ==
=== January ===
- 23 January - A court in Thailand sentences a magazine editor to ten years' imprisonment for publishing articles that were deemed to have insulted the monarchy.

=== February ===
- 10 February - A roadside bombing in Yala Province kills 5 soldiers and injures three others.
- 13 February –16 Muslim insurgents are killed during an attack on a military base in Narathiwat.
- 25 February - At least 4 people are dead and 20 injured after a homemade bomb is detonated at a Buddhist festival in Maha Sarakham Province.
- 28 February - Thailand agrees to peace talks with Muslim rebels for the first time after 20 years of conflict.

=== March ===
- 2 March - Suspected insurgents detonate a motorcycle bomb in Southern Thailand killing 2 Thai Military rangers and wounding 11 people.
- 3 March:
  - 2013 Bangkok gubernatorial election took place. Sukhumbhand Paribatra, a Democrat, wins the election with 47.75% of the national vote.
  - Thailand promises to put an end to legal ivory trade within the country.
- 22 March - The 2013 Thailand refugee camp fire lead to 37 reported deaths.

=== June ===
- 29 June - Eight soldiers killed by roadside bomb in south Thailand.

=== July ===
- 27 July - The Rayong oil spill occurred in the Gulf of Thailand.
- 28 July - Heavy rain causes 30 metres of the Uttamanusorn Bridge in Kanchanaburi province to collapse. The amount collapsed increases to 70 metres three days after.

=== September ===
- Tropical Depression 18W (2013) took place in mid September.

=== November ===
- 7 November - Intergovernmental Agreement on Dry Ports was a United Nations treaty that became opened for signature.

=== December ===
- 22 December - 22 December 2013 South Thailand bombings

== Births ==
- 17 October – Phanchanokchon Phansang

== Sport ==
=== September ===
- September 21–29 - 2013 PTT Thailand Open took place. Milos Raonic was the champion of 2013 PTT Thailand Open – Singles. Jamie Murray and John Peers were the champions for the 2013 PTT Thailand Open – Doubles.

== See also ==
- 2013 Thai Premier League
- 2013 Thai Division 1 League
- 2013 in Thai television
- List of Thai films of 2013
