= Terrorism in Thailand =

Incidents of terrorism in Thailand are mostly related to the South Thailand insurgency, which has been going on for decades. Sporadic incidents have also occurred elsewhere (mostly in Bangkok), although such events are much less common.

== List of notable terrorist incidents ==
- 1972 Israeli Bangkok Embassy hostage crisis
- 1999 Burmese Embassy Siege
- 2006 Bangkok bombings
- 2012 Bangkok bombings
- South Thailand insurgency
  - December 2009 Narathiwat bombing
  - 2005 Songkhla bombings
  - 2006 Hat Yai bombings
  - 2007 South Thailand bombings
  - 2007 Songkhla bombings
  - 2012 Southern Thailand bombings
  - 2019 Yala attack
- 2015 Bangkok bombing
- August 2016 Thailand bombings
- 2019 Bangkok bombings

== External sources ==
- Works related to Anti-Terrorist Financing Act, BE 2556 (2013) at Wikisource
- Works related to Internal Security Act, BE 2551 (2008) at Wikisource
- Works related to Emergency Decree on Public Administration in State of Emergency, BE 2548 (2005) at Wikisource
