= 2011 in Thailand =

- Decades: 1990s; 2000s; 2010s; 2020s
- See also: Other events of 2011; Timeline of Thai history

The year 2011 was the 230th year of the Rattanakosin Kingdom of Thailand. It was the 66th year in the reign of King Bhumibol Adulyadej (Rama IX), and is reckoned as year 2554 in the Buddhist Era. The year saw the election of Yingluck Shinawatra as prime minister, as well as the worst flooding in the country's history.

== Incumbents ==
- King: Bhumibol Adulyadej
- Crown Prince: Vajiralongkorn
- Prime Minister:
  - until 5 August: Abhisit Vejjajiva
  - starting 5 August: Yingluck Shinawatra
- Supreme Patriarch: Nyanasamvara Suvaddhana

== Events ==
=== May ===
- Thailand's Got Talent (season 1) ended on May 29 with the Results Final.

=== July ===
- 2011 Thai general election took place on July 3, 2011. Yingluck Shinawatra became the first female prime minister in the history of Thailand.

=== October ===
- 2011 PTT Thailand Open ended on October 2. Andy Murray won the singles tournament and Oliver Marach and Aisam-ul-Haq Qureshi won the doubles tournament.

== See also ==
- 2011 Thai Premier League
- 2011 Thai Division 1 League
- 2011 Southern Thailand floods
- 2011 in Thai football
- Thailand at the 2011 Southeast Asian Games
- Thailand's Got Talent (season 1)
- 2011 in Thai television
- List of Thai films of 2011
