= 2019 Bangkok bombings =

Attacks in Thailand

2019 Bangkok Bombings
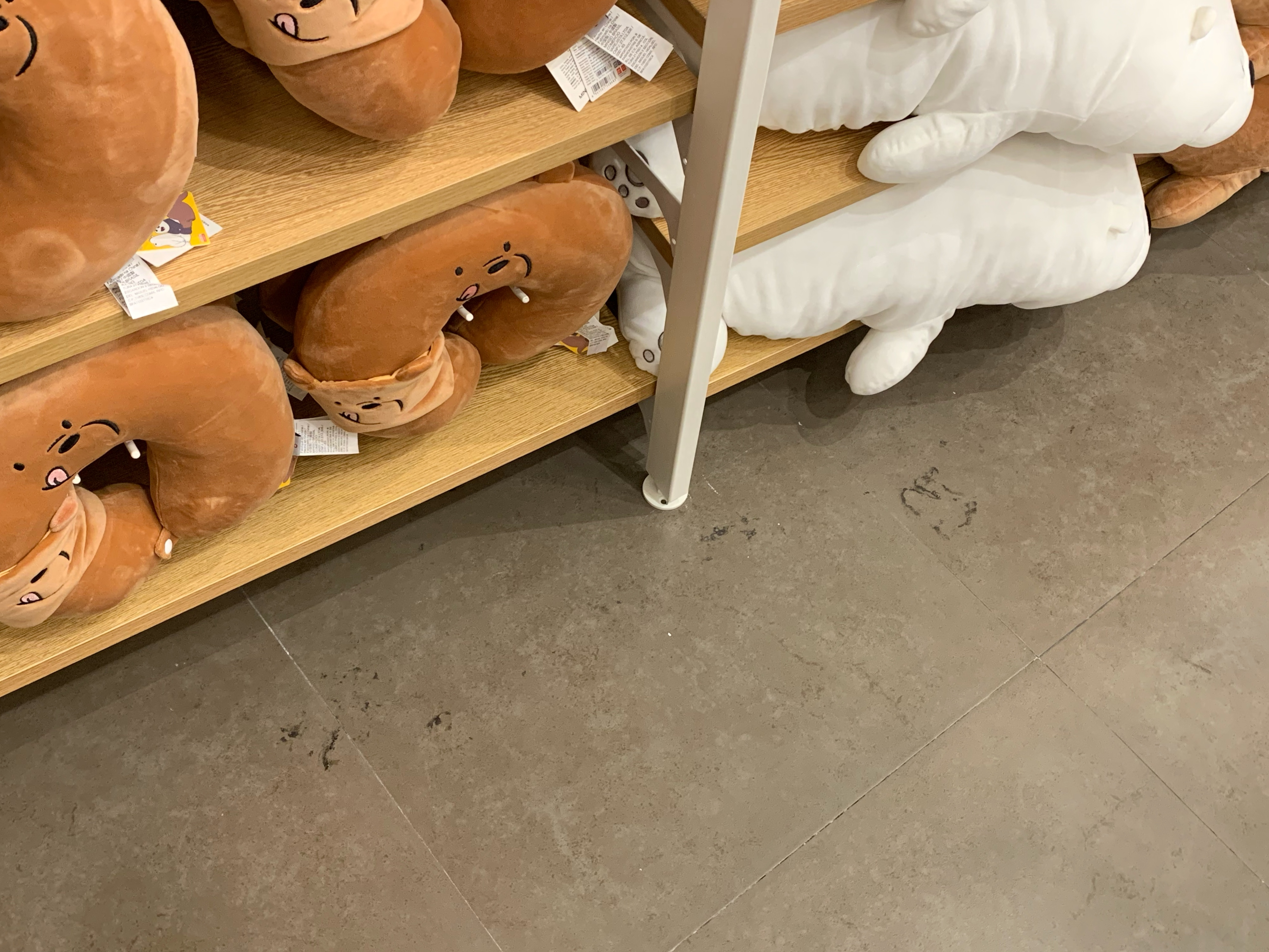
- Remnants on site of the minor bombing at a store in Siam Square

- Location of Blasts
- Location: Bangkok, Thailand
- Date: 2 August 2019 (UTC+07:00)
- Attack type: Terrorist attack
- Weapon: Bombs
- Injuries: 7
- Perpetrator: Muslim separatists (suspected)

On 2 August 2019, series of small bombs have detonated over five locations throughout Bangkok Metropolitan Area. The blasts location included Chong Nonsi BTS Station, near the King Power Mahanakhon tower, the Chaengwattana Government Complex, the Royal Thai Armed Forces Headquarters, and inside a branch of Miniso at Siam Square One. The blasts have resulted in total of seven injuries.

The initial investigation carried out by Thai police has reported that the suspect of the insurgent is related to the same group that has carried out similar attack during 2016. The bombings also coincided with an ASEAN summit that was taking place in the city.

== Attack ==
On 2 August 2019, at 04:45 Bangkok time (UTC+7.00), a minor bomb detonated at a branch of Miniso, a utility goods store, in Siam Square One shopping center, Pathum Wan District. The bomb was stuffed inside a doll from the We Bare Bears cartoon series. The shelves and goods in the store were damaged, no one was injured as the store was not yet opened. The security camera later revealed that the bomb was planted by a masked man covered in sunglasses the day before. The store remained closed for two days for maintenance on damaged shelves.

At 07:00 local time, four bombs at the Chaengwattana Government Complex has been reported to the local police station. The first two bombs has detonated in front of the entrance of the Government complex, while followed by the third bomb that has exploded in front of the Royal Thai Armed Forces Headquarters. The fourth bomb was successfully defused by the EOD at the building B of the government complex. There is no reported of death or injury.

At 08:00 local time, two bomb has been detonated in front of the Chong Nonsi BTS Station, and at the entrance of the King Power Mahanakhon Tower, which is followed by a suspect object was reported that was located in front of the BTS entrance. The local police has destroyed the suspect bombing device by high pressure water gun. Two injuries has been reported, and no death was reported.

At 8:50 local time, the seventh bomb has detonated in Rama Nine District yaek 57/1, which has resulted in total of 4 injuries and 2 serious injuries. Many false positive suspect of bombing device has been reported after the first 3 incidents.

The ASEAN summit was not disrupted.

== Investigation ==
The initial investigation reported by the National Intelligence Agency (NIA) reported that this attacked could potentially be linked to an expansion of operations by the insurgents that were supported by the opposition leader of the government. However, the Royal Thai police led by the police chief Chakthip Chaijinda reported that this incident is perpetrated by the same group of insurgents that has carried out similar attacked in seven southern district in 2016.

The explosive device reported by the Royal Thai Police was believed to be a homemade bomb that has a size of a tennis ball. Although the motives of this attack remain unknown, it appears to have been an attack on the country's image as Bangkok hosted an ASEAN Summit, where political leaders from each southeast Asian nation have attended the summit, and also other nation representatives, such as the UK foreign secretary, US secretary of State, and China's Diplomat.

The Royal Thai Police has ordered the Crime Suppression Division (CSD) to further investigate the attacks that happened on the 2 August. The Crime Suppression Division has work closely with the Office of the Attorney-General (OAG) to gather intelligence and evidence on the attacks and has reported that the attacks was planned near the Thai-Malaysian border.

On 5 August, the Royal Thai Police has published a report regarding the attack, the attack was orchestrated by group of 15 people, where the evidence was drawn from inquiry of the 2 suspects that were arrested on the 2nd of August. While the inquiry, the police has examine the blasting site, and has gathered CCTV evidence and fingerprint and DNA sample from the site. The Office of Police Forensic Science has examined the sample and has crossed check with the criminal profile to narrow down the search for the other 13 suspects.

On 16 August, the Royal Thai Police led by Srivara Rangsibrahmanakul has issued arrest warrants to 9 different suspects, the authorities also has claim that some of the suspect may have criminal background. While the other 2 suspects that has been arrested on the 2nd of August has been temporary imprison with court order.

On 2 September at the Crime Suppression Division, another 2 suspects that has been arrested in the Narathiwat province, the 2 suspects has denied all allegations against all of their alleged charged. The 2 suspects has been accused of handing over the explosive device to the bombers at various location on 2 August. The DNA and fingerprint samples have been collected by the Forensic Science Police officers to cross check with the sample that was collected at the blasting site.

By 4 September, the Criminal Court had issued in total of 14 arrest warrants and has arrested in total of 3 suspects.

== Reaction ==
The military junta leader Prayut Chan-o-cha respond to this attack by condemning to those who planned the attack and has destroyed the peace and order to the country. While the Deputy Prime Minister Prawit Wongsuwan has told the reporter that the insurgent was orchestrated to create a situation to embarrassed the government as the city hosted ASEAN summit.

Chief Police Chaktip Chaijinda also believe that the motives behind the attack was believed to be political related, as Thailand held its first general election in March since the 2014 Thai coup d'état. Nonetheless, many government opposition believe that this attacks was responsible by the government itself in order to divert the public attention on the current poor public image of the government.

== Other arrests, detentions, and prosecutions ==
On 2 August, two suspect were arrested in front of the Royal Thai Police headquarters, and sent to temporary confinement. Other two suspects that help orchestrated the attacks were also arrested in the southern province of Thailand on the 2nd of September.

== See also ==
- 2012 Bangkok Bombings
- 2015 Bangkok Bombings
- August 2016 Thailand bombings
