= 2012 in Thailand =

- Decades: 1990s; 2000s; 2010s; 2020s
- See also: Other events of 2012; Timeline of Thai history

The year 2012 was the 231st year of the Rattanakosin Kingdom of Thailand. It was the 67th year in the reign of King Bhumibol Adulyadej (Rama IX), and is reckoned as year 2555 in the Buddhist Era.

== Incumbents ==
- King: Bhumibol Adulyadej
- Crown Prince: Vajiralongkorn
- Prime Minister: Yingluck Shinawatra
- Supreme Patriarch: Nyanasamvara Suvaddhana

== Events ==
=== March ===
- 2012 Southern Thailand bombings took place on March 31. It hit Yala, Yala Province and Hat Yai, Songkhla Province.

=== June ===
- Miss Universe Thailand 2012 took place on June 2. Nutpimon Natthayalak was the winner.

=== September ===
- 2012 PTT Thailand Open took place from 22 to 30 September. Richard Gasquet was the winner of the singles tournament and Lu Yen-hsun and Danai Udomchoke were the winners of the doubles tournament

=== October ===
- On October 20, Grand Sport Group became Thailand national football team's kit supplier and sponsor.

== See also ==
- 2012 Thai Premier League
- 2012 Thai Division 1 League
- 2012 AFC U-16 Championship
- Thailand at the 2012 Summer Olympics
- Economy in Thailand recovery in 2012 and onwards
- 2012 in Thai television
- List of Thai films of 2012
