= March 22 =

March 22 this year in various calendars
- Sunday, 22 March 2026
Akan	Kwakwasi
Armenian	5 Ahekani 1475
Aztec	Huei Tecuilhuitl 11, 7 Quiyahuitl
Babylonian	2 Adaru, 2336 SE
Balinese pawukon	Menga, Beteng, Jaya, Pon, Was, Redite of Dukut, Guru, Ogan, Suka
Bengali	8 Chaitro, BS 1432
Chinese	Yin Wood Goat・Hairy Head Mansion; Fire Horse Year, Month 2, Day 4 (Chunfen, 14 days until Qingming)
Common Era	22 March 2026 CE
Coptic	13 Paremhat, AM 1742
Egyptian	10 Mesori, 2774 NE
Ethiopian	13 Magābit, 2018 Amätä Məhrät
French Republican	Décade I, Duodi de Germinal de l'Année 234 de la République
Gregorian	22 March, AD 2026
Hebrew	4 Nisan, AM 5786
Hindu	Bharaṇī・Vaidhṛti; Solar: 9 Caitra, 1947 SE; Lunisolar: Caturthī, Śukla pakṣa of Caitra, 2083 VE; Rāudra・5126 KY・1,872,656
Icelandic	Sunnudagur, 29 Góa 2025
Islamic	3 Shawwal, AH 1447 (using tabular method)
ISO week date	2026-W12-7
Japanese	4 Kisaragi, Reiwa 8 (Shunbun, 14 days until Seimei)
Julian	9 March, AD 2026 (AM 7534)
Julian day	2461122
Korean	4 Tokkidal, 4359 DE
Maya	13.0.13.7.19; 17 Cumku, 7 Cauac
Roman	ante diem VII Idus Martias, MMDCCLXXIX AUC
Solar Hijri	2 Farvardin, SH 1405
Tibetan	4 dbo, me pho rta 2153 or 1772 or 1000

<<	March					>>
Su	Mo	Tu	We	Th	Fr	Sa
1	2	3	4	5	6	7
8	9	10	11	12	13	14
15	16	17	18	19	20	21
22	23	24	25	26	27	28
29	30	31
2026

March 22 in recent years
2026 (Sunday)
2025 (Saturday)
2024 (Friday)
2023 (Wednesday)
2022 (Tuesday)
2021 (Monday)
2020 (Sunday)
2019 (Friday)
2018 (Thursday)
2017 (Wednesday)

March 22 is the 81st day of the year (82nd in leap years) in the Gregorian calendar; 284 days remain until the end of the year.

== Events ==
=== Pre-1600 ===
- 106 – Start of the Bostran era, the calendar of the province of Arabia Petraea.
- 235 – Roman emperor Severus Alexander is murdered, marking the start of the Crisis of the Third Century.
- 871 – Æthelred of Wessex is defeated by a Danish invasion army at the Battle of Marton.
- 1185 – Battle of Yashima: the Japanese forces of the Taira clan are defeated by the Minamoto clan.
- 1312 – Vox in excelso: Pope Clement V dissolves the Order of the Knights Templar.
- 1508 – Ferdinand II of Aragon commissions Amerigo Vespucci chief navigator of the Spanish Empire.

=== 1601–1900 ===
- 1621 – The Pilgrims of Plymouth Colony, led by governor John Carver, sign a peace treaty with Massasoit, sachem of the Wampanoags; Squanto serves as an interpreter between the two sides.
- 1622 – Jamestown massacre: Algonquians kill 347 English settlers around Jamestown, Virginia, a third of the colony's population, during the Second Anglo-Powhatan War.
- 1631 – The Massachusetts Bay Colony outlaws the possession of cards, dice, and gaming tables.
- 1638 – Anne Hutchinson is expelled from Massachusetts Bay Colony for religious dissent.
- 1668 – Notable Privateer Henry Morgan lands in Cuba to raid and plunder the inland town of Puerto del Príncipe during the latter stages of the Anglo-Spanish War (1654–1660).
- 1739 – Nader Shah occupies Delhi in India and sacks the city, stealing the jewels of the Peacock Throne.
- 1765 – The British Parliament passes the Stamp Act that introduces a tax to be levied directly on its American colonies.
- 1784 – The Emerald Buddha is moved with great ceremony to its current location in Wat Phra Kaew, Thailand.
- 1792 – Battle of Croix-des-Bouquets: Black slave insurgents gain a victory in the first major battle of the Haitian Revolution.
- 1794 – The Slave Trade Act of 1794 bans the export of slaves from the United States, and prohibits American citizens from outfitting a ship for the purpose of importing slaves.
- 1829 – In the London Protocol, the three protecting powers (United Kingdom, France and Russia) establish the borders of Greece.
- 1849 – The Austrians defeat the Piedmontese at the Battle of Novara.
- 1871 – In North Carolina, William Woods Holden becomes the first governor of a U.S. state to be removed from office by impeachment.
- 1873 – The Spanish National Assembly abolishes slavery in Puerto Rico.
- 1894 – The Stanley Cup ice hockey competition is held for the first time, in Montreal, Canada.
- 1895 – Before the Société pour L'Encouragement à l'Industrie, brothers Auguste and Louis Lumière demonstrate movie film technology publicly for the first time.
- 1896 – Charilaos Vasilakos wins the first modern Olympic marathon race with a time of three hours and 18 minutes.

=== 1901–present ===
- 1906 – The first England vs France rugby union match is played at Parc des Princes in Paris.
- 1913 – Mystic Phan Xích Long, the self-proclaimed Emperor of Vietnam, is arrested for organising a revolt against the colonial rule of French Indochina, which was nevertheless carried out by his supporters the following day.
- 1916 – Yuan Shikai abdicates as Emperor of China, restoring the Republic and returning to the Presidency.
- 1920 – Azeri and Turkish army soldiers with participation of Kurdish gangs attack the Armenian inhabitants of Shushi (Nagorno Karabakh).
- 1933 – Cullen–Harrison Act: President Franklin D. Roosevelt signs an amendment to the Volstead Act, legalizing the manufacture and sale of "3.2 beer" (3.2% alcohol by weight, approximately 4% alcohol by volume) and light wines.
- 1933 – Nazi Germany opens its first concentration camp, Dachau.
- 1934 – The first Masters Tournament is held at Augusta National Golf Club in Georgia.
- 1939 – Germany takes Memel from Lithuania.
- 1942 – World War II: In the Mediterranean Sea, the Royal Navy confronts Italy's Regia Marina in the Second Battle of Sirte.
- 1943 – World War II: The entire village of Khatyn (in present-day Republic of Belarus) is burnt alive by Schutzmannschaft Battalion 118.
- 1945 – World War II: The city of Hildesheim, Germany, is heavily damaged in a British air raid, though it had little military significance and Germany was on the verge of final defeat.
- 1945 – The Arab League is founded when a charter is adopted in Cairo, Egypt.
- 1946 – The United Kingdom grants full independence to Transjordan.
- 1955 – A United States Navy Douglas R6D-1 Liftmaster crashes into Hawaii's Waiʻanae Range, killing 66.
- 1957 – A United States Air Force aircraft disappears with all 67 people on board somewhere over the Pacific Ocean.
- 1960 – Arthur Leonard Schawlow and Charles H. Townes receive the first patent for a laser.
- 1963 – The Beatles release their debut album Please Please Me.
- 1972 – The United States Congress sends the Equal Rights Amendment to the states for ratification.
- 1972 – In Eisenstadt v. Baird, the United States Supreme Court decides that unmarried persons have the right to possess contraceptives.
- 1975 – A fire at the Browns Ferry Nuclear Power Plant in Decatur, Alabama, causes a dangerous reduction in cooling water levels.
- 1978 – Karl Wallenda of The Flying Wallendas dies after falling off a tight-rope suspended between two hotels in San Juan, Puerto Rico.
- 1982 – NASA's Space Shuttle Columbia is launched from the Kennedy Space Center on its third mission, STS-3.
- 1988 – The United States Congress votes to override President Ronald Reagan's veto of the Civil Rights Restoration Act of 1987.
- 1992 – USAir Flight 405 crashes shortly after takeoff from New York City's LaGuardia Airport, leading to a number of studies into the effect that ice has on aircraft.
- 1992 – Fall of communism in Albania: The Democratic Party of Albania wins a decisive majority in the parliamentary election.
- 1993 – The Intel Corporation ships the first Pentium chips (80586), featuring a 60 MHz clock speed, 100+ MIPS, and a 64 bit data path.
- 1995 – Cosmonaut Valeri Polyakov returns to earth after setting a record of 438 days in space.
- 1996 – NASA's Space Shuttle Atlantis is launched on its 16th mission, STS-76.
- 1997 – Tara Lipinski, aged 14 years and nine months, becomes the youngest women's World Figure Skating Champion.
- 1997 – Comet Hale–Bopp reaches its closest approach to Earth at 1.315 AU.
- 2004 – Ahmed Yassin, co-founder and leader of the Palestinian Sunni Islamist group Hamas, two bodyguards, and nine civilian bystanders are killed in the Gaza Strip when hit by Israeli Air Force Hellfire missiles.
- 2006 – Three Christian Peacemaker Team (CPT) hostages are freed by British forces in Baghdad after 118 days of captivity and the murder of their colleague from the U.S., Tom Fox.
- 2013 – At least 37 people are killed and 200 are injured after a fire destroys a camp containing Burmese refugees near Ban Mae, Thailand.
- 2016 – Three suicide bombers kill 32 people and injure 316 in the 2016 Brussels bombings at the airport and at the Maelbeek/Maalbeek metro station.
- 2017 – A terrorist attack in London near the Houses of Parliament leaves four people dead and at least 20 injured.
- 2017 – Syrian civil war: Five hundred members of the Syrian Democratic Forces (SDF) are airlifted south of the Euphrates by United States Air Force helicopters, beginning the Battle of Tabqa.
- 2019 – The Special Counsel investigation on the 2016 United States presidential election concludes when Robert Mueller submits his report to the United States Attorney General.
- 2019 – Two buses crash in Kitampo, a town north of Ghana's capital Accra, killing at least 50 people.
- 2020 – Indian Prime Minister Narendra Modi announces the country's largest ever self-imposed curfew, in an effort to fight the spread of COVID-19.
- 2020 – Greek Prime Minister Kyriakos Mitsotakis announces a national lockdown and the country's first ever self-imposed curfew, in an effort to fight the spread of COVID-19.
- 2021 – Ten people are killed in a mass shooting in Boulder, Colorado.
- 2024 – At least 151 people are killed and 609 injured in a bombing and mass shooting at the Crocus City Hall in Krasnogorsk, Russia.
- 2026 – Air Canada Express Flight 8646, a Bombardier CRJ-900 operated by Jazz Aviation, collided with a fire truck while landing at LaGuardia Airport in New York City. Two fatalities were reported, both being the captain and the co-pilot. This marked the first fatal accident involving a CRJ-900.

== Births ==
=== Pre-1600 ===
- 841 – Bernard Plantapilosa, Frankish son of Bernard of Septimania (died 885)
- 875 – William I, Duke of Aquitaine (died 918)
- 1212 – Emperor Go-Horikawa of Japan (died 1235)
- 1367 – Thomas de Mowbray, 1st Duke of Norfolk, English politician, Earl Marshal (probable); (died 1399)
- 1394 – Ulugh Beg, Persian astronomer and mathematician (died 1449)
- 1459 – Maximilian I, Holy Roman Emperor (died 1519)
- 1499 – Johann Carion, German astrologer and chronicler (died 1537)
- 1503 – Antonio Francesco Grazzini, Italian author and educator (died 1583)
- 1517 – Gioseffo Zarlino, Italian composer (died 1590)
- 1519 – Catherine Brandon, Duchess of Suffolk, English noblewoman (died 1580)
- 1582 – John Williams, Archbishop of York (died 1650)
- 1599 – Anthony van Dyck, Flemish-English painter and etcher (died 1641)

=== 1601–1900 ===
- 1609 – John II Casimir Vasa, Polish king (died 1672)
- 1615 – Katherine Jones, Viscountess Ranelagh, British scientist (died 1691)
- 1663 – August Hermann Francke, German clergyman, philanthropist, and scholar (died 1727)
- 1684 – William Pulteney, 1st Earl of Bath, English politician, Secretary at War (died 1764)
- 1712 – Edward Moore, English poet and playwright (died 1757)
- 1720 – Nicolas-Henri Jardin, French architect, designed the Yellow Palace and Bernstorff Palace (died 1799)
- 1723 – Charles Carroll, American lawyer and politician (died 1783)
- 1728 – Anton Raphael Mengs, German painter and theorist (died 1779)
- 1785 – Adam Sedgwick, English scientist (died 1873)
- 1797 – William I, German Emperor (died 1888)
- 1808 – Caroline Norton, English feminist, social reformer, and author (died 1877)
- 1808 – David Swinson Maynard, American physician and lawyer (died 1873)
- 1812 – Stephen Pearl Andrews, American author and activist (died 1886)
- 1814 – Thomas Crawford, American sculptor, designed the Statue of Freedom (died 1857)
- 1817 – Braxton Bragg, American general (died 1876)
- 1818 – John Ainsworth Horrocks, English-Australian explorer, founded Penwortham (died 1846)
- 1822 – Ahmed Cevdet Pasha, Ottoman sociologist, historian, scholar, statesman and jurist (died 1895)
- 1841 – Anastassios Christomanos, Greek scientist (died 1906)
- 1842 – Mykola Lysenko, Ukrainian pianist, composer, and conductor (died 1912)
- 1846 – Randolph Caldecott, English illustrator and painter (died 1886)
- 1846 – James Timberlake, American lieutenant, police officer, and farmer (died 1891)
- 1852 – Otakar Ševčík, Czech violinist and educator (died 1934)
- 1852 – Hector Sévin, French cardinal (died 1916)
- 1855 – Dorothy Tennant, British painter (died 1926)
- 1857 – Paul Doumer, French mathematician, journalist, and politician, 14th President of France (died 1932)
- 1866 – Jack Boyle, American baseball player and umpire (died 1913)
- 1868 – Robert Andrews Millikan, American colonel and physicist, Nobel Prize laureate (died 1953)
- 1869 – Emilio Aguinaldo, Filipino general and politician, 1st President of the Philippines (died 1964)
- 1869 – Tom McInnes, Scottish-English footballer (died 1939)
- 1873 – Ernest Lawson, Canadian-American painter (died 1939)
- 1880 – Ernest C. Quigley, Canadian-American football player and coach (died 1960)
- 1884 – Arthur H. Vandenberg, American journalist and politician (died 1951)
- 1884 – Lyda Borelli, Italian actress (died 1959)
- 1885 – Aryeh Levin, Polish-Lithuanian rabbi and educator (died 1969)
- 1886 – August Rei, Estonian lawyer and politician, Head of State of Estonia (died 1963)
- 1887 – Chico Marx, American actor (died 1961)
- 1890 – George Clark, American race car driver (died 1978)
- 1892 – Charlie Poole, American country banjo player (died 1931)
- 1892 – Johannes Semper, Estonian poet and scholar (died 1970)
- 1896 – He Long, Chinese general and politician, 1st Vice Premier of the People's Republic of China (died 1969)
- 1896 – Joseph Schildkraut, Austrian-American actor (died 1964)
- 1899 – Ruth Page, American ballerina and choreographer (died 1991)

=== 1901–present ===
- 1901 – Greta Kempton, Austrian-American painter (died 1991)
- 1902 – Johannes Brinkman, Dutch architect, designed the Van Nelle Factory (died 1949)
- 1902 – Madeleine Milhaud, French actress and composer (died 2008)
- 1903 – Bill Holman, American cartoonist (died 1987)
- 1907 – James M. Gavin, American general and diplomat, United States Ambassador to France (died 1990)
- 1908 – Jack Crawford, Australian tennis player (died 1991)
- 1909 – Gabrielle Roy, Canadian author and educator (died 1983)
- 1910 – Nicholas Monsarrat, English sailor and author (died 1979)
- 1912 – Wilfrid Brambell, Irish actor and performer (died 1985)
- 1912 – Leslie Johnson, English race car driver (died 1959)
- 1912 – Agnes Martin, Canadian-American painter and educator (died 2004)
- 1913 – Tom McCall, American journalist and politician, 30th Governor of Oregon (died 1983)
- 1913 – Lew Wasserman, American businessman and talent agent (died 2002)
- 1913 – James Westerfield, American actor (died 1971)
- 1914 – John Stanley, American author and illustrator (died 1993)
- 1914 – Donald Stokes, Baron Stokes, English businessman (died 2008)
- 1915 – Dorothy Burnham, American civil rights activist and educator
- 1917 – Virginia Grey, American actress (died 2004)
- 1917 – Irving Kaplansky, Canadian-American mathematician and academic (died 2006)
- 1917 – Paul Rogers, English actor (died 2013)
- 1918 – Cheddi Jagan, Guyanese politician, 4th President of Guyana (died 1997)
- 1919 – Bernard Krigstein, American illustrator (died 1990)
- 1920 – James Brown, American actor (died 1992)
- 1920 – Werner Klemperer, German-American actor (died 2000)
- 1920 – Lloyd MacPhail, Canadian businessman and politician, 23rd Lieutenant Governor of Prince Edward Island (died 1995)
- 1920 – Ross Martin, American actor (died 1981)
- 1920 – Katsuko Saruhashi, Japanese geochemist (died 2007)
- 1920 – Fanny Waterman, English pianist and educator, founded the Leeds International Pianoforte Competition (died 2020)
- 1921 – Nino Manfredi, Italian actor, director, and screenwriter (died 2004)
- 1922 – John J. Gilligan, American politician, 62nd Governor of Ohio (died 2013)
- 1922 – Stewart Stern, American screenwriter (died 2015)
- 1924 – Yevgeny Ostashev, Russian test pilot, participant in the launch of the first artificial Earth satellite (died 1960)
- 1924 – Osman F. Seden, Turkish director, producer, and screenwriter (died 1998)
- 1924 – Bill Wendell, American television announcer (died 1999)
- 1927 – Marty Blake, American basketball player and manager (died 2013)
- 1927 – Nicolas Tikhomiroff, Russian photographer (died 2016)
- 1928 – Carrie Donovan, American journalist (died 2001)
- 1928 – E. D. Hirsch, American author, critic, and academic
- 1928 – Ed Macauley, American basketball player, coach, and priest (died 2011)
- 1929 – P. Ramlee, Malaysian actor, director, singer, songwriter, composer, and producer (died 1973)
- 1930 – Derek Bok, American lawyer and academic
- 1931 – Burton Richter, American physicist and academic, Nobel Prize laureate (died 2018)
- 1931 – William Shatner, Canadian actor
- 1931 – Ann Shulgin, psychedelic researcher and author (died 2022)
- 1931 – Leslie Thomas, Welsh journalist and author (died 2014)
- 1932 – Els Borst, Dutch physician and politician, Deputy Prime Minister of the Netherlands (died 2014)
- 1932 – Larry Evans, American chess player and journalist (died 2010)
- 1933 – Abolhassan Banisadr, Iranian economist and politician, 1st President of Iran (died 2021)
- 1934 – May Britt, Swedish actress (died 2025)
- 1934 – Sheila Cameron, English lawyer and judge (died 2025)
- 1935 – Galina Korchuganova, Russian-born Soviet test pilot and aerobatics champion (died 2004)
- 1935 – Lea Pericoli, Italian tennis player and journalist (died 2024)
- 1935 – Frank Pulli, American baseball player and umpire (died 2013)
- 1935 – M. Emmet Walsh, American actor (died 2024)
- 1936 – Erol Büyükburç, Turkish singer-songwriter, pop music composer, and actor (died 2015)
- 1936 – Ron Carey, American trade union leader (died 2008)
- 1936 – Roger Whittaker, Kenyan-English singer-songwriter and guitarist (died 2023)
- 1937 – Angelo Badalamenti, American pianist and composer (died 2022)
- 1937 – Armin Hary, German sprinter
- 1937 – Jon Hassell, American trumpet player and composer (died 2021)
- 1937 – Foo Foo Lammar, British drag queen (died 2003)
- 1938 – Rein Etruk, Estonian chess player (died 2012)
- 1940 – George Edward Alcorn Jr., American physicist and inventor
- 1940 – Dave Keon, Canadian ice hockey player
- 1940 – Haing S. Ngor, Cambodian-American actor and physician (died 1996)
- 1941 – Jeremy Clyde, English actor and musician
- 1941 – Billy Collins, American poet
- 1941 – Bruno Ganz, Swiss actor (died 2019)
- 1941 – Cassam Uteem, Mauritian politician, 2nd President of Mauritius
- 1942 – Jorge Ben Jor, Brazilian singer-songwriter
- 1942 – Dick Pound, Canadian lawyer and academic
- 1943 – George Benson, American singer-songwriter and guitarist
- 1943 – Nazem Ganjapour, Iranian footballer and manager (died 2013)
- 1943 – Keith Relf, English singer-songwriter, guitarist, and producer (died 1976)
- 1945 – Eric Roth, American screenwriter and producer
- 1946 – Don Chaney, American basketball player and coach
- 1946 – Rivka Golani, Israeli viola player and composer
- 1946 – Rudy Rucker, American mathematician, computer scientist, and author
- 1946 – Harry Vanda, Dutch-Australian singer-songwriter, guitarist, and producer
- 1947 – George Ferguson, English architect and politician, 1st Mayor of Bristol
- 1947 – Maarten van Gent, Dutch basketball player and coach
- 1948 – Wolf Blitzer, American journalist
- 1948 – Andrew Lloyd Webber, English composer and director
- 1949 – Fanny Ardant, French actress
- 1949 – Brian Hanrahan, English journalist (died 2010)
- 1952 – Des Browne, Scottish lawyer and politician, Secretary of State for Scotland
- 1952 – Bob Costas, American sportscaster
- 1953 – Kenneth Rogoff, American economist and chess grandmaster
- 1955 – James House, American singer-songwriter
- 1955 – Valdis Zatlers, Latvian physician and politician, 7th President of Latvia
- 1956 – Maria Teresa, Grand Duchess of Luxembourg
- 1957 – Jürgen Bucher, German footballer
- 1957 – Stephanie Mills, American singer-songwriter
- 1960 – Jim Covert, American football player
- 1961 – Simon Furman, British comic book writer
- 1962 – Nikos Kourbanas, Greek footballer
- 1963 – Deborah Bull, English ballerina
- 1963 – Pelle Eklund, Swedish ice hockey player
- 1963 – Susan Ann Sulley, English pop singer
- 1963 – Hannu Virta, Finnish ice hockey player and coach
- 1963 – Martín Vizcarra, Peruvian engineer and politician, 67th President of Peru
- 1965 – Ice MC, British rapper
- 1966 – Todd Ewen, Canadian ice hockey player and coach (died 2015)
- 1966 – Artis Pabriks, Latvian academic and politician, 11th Minister for Defence of Latvia
- 1966 – António Pinto, Portuguese runner
- 1966 – Brian Shaw, American basketball player and coach
- 1967 – Mario Cipollini, Italian cyclist
- 1967 – Bernie Gallacher, Scottish-English footballer (died 2011)
- 1969 – Russell Maryland, American football player
- 1970 – Andreas Johnson, Swedish singer-songwriter
- 1970 – Leontien van Moorsel, Dutch cyclist
- 1970 – Hwang Young-cho, South Korean runner
- 1971 – Will Yun Lee, American actor
- 1972 – Shawn Bradley, German-American basketball player, coach, and actor
- 1972 – Cory Lidle, American baseball player (died 2006)
- 1973 – Beverley Knight, English singer-songwriter and producer
- 1974 – Marcus Camby, American basketball player
- 1974 – Philippe Clement, Belgian footballer
- 1974 – Grigoria Golia, Greek handball player
- 1974 – Tuomas Grönman, Finnish ice hockey player
- 1974 – Geo Meneses, Mexican producer and singer
- 1975 – Guillermo Díaz, American actor
- 1975 – Anne Dudek, American actress
- 1975 – Cole Hauser, American actor
- 1975 – Jiří Novák, Czech-Monegasque tennis player
- 1976 – Anna Iberszer, Polish actress, dancer, and choreographer
- 1976 – Teun de Nooijer, Dutch field hockey player
- 1976 – Asako Toki, Japanese singer-songwriter
- 1976 – Reese Witherspoon, American actress
- 1977 – John Otto, American musician
- 1977 – Joey Porter, American football player and coach
- 1977 – Dave Portnoy, American businessman and social media personality
- 1977 – Tom Poti, American ice hockey player
- 1977 – Anabel Rodríguez Ríos, Venezuelan film director and screenwriter
- 1978 – Josh Heupel, American football player and coach
- 1979 – Michalis Kouinelis, Greek hip hop singer
- 1979 – Aaron North, American guitarist
- 1979 – Juan Uribe, Dominican baseball player
- 1981 – Arne Gabius, German runner
- 1981 – Mims, American rapper
- 1982 – Deng Gai, South Sudanese basketball player
- 1982 – Enrico Gasparotto, Italian cyclist
- 1982 – Michael Janyk, Canadian skier
- 1982 – Michael Morse, American baseball player
- 1982 – Piá, Brazilian footballer
- 1982 – Mike Smith, Canadian ice hockey player
- 1982 – Constance Wu, American actress
- 1983 – Thomas Davis Sr., American football player
- 1984 – Piotr Trochowski, German footballer
- 1985 – Mayola Biboko, Belgian footballer
- 1985 – Jakob Fuglsang, Danish cyclist
- 1985 – Justin Masterson, American baseball player
- 1985 – Kelli Waite, Australian swimmer
- 1986 – Dexter Fowler, American baseball player
- 1987 – Ike Davis, American baseball player
- 1987 – Liam Doran, British rallycross driver
- 1987 – Jairo Mora Sandoval, Costa Rican environmentalist (died 2013)
- 1988 – Chris Ivory, American football player
- 1989 – Ruben Popa, Romanian footballer
- 1989 – J. J. Watt, American football player
- 1992 – Roston Chase, Barbadian cricketer
- 1992 – Edy Tavares, Cape Verdean basketball player
- 1994 – Dax, Canadian rapper and singer
- 1994 – Edwin Díaz, Puerto Rican baseball player
- 1994 – Taurean Prince, American basketball player
- 1994 – Aliaksandra Sasnovich, Belarusian tennis player
- 1994 – Ha Sung-woon, South Korean singer
- 1997 – Alex Meret, Italian footballer
- 1997 – Chimezie Metu, Nigerian-American basketball player
- 1997 – Martin Wong, Hong Kong model and actor
- 1998 – Noah Lalonde, American actor
- 1999 – Mick Schumacher, German racing driver
- 2000 – Dimitrios Meliopoulos, Greek footballer
- 2001 – Artūrs Šilovs, Latvian ice hockey player

== Deaths ==
=== Pre-1600 ===
- 235 – Severus Alexander, Roman emperor (born 208)
- 880 – Carloman of Bavaria, Frankish king
- 1144 – William of Norwich, child murder victim
- 1322 – Thomas, 2nd Earl of Lancaster, English politician, Lord High Steward of England (born 1278)
- 1418 – Dietrich of Nieheim, German bishop and historian (born 1345)
- 1421 – Thomas of Lancaster, 1st Duke of Clarence, English soldier and politician, Lord High Steward of England (born 1388)
- 1454 – John Kemp, Archbishop of Canterbury
- 1471 – George of Poděbrady (born 1420)

=== 1601–1900 ===
- 1544 – Johannes Magnus, Swedish archbishop and theologian (born 1488)
- 1602 – Agostino Carracci, Italian painter and educator (born 1557)
- 1685 – Emperor Go-Sai of Japan (born 1638)
- 1687 – Jean-Baptiste Lully, Italian-French composer and conductor (born 1632)
- 1758 – Jonathan Edwards, English minister, theologian, and philosopher (born 1703)
- 1820 – Stephen Decatur, American commander (born 1779)
- 1832 – Johann Wolfgang von Goethe, German novelist, poet, playwright, and diplomat (born 1749)
- 1840 – Étienne Bobillier, French mathematician and academic (born 1798)
- 1864 – Konstanty Kalinowski, writer, journalist, lawyer and revolutionary (born 1838)
- 1881 – Samuel Courtauld, English businessman (born 1793)
- 1896 – Thomas Hughes, English lawyer and politician (born 1822)

=== 1901–present ===
- 1913 – Song Jiaoren, Chinese educator and politician (born 1882)
- 1913 – Ruggero Oddi, Italian physiologist and anatomist (born 1864)
- 1924 – William Macewen, Scottish surgeon and neuroscientist (born 1848)
- 1931 – James Campbell, 1st Baron Glenavy, Irish lawyer and politician (born 1851)
- 1942 – Frederick Cuming, English cricketer (born 1875)
- 1942 – William Donne, English captain and cricketer (born 1875)
- 1942 – María Collazo, Uruguayan journalist and activist (born 1884)
- 1952 – D. S. Senanayake, 1st Prime Minister of Sri Lanka (born 1883)
- 1955 – Ivan Šubašić, Croatian lawyer and politician, 23rd Prime Minister of Yugoslavia (born 1892)
- 1958 – Mike Todd, American film producer (born 1909)
- 1960 – José Antonio Aguirre, Spanish lawyer and politician, 1st President of the Basque Country (born 1904)
- 1966 – John Harlin, American mountaineer and pilot (born 1935)
- 1971 – Johannes Villemson, Estonian-American runner (born 1893)
- 1971 – Nella Walker, American actress and vaudevillian (born 1886)
- 1974 – Peter Revson, American race car driver (born 1939)
- 1974 – Orazio Satta Puliga, Italian automobile designer (born 1910)
- 1976 – John Dwyer McLaughlin, American painter (born 1898)
- 1977 – A. K. Gopalan, Indian educator and politician (born 1904)
- 1978 – Karl Wallenda, German-American acrobat and tightrope walker, founded The Flying Wallendas (born 1905)
- 1979 – Ben Lyon, American actor and studio executive (born 1901)
- 1981 – James Elliott, American runner and coach (born 1915)
- 1981 – Gil Puyat, Filipino businessman and politician, 13th President of the Senate of the Philippines (born 1907)
- 1985 – Raoul Ubac, French painter, sculptor, photographer, and engraver (born 1910)
- 1985 – Spyros Vassiliou, Greek painter, printmaker, illustrator, and stage designer (born 1903)
- 1986 – Olive Deering, American actress (born 1918)
- 1987 – Odysseas Angelis, Greek general and politician (born 1912)
- 1989 – Peta Taylor, English cricketer (born 1912)
- 1990 – Gerald Bull, Canadian engineer and academic (born 1928)
- 1991 – Léon Balcer, Canadian lawyer and politician, 19th Solicitor General of Canada (born 1917)
- 1991 – Paul Engle, American novelist, poet, playwright, and critic (born 1908)
- 1991 – Dave Guard, American singer-songwriter and guitarist (born 1934)
- 1991 – Gloria Holden, English-American actress (born 1908)
- 1993 – Steve Olin, American baseball player (born 1965)
- 1994 – Dan Hartman, American singer-songwriter, and producer (born 1950)
- 1994 – Walter Lantz, American animator, director, and producer (born 1899)
- 1996 – Don Murray, American drummer (born 1945)
- 1996 – Robert F. Overmyer, American colonel, pilot, and astronaut (born 1936)
- 1996 – Billy Williamson, American guitarist (born 1925)
- 1999 – Max Beloff, Baron Beloff, English historian and academic (born 1913)
- 1999 – David Strickland, American actor (born 1969)
- 2000 – Carlo Parola, Italian footballer and manager (born 1921)
- 2001 – Stepas Butautas, Lithuanian basketball player and coach (born 1925)
- 2001 – Sabiha Gökçen, Turkish soldier and pilot (born 1913)
- 2001 – William Hanna, American animator, director, producer, and voice actor, co-founded Hanna-Barbera (born 1910)
- 2001 – Robert Fletcher Shaw, Canadian businessman, academic, and civil servant (born 1910)
- 2002 – Rudolf Baumgartner, Swiss violinist and conductor (born 1917)
- 2003 – Terry Lloyd, English journalist (born 1952)
- 2004 – Janet Akyüz Mattei, Turkish-American astronomer and academic (born 1943)
- 2004 – Ahmed Yassin, Co-founded Hamas (born 1937)
- 2004 – V. M. Tarkunde, Indian lawyer and civil rights activist (born 1909)
- 2005 – Rod Price, English guitarist and songwriter (born 1947)
- 2005 – Gemini Ganesan, Indian film actor (born 1920)
- 2005 – Kenzō Tange, Japanese architect, designed the Yoyogi National Gymnasium and Hiroshima Peace Memorial Museum (born 1913)
- 2006 – Pierre Clostermann, French soldier, pilot, and politician (born 1921)
- 2006 – Pío Leyva, Cuban singer and author (born 1917)
- 2006 – Kurt von Trojan, Austrian-Australian journalist and author (born 1937)
- 2007 – U. G. Krishnamurti, Indian-Italian philosopher and educator (born 1918)
- 2008 – Cachao López, Cuban-American bassist and composer (born 1918)
- 2010 – James Black, Scottish biologist and pharmacologist, Nobel Prize laureate (born 1924)
- 2010 – Özhan Canaydın, Turkish basketball player and businessman (born 1943)
- 2011 – Artur Agostinho, Portuguese journalist (born 1920)
- 2011 – Victor Bouchard, Canadian pianist and composer (born 1926)
- 2012 – Joe Blanchard, American football player and wrestler (born 1928)
- 2012 – David Waltz, American computer scientist and academic (born 1943)
- 2012 – Neil L. Whitehead, English anthropologist and author (born 1956)
- 2013 – Vladimír Čech, Czech actor and politician (born 1951)
- 2013 – Bebo Valdés, Cuban-Swedish pianist and composer (born 1918)
- 2014 – Yashwant Vithoba Chittal, Indian author (born 1928)
- 2014 – Mickey Duff, Polish-English boxer and manager (born 1929)
- 2014 – Thor Listau, Norwegian soldier and politician (born 1938)
- 2014 – Tasos Mitsopoulos, Cypriot politician, Cypriot Minister of Defence (born 1965)
- 2015 – Arkady Arkanov, Ukrainian-Russian actor and playwright (born 1933)
- 2015 – Horst Buhtz, German footballer and manager (born 1923)
- 2015 – Norman Scribner, American pianist, composer, and conductor (born 1936)
- 2016 – Rob Ford, Canadian businessman and politician, 64th Mayor of Toronto (born 1969)
- 2016 – Rita Gam, American actress (born 1927)
- 2018 – Johan van Hulst, Dutch politician, academic and author, Yad Vashem recipient (born 1911)
- 2019 – Scott Walker, British-American singer-songwriter (born 1943)
- 2024 – Laurent de Brunhoff, French author and illustrator (born 1925)
- 2025 – Jessica Aber, American lawyer (born 1981)
- 2025 – Andy Peebles, English radio DJ, television presenter and cricket commentator (born 1948)
- 2026 – Lionel Jospin, French civil servant and politician, 165th Prime Minister of France (born 1937)

== Holidays and observances ==
- Bihar Day (Bihar, India)
- Christian feast day:
  - Basil of Ancyra
  - Blessed Clemens August Graf von Galen
  - Darerca of Ireland
  - Epaphroditus
  - Jonathan Edwards (Lutheranism)
  - Lea of Rome
  - Nicholas Owen
  - Paul of Narbonne
  - March 22 (Eastern Orthodox liturgics)
- Earliest day on which Easter Sunday can fall (last in 1818, will not happen again until 2285), while April 25 is the latest. (Christianity)
- Emancipation Day or Día de la Abolición de la Esclavitud (Puerto Rico)
- World Water Day (International)
