= 2015 in Thailand =

- Decades: 1990s; 2000s; 2010s; 2020s; 2030s
- See also: Other events of 2015; Timeline of Thai history

The year 2015 is the 234th year of the Rattanakosin Kingdom of Thailand. It was the 70th year in the reign of King Bhumibol Adulyadej (Rama IX), and is reckoned as year 2558 in the Buddhist Era.

== Incumbents ==
- King: Bhumibol Adulyadej
- Crown Prince: Vajiralongkorn
- Prime Minister: Prayut Chan-o-cha
- Supreme Patriarch: (vacant)

== Events ==
=== January ===
- January 6 - Thai police arrest Gurmeet Singh convicted of involvement in a bombing in Chandigarh that killed 18 people in 1996, including Beant Singh who was then chief minister of Punjab.
- January 9 - Former Prime Minister of Thailand Yingluck Shinawatra appears to face impeachment charges over a failed rice subsidy scheme.
- January 23 - Thailand's military-appointed legislature votes to impeach former Prime Minister Yingluck Shinawatra for her role in overseeing a government rice subsidy program that lost billions of dollars.

=== April ===
- April 2 - Thailand's junta escalates their control from martial law to absolute power.

=== May ===
- May 24 - 2015 Rohingya refugee crisis
  - Malaysian authorities find mass graves at the border with Thailand of the Rohingya refugees fleeing Burma.
- May 25 - 2015 Rohingya refugee crisis
  - Malaysia's discovery yesterday is said to have 139 graves with some of them containing more than one body.
- May 29 - 2015 Rohingya refugee crisis
  - Thailand will allow American authorities to identify boats that carry refugees from Burma and Bangladesh by using surveillance planes.

=== June ===
- June 2 - 2015 Rohingya refugee crisis
  - A Thai general is suspended after the police order his arrest on suspicion of human trafficking.

=== August ===
- August 17 - Bombing in Ratchaprasong, Bangkok, killing 19.

=== September ===
- September 7 - A bolide over Bangkok and other locations flared up for several seconds in early morning.

== Deaths ==
- 19 January – Arthit Kamlang-ek, 89, general
- 16 April – Attaphol Buspakom, 52, footballer
- 16 May – Luang Por Khun Parissuddho, 91, monk
- 4 June – Chalood Nimsamer, 86, artist

== See also ==
- 2015 in Thai television
- List of Thai films of 2015
