= 2017 in Thailand =

- Decades: 1990s; 2000s; 2010s; 2020s; 2030s
- See also: Other events of 2017; Timeline of Thai history

The year 2017 is the 236th year of the Rattanakosin Kingdom of Thailand. It was the 2nd year in the reign of King Vajiralongkorn (Rama X), and is reckoned as year 2560 in the Buddhist Era.

== Incumbents ==
- King: Vajiralongkorn
- Prime Minister: Prayut Chan-o-cha
- Supreme Patriarch:
  - starting 12 February : Ariyavongsagatanana VIII

== Events ==
=== January ===
- January 2 - A collision between a minivan and a pickup truck in the Ban Bueng District kills at least 25 people and injures 2 others. Authorities are investigating the cause of the accident.
- January 7 - At least 18 people are killed in flash flooding.
- January 14 - A fighter jet crashes at Hat Yai International Airport while performing a Children's Day air show. The pilot is killed.
- January 15 - The death toll for the floods in the south of Thailand rises to 40.
- January 23 – The death toll in the floods rises to at least 85 people, and the flood have affected an estimate of 1.7 million people.

=== February ===
- February 12 - King Vajiralongkorn founded the Phra Maha Muniwong (Amborn Ambaro) as the 20th Supreme Patriarch.
- February 28 - The Thai government fires the police general for "extremely evil" misconduct and interests threatening national security.

=== March ===
- March 17 - Killing of Chaiyaphum Pasae at a military checkpoint in Chiang Dao District of Chiang Mai Province by army soldiers.

=== April ===
- April 6 - Promulgation of the Constitution of the Kingdom of Thailand 2017.

=== October ===
- October 25–29 - The Royal Cremation of King Bhumibol Adulyadej (Rama IX).

== Deaths ==
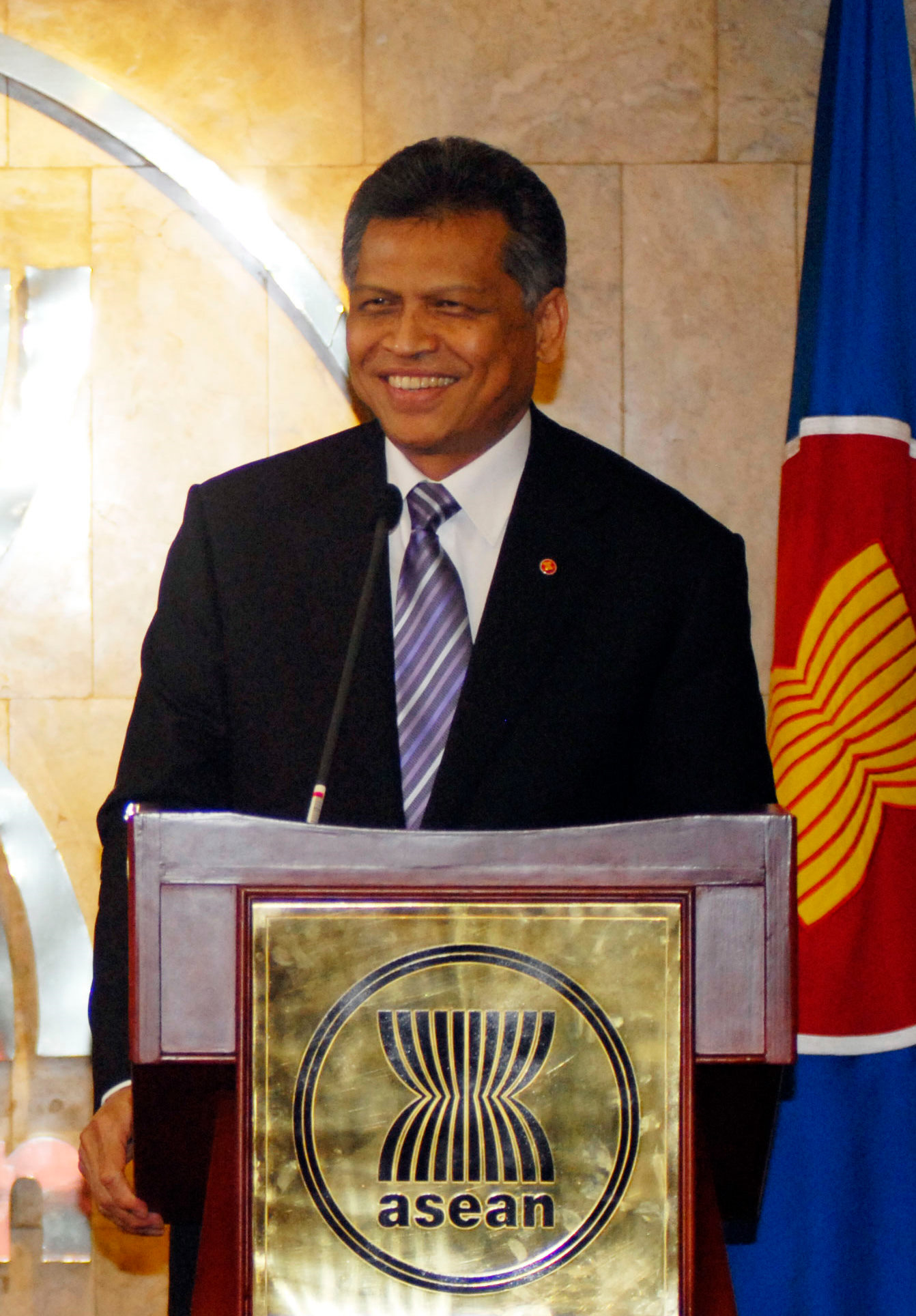
Surin Pitsuwan

- January 18 – Charnchai Likhitchittha, 36th President of the Supreme Court and 45th Minister of Justice (b.1946).
- January 20 – Professor Khramon Thongthamachad, 4th President of the Constitutional Court and 32nd Minister Attached to Office of the Prime Minister (b.1935).
- January 28 – Khwankhew Wascharothai, Former Deputy Lord Chamberlain (b.1928).
- February 7 – Nilawan Pintong, writer (b. 1915).
- February 17 – General Isarapong Noonpakdee, 32nd Minister of Justice and 28th Commander in Chief of the Royal Thai Army (b.1933).
- July 13 – Paritat Bulbon, racing driver (b. 1970).
- November 30 – Surin Pitsuwan, diplomat and politician, Minister of Foreign Affairs (1997–2001) and Secretary General of ASEAN (b. 1949).
- December 15 – George Yod Phimphisan, Roman Catholic prelate, Bishop of Udon Thani (b. 1933).

== See also ==
- 2017 in Thai television
- List of Thai films of 2017
