= 2016 in Thailand =

- Decades: 1990s; 2000s; 2010s; 2020s
- See also: Other events of 2016; Timeline of Thai history

The year 2016 is the 235th year of the Rattanakosin Kingdom of Thailand. It was the 71st and last year in the reign of King Bhumibol Adulyadej (Rama IX), and the first year in the reign of King Vajiralongkorn (Rama X). It is reckoned as year 2559 in the Buddhist Era.

== Incumbents ==
- King:
  - until 13 October : Bhumibol Adulyadej
  - starting 13 October : Vajiralongkorn
- Crown Prince:
  - until 13 October : Vajiralongkorn
- Prime Minister: Prayut Chan-o-cha
- Supreme Patriarch: (vacant)

== Events ==
=== January ===
- January 29 – the CC published drafting a new constitution and forwarded it to the NRC for approval.

=== June ===
- June 9 – 70th anniversary celebrations of Bhumibol Adulyadej's accession.

=== October ===
- October 13 – King Bhumibol Adulyadej dies at Siriraj Hospital in Bangkok the age of 88 after 70 years of reign. One year period of mourning was declared the following day. His only son, Crown Prince Maha Vajiralongkorn, became Thailand's new monarch.

== See also ==
- 2016 in Thai television
- List of Thai films of 2016
