= August 2016 Thailand bombings =

Terrorist attacks in Hua Hin, Surat Thani on 11 August 2016

- Part of the South Thailand Insurgency
- Location: Phuket, Trang, Hua Hin, Surat Thani
- Date: 11–12 August 2016
- Attack type: Bombings
- Deaths: 1 (11 August); 3 (12 August) Total: 4
- Injuries: 36
- Perpetrator: Muslim separatists (suspected)

On 11 August 2016, two bombs exploded in the Thai resort town of Hua Hin. One person was killed and 23, many of them tourists, were injured. The next day, several more bombings took place, again targeting Hua Hin as well as Surat Thani, Phuket and Trang. At least two people were killed and many more were injured. In total, at least four people were killed and 36 injured.

== 11 August ==
Two bombs exploded in Hua Hin at about 10:20 p.m. local time on 11 August. One Thai woman selling fruit on the street was killed and 23 people, including twelve foreigners, were injured. The injured include two English, two Dutch, one German and seven from Austria and Italy.

== 12 August ==
=== Hua Hin ===
Three more explosions occurred in Hua Hin on 12 August, killing one and injuring at least four others.

=== Surat Thani ===
A bomb that had been hidden in a flower pot exploded outside the Surat Thani police station and killed a municipal employee.

=== Phuket ===
Phuket Island was hit with two explosions on 12 August. The first occurred in the Loma Park, an area popular with tourists. The second occurred in Patong near a police station.

=== Trang ===
A bombing occurred in Trang, killing one person and injuring six others.

== Casualties ==
Casualties by nationality
Country	Deaths	Injured
Thailand	4	26
Italy		3
Netherlands		3
Germany		3
United Kingdom		2
Austria		1
Total	4	36

== Reaction ==
No group has claimed responsibility but authorities strongly suspect that Pattani separatists are behind the bombings.

On 12 August, the Prime Minister Prayut Chan-o-cha mentioned "bad people [that] have been acting since before the referendum." and "[w]e must not blame one another. We have never hurt or had conflicts with anyone, be it domestic or abroad."

Two suspects have been arrested in relation to the bombings with the Thai government stating their motive was "to create chaos and confusion".

== See also ==
- 2005 Songkhla bombings
- 2006 Hat Yai bombings
- 2007 South Thailand bombings
- 2012 Southern Thailand bombings
- 22 December 2013 South Thailand bombings
