= Bangkok Israeli embassy hostage crisis =

1972 Palestinian militant attack in Thailand

Israeli Bangkok embassy hostage crisis
- Location: 13.7428°N 100.5614°E; Bangkok, Thailand
- Date: 28 December 1972
- Target: Israeli embassy
- Attack type: Hostage taking
- Perpetrator: Black September

The Israeli Bangkok embassy hostage crisis occurred on 28 December 1972. It was a raid by a squad of four Palestinian militants, belonging to the Black September organization, on the Israeli embassy building in Bangkok in which the terrorists held six Israeli embassy staff hostage. After 19 hours of negotiations, the terrorists agreed to abandon the embassy in exchange for being flown to Egypt. The raid was one of a number of attacks that have been conducted against Israeli embassies and diplomats.

== Background ==
Vajiralongkorn, was to be proclaimed Crown Prince of Thailand on 28 December 1972.

== Attack ==
Two operatives from the Black September Organization, a Palestinian militant group, infiltrated a party at the Israeli Embassy in Bangkok. Once inside, two other operatives then climbed over the wall with automatic weapons, and the four took over the embassy. They allowed all the Thais to leave but held six Israelis hostages: Shimon Avimor, the visiting Israeli Ambassador to Cambodia, first secretary Nitzan Hadas, Hadas's wife Ruth, administration attache Pincus Lavie, Lavie's assistant Danie Beri, and Beri's wife. Rehavam Amir, the Israeli ambassador, and his wife Avital were attending the investiture ceremony of Vajiralongkorn at the Ananta Samakhom Throne Hall, thus they were not among the hostages and could therefore participate in the negotiations with the terrorists. Ambassador Amir and Prime Minister Thanom Kittikachorn were informed about the siege during a break in the middle of the ceremony.

The terrorists moved their hostages to the second floor of the three-storey building and made their demands. The terrorists demanded that 36 prisoners be released from Israeli prisons, including Kōzō Okamoto and the survivors of the Sabena Flight 571 incident. They threatened to blow up the embassy if these demands were not met by 08:00 on 29 December.

Two Thai government members, Dawee Chullasapya and Chatichai Choonhavan, who was then deputy foreign minister and became prime minister in 1988, along with the Egyptian ambassador to Thailand, Mustapha el Assawy, negotiated the release of the hostages and instead offered themselves and a number of other Thai officials as surety for the terrorists' safe conduct to Cairo.

After 19 hours of negotiation, an agreement, subsequently dubbed the "Bangkok solution", was worked out and no-one was injured.

Feeling that the Thai nation's celebration of the investiture of the heir to the throne should not be marred by a dispute that did not concern them, the Thai government guaranteed the terrorists safe travel to Cairo while leaving the hostages in the care of the Thais.

The Black September leadership was reportedly upset with the behavior of its operatives in settling the incident.

Then-Israeli prime minister Golda Meir praised the Thai government for their diplomacy which made for a bloodless end of the crisis.

== See also ==
- List of attacks against Israeli embassies and diplomats
