= Thailand's Got Talent season 2 =

Thailand's Got Talent
- Season 2
- Hosted by: Krit SriBhumisret; Kathsepsawad Ayuthaya
- Judges: Pinyo Ruedhamma; Pornchita na Songkhla; Jirayut Wattanasin
- Winner: Leng Rachanikorn Keawdee
- Runner-up: Gail Sophicha Aungkavimongkol

Release
- Original network: THAITV CH3
- Original release: 3 June – 2 September 2012

Season chronology
- ← Previous; Season 1

The second season of Thailand's Got Talent, a reality television series produced by Workpoint and premiered on May 14, 2012. This season is the first season without judge Nirut Sirijanya who was replaced with radio personality Jirayut Watthanasin. It is a talent show that features singers, dancers, sketch artists, comedians and other performers of all ages competing for the advertised top prize of 10,000,000 Baht (approximately $325,000).

== Preliminary auditions ==
Producers' auditions were held in Khon Kaen, Chiang Mai, Bangkok, and Songkhla.

Cities where theater auditions were held.

Audition city	Audition Date	Venue
Khon Kaen	February 5, 2012	Jareon Thani Hotel
Chiang Mai	February 11–12, 2012	Kad Suan Keaw Hall
Bangkok	February 17–19, 2012	MCC Hall, The Mall Bang Kapi
Songkhla	February 25–26, 2012	International Conference Centre

== Controversies ==
=== 'Boobs painting' ===
The show is infamous for its fraud. One of the most controversial cases is that of a 23-year-old woman, Duangjai Jansaunoi (Thai: ดวงใจ จันทร์เสือน้อย; RTGS: Duangchai Chansuea-noi), who unclothed herself before smearing herself in paint and gyrating against a canvas to dance music, shocking the three judges and the audience and bringing about negative criticism amongst the public. Also disputable was the two male judges who voted 'yes', saying it was an 'art'. The other judge, who is the only female, voted 'no', stating that "How can this be taken as an art? Anyone can do it. It is a kind of boldness, not a talent."

Thai minister of culture, Sukumol Kunplome condemned the act, declaring she was "shocked" seeing the clip, given the high numbers of spectators and the fact that it was televised at a time when children were likely to watch. She criticised that the show was broadcast inedited even though it was a recording and not live.

On June 18, 2012, the day after the show was broadcast, Workpoint executives were summoned by the Thai Government to give explanation why 'inappropriate' content was allowed when it could be edited. While TV3 faced an examination before the National Broadcasting and Telecommunications Commission (NBTC). The NBTC later issued an administrative act (Verwaltungsakt) imposing a fine of 500,000 baht on TV3 on account of indecency, and ordered the competent authorities to bring both civil and criminal cases against it.

National Artist Chalermchai Kositpipat also commented that the work the woman produced was of no artistic value, saying that "She merely copied the outermost shell of the foreign arts, without realising their substance. What she has done was a display of body, not the presentation of [artistic] integrity."

On June 19, the press stated its findings that the woman is a nude model and was hired for mere ten thousand baht to do so on the show so as to attract ratings. The next day, the woman's parents admitted that their daughter was hired, and pleaded with the public for pity, remarking that they are now detested by the locals even their youngest daughter (the woman's younger sister) was "openly regarded as dirty by her teachers and friends at school".

=== 'Impoverished' singer ===
Also questionable is another 32-year-old woman, Warunee Suwannarak (Thai: วารุณี สุวรรณรักษ์; RTGS: Waruni Suwannarak), who appeared on the show and sang 4 Non Blondes' "What's Up" with a convincing accent of a native speaker of English, contrary to the story she previously told that she merely completed elementary education and is living an impoverished life as a manual labourer. The story itself was also contrary to the pictures she shared on the internet, showing her working as a local singer and her visits to many countries. This caused extensive criticism on the internet, which cast doubt on her 'pitiful' story...a story which was apparently created by the organisers for the purpose of drawing public attention. The woman later admitted that she married a foreigner, but still insisted that her story is true.

== Format ==
=== Broadcast ===
- Audition for 5 weeks.
- Semi-Final 6 weeks.
- The final two weeks.
- The display is cut or not to broadcast will be released via the web. Site in the name. In Thailand gods of Morgan Lane West (Thailand's Got More Talent), as well as the original from England.

=== Audition ===
In March 2012, at the theater Aksara King Power Complex and Work Point studio for 6 days broadcast on Sunday From March 24 to April 1, 2015, 6 at which this cycle is a cycle that will be aired on television in many ways. Countries that do not have an opponent from round to round of auditions for the 321 participants must show their ability to express themselves within 2–4 minutes, which shall have the right to stop. the display. If one third of the people when the Buzzer will stop immediately. The Committee is asked to press the buzzer to stop by any of the Board of Directors will consider the ability to sound at least two of three in the competition to determine who enters the next round or not. Then the tape shows a selection of the finalists of the last remaining 36 shows. Into the finals.

=== Semi-final ===
Finals will be broadcast live on the 36th of the last to audiences throughout the country for six weeks of studio work point. Pathum Thani province. Judging by the votes of the audience through SMS during a live person with the most votes will automatically be finalists. For those who have votes in the first two, and three judges will decide who is qualified by a two-thirds, as well as the fairly steep in this part of the show is taped before a three-hour to an hour. First added to prevent mistakes. The announcement will be broadcast live.

== Semi-final summary ==
The "Number" columns lists the code of appearance each act made for every episode.

=== Semi-final 1 (15 July 2012) ===
Key	Buzzed out	Judges' choice	Won the public vote	Won the judges' vote	No. 2 or 3 of the vote but did not qualify

Number	Artist	Act	Buzzes and judges' choices		
Number	Artist	Act	Pinyo	Pornchita	Jirayut
TGT01	Ta Tueng Mong	Percussion Show	—	—	—
TGT02	Pangpond Chanachai Siripinyochai	Popping Dance	—	—	—
TGT03	Kidbuaksib	Thai Acting art with shadow			
TGT04	Som O Wannapha Boriboon	Sing a song			
TGT05	Jaa Sirirat Supitakkul	Sing a song			
TGT06	TZ CREW	Dance	—	—	—

=== Semi-final 2 (22 July 2012) ===
Key	Buzzed out	Judges' choice	Won the public vote	Won the judges' vote	No. 2 or 3 of the vote but did not qualify

Number	Artist	Act	Buzzes and judges' choices		
Number	Artist	Act	Pinyo	Pornchita	Jirayut
TGT07	Sumet Tulapan	Beat Box			
TGT08	Sid-Mee-Kru	Physical Theater	—	—	—
TGT09	Jay Thephasadin Na Ayutthaya	Singer	—	—	—
TGT10	Lukpad Purimprach Chaiyakam	Cover Dance			
TGT11	Mai Apinya Kanjanamanee	Singer			
TGT12	Voice & Drummer	Music Band	—	—	—

=== Semi-final 3 (29 July 2012) ===
Key	Buzzed out	Judges' choice	Won the public vote	Won the judges' vote	No. 2 or 3 of the vote but did not qualify

Number	Artist	Act	Buzzes and judges' choices		
Number	Artist	Act	Pinyo	Pornchita	Jirayut
TGT13	Satriwithaya-Singh	Gymnaestrada	—	—	—
TGT14	Are You Show	Variety Show	—	—	—
TGT15	Ique Wetsin Chuto	Drum Performance	—	—	—
TGT16	Gig Warunee Suwanurak	Singing (Rolling in the deep:Adele )			
TGT17	My Street	Dance Theatre + Band			
TGT18	David Kim	Singing			

=== Semi-final 4 (4 August 2012) ===
Key	Buzzed out	Judges' choice	Won the public vote	Won the judges' vote	No. 2 or 3 of the vote but did not qualify

Number	Artist	Act	Buzzes and judges' choices		
Number	Artist	Act	Pinyo	Pornchita	Jirayut
TGT19	Thai Home	Thai Style Band	—	—	—
TGT20	Ekkachai Sangthong	Singing	—	—	—
TGT21	Swan Team	Intersection Art			
TGT22	Gail Sophicha Aungkavimongkol	Ukulele			
TGT23	Leng Rachanikorn Keawdee	Aerial Acrobatics			
TGT24	Def-G	Cover Dance (RaNia)	—	—	—

=== Semi-final 5 (19 August 2012) ===
Key	Buzzed out	Judges' choice	Won the public vote	Won the judges' vote	No. 2 or 3 of the vote but did not qualify

Number	Artist	Act	Buzzes and judges' choices		
Number	Artist	Act	Pinyo	Pornchita	Jirayut
TGT25	Grace Riya Suprakobb	Singing	—	—	—
TGT26	Lion Fighter	Mixed martial arts, dance and sports			
TGT27	Rifle Saksatuttha Boonkeb	Singing			
TGT28	Romadorn Suriyan Kosanea	Happening art			
TGT29	BB Diva	Dance with graphics	—	—	—
TGT30	Slide to Unrock	iPhone and iPad band	—	—	—

=== Semi-final 6 (26 August 2012) ===
Key	Buzzed out	Judges' choice	Won the public vote	Won the judges' vote	No. 2 or 3 of the vote but did not qualify

Number	Artist	Act	Buzzes and judges' choices		
Number	Artist	Act	Pinyo	Pornchita	Jirayut
TGT31	Terk Laser	Laser Performance	—	—	—
TGT32	T-Silp	Culter Dance			
TGT33	MUTE	Mime Performance			
TGT34	Thirty Plus	Chorus Show	—	—	—
TGT35	Musatea and Night	B-BOY Dance			
TGT36	Male Rose	J-Rock band	—	—	—

==== Grand final ====
Finals are televised event of the last 12 directors will have the right to press the button. The bus's red. Is the same but without the majority vote of the board in any way. (However, in the introduction rules. MC stated that the Board will not hit the bus, Sir, during the show) in season two for the finals, it will show at the same time as season one, but it will not open by the first week of the season. it's the normal one and the time to 20:15 and the winner will be announced live at 20:15 to 20:30 hours on the day.

Number	contestant	performance	judge's buzzer			result
Number	contestant	performance	Pinyo	Pornchita	Jirayut	result
TGT11	Leng Rachanikorn Keawdee	Aerial Acrobatics				Winner
TGT02	Gail Sophicah Aungkavimongkol	Ukulele and singing"				1st Runner-Up
TGT03	Kidbuaksib	Thai Acting art with shadow				6 Finalist
TGT05	Musatea and Night	B-BOY Dance				6 Finalist
TGT08	Gig Warunee Suwanurak	Singing				6 Finalist
TGT10	Romadorn Suriyan Kosanea	Happening art				6 Finalist
TGT01	Lion Fighter	Mixed martial arts, dance and sports				12 Finalist
TGT04	David Kim	Sing a Song				12 Finalist
TGT06	Sumet Tulapan	Beat Box				12 Finalist
TGT07	T-Silp	Culter Dance				12 Finalist
TGT09	Jaa Sirirat Supitakkul	Sing a song				12 Finalist
TGT12	Mai Apinya Kanjanamanee	Singer				12 Finalist
Special show from Rexona during is winning
—	Miw and Tony	Dancing	—	—	—	—

=== Rating ===
Episode	Date	Rating Sharing		Sorce
Auditions 1	3 June	6.8		
Auditions 2	10 June	9.4		
Auditions 3	17 June	7.9		
Auditions 4	24 June	8.3		
Auditions 5	2 July	8.5		
Auditions 6	8 July	8.2		
Semi-Finals 1	15 July	7.4		
Semi-Finals 2	22 July	??		
Semi-Finals 3	29 July	7.4		
Semi-Finals 4	4 August	5.9		
Semi-Finals 5	19 August	6.0		
Semi-Finals 6	26 August	5.5		
Final	2 September	7.9	10.7	
