= 2010 in Thailand =

- Decades: 1990s; 2000s; 2010s; 2020s
- See also: Other events of 2010; Timeline of Thai history

The year 2010 was the 229th year of the Rattanakosin Kingdom of Thailand. It was the 64th year in the reign of King Bhumibol Adulyadej (Rama IX), and is reckoned as year 2553 in the Buddhist Era. The year saw large anti-government protests which led to a violent military crackdown in May.

== Incumbents ==
- King: Bhumibol Adulyadej
- Crown Prince: Vajiralongkorn
- Prime Minister: Abhisit Vejjajiva
- Supreme Patriarch: Nyanasamvara Suvaddhana

== Events ==
=== March ===
- Miss Thailand Universe 2010 was held in Bangkok on March 20.Fonthip Watcharatrakul was the winner.

=== May ===
- 2010 Thai military crackdown ended on May 19. There were 87 reported deaths and at least 2,000 injuries, 51 missing civilians as of 8 June.

== See also ==
- 2010 Thai Premier League
- 2010 Thai Division 1 League
- 2010 floods in Thailand and north Malaysia
- 2010 in Thai football
- Thailand at the 2010 Asian Games
- 2010 in Thai television
- List of Thai films of 2010
