= 2014 in Thailand =

- Decades: 1990s; 2000s; 2010s; 2020s; 2030s
- See also: Other events of 2014; Timeline of Thai history

The year 2014 was the 233rd year of the Rattanakosin Kingdom of Thailand. It was the 69th year in the reign of King Bhumibol Adulyadej (Rama IX), and is reckoned as year 2557 in the Buddhist Era. Significant events include the continuing political crisis which led to a coup d'état on 22 May.

== Incumbents ==
- King: Bhumibol Adulyadej
- Crown Prince: Vajiralongkorn
- Prime Minister:
  - until 7 May: Yingluck Shinawatra
  - 7 May-22 May: Niwatthamrong Boonsongpaisan (acting)
  - 22 May-24 August: National Council for Peace and Order (junta)
  - starting 24 August: Prayut Chan-o-cha
- Supreme Patriarch: (vacant)

== Events ==
=== January ===
- January 15 - A Thailand-based women's rights group accuses Myanmar of using rape as a weapon of war.
- January 17 - An explosion rocks the protests in Bangkok resulting in dozens of injuries.
- January 19 - A blast at an anti-government protest at Victory Monument in Bangkok injures 28 protesters, seven of them seriously.
- January 21 - The Government of Thailand declares 60-day state of emergency in Bangkok and surrounding provinces from tomorrow as anti-government protests continue.
- January 22 - Kwanchai Praipana, a leader of the pro-government United Front for Democracy Against Dictatorship, is shot in the city of Udon Thani as protesters gather in Bangkok despite the declaration of a state of emergency.
- January 28 - Thai protesters surround the venue of a cabinet meeting in Bangkok.
- January 30 - The Thai Army announces plans to deploy more troops in the streets of Bangkok ahead of Sunday's general election.

=== February ===
- February 2 - Voters go to the polls with concerns about violence between supporters of rival parties.
- February 14 - The government of Thailand deploys thousands of riot police to reclaim areas of Bangkok currently occupied by protesters.
- February 18 - Protesters and police clash after a crackdown ordered by Prime Minister Yingluck Shinawatra with one policeman shot dead and dozens wounded.
- February 23 - At least two people have been killed and 41 injured in an attack on an opposition rally in the Khao Saming District in Trat Province.
- February 24 - Prime Minister Yingluck Shinawatra says she will not resign.
- February 27 - The National Anti-Corruption Commission summon the Prime Minister of Thailand Yingluck Shinawatra to face charges of allegedly mishandling a rice subsidy program as her supporters block access to the building.
- February 28 - At least fifteen children are killed in a school bus crash in the Prachinburi Province.

=== March ===
- March 2 - Voters go to the polls for a rerun of a general election hoped to end the current political crisis.
- March 21 - The Constitutional Court of Thailand invalidates the general election held on February 2, on the grounds that voting was not held on the same day throughout the country.
- March 25 - A bus in Tak Province, plunges into a ravine, killing 30 people and injuring 22.

=== April ===
- April 8 - The southern town of Yala is hit by a series of explosions that kill one person and injure others.
- April 13 - Songkran (Thailand) was celebrated.

=== May ===
- May 5 - The Mae Lao earthquake occurred.
- May 7 - The Constitutional Court of Thailand finds that Prime Minister Yingluck Shinawatra is guilty of abuse of power when she transferred the National Security Council chief in 2011 and that she cannot remain in office.
- May 8 - Thailand's National Anti-Corruption Commission refers former Prime Minister Yingluck Shinawatra to face impeachment charges in the Senate over a failed rice subsidy scheme.
- May 15 - Two people are killed and 21 wounded in an attack on an anti-government protest in Bangkok.
- May 17 - Miss Universe Thailand 2014 took place Weluree Ditsayabu was the winner.
- May 20 - The Royal Thai Army declares martial law after six months of political unrest.
- May 22 - 2014 Thai coup d'état took place. The Royal Thai Armed Forces launched a coup d'état against the Yingluck cabinet of Thailand. Prayuth Chan-ocha became the Prime Minister that day.
- May 23 - Royal Thai Army chief and coup leader General Prayuth Chan-ocha detains former Prime Minister of Thailand Yingluck Shinawatra after summoning her for talks a day after the coup.
- May 24 - 2014 Thai coup d'état
  - The Thai military arrests 35 more individuals, including prominent academics.
  - The military leaders announce the dissolution of the Thai Senate.
- May 26 - Coup leader Prayuth Chan-ocha claims to have the confidence of King of Thailand Bhumibol Adulyadej.

=== June ===
- June 1 - The Royal Thai Armed Forces deploy against major protests planned for today but a small protest goes ahead outside a shopping mall in central Bangkok.
- June 17 - Emergency rule in the southern Thai provinces of Pattani, Yala and Narithiwat is extended for another three months.
- June 30 - A group of gunmen open fire at a mosque in the Panare District in Pattani province, resulting in at least one death.

=== July ===
- July 17 - The Thai military junta gives permission for former Prime Minister Yingluck Shinawatra to travel abroad for the first time since the coup.

=== August ===
- August 21 - The National Assembly of Thailand elects coup leader General Prayuth Chan-ocha as Prime Minister of Thailand.

=== October ===
- October 18 - Uttamanusorn Bridge officially re-opens following its collapse in 2013.

== See also ==
- 2013–14 Thai political crisis
- 2014 Thai Premier League
- 2014 Thai Division 1 League
- 2014 AFC U-16 Championship
- Thailand at the 2014 Winter Olympics
- Thailand at the 2014 Summer Youth Olympics
- 2014 in Thai television
- List of Thai films of 2014
