= 2016 Thai constitutional referendum =

- 7 August 2016
- 1) Do you approve or disapprove of the draft constitution? 2) Do you approve that for contributing continuity of the country reform according to the national strategic plan, it should be stipulated in the Transitory Provisions of the Constitution of the Kingdom of Thailand that for the duration of 5 years from the first sitting of the National Assembly under this constitution; the joint sitting of the two chambers of the National Assembly shall convene to consider approving a person to be appointed as the Prime Minister?

Draft constitution
For	61.35%
Against	38.65%

Election of the Prime Minister
For	58.07%
Against	41.93%
Voter turnout: 59.40%
- Results by province

A constitutional referendum was held in Thailand on 7 August 2016. The charter offered semi-democracy and was seen to tighten military rule in Thailand. It was approved by 61% of voters with a 59% turnout. A second proposal for the next prime minister to be jointly elected by senators and MPs was also approved. The opposition groups to the constitution were barred from formally campaigning against it by the military government, while the military government actively campaigned for its adoption.

== Constitutional drafting ==
The primary difference between the 2016 constitution and the 2007 document was that the Senate would become a fully appointed chamber rather than a partially elected one during the 5-year "transitional period" stipulated in the charter. This was seen as an effort by the National Council for Peace and Order (NCPO) to retain influence once it has left office, as it will have the right to appoint the 250 members. The Senate would also be granted veto power over the House of Representatives on amending the constitution, and a Prime Minister will be allowed to be appointed from outside either house.

== Conduct ==
The NCPO banned criticism of the draft constitution and prohibited monitoring of the referendum. Activists against the document were arrested, detained, and prosecuted in military courts, whilst voters who expressed their intention to vote against the draft were also arrested and prosecuted by the military regime.

350,000 canvassers were scheduled to be trained by the Constitutional Drafting Committee to campaign for the constitution, approximately four per village.

== Opinion polls ==
=== Draft constitution ===
Fieldwork date(s)	Polling firm	Sample	For	Against	Undecided	Lead
25-26 April 2016	NIDA	1,500	35.87%	11.93%	52.20%	
10-11 May 2016	NIDA	1,500	28.33%	8.87%	62.80%	
23-24 May 2016	NIDA	1,500	32.07%	8.67%	59.26%	
6-7 June 2016	NIDA	1,501	28.71%	7.13%	64.16%	
20-21 June 2016	NIDA	1,500	25.40%	6.33%	68.27%	
28-29 June 2016	NIDA	1,500	27.33%	6.80%	65.87%	
5-6 July 2016	NIDA	1,500	26.33%	6.20%	67.47%	
12-13 July 2016	NIDA	1,500	30.41%	6.79%	62.80%	
20-21 July 2016	NIDA	1,500	32.27%	5.93%	61.80%	
25-26 July 2016	NIDA	1,500	33.07%	6.27%	60.66%	
2-6 August 2016	NIDA	5,849	76.87%	18.68%	4.45%	

=== Election of the prime minister ===
Fieldwork date(s)	Polling firm	Sample	For	Against	Undecided	Lead
25-26 April 2016	NIDA	1,500	38.20%	26.27%	35.53%	
10-11 May 2016	NIDA	1,500	31.93%	27.33%	40.74%	
23-24 May 2016	NIDA	1,500	29.20%	21.93%	48.87%	
6-7 June 2016	NIDA	1,501	27.38%	18.92%	53.70%	
20-21 June 2016	NIDA	1,500	26.40%	17.27%	56.33%	
28-29 June 2016	NIDA	1,500	27.80%	20.20%	52.00%	
5-6 July 2016	NIDA	1,500	24.87%	17.60%	57.53%	
12-13 July 2016	NIDA	1,500	29.01%	19.16%	51.83%	
20-21 July 2016	NIDA	1,500	29.40%	21.13%	49.47%	
25-26 July 2016	NIDA	1,500	28.13%	19.73%	52.14%	
2-6 August 2016	NIDA	5,849	58.35%	38.26%	3.39%	

== Results ==
Turnout for the vote was at 59%. The vote was rejected in the pro-Thaksin Isan provinces and even more firmly in the three Muslim majority southern provinces. The 'Yes' camp accounted for 61.4 per cent of the voter turn-out, while the 'No' faction garnered 38.6 per cent, with 94 per cent of the votes counted on the day after.

BBC reported that there are many cited reasons for the result, including repression on campaigning and criticizing the charter with only a few people that actually saw a copy. The drafters argued that it will address political corruption and help reform the country. Some trusted the military junta. Many voters were tired of endless political crisis and saw the charter as a way back to normality.

Question	For		Against		Invalid/ blank	Total	Registered voters	Turnout	Outcome
Question	Votes	%	Votes	%	Invalid/ blank	Total	Registered voters	Turnout	Outcome
Draft constitution	16,820,402	61.35	10,598,037	38.65	2,322,238	29,740,677	50,071,589	59.40	Approved
Election of the Prime Minister	15,132,050	58.07	10,926,648	41.93	3,681,979	29,740,677	50,071,589	59.40	Approved
Source: Bangkok Post

=== By province ===
Province	Draft Constitution				Election of the Prime Minister				Invalid/ blank	Total votes	Registered voters	Turnout
Province	For		Against		For		Against		Invalid/ blank	Total votes	Registered voters	Turnout
Province	Votes	%	Votes	%	Votes	%	Votes	%	Invalid/ blank	Total votes	Registered voters	Turnout
Ang Thong	70,958	58.84	49,641	41.16	63,378	55.74	50,328	44.26	4,914	131,503	225,231	58.39
Ayutthaya	216,278	60.57	140,804	39.43	195,627	57.40	145,178	42.60	14,380	387,429	632,905	61.22
Bangkok	1,585,533	69.22	705,195	30.78	1,482,723	65.57	778,724	34.43	36,362	2,370,477	4,450,224	53.27
Chai Nat	93,967	64.05	52,738	35.95	82,999	60.55	54,078	39.45	6,372	161,692	265,183	60.97
Chachoengsao	204,136	68.79	92,616	31.21	185,922	65.85	96,441	34.15	10,494	321,981	540,441	59.58
Chanthaburi	176,029	74.74	59,485	25.26	161,171	71.42	64,492	28.58	7,918	253,531	412,681	61.44
Chonburi	430,361	76.45	132,554	23.55	401,957	73.46	145,215	26.54	14,888	595,684	1,094,654	54.42
Kanchanaburi	226,825	68.71	103,288	31.29	203,496	64.98	109,683	35.02	13,171	360,497	617,725	58.36
Lopburi	205,619	64.22	114,528	35.78	183,274	61.24	116,014	38.76	13,533	350,872	593,479	59.12
Rayong	221,196	78.68	59,932	21.32	203,825	75.10	67,584	24.90	7,569	298,788	515,669	57.94
Ratchaburi	291,475	75.38	95,214	24.62	264,298	71.97	102,912	28.03	15,335	419,344	663,872	63.17
Nakhon Nayok	76,566	70.63	31,839	29.37	68,835	67.42	33,271	32.58	4,179	118,267	203,240	58.19
Nakhon Pathom	271,394	68.64	124,018	31.36	248,400	65.40	131,410	34.60	13,869	425,499	704,734	60.37
Nonthaburi	343,771	67.37	166,490	32.63	318,607	63.80	180,797	36.20	10,629	532,690	946,384	56.29
Pathum Thani	278,265	62.93	163,918	37.07	256,930	59.61	174,086	40.39	11,518	467,712	845,403	55.32
Prachuap Khiri Khan	186,361	82.93	38,355	17.07	174,575	80.18	43,141	19.82	6,877	239,154	403,306	59.30
Prachinburi	148,567	69.01	66,701	30.99	133,652	65.72	69,701	34.28	7,140	232,939	371,221	62.75
Sa Kaeo	156,955	71.16	63,617	28.84	140,689	67.69	67,155	32.31	7,289	239,070	416,866	57.35
Saraburi	193,686	63.27	94,224	36.73	176,085	64.42	97,241	35.58	12,012	314,015	490,059	64.08
Samut Prakan	318,571	65.50	167,798	34.50	294,355	62.15	179,280	37.85	12,353	513,725	987,597	52.02
Samut Sakhon	152,465	72.05	59,159	27.95	140,901	68.83	63,806	31.17	7,031	226,285	405,571	55.79
Samut Songkhram	62,948	77.40	18,385	22.60	57,810	74.10	20,210	25.90	3,277	88,744	156,066	56.86
Sing Buri	56,446	58.62	39,840	41.38	50,510	55.59	40,359	44.41	12,012	314,015	490,059	64.08
Suphan Buri	223,114	60.81	143,798	39.19	198,547	57.47	146,937	42.53	14,294	400,013	668,904	59.80
Trat	72,469	79.41	18,790	20.59	66,245	75.73	21,229	24.27	3,019	98,585	169,004	58.33
Central Region	6,551,370	69.43	2,883,907	30.57	6,017,608	66.09	3,087,165	33.91	274,800	10,050,982	17,580,470	57.17
Chumphon	208,068	90.04	23,004	9.96	196,293	87.51	28,023	12.49	5,347	244,052	388,203	62.87
Krabi	161,520	83.99	30,787	16.01	151,725	81.15	35,241	18.85	5,086	205,052	330,771	61.99
Nakhon Sri Thammarat	559,689	88.05	75,927	11.95	526,123	85.93	86,158	14.07	17,192	677,488	1,181,793	57.33
Narathiwat	109,348	36.04	194,020	63.96	103,969	35.38	189,858	64.62	24,324	342,255	517,803	66.10
Pattani	89,952	35.02	166,900	64.98	85,976	34.33	164,449	65.67	21,654	291,370	468,173	62.24
Phang Nga	97,952	84.23	18,344	15.77	91,886	81.43	20,952	18.57	3,280	123,981	197,709	62.71
Phatthalung	213,900	84.55	39,087	15.45	199,195	81.38	45,591	18.62	5,794	269,040	404,111	66.58
Phuket	125,643	88.03	17,081	11.97	118,969	85.59	20,022	14.41	3,181	150,326	274,407	54.78
Ranong	64,234	87.10	9,512	12.90	59,358	84.19	11,145	15.81	2,242	78,856	131,375	60.02
Satun	91,835	70.20	38,986	29.80	84,237	67.17	41,174	32.83	4,472	141,735	224,010	63.27
Songkhla	506,752	82.26	109,283	17.74	475,959	80.26	117,052	19.74	17,209	656,640	1,038,904	63.21
Surat Thani	377,628	87.29	54,980	12.71	352,558	84.22	66,048	15.78	10,593	457,921	782,820	58.50
Trang	250,644	86.19	40,170	13.81	233,949	83.54	46,080	16.46	7,351	310,797	481,819	64.50
Yala	81,759	39.93	122,988	60.07	77,963	39.23	120,792	60.77	15,025	229,888	351,135	65.47
Southern Region	2,938,924	75.75	941,049	24.25	2,758,160	73.54	992,585	26.46	142,750	4,179,401	6,773,033	61.71
Chiang Mai	390,046	45.92	459,399	54.08	340,577	42.63	458,384	57.37	38,165	933,449	1,275,798	73.17
Chiang Rai	249,684	45.02	304,976	54.98	211,333	41.08	303,066	58.92	25,524	618,734	914,756	67.64
Lampang	193,758	51.72	180,863	48.28	167,969	48.53	178,128	51.47	17,663	417,567	624,436	66.87
Lamphun	109,495	48.08	118,258	51.92	94,067	44.87	115,555	55.13	11,133	254,511	332,822	76.47
Phrae	102,745	46.21	119,594	53.79	87,944	42.71	117,973	57.29	8,027	244,567	374,771	65.26
Nan	122,142	52.83	109,057	47.17	104,028	48.32	111,282	51.68	9,137	255,344	385,641	66.21
Mae Hong Son	69,439	64.18	38,757	35.82	59,696	59.32	40,939	40.68	5,105	121,282	163,096	74.36
Tak	160,674	72.69	60,377	27.31	142,085	69.37	62,732	30.63	3,019	98,585	169,004	58.33
Uttaradit	124,356	60.27	81,982	39.73	108,946	56.65	83,360	43.35	7,051	225,105	367,752	61.21
Phitsanulok	265,136	68.96	119,348	31.04	238,207	65.02	128,156	34.98	12,731	415,539	681,358	60.99
Kamphaeng Phet	217,926	71.84	85,354	28.14	194,400	68.24	90,465	31.76	12,662	334,102	508,758	65.67
Nakhon Sawan	289,393	67.01	142,471	32.99	258,564	63.68	147,482	36.32	16,970	475,347	836,014	56.86
Sukhothai	188,608	70.25	79,598	29.75	166,417	66.32	84,515	33.68	9,719	294,051	457,837	64.23
Phetchabun	286,163	69.20	127,342	30.80	252,771	65.70	131,981	34.30	16,819	457,013	740,443	61.72
Phichit	141,330	65.33	75,000	34.67	124,335	61.61	77,490	38.39	7,910	236,738	429,912	55.07
Uthai Thani	106,884	74.74	36,123	25.26	96,096	71.32	38,648	28.68	4,954	155,472	256,685	60.57
Phayao	109,408	47.15	122,649	52.85	93,651	43.63	121,001	56.37	9,095	258,004	394,595	65.38
Northern Region	3,020,303	57.58	2,225,285	42.42	2,644,990	54.01	2,252,509	45.99	218,944	5,788,045	8,840,048	65.48
Amnat Charoen	87,314	54.69	72,346	45.31	74,976	49.88	75,344	50.12	4,811	174,416	291,118	59.91
Buriram	365,041	60.22	241,101	39.78	317,347	56.29	246,433	43.71	22,846	670,300	1,199,590	55.88
Chaiyaphum	204,055	45.63	243,144	54.37	174,994	42.29	238,826	57.71	16.867	497,591	885,070	56.22
Loei	158,394	54.19	133,890	45.81	135,059	49.91	135,520	50.09	11,185	324,607	492,944	65.85
Kalasin	180,465	45.03	220,317	54.97	152,047	40.81	220,501	59.19	12,693	441,164	771,851	57.16
Khon Kaen	333,807	44.91	409,453	55.09	291,657	41.74	407,011	58.26	25,062	815,191	1,419,106	57.44
Maha Sarakham	172,392	42.41	234,140	57.59	147,298	38.42	236,107	61.58	12,706	443,811	764,982	58.02
Mukdahan	56,544	37.99	92,282	62.01	47,840	34.63	90,315	65.37	5,257	165,547	265,088	62.45
Nakhon Ratchasima	730,985	64.39	404,261	35.61	649,052	60.78	418,789	39.22	17,192	677,488	1,181,793	57.33
Nakhon Phanom	139,497	47.23	155,830	52.77	114,920	41.96	158,949	58.04	8,326	317,047	542,910	58.40
Nong Bua Lamphu	77,167	39.75	116,958	60.25	66,883	36.70	115,350	63.30	6,202	214,347	390,371	54.91
Nong Khai	86,557	44.29	108,874	55.71	74,924	40.96	108,005	59.04	6,980	215,259	395,902	54.37
Roi Et	186,931	35.98	332,587	64.02	157,587	32.12	333,023	67.88	15,360	564,729	1,035,036	54.56
Sakhon Nakhon	217,372	47.89	236,497	52.11	183,391	42.74	245,699	57.26	12,574	495,262	869,581	56.95
Sisaket	244,499	42.46	331,314	57.54	205,001	38.22	331,359	61.78	23,297	640,666	1,116,545	57.38
Surin	259,668	49.22	267,917	50.78	225,364	45.09	274,411	54.91	20,197	580,293	1,055,964	54.95
Ubon Ratchathani	413,901	54.77	341,848	45.23	353,493	49.83	355,885	50.17	24,980	832,295	1,399,518	59.47
Udon Thani	248,092	40.66	362,023	59.34	215,084	37.51	358,338	62.49	20,414	669,943	1,202,878	55.70
Yasothon	81,272	36.35	142,284	63.65	69,329	32.58	143,454	67.42	6,130	243,093	426,224	57.03
North Eastern Region	4,309,805	48.66	4,547,776	51.34	3,711,292	44.68	4,594,389	55.32	299,715	9,722,249	16,878,002	57.60
Source: ECT

== Aftermath ==
The next task of the Constitutional Drafting Committee was to draw up organic laws governing the new political system. The military continued to stay in power past the royal succession, following the death of king Bhumibol. The draft constitution would undergo six changes at the request of the new king, Maha Vajiralongkorn, which expanded his powers, before being ratified on 6 April 2017.

Political parties were expected to dissolve themselves and reform, possibly ending up as smaller parties, as the new voting system made it harder for larger parties to win an overall majority and more likely for a coalition government to be formed.

Elections were eventually held in 2019, with the Phalang Pracharat Party, a pro-junta party, forming a coalition government. Prayut Chan-o-cha, prime minister and leader of the military government, was elected prime minister of the new government, with his nomination being possible because the new constitution allowed non-members of parliament to become prime minister.

The new government will be subject to supervision by the appointed Senate as well as other constitutional bodies. Impeachment of politicians has also become easier. Future governments are also required to adhere to the 20-year plan by the military.

The military is expected to remain a significant actor in Thai politics for many years.

== See also ==
- August 2016 Thailand bombings
