= 2013 PTT Thailand Open =

- Date: 21–29 September
- Edition: 11th
- Surface: Hard
- Location: Bangkok, Thailand
- Venue: Impact Arena

Champions

Singles
- (Canada) Milos Raonic

Doubles
- (United Kingdom) Jamie Murray / (Australia) John Peers
← 2012 ·	PTT Thailand Open

The 2013 PTT Thailand Open was a men's tennis tournament played on indoor hard courts. It was the 11th and last edition of the Thailand Open, and part of the ATP World Tour 250 Series of the 2013 ATP World Tour. It took place at the Impact Arena in Bangkok, Thailand, from 21 September through 29 September 2013. Third-seeded Milos Raonic won the singles title.

== Finals ==
=== Singles ===
- (Canada) Milos Raonic defeated (Czech Republic) Tomáš Berdych, 7–6^{(7–4)}, 6–3

=== Doubles ===
- (United Kingdom) Jamie Murray / (Australia) John Peers defeated (Poland) Tomasz Bednarek / (Sweden) Johan Brunström, 6–3, 3–6, [10–6]

== Singles main-draw entrants ==
=== Seeds ===
Country	Player	Rank*	Seed
CZE	Tomáš Berdych	6	1
FRA	Richard Gasquet	9	2
CAN	Milos Raonic	11	3
FRA	Gilles Simon	16	4
RUS	Mikhail Youzhny	20	5
ESP	Feliciano López	26	6
FIN	Jarkko Nieminen	42	7
CZE	Lukáš Rosol	46	8

- Rankings are as of September 16, 2013

=== Other entrants ===
The following players received wildcards into the singles main draw:

- (Serbia) Laslo Djere
- (South Korea) Jeong Suk-young
- (Thailand) Wishaya Trongcharoenchaikul

The following players received entry from the qualifying draw:

- (Switzerland) Marco Chiudinelli
- (Colombia) Alejandro Falla
- (Colombia) Santiago Giraldo
- (Japan) Go Soeda

=== Withdrawals ===
Before the tournament

- (Croatia) Ivan Dodig
- (United Kingdom) Andy Murray (back surgery)
- (Spain) Tommy Robredo

=== Retirements ===
- (Croatia) Ivo Karlović (back injury)

== Doubles main-draw entrants ==
=== Seeds ===
Country	Player	Country	Player	Rank^{1}	Seed
IND	Mahesh Bhupathi	SWE	Robert Lindstedt	28	1
ITA	Daniele Bracciali	IND	Leander Paes	50	2
GBR	Jamie Murray	AUS	John Peers	75	3
POL	Tomasz Bednarek	SWE	Johan Brunström	110	4

- Rankings are as of September 16, 2013

=== Other entrants ===
The following pairs received wildcards into the doubles main draw:

- (Serbia) Laslo Djere / (Thailand) Wishaya Trongcharoenchaikul
- (Chinese Taipei) Lu Yen-hsun / (Thailand) Danai Udomchoke
