= 2013 PTT Thailand Open – Singles =

Singles
- 2013 PTT Thailand Open

Final
- Champion: (Canada) Milos Raonic
- Runner-up: (Czech Republic) Tomáš Berdych
- Score: 7–6^{(7–4)}, 6–3

Details
- Draw: 28 (4 Q / 3 WC )
- Seeds: 8

Events
| Singles | Doubles |
| ← 2012 · | PTT Thailand Open |

Richard Gasquet was the defending champion, but lost to Milos Raonic in the semifinals.
Raonic went on to win the title, defeating Tomáš Berdych in the final, 7–6^{(7–4)}, 6–3.

== Seeds ==
1. (Czech Republic) Tomáš Berdych (final)
2. (France) Richard Gasquet (semifinals)
3. (Canada) Milos Raonic (champion)
4. (France) Gilles Simon (semifinals)
5. (Russia) Mikhail Youzhny (quarterfinals)
6. (Spain) Feliciano López (quarterfinals)
7. (Finland) Jarkko Nieminen (first round)
8. (Czech Republic) Lukáš Rosol (second round)

== Draw ==
=== Key ===
- Q = Qualifier
- WC = Wild card
- LL = Lucky loser
- Alt = Alternate
- SE = Special exempt
- PR = Protected ranking
- ITF = ITF entry
- JE = Junior exempt
- w/o = Walkover
- r = Retired
- d = Defaulted
- SR = Special ranking

=== Finals ===
Semifinals
1 | (Czech Republic) Tomáš Berdych | 6^{5} | 6 | 7
4 | (France) Gilles Simon | 7^{7} | 2 | 5
3 | (Canada) Milos Raonic | 3 | 7 | 6
2 | (France) Richard Gasquet | 6 | 5 | 4

Final
1 | (Czech Republic) Tomáš Berdych | 6^{4} | 3
3 | (Canada) Milos Raonic | 7^{7} | 6

=== Top half ===
First round
Q | (Switzerland) M Chiudinelli | 5 | 6^{2}
(Spain) R Bautista-Agut | 7 | 7^{7}
(Chinese Taipei) Y-h Lu | 6 | 6
(Russia) E Donskoy | 3 | 2
(Poland) Ł Kubot | 3 | 6 | 6^{2}
8 | (Czech Republic) L Rosol | 6 | 3 | 7^{7}
(Croatia) I Karlović | 7^{7} | 4 | 2^{r}
(Australia) B Tomic | 6^{3} | 6 | 4
(Netherlands) R Haase | 6 | 6
(Spain) D Gimeno-Traver | 2 | 4
(Netherlands) I Sijsling | 6 | 7^{7}
7 | (Finland) J Nieminen | 3 | 6^{2}

Second round
1 | (Czech Republic) T Berdych | 6 | 6
(Spain) R Bautista-Agut | 3 | 3
(Chinese Taipei) Y-h Lu | 6 | 6
8 | (Czech Republic) L Rosol | 3 | 2
4 | (France) G Simon | 6 | 7
(Australia) B Tomic | 4 | 5
(Netherlands) R Haase | 7^{9} | 4 | 6^{2}
(Netherlands) I Sijsling | 6^{7} | 6 | 7^{7}

Quarterfinals
1 | (Czech Republic) T Berdych | 7^{9} | 6
(Chinese Taipei) Y-h Lu | 6^{7} | 4
4 | (France) G Simon | 6 | 5 | 6
(Netherlands) I Sijsling | 4 | 7 | 4

Semifinals
1 | (Czech Republic) T Berdych | 6^{5} | 6 | 7
4 | (France) G Simon | 7^{7} | 2 | 5

=== Bottom half ===
First round
6 | (Spain) F López | 6 | 6
WC | (Serbia) L Djere | 3 | 3
Q | (Japan) G Soeda | 3 | 6 | 6
Q | (Colombia) S Giraldo | 6 | 1 | 2
WC | (Thailand) W Trongcharoenchaikul | 1 | 1
(Australia) M Matosevic | 6 | 6
5 | (Russia) M Youzhny | 6 | 6
(Italy) P Lorenzi | 3 | 2
WC | (South Korea) S-y Jeong | 3 | 0
(Uzbekistan) D Istomin | 6 | 6
(Slovakia) L Lacko | 6 | 6
Q | (Colombia) A Falla | 3 | 2

Second round
6 | (Spain) F López | 7^{7} | 6
Q | (Japan) G Soeda | 6^{5} | 3
(Australia) M Matosevic | 6^{3} | 6 | 4
3 | (Canada) M Raonic | 7^{7} | 4 | 6
5 | (Russia) M Youzhny | 6 | 6
(Uzbekistan) D Istomin | 3 | 3
(Slovakia) L Lacko | 3 | 2
2 | (France) R Gasquet | 6 | 6

Quarterfinals
6 | (Spain) F López | 4 | 3
3 | (Canada) M Raonic | 6 | 6
5 | (Russia) M Youzhny | 7 | 3 | 1
2 | (France) R Gasquet | 5 | 6 | 6

Semifinals
3 | (Canada) M Raonic | 3 | 7 | 6
2 | (France) R Gasquet | 6 | 5 | 4

== Qualifying ==
=== Seeds ===
1. (Colombia) Santiago Giraldo (qualified)
2. (Colombia) Alejandro Falla (qualified)
3. (Japan) Go Soeda (qualified)
4. (Switzerland) Marco Chiudinelli (qualified)
5. (Japan) Hiroki Moriya (qualifying competition)
6. (Israel) Amir Weintraub (second round)
7. (Japan) Shuichi Sekiguchi (first round)
8. (India) Karunuday Singh (qualifying competition)

=== Qualifiers ===
1. (Colombia) Santiago Giraldo
2. (Colombia) Alejandro Falla
3. (Japan) Go Soeda
4. (Switzerland) Marco Chiudinelli

=== Qualifying draw ===
==== First qualifier ====
| First round | | | | Second round | | | | | Qualifying competition |
| | | | | 1 | (Colombia) Santiago Giraldo | 6 | 6 |
| (Thailand) Nutthanon Kadchapanan | 6^{4} | 6 | 3 | | (South Korea) Jun Woong-sun | 4 | 2 |
| (South Korea) Jun Woong-sun | 7^{7} | 3 | 6 | | | | | | 1 | (Colombia) Santiago Giraldo | 6 | 6 |
| (Canada) Kelsey Stevenson | 6 | 3 | 0 | | | | | | 5 | (Japan) Hiroki Moriya | 4 | 1 |
| (Thailand) Kittipong Wachiramanowong | 3 | 6 | 6 | | (Thailand) Kittipong Wachiramanowong | 5 | 6 | 3 |
| | | | | 5 | (Japan) Hiroki Moriya | 7 | 4 | 6 |

==== Second qualifier ====
First round
(Chinese Taipei) Hung Jui-chen | 6 | 3 | 6
(Thailand) Dane Chuntraruk | 1 | 6 | 2
(Austria) Oliver Marach | 6 | 6
(Thailand) Singekrawee Wattanakul | 3 | 0
(United States) Nicholas Monroe | 3 | 2
6 | (Israel) Amir Weintraub | 6 | 6

Second round
2 | (Colombia) Alejandro Falla | 6 | 6
(Chinese Taipei) Hung Jui-chen | 1 | 0
(Austria) Oliver Marach | 6 | 6
6 | (Israel) Amir Weintraub | 4 | 4

Qualifying competition
2 | (Colombia) Alejandro Falla | 7^{7} | 6
(Austria) Oliver Marach | 6^{2} | 3

==== Third qualifier ====
First round
(Thailand) Punn Bodhidatta | 6 | 6
(China) Wang Hufu | 3 | 3
(Thailand) Chayanon Kaewsuto | 5 | 6 | 6
WC | (Thailand) Watcharaphong Iam La-Or | 7 | 1 | 1
(Germany) Simon Stadler | 7^{7} | 6
7 | (Japan) Shuichi Sekiguchi | 6^{2} | 4

Second round
3 | (Japan) Go Soeda | 6 | 6
(Thailand) Punn Bodhidatta | 4 | 4
(Thailand) Chayanon Kaewsuto | 1 | 2
(Germany) Simon Stadler | 6 | 6

Qualifying competition
3 | (Japan) Go Soeda | 6^{2} | 7 | 6
(Germany) Simon Stadler | 7^{7} | 5 | 4

==== Fourth qualifier ====
First round
(Germany) Christopher Kas | 6 | 6
WC | (Thailand) Aviruth Phaphui | 2 | 3
(Thailand) Warit Sornbutnark | 6 | 6
WC | (Thailand) Warut Korkiatthaworn | 2 | 2
(Thailand) Pruchya Isaro | 2 | 6 | 6^{8}
8 | (India) Karunuday Singh | 6 | 4 | 7^{10}

Second round
4/WC | (Switzerland) Marco Chiudinelli | 4 | 6 | 6
(Germany) Christopher Kas | 6 | 1 | 4
(Thailand) Warit Sornbutnark | 6 | 5 | 6^{4}
8 | (India) Karunuday Singh | 4 | 7 | 7^{7}

Qualifying competition
4/WC | (Switzerland) Marco Chiudinelli | 4 | 6 | 6
8 | (India) Karunuday Singh | 6 | 1 | 4
