= Phanchanokchon Phansang =

Thai actor (born 2013)

- พันธ์ชนกชนม์ พันธ์สังข์
- Born: October 17, 2013 (age 12); Bangkok, Thailand
- Other name: Jaokhun (เจ้าคุณ)
- Occupation: Actor
- Years active: 2019–present
- Notable work: Wanthong (2021), Marital Justice (2024)

Phanchanokchon Phansang (Thai: พันธ์ชนกชนม์ พันธ์สังข์; born 17 October 2013), known by his nickname Jaokhun (Thai: เจ้าคุณ), is a Thai actor. He is best known for his roles as Kuman Thong in Wanthong (2021) and Not in Marital Justice (2024), for which he became the youngest actor to receive a Nataraja Award.

== Early life and education ==
Jaokhun was born in Bangkok, Thailand, on 17 October 2013. He is currently studying in Grade 6 at Maepra Fatima School.

== Career ==
He entered the entertainment industry at the age of six in 2019, appearing in several music videos and commercials. Later, he was cast as Kuman Thong in the drama series Wanthong (2021), which made him widely known and praised by audiences as a talented child actor. He also donated 500 baht of his savings to help cancer patients.

In 2024, he starred as Not in Marital Justice, for which he won the Best Child Actor awards at the Golden Kinnaree Awards and Ganesha Awards, and Best Supporting Actor at the Kom Chad Luek Awards and Nataraja Awards.

== Filmography ==
=== Film ===
Year	Title	Role	Notes
2025	4 Graveyards	Somrak	Recurring role

=== Television ===
Year	Title	Role	Notes	Network
2021	Wanthong	Kuman Thong	Recurring role	One31
2022	The Giver	Phap Santiphap Phuangbun	Guest role	One31
2022	My Romance From Far Away	Tawan	Main role	Channel 3
2022	When the Sky Falls	Young Thewarat	Recurring role	One31
2023	The Bride of Naga	Wannet	Recurring role	One31
2023	The Return of Little Super Girl	Thawin	Recurring role	One31 / oneD
2024	Marital Justice	Not Panot	Recurring role	One31 / oneD
2024	The Empress of Ayodhaya	Phra Yotfa	Recurring role	One31 / oneD

== Awards and nominations ==
Year	Award	Category	Work	Result	Ref.
2025	10th Golden Kinnaree Awards	Rising Child Actor	Marital Justice	Won	
2025	13th Ganesha Awards	Best Child Actor	Marital Justice	Won	
2025	21st Kom Chad Luek Awards	Best Supporting Actor	Marital Justice	Won	
2025	16th Nataraja Awards	Best Supporting Actor – Drama	Marital Justice	Won	
