= Luang Por Khun Parissuddho =

Thai Buddhist monk

Phra Devavidhyāgama (Khun Parissuddho)
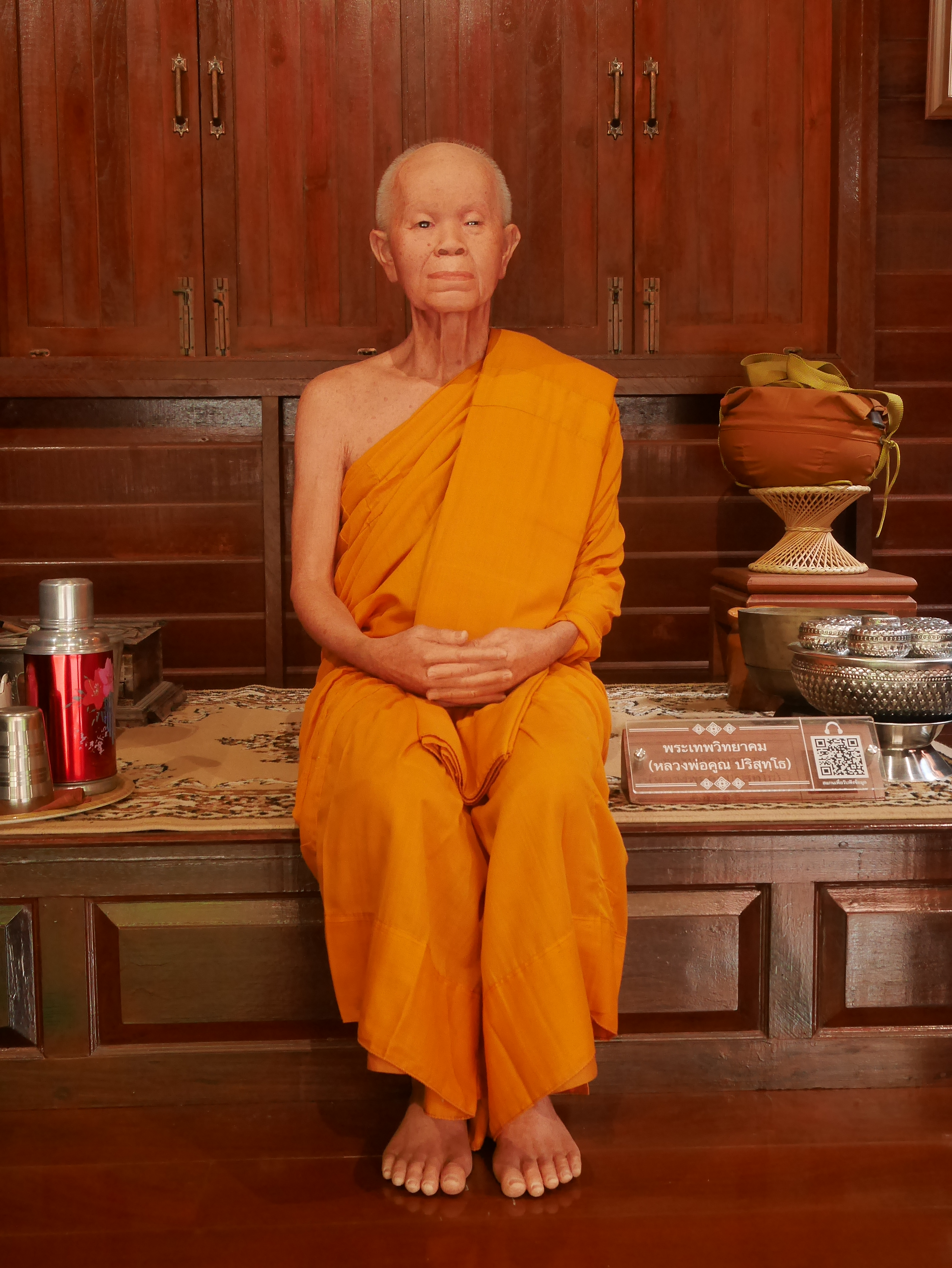
- Title: Phra Devavidhyāgama(2004)

Personal life
- Born: Khun Chatproklang; 4 October 1923 Nakhon Ratchasima, Thailand
- Died: 16 May 2015 (aged 91) Nakhon Ratchasima, Thailand
- Other name: Luang Por Khun
- Occupation: Buddhist monk

Religious life
- Religion: Buddhism
- Dharma name: Parisuddho

Senior posting
- Teacher: Luang Por Khong Bhuddhasaro
- Based in: Wat Ban Rai

Phra Devavidhyāgama (Thai: พระเทพวิทยาคม, born Khun Chatproklang; 4 October 1923 – 16 May 2015) or in honorific name Khun Parisuddho (Thai: คูณ ปริสุทฺโธ) was a Thai Buddhist monk based in Wat Ban Rai.

== Early life ==
He was born on 4 October 1923. His birthname was Khun Chatproklang (คูณ ฉัตร์พลกรัง) and he was the son of Bun and Thongkhao Chatproklang. He had two younger sisters. He and his sisters were looked after by his aunt after their parents died during his youth. When he was 6 years old, he started studying Buddhism and Thai language with Ajahn Chueam Widdharo, Ajahn Chai and Ajahn Lee.

== Dhamma life ==
He was ordained in Wat Thanon Hak Yai on 5 May 1934, with dhamma name Parissuddho. He was a student of Luang Por Daeng from Wat Ban Nong Phoe. He was a bhikku who strictly practiced Dhamma, and was respected by many people.

Later, he became a student of Luang Phor Khong Bhuddhasaro. Understanding the Dhamma he then went Dhamma travel in Nakhon Ratchasima province, then further Dhamma travel to Laos and Cambodia. In 1939, he returned to Nakhon Ratchasima Province where with help from the people of Ban Rai village then developed Wat Ban Rai Buddhist Temple.

== Death ==
He resided at the temple until he passed away on 12 May 2015, age 91 years old. His funeral was held on 29 January 2019, at Khon Kaen University.
