= 2011 in Thai football =

Football in Thailand
- Season: 2011

The 2011 season of competitive football in Thailand.

The season will begin on 12 February 2011 for the Thai Premier League and Division 1 and 25 December 2011 for the Thai Premier League.

== Promotion and relegation (pre-season) ==
Teams promoted to Thai Premier League 2011

- Sriracha
- Khonkaen
- Chiangrai United

Teams relegated from Thai Premier League 2010

- Bangkok United

Teams promoted to Thai Division 1 League 2011

- Buriram
- F.C. Phuket
- Chiangmai
- Chainat
- J.W. Rangsit
- Bangkok
- Gulf Saraburi

Clubs Serving Bans for Thai Division 1 League 2011

- Nakhon Pathom

Teams relegated from Thai Division 1 League 2010

- Prachinburi
- Nara United

== Diary of the season ==
- 20 January 2011: Chonburi won the Kor Royal Cup beating Muangthong United 2-1 at Suphachalasai Stadium.

== National team ==
=== Friendly matches ===
12 July 2011
11:00 UTC+7

Thailand	1 - 0	Myanmar
Dangda 2'

Thunder Castle Stadium, Buriram
Attendance: 20,000
13 July 2011
UTC+7

Thailand	1 - 1	Myanmar
Pornsai 16'		Piang Sor 63'

Thunder Castle Stadium, Buriram
Attendance: 20,000

=== Olympic qualifiers ===
23 February 2011
18:00 UTC+07:00

Thailand	0 – 3	Palestine
Narat 43'	Report

Suphachalasai Stadium, Bangkok
Attendance: 6,000
Referee: Kim Sang-Woo (Korea Republic)

Palestine was awarded a 3-0 win after Thailand fielded an ineligible player, Sujarit Jantakul. The original score was 1–0 to Thailand.

9 March 2011
18:00 UTC+02:00

Palestine	1 – 0 (a.e.t.)	Thailand
Abu Habib 45'	Report
Penalties
(may not be in correct order); Nadim Baragtha (penalty scored); Hisham Ali (penalty scored); Khaled Salem (penalty scored); Muath Abdallah (penalty scored); Ahmed Miari (penalty scored); Amjad Al Fawaghra (penalty missed); Fayez Isaili (penalty missed)	5–6	(may not be in correct order); (penalty scored) Seeket Madputeh; (penalty scored) Chalermsuk Kaewsuktae; (penalty scored) Krirkrit Thaweekarn; (penalty scored) Phuritad Jarikanon; (penalty scored) Pokklaw A-nan; (penalty scored) Weerawut Kayem; (penalty missed) Attapong Nooprom

Faisal Al-Husseini International Stadium, West Bank
Attendance: 16,000
Referee: Banjar Al-Dosari (Qatar)

1–1 on aggregate. Thailand won after penalties, but Palestine will replace them in the second round after fielding an ineligible player.

== Honours ==
Competition	Winner	Details	Match Report
Thai FA Cup	Buriram PEA	Muangthong United	
Thai Premier League	Buriram PEA	Chonburi F.C.	
Division 1 League	Buriram F.C.	Chainat F.C.	
Regional League	Ratchaburi F.C.	Nakhon Ratchasima F.C.	
Kor Royal Cup	Chonburi	Kor Royal Cup 2011; Beat Muangthong United 2–1	
