= 22 December 2013 South Thailand bombings =

Terrorist incident in Thailand

2013 South Thailand bombings
- Part of the South Thailand insurgency
- Location: Danok, Padang Besar, and Sadao, Songkhla, Thailand
- Date: 22 December 2013 (UTC+7)
- Target: Various
- Attack type: Multiple vehicle bombings
- Deaths: 2
- Injuries: 27 estimated
- Perpetrator: possibly Pattani insurgents

The 2013 Southern Thailand bombings were a series of bombings that took place in Danok, Padang Besar and Sadao, Songkhla Province, Thailand near the Malaysian border on 22 December 2013.

== Attacks ==
The first explosion occurred around 10:30 and 10:40 in the morning when a bomb placed on a motorcycle exploded in front of the Padang Besar police station on the Thai side of the border. No one was injured in the blast

The second bomb exploded at about the same time. It was also placed on a motorcycle and went off in front of the Sadao police station. Also no one was injured.

The third bomb went off in front of the Oliver Hotel in Danok. It was placed in a car and activated with a digital watch. The explosions also resulted in a fire, which destroyed the business premises, several vehicles as well as a part of the hotel.

The fourth bomb was set off in front of a shop in Bukit Kayu Hitam on the Thai side of the border.

The bombings were similar to the one in Hatyai at the Lee Gardens Plaza Hotel on 31 March 2012 where three people, including two Malaysians, were killed.

== See also ==
- South Thailand Insurgency topics
- 2012 Southern Thailand bombings
