= Thailand's Got Talent season 1 =

Thailand's Got Talent
- Season 1
- Hosted by: Krit SriBhumisret; Kathsepsawad Ayuthaya
- Judges: Pinyo Ruedhamma; Pornchita na Songkhla; Nirut Sirijanya
- Winner: Myra Maneepatsorn Molloy
- Runner-up: Somsuk Hemrun

Release
- Original network: THAITV CH3
- Original release: 6 March – 3 April 2011

Season chronology
- Next → Season 2

Thailand's Got Talent season 1 (also known as TGT) was the first season of the Thailand's Got Talent reality television series on the Channel 3 television network, and part of the global British Got Talent series. It is a talent show that features singers, dancers, sketch artists, comedians and other performers of all ages competing for the advertised top prize of 10,000,000 Baht (approximately $325,000). The show debuted in March 2011. Thailand is also the fifth country in Asia to license Got Talent series. The three judges Nirut Sirijanya, Benz Pomchita Na Songkla, and Pinyo Rutham join hosts Krit Sribhumisret and Ketsepsawat Palagawongse na Ayutthaya.

The winner of the first season was Myra Maneepatsorn Molloy, a 13-year- old singer, who took home the first place prize of 10,000,000 Baht (approximately $325,000).

== Format ==
=== Broadcast ===
- Audition for 5 weeks.
- Round 6 weeks.
- The final two weeks.
- The display is cut or not to broadcast will be released via the web. Site in the name. In Thailand gods of Morgan Lane West (Thailand's Got More Talent), as well as the original from England.

=== Pre-casting ===
- North on Nov 26-28 at the Lotus Hotel Pang Suan Kaew, Chiang Mai.
- Northeast on Dec 3-5 at Charoen Thani Princess in Khon Kaen.
- Central and Eastern on Dec 10-12 at the Bangkok Convention Centre at Central Plaza Lat Phrao, Bangkok.
- South on Dec 24-26 at the International Conference Centre. National celebrations every 60 years, Hat Yai, Songkhla.

=== Audition ===
In January 2011, at the theater Aksara King Power Complex and Work Point studio for 6 days broadcast on Sunday From March 6 to April 3, 2011, 5 at which this cycle is a cycle that will be aired on television in many ways. Countries that do not have an opponent from round to round of auditions for the 321 participants must show their ability to express themselves within 2–4 minutes, which shall have the right to stop. the display. If one third of the people when the Buzzer will stop immediately. The Committee is asked to press the buzzer to stop by any of the Board of Directors will consider the ability to sound at least two of three in the competition to determine who enters the next round or not. Then the tape shows a selection of the finalists of the last remaining 48 shows. Into the finals.

=== Semi-final ===
Finals will be broadcast live on the 48th of the last to audiences throughout the country for six weeks of studio work point. Pathum Thani province. Judging by the votes of the audience through SMS SMS during a live person with the most votes will automatically be finalists. For those who have votes in the first two, and three judges will decide who is qualified by a two-thirds, as well as the fairly steep in this part of the show is taped before a three-hour to an hour. First added to prevent mistakes. The announcement will be broadcast live.

== Semi-final summary ==
The "Number" columns lists the code of appearance each act made for every episode.

=== Semi-final 1 (10 April 2011) ===
Key	X Buzzed out	✔ Judges' choice	Won the public vote	Won the judges' vote	No. 2 or 3 of the vote but did not qualify

Number	Artist	Act	Buzzes and judges' choices		
Number	Artist	Act	Pinyo	Pornchita	Nirut
TGT01	The Zoo Thailand	Dance group			
TGT02	Narit Chumkeaw	Hand Shadow Arts	—	—	—
TGT03	Ganika Kianman	Sing a Song	✔	✔	✔
TGT04	Trongkeit Buasawan	Singing their own tune	X	—	X
TGT05	High Heel	Dance group	—	—	—
TGT06	Kasemcharin Kamsri	Sing a Song / Playing music	—	—	—
TGT07	Sorawit Chotsiripongkorn	Yoga Performance			
TGT08	Wipa Wongdee	Sing a Song	—	—	—

=== Semi-final 2 (17 April 2011) ===
Key	X Buzzed out	✔ Judges' choice	Won the public vote	Won the judges' vote	No. 2 or 3 of the vote but did not qualify

Number	Artist	Act	Buzzes and judges' choices		
Number	Artist	Act	Pinyo	Pornchita	Nirut
TGT09	SWAN	Acrobatic Dance Group			
TGT10	Nattakorn Tarworchart	Sing a Song	—	—	—
TGT11	Dragon Gym	Taekwondo dance music	—	—	—
TGT12	Pajaree Worapunpisit	Pole Dance	✔	✔	
TGT13	Watcharapol Kasikam	Sing a Song	—	—	—
TGT14	Kongkeit Kongjandee	Sand art			✔
TGT15	Anek Suksai	Sing a Song	X	X	X
TGT16	The Accidental	Choral singing	—	—	—

=== Semi-final 3 (24 April 2011) ===
Key	X Buzzed out	✔ Judges' choice	Won the public vote	Won the judges' vote	No. 2 or 3 of the vote but did not qualify

Number	Artist	Act	Buzzes and judges' choices		
Number	Artist	Act	Pinyo	Pornchita	Nirut
TGT17	Tongchai Mudphet	Singer	—	—	—
TGT18	Exotic Percussion	Tap the device to beat	—	—	—
TGT19	Nichakarn Poolsang	Sing a song	✔	✔	
TGT20	The Perfect Design	Dance group			✔
TGT21	Somsuk Hemrun	Play Guitar			
TGT22	Supannahong	Music played by Thai music mix	—	—	—
TGT23	Lu xia	Sing a song	—	—	—
TGT24	Wiriya Onjan	Break dancers	—	—	—

=== Semi-final 4 (1 May 2011) ===
Key	X Buzzed out	✔ Judges' choice	Won the public vote	Won the judges' vote	No. 2 or 3 of the vote but did not qualify

Number	Artist	Act	Buzzes and judges' choices		
Number	Artist	Act	Pinyo	Pornchita	Nirut
TGT25	BS CREW	Dance with the art of Muay Thai	—	—	—
TGT26	Methinee Baimuang	Sing a song	—	—	—
TGT27	TK ALLSTAR FREEZE	Dance B-boy	—	—	—
TGT28	Kidbuaksib	Thai Acting art with shadow			
TGT29	Nuntita Khampriranon	Sing a song		✔	✔
TGT30	HIGHER LEVEL	BATTLE Dance	—	—	—
TGT31	Satawat Tinjan	Sing a song	—	—	—
TGT32	Chayapa Pongsupacharkrit	Sing a song			

=== Semi-final 5 (8 May 2011) ===
Key	X Buzzed out	✔ Judges' choice	Won the public vote	Won the judges' vote	No. 2 or 3 of the vote but did not qualify

Number	Artist	Act	Buzzes and judges' choices		
Number	Artist	Act	Pinyo	Pornchita	Nirut
TGT33	S.O.S	Comedy / rap as a music device	—	—	—
TGT34	DOUBLE TAP	Beat box, double / double rap	—	—	—
TGT35	Maneepatsorn Molloy	Sing a song			
TGT36	Aongsasin	Drumming group	—	—	—
TGT37	Thammarat Lamprom	Comedy show	—	—	—
TGT38	Arreeya Rotejanadit	Sing a song			
TGT39	ULZZANG	Dance group	—	—	—
TGT40	Auj Kalayanakub	Saxophone player	✔	✔	✔

=== Semi-final 6 (15 May 2011) ===
Key	X Buzzed out	✔ Judges' choice	Won the public vote	Won the judges' vote	No. 2 or 3 of the vote but did not qualify

Number	Artist	Act	Buzzes and judges' choices		
Number	Artist	Act	Pinyo	Pornchita	Nirut
TGT41	VARIETY DANCE	Epingmag hit group	—	—	—
TGT42	Sompot Tongyuak	Dance club / playing with fire	✔		✔
TGT43	Kantinan Kriratijareannan	Sing a song	—	—	—
TGT44	Kongpob Kaewrueng	Sing a song/Play guitar			
TGT45	Muttapha Lasan	Single dance/comedy	—	—	—
TGT46	8 RIDAR MONKEY JUMP	Dance Group / X-Treme	—	—	—
TGT47	Prewar Ungkanavin	Sing a song		✔	
TGT48	CRAZY DRAGON	Dance group	—	—	—

==== Grand final ====
Final Round broadcast show of 12 Finalist and decision based on the public vote only

Number	contestant	performance	judge's buzzle			result
Number	contestant	performance	Pinyo	Pornchita	Nirut	result
TGT11	Maneepatsorn Molloy	Classical & Broadway Singer				Winner
TGT10	Somsuk Hemrun	One-Armed Guitarist sang "Satta"				1st Runner-Up
TGT12	Kidbuaksib	Thai Acting art with shadow				6 Finalist
TGT01	SWAN	Acrobatic Dance Group				6 Finalist
TGT06	Kongpob Kaewrueng	Music show (People with disabilities)				6 Finalist
TGT08	Nuntita Khampriranon	Sing a song (remix and sing by man & women voice)				6 Finalist
TGT02	Pajaree Worapunpisit	Pole Dancer				12 Finalist
TGT03	Ganika Kianman	Sing a Song				12 Finalist
TGT04	Sorawit Chotsiripongkorn	Yoga Performance				12 Finalist
TGT05	Nitchakarn Bunsang	Sing a song				12 Finalist
TGT07	Auj Kalayanakub	Saxophone player				12 Finalist
TGT09	Sompot Tongyuak	dance blackjack and Kghakr fire				12 Finalist

==== Rating ====
Episode	Date	Rating Sharing	Sorce
Auditions 1	6 March	6.4	
Auditions 1 2	13 March	8.2	
Auditions 1 3	20 March	8.9	
Auditions 1 4	27 March	12.4	
Auditions 1 5	3 April	10.5	
Semi-Finals 1	10 April	16.9	
Semi-Finals 2	17 April	13.2	
Semi-Finals 3	24 April	15.8	
Semi-Finals 4	1 May	21.1	
Semi-Finals 5	8 May	21.3	
Semi-Finals 6	15 May	21.4	
Final 1	22 May	19.2	
Results Final	29 May	15.6	
