= 2013 PTT Thailand Open – Doubles =

Doubles
- 2013 PTT Thailand Open

Final
- Champions: (United Kingdom) Jamie Murray (Australia) John Peers
- Runners-up: (Poland) Tomasz Bednarek (Sweden) Johan Brunström
- Score: 6–3, 3–6, [10–6]

Events
Singles	Doubles
- PTT Thailand Open

Lu Yen-hsun and Danai Udomchoke were the defending champions, but lost in the quarterfinals to Jamie Murray and John Peers.
Murray and Peers went on to win the title, defeating Tomasz Bednarek and Johan Brunström in the final, 6–3, 3–6, [10–6].

== Seeds ==
1. (India) Mahesh Bhupathi / (Sweden) Robert Lindstedt (first round)
2. (Italy) Daniele Bracciali / (India) Leander Paes (semifinals)
3. (United Kingdom) Jamie Murray / (Australia) John Peers (champions)
4. (Poland) Tomasz Bednarek / (Sweden) Johan Brunström (final)

== Draw ==
Key

- Q = Qualifier
- WC = Wild card
- LL = Lucky loser
- Alt = Alternate
- ITF = ITF entry
- PR = Protected ranking
- SR = Special ranking
- SE = Special exempt
- JE = Junior exempt
- JR = Junior Accelerator Programme entrant
- CO = College Accelerator Programme entrant
- NG = Next Gen Accelerator Program entrant
- w/o = Walkover
- r = Retired
- d = Defaulted

=== Draw ===
First round
1	(India) M Bhupathi (Sweden) R Lindstedt	6	3	[8]
(Spain) D Gimeno-Traver (Italy) P Lorenzi	2	6	[10]
WC	(Serbia) L Djere (Thailand) W Trongcharoenchaikul	4	3
(Germany) C Kas (Austria) O Marach	6	6
4	(Poland) T Bednarek (Sweden) J Brunström	6	7^{7}
(Russia) M Elgin (Uzbekistan) D Istomin	4	6^{5}
(Poland) M Kowalczyk (Slovakia) I Zelenay	2	6	[8]
(Thailand) Sa Ratiwatana (Thailand) So Ratiwatana	6	4	[10]
(Czech Republic) L Rosol (Netherlands) I Sijsling	6^{3}	7	[1]
WC	(Chinese Taipei) Y-h Lu (Thailand) D Udomchoke	7^{7}	5	[10]
(United States) N Monroe (Germany) S Stadler	6^{6}	4
3	(United Kingdom) J Murray (Australia) J Peers	7^{8}	6
(Colombia) JS Cabal (Colombia) R Farah	7	7
(India) P Raja (India) D Sharan	5	5
(United States) J Cerretani (Canada) A Shamasdin	5	6^{4}
2	(Italy) D Bracciali (India) L Paes	7	7^{7}

Quarterfinals
(Spain) D Gimeno-Traver (Italy) P Lorenzi	4	4
(Germany) C Kas (Austria) O Marach	6	6
4	(Poland) T Bednarek (Sweden) J Brunström	7	6
(Thailand) Sa Ratiwatana (Thailand) So Ratiwatana	5	3
WC	(Chinese Taipei) Y-h Lu (Thailand) D Udomchoke	6^{7}	5
3	(United Kingdom) J Murray (Australia) J Peers	7^{9}	7
(Colombia) JS Cabal (Colombia) R Farah	7^{7}	6^{8}	[8]
2	(Italy) D Bracciali (India) L Paes	6^{4}	7^{10}	[10]

Semifinals
(Germany) C Kas (Austria) O Marach	3	3
4	(Poland) T Bednarek (Sweden) J Brunström	6	6
3	(United Kingdom) J Murray (Australia) J Peers	6	6
2	(Italy) D Bracciali (India) L Paes	3	4

Final
4	(Poland) T Bednarek (Sweden) J Brunström	3	6	[6]
3	(United Kingdom) J Murray (Australia) J Peers	6	3	[10]
