= Killing of Chaiyaphum Pasae =

Chaiyaphum Pasae (Thai: ชัยภูมิ ป่าแส) was a teenage Lahu human rights activist from Thailand who worked on promoting minority ethnic group rights. He was killed at a military checkpoint in Chiang Dao District of Chiang Mai Province by army soldiers on 17 March 2017. The army insisted that Chaiyaphum had been found trafficking drugs, and was killed by soldiers in self-defence after brandishing a grenade and trying to escape custody. However, eyewitness accounts stated that he was unarmed, and was beaten before being shot. The killing sparked disbelief in Thailand, and the Human Rights Watch issued a statement calling for the case to be transparently investigated. Despite claiming that their version of events was supported by CCTV footage, the military has so far refused to release the video footage to the public.

== Killing ==
At 11:00 on 17 March, 2017, Chaiyaphum was shot dead at the Ban Rin Luang checkpoint in Mueang Na Sub-district, Chiang Dao District, Chiang Mai Province. Chaiyaphum, in a car driven by his friend, Pongsanai Sangtala, was stopped by soldiers near the Thai-Myanmar border to conduct a search. The soldiers claimed they found 2,800 methamphetamine pills in the car's air cleaner. They alleged that Chaiyaphum brandished a knife, attempted to escape, and tried to throw a hand grenade at the soldiers. One of the soldiers opened fire in self-defence. Chaiyaphum died at the scene. One month before Chaiyaphoum's death, another Lahu man was stopped at the same checkpoint, accused of possessing drugs, allegedly assaulted officials, and tried to escape. He, like Chaiyaphoum, was shot dead. Despite the presence of seven CCTV camera in the vicinity of the checkpoint, the details of his death remain a mystery.

In an interview with Thai PBS an eyewitness said that Chaiyaphum was dragged from the car, beaten, and summarily shot dead. "A lot of villagers saw that he was dragged from his car. He was beaten and his face was stepped on. Two warning shots were fired. When he got free from the soldiers beating him, he ran off. When he ran off, they shot him dead. They did not let villagers get near the scene," he said.

=== Investigation ===
On 20 March, the soldier who shot Chaiyaphum reported to the local police. On the 24th, the army gave a disk drive of CCTV footage to the Royal Thai Police. The police claimed they could not find the incident footage on the disk.

On 23 March, the 3rd Region Army chief, Lt Gen Vijak Siribansop, claimed that Chaiyaphum was involved in drug trafficking. He said that he had watched the CCTV footage and added that, if he had been there, he might have fired his M16 on full-automatic rather than just single shot mode. Vijak also stated that the CCTV footage would not be shown publicly as it would be evidence in court. The video was reviewed by army chief General Chalermchai Sitthisad also, who noted that it "didn't answer all the questions".

On 25 April, the army sent the hard disk and the recording device to the police instead of sending a copy on CD. The hard disk was sealed with signed duct tape and sent to the Central Police Forensic Science Division. However, on 18 May, Chaiyaphum's lawyer stated that the public prosecutor had not received the CCTV footage.

On 29 May, authorities arrested Chaiyaphum's relatives for drug offences after they criticised the case. Police arrested Chaiyaphum's sister-in-law, Chantana Pasae, and his adopted brother's sister-in-law, Nawa Ja-eu, claiming that they were the ones who gave Chaiyaphum the drugs he was carrying when killed.

=== Trial ===
On 5 July, the Chiang Mai Provincial Court bean hearing testimony despite the absence of CCTV evidence. On 4 September, the first round of witness interrogation was held in court. From 13-16 March, 2018, the second round of witness interrogations were held. Eight witnesses from the army gave testimony to the court along with two witnesses from the Chaiyaphum family.

On 14 March, Sumitchai Hattasan, one of the lawyers representing Chaiyaphum, informed the media that the Central Police Forensic Science Division report was presented during the inquest. The report noted that footage from 17 March 2017 was not found on a hard disk. Sumitchai said that the forensic officer confirmed that the video camera was working properly. Sumitchai asked for the court's approval to demand the footage from the army, but this was rejected, with the court claiming that the existing witnesses and evidence were sufficient to finish the inquest. Sumitchai reported that the forensic results presented during the inquest on 14 March show no Chaiyaphum fingerprints on the knife that the soldiers accused him of wielding. The report also showed that one of the many people whose DNA was found on the body of the grenade, not the pin, was Chaiyaphum's.

On 23 March, the Thai prime minister, Prayut Chan-o-cha, ordered an army probe into the killing. The army set up a committee.

=== Ruling ===
On 6 June, the Chiang Mai Provincial Court ruleed on the extrajudicial killing case of Chaiyaphum Pasae. The court ruled that the bullet that killed Chaiyaphum was fired by the authorities. The court refused to consider arguments made by Chaiyaphum's relatives that claimed that he did not possess drugs or hand grenades, nor did he attempt to stab officials. The judge said that the court was only asked to determine the cause of death. The findings of the inquest will be submitted to the public prosecutor to determine if charges should be filed. Later, on 18 Jun 2018, Rassada Manurassada, the lawyer for the Chaiyaphum family, asked the army to disclose CCTV footage of the extrajudicial killing under the 1997 Information Act.

In a letter sent to the family's lawyers on 10 August, the army said that a video of the incident did not exist. Army and local police investigators checked the hard disk of the camera together and found that the footage had been taped over due to a lack of space. A provincial police commander told reporters the police never touched the hard disk. Deputy Chiang Mai Police Chief Mongkol Samphawapol said in a 13 May 2017 news conference that the disk was sealed and sent to the forensics department for inspection. The head of that department, Maj. Gen. Thawatchai Mekprasertsuk, told Khaosod English later on the month that they were unable to see what was on the disk drive because they did not have the right software to open the file.
