= 2013 Thailand refugee camp fire =

Burmese refugee camp conflagration

2013 Thailand camp fire
- Ban Mae Surin (Thailand)
- Date: 22 March 2013
- Time: 09:00 GMT
- Location: Ban Mae Surin refugee camp, Mae Hong Son Province, Thailand
- Deaths: 37
- Injuries: 200
- Property damage: 300–400 huts destroyed 2,300 people without shelter

On 22 March 2013, a fire at the Ban Mae Surin refugee camp in Mae Hong Son Province, Thailand, killed 37 Karen refugees from neighbouring Myanmar, as well as destroying hundreds of dwellings. Thought to have started following a "cooking accident", the fire began at around 16:00 local time (09:00 GMT), and extinguished around two hours later. The fire had been spread by hot weather combined with strong winds.

The current death toll for the fire is 37, comprising 21 men and 16 women. Of these, 35 were killed directly, while two others died in the following days. The majority of victims were burned to death, while others were suffocated. The death toll had previously been reported to be as high as 62, though this was later revised. Various sources have also reported "at least 100" and "over 200" other injured people.

The fire destroyed hundreds of makeshift bamboo huts at the camp, as well as the camp's medical clinic, hospital, and two food warehouses. At least 2,300 people were left without shelter following the fire, and were subsequently accommodated in tents. Food, shelter, and clothing is being provided by the International Rescue Committee, the United Nations High Commissioner for Refugees, the Jesuit Refugee Service, and the International Organization for Migration, as well as other aid groups.

== Controversy ==
Eyewitnesses claim they saw a helicopter or airplane pass several times overhead before dropping 'sparks' onto the roofs of one of the sources of the fires. The investigation found traces of phosphorus at the source of the fire, leading a police chief to claim it was not an accident. The fire started simultaneously in Zone 1 and Zone 4, on opposite ends of the camps, leading some to suspect foul play Additionally, a section leader in the camp reported that two living tents far from camp were simultaneously burned, leading the community to further suspect foul play.
