= 2012 Southern Thailand bombings =

Terrorist incident in Thailand

- Part of the South Thailand insurgency
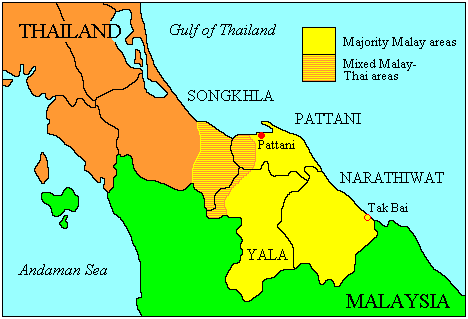
- Location: Hat Yai, Songkhla, Thailand
- Date: 31 March 2012 (UTC+7)
- Target: Various
- Attack type: Multiple vehicle bombings
- Deaths: 16
- Injuries: 321 estimated
- Perpetrator: possibly Pattani insurgents

The 2012 Southern Thailand bombings were a series of bombings that took place in Yala, Yala Province and in Hat Yai, Songkhla Province, on 31 March 2012.

== Attacks ==
=== Yala ===
The first attack involved a truck bomb that ripped through a busy shopping district in Yala. About 20 minutes later, a second bomb planted in a motorcycle exploded as rescuers convened at the site of the original bombing. Later, a third explosion from a device placed in a car set fire to nearby buildings. About 11 people were killed and 110 wounded by the blasts, with the second explosion causing a majority of casualties.

=== Hat Yai ===
Following the bombings in Songkhla, an explosion in the basement of the Lee Gardens Plaza Hotel damaged that building and an adjacent McDonald's in Hat Yai, killing at least four and leaving 416 wounded, mainly from smoke inhalation. It was first reported to be the cause of a gas leak but later was attributed to a car bomb. The bombing was regarded by some sources as an escalation in the insurgency because its target was a hotel popular with tourists from Malaysia and Singapore.

== Suspects ==
The attacks have been regarded by most major news outlets as part of the broader South Thailand insurgency. While no terrorist organisation took responsibility for the bombings, the most likely culprit is the Gerakan Mujahidin Islam Patani (GMIP) separatist movement, which is a splinter group of the Gerakan Mujahidin Pattani.

According to security sources, Sahudin Tohjehmae was suspected to carry out the three bomb attacks with the help of Saifulloh Sahfru, a terrorist suspect who is a friend of Faisol Hayisama-ae, who was suspected of carrying out the bomb attack at Hat Yai International Airport in 2005.

== See also ==
- South Thailand insurgency
