= 2023 in Thailand =

- Decades: 2000s; 2010s; 2020s
- See also: Other events of 2023; Timeline of Thai history

Following is a list of events and scheduled events in the year 2023 in Thailand. The year 2023 is the 242nd year of the Rattanakosin Kingdom of Thailand. It was the eighth year in the reign of King Vajiralongkorn (Rama X), and is reckoned as year 2566 in the Buddhist Era, the Thai calendar.

Thai politics in 2023 was marked by the 2023 general election in July, which saw the progressive Move Forward party, along with 7 other parties it formed a coalition with, win the election against pro-junta parties. However its leader, Pita Limjaroenrat, failed to secure enough votes from Parliament and was later suspended. Pheu Thai currently seeks to nominate its candidate as prime minister.

== Incumbents ==
- King: Vajiralongkorn
- Prime Minister:
  - Prayut Chan-o-cha (until 22 August)
  - Srettha Thavisin (since 22 August)
- Supreme Patriarch: Ariyavongsagatanana (Amborn Ambaro)

== Events ==
=== January ===
- 7 January – Jack Ma made a visit to Bangkok following his trip to Japan in late 2022 and his disappearance from the public.
- 10 January – Prime Minister Prayut Chan-o-cha leaves the Palang Pracharath party and joins the United Thai Nation party.
- 12 January – Thailand records its lowest birth rate in 71 years.
- 18 January – Two youth political activists began hunger strike from prison calling for the release of political prisoners, judicial reform and abolition of lèse-majesté law, which would last for 52 days.
- 26 January – The Sports Authority of Thailand announces that the 2025 Southeast Asian Games will be held in Bangkok, Chonburi and Songkhla.

=== February ===
- 17 February – It is revealed that Thailand's GDP in 2022 expanded 2.6 percent, which was among the slowest growth in Southeast Asia.
- 19 February – The Prayut cabinet pass an executive order to postpone provisions in the law against torture and forced disappearances.
- 20 February - The Maesai-Tachileik border checkpoint in Chiang Rai province between Myanmar and Thailand reopens after its closure on 24 March 2020.

=== March ===
- 5 March – Health officials reported that over 1.3 million people in Thailand had been affected by air pollution-related diseases, mainly caused by PM2.5 dust.
- 10 March – A radioactive Caesium-137 container was reported missing from a power plant in Prachin Buri Province. It was later found melted and the environment was contaminated with radiation.
- 15 March – Personal data of 55 million Thais, presumed to be leaked from a government agency, was posted for sale by hackers.
- 20 March – Decree to dissolve the House of Representatives took effect.
- 21 March –
  - The Akara gold mine or Chatree gold mine was reopened after Prayut Chan-o-cha ordered its suspension in 2017 and the government was expected to lose the international arbitration case.
  - Three new cases of mpox are discovered in Thailand.
- 22 March – Mass shooting occurred in Petchaburi Province, causing at least three deaths.

=== May ===
- 14 May – The 2023 Thai general election was held. The pro-democratic, progressive Move Forward Party wins the highest number of votes and seats. Its coalition with other anti-junta parties such as Pheu Thai wins the majority of seats while pro-junta parties such as United Thai Nation and Palang Pracharat lose seats.

=== July ===
- 11 July – Two people are killed and eleven others are injured when an elevated road collapses in Bangkok.
- 19 July – A Thai court suspends politician and winner of the 2023 Thai general election Pita Limjaroenrat's status as a lawmaker after accusing him of violating election laws for allegedly holding shares in a media company.
- 25 July – Parliament postpones the third round of parliamentary votes to select a Prime-minister from July 27. In response, protests around Bangkok erupted against Senators.

=== August ===
- 11 August – Thailand witnesses its first Mpox related death. At this point, Bangkok had 136 cases of Mpox.
- 22 August –
  - Srettha Thavisin of the Pheu Thai party is elected by Parliament to become the 30th Prime-Minister of Thailand. Pheu Thai-led coalition also included junta-affiliated parties: the Palang Pracharath and the United Thai Nation.
  - Thaksin Shinawatra returns to Thailand after his last return in 2008.

=== September ===
- 1 September – King Vajiralongkorn grants Thaksin a royal pardon, reducing his jail term to a year.
- 19 September – Si Thep Historical Park was recognized as a UNESCO World Cultural Heritage Site.
- 25 September – The 5-month visa waiver program to Chinese tourists went into effect. The first Chinese tourists were received in a VIP welcome.
- 26 September – Thai pro-democracy activist Arnon Nampa, who led the 2020 protests, is sentenced to four years in prison on a charge of royal insult.
- 27 September – Police General Torsak Sukwimon, who had ties to the King, was named the national police commander amid crackdown on fellow high-ranking officer Police General Surachet Hakphan.

=== October ===
- 3 October – Siam Paragon shooting: Two people are killed and five more injured during a mass shooting at the Siam Paragon shopping mall in Bangkok. The 14-year-old suspect has been arrested.
- 9 October – Thailand Earth Observation Satellite 2 (THEOS-2) is launched into space from French Guiana.

=== December ===
- 3 December-Amazing Thailand Marathon Bangkok
- 15 December – State prosecutors in Thailand indict a member of the country’s Senate, Upakit Pachariyangkun, on six charges involving narcotics trafficking, money laundering and association with a transnational criminal organization.
- 16 December – Fifteen suspected drug smugglers are killed and about 2 million methamphetamine tablets are seized during a shootout with soldiers at Thailand's border with Myanmar.

=== Ongoing events ===
- COVID-19 pandemic in Thailand

== Deaths ==
=== January ===
- 11 January -Eli Ostreicher, British-American entrepreneur (born 1983)

=== February ===
- 5 February – Nukun Prachuapmo, politician, minister of transport (1991–1992, 1992).

=== August ===
- 14 August - Petch Osathanugrah, businessman and singer-songwriter.

=== September ===
- 3 September - Thalerngsak Nuchpraphan, then current Deputy Governor of Phang Nga.
