= 2022 in Thailand =

- Decades: 2000s; 2010s; 2020s; 2030s
- See also: Other events of 2022; Timeline of Thai history

The year 2022 is the 241st year of the Rattanakosin Kingdom of Thailand. It is the seventh year in the reign of King Vajiralongkorn (Rama X), and is reckoned as year 2565 in the Buddhist Era. The year was marked by anticipated APEC meetings, the first Bangkok governor election after the 2014 coup, and rising inflation following the COVID-19 pandemic in the country.

== Incumbents ==
- King: Vajiralongkorn
- Prime Minister: Prayut Chan-o-cha
- Supreme Patriarch: Ariyavongsagatanana (Amborn Ambaro)

== Events ==
=== Ongoing events ===
- COVID-19 pandemic in Thailand

=== January–March ===
- Early January – Pork prices in Thailand's wet markets rose to 210-250 Bahts per kilogramme, the highest in years.
- 10 January – Park rangers at Thong Pha Phum National Park in Kanchanaburi discovered 2 Tiger carcasses at a campsite in the park.
- 16 January
  - COVID-19 pandemic in Thailand: Thailand reported its first death from Omicron variant.
  - By-elections were held at Songkhla and Chumphon, with the Democrat party gaining victory in both provinces.
- 25 January – Thailand's Prime Minister made an official 2-day visit to Saudi Arabia at the invitation of the Crown Prince of Saudi Arabia, marking the first high-level visit between the 2 countries in three decades
- 30 January – By-elections were held in Bangkok's 9th constituency (Lak Si - Chatuchak), with the Pheu Thai Party victorious.

=== April–June ===
- 22 May – Chadchart Sittipunt, former Transport minister, won the 2022 Bangkok gubernatorial election.

=== July–September ===
- 5 August – Mountain B nightclub fire
- 24 August – Prayut Chan-o-cha was suspended from prime ministerial duties by the Constitutional Court of Thailand while it considered legal challenges on his term limit.
- 30 September – The Constitutional Court ruled that the eight-year term limit for Prayut's premiership dates from the promulgation of the 2017 constitution and not his assumption of the position after the 2014 coup.

=== October–December ===
- 6 October - 2022 Nong Bua Lamphu massacre
- 16–19 November - APEC Summit 2022
- 19 December – Sinking of the Royal Thai Navy HTMS Sukhothai with 106 crew aboard, 31 missing.
- 30 December - A man is arrested for driving a stolen Royal Thai Armed Forces bus to Suvarnabhumi airport.

== Deaths ==
=== January ===
- 8 January – Sornphet Sornsuphan, Luk Thung singer
- 12 January – Waiphot Phetsuphan, Luk Thung singer
- 31 January – Vicharnnoi Porntawee, Muay Thai kickboxer

=== February ===
- 10 February – Joseph Surasarang, Roman Catholic prelate, bishop of Chiang Mai (1987–2009)
- 24 February – Nida Patcharaveerapong, actress
- 28 February – Bhichai Rattakul, politician, minister of foreign affairs (1975, 1976) and twice deputy prime minister

=== March ===
- 7 March – Berkrerk Chartvanchai, boxer, WBA flyweight champion (1970)
- 10 March – Sorapong Chatree, actor (Out of the Darkness, Plae Kao, The Legend of Suriyothai)

=== May ===
- 4 May – Charoen Khanthawong, politician, MP (1975–2014)

=== June ===
- 28 June – Kaiwan Wattanakrai, voice actor

=== July ===
- 23 July – Prince Bhisadej Rajani, royal

=== August ===
- 18 August – Sombat Metanee, actor (Sugar Is Not Sweet, Tears of the Black Tiger) and politician, MP (2006–2007)

=== September ===
- 8 September – Pinya Chuayplod, politician, MP (1979–1992), senator (2000–2006)
- 23 September – Marut Bunnag, politician, speaker of the House of Representatives (1992–1995)
