= 2018 in Thailand =

- Decades: 1990s; 2000s; 2010s; 2020s
- See also: Other events of 2018; Timeline of Thai history

The year 2018 was the 237th year of the Rattanakosin Kingdom of Thailand. It was the 3rd year in the reign of King Vajiralongkorn (Rama X), and was the year 2561 in the Buddhist Era.

== Incumbents ==
- King: Vajiralongkorn
- Prime Minister: Prayut Chan-o-cha
- Supreme Patriarch: Ariyavongsagatanana VIII

== Events ==
- 29 April – Protesters rally against a housing project for Ministry of Justice government officials in Chiang Mai, which was seen as encroaching on forest land.
- 22 May – Protests against the military rule mark the fourth anniversary of the 2014 Thai coup d'état.
- 18 June – Thailand executes a prisoner convicted of murder in its first execution in nine years and the man was the country's seventh person to be executed by means of lethal injection.
- 23 June onwards – Tham Luang cave rescue
- 5 July – 2018 Phuket boat capsizing
- 17 December – Miss Universe 2018

== Deaths ==
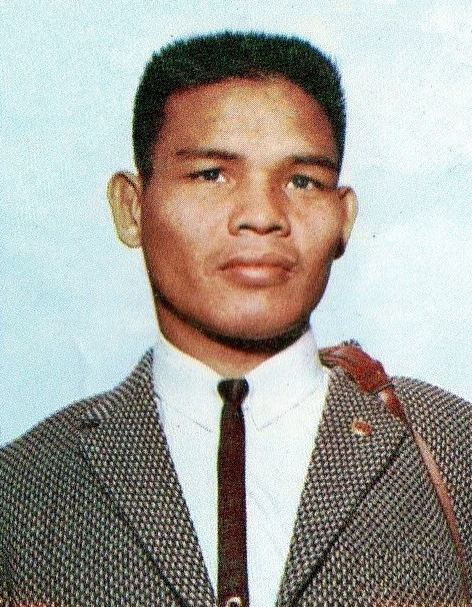
Chartchai Chionoi

- 21 January – Chartchai Chionoi, boxer, WBC world champion and WBA world champion in flyweight (b. 1942).
- 6 July – Saman Gunan, diver, participant in Tham Luang cave rescue.
- 6 August – Nat Indrapana, IOC Member in Thailand.
- 27 October – Vichai Srivaddhanaprabha, 60, duty-free retailer (King Power) and football club owner Leicester City), helicopter crash.
