= 2024 in Thailand =

- Decades: 2000s; 2010s; 2020s; 2030s
- See also: Other events of 2024; Timeline of Thai history

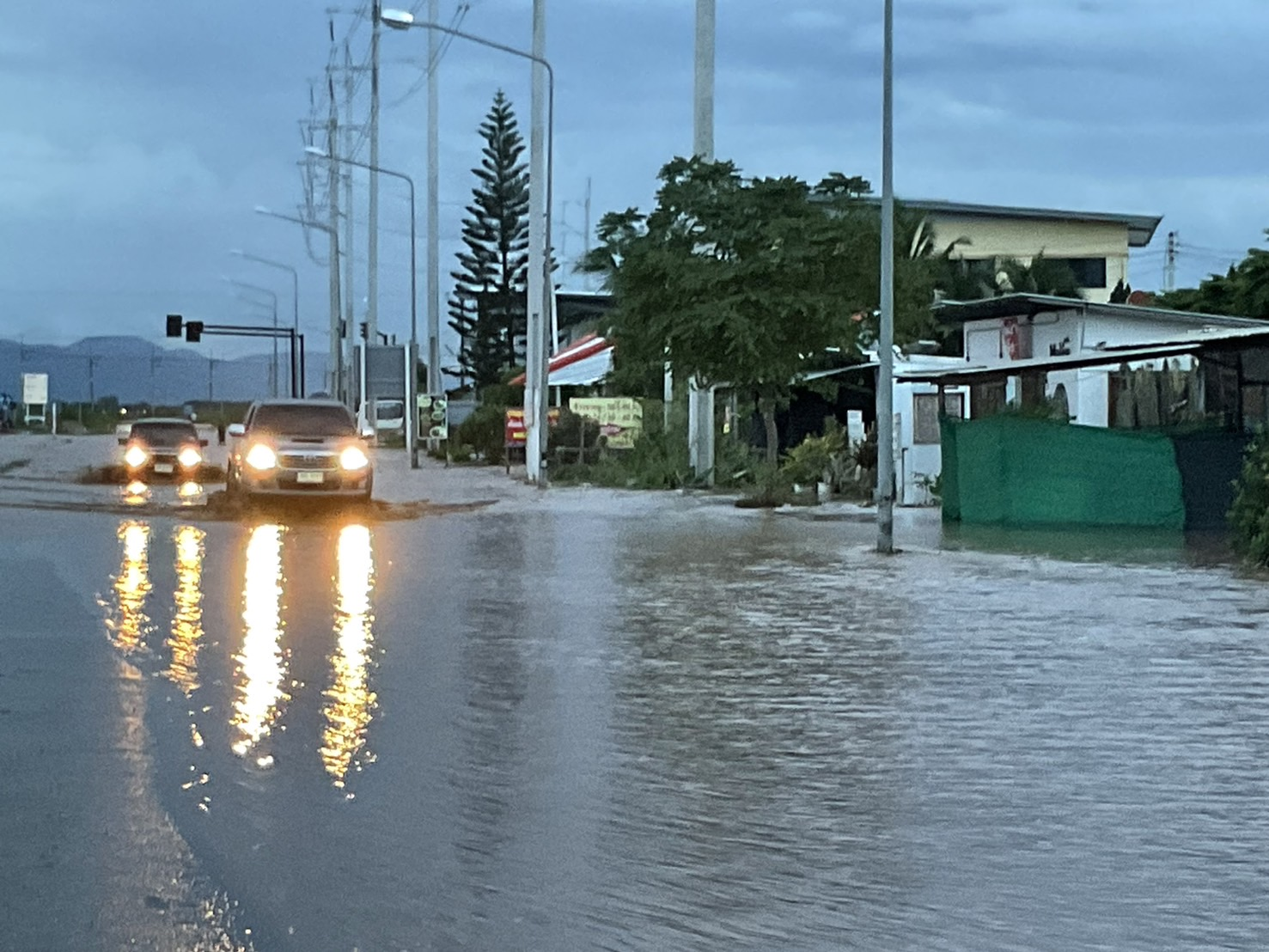

Following is a list of events and scheduled events in the year 2024 in Thailand. The year 2024 is the 243rd year of the Rattanakosin Kingdom of Thailand. It was the ninth year in the reign of King Vajiralongkorn (Rama X), and reckoned as year 2567 in the Buddhist Era, the Thai calendar.

== Incumbents ==
- King: Vajiralongkorn
- Prime Minister:

Srettha Thavisin (until 14 August)
Phumtham Wechayachai (acting; 14-16 August)
Paetongtarn Shinawatra (since 16 August)

- Supreme Patriarch: Ariyavongsagatanana (Amborn Ambaro)
- President of the National Assembly: Wan Muhamad Noor Matha (Prachachat)
- House of Representatives: 26th
- Senate: 12th (until 10 July); 13th (since 10 July)

== Events ==
=== January ===
- 10 January:
  - Dinosaur footprints dating from between 220 to 225 million years old are discovered in Phetchabun province.
  - The Royal Phuket Marina becomes the first and only carbon-neutral marina in Asia.
- 11 January - Niti Vivatvanich, who was appointed Governor of Prachuap Khiri Khan Province on 19 December 2023 dies of a heart attack.
- 16 January – The Thai cabinet approves a 1 baht per litre cut on the diesel tax, which will last until the end of April.
- 17 January:
  - Around 15 to 23 people are killed during a fatal explosion at a fireworks factory in Suphan Buri.
  - Activist Arnon Nampa is sentenced to four years in prison for a 2021 royal insult on social media.
  - MP and Secretary-General of the Bhumjaithai Party, Saksayam Chidchob, is found guilty by the Constitutional Court of concealing his stakes in a company and resigns from his political positions.
- 18 January – Thailand halts the import of poultry products from Belgium and three French regions to prevent the spread of Avian influenza.
- 20 January:
  - The leader of a credit card theft gang who stole ฿8 million in a month is arrested.
  - A train going from Bangkok to Chiang Mai collides with a truck carrying a backhoe at a crossing near Chum Saeng district, Nakhon Sawan province, killing the train driver and injuring five people.
- 23 January – Sa Kaeo province introduces a 10 pm curfew for minors aged under 15 following the murder of a 47-year old on 11 January by five minors.
- 24 January:
  - The Constitutional Court of Thailand acquits former Move Forward Party leader Pita Limjaroenrat in the owning of shares in the defunct media company iTV, paving the way for his resumption as a Member of the House of Representatives.
  - German President Frank-Walter Steinmeier begins his two day state visit to Thailand, the first state visit by a German president in 22 years.
- 31 January: The Constitutional Court rules that the Move Forward Party and its leaders, including Pita, violated the constitution through its aim to amend Thailand's lèse-majesté. The court also orders the party to end their campaign to amend the law.

=== February ===
- 1 February:
  - Former senator Ruangkrai Leekitwattana submits a petition to the Election Commission to disband the Move Forward Party.
  - The National Astronomical Research Institute of Thailand announces the discovery of 13 low-mass galaxies via the James Webb Space Telescope.
  - Belarusian rock band Bi-2 leaves Thailand for Israel after being arrested on 30 January amid fears of deportation to Russia.
- 2 February: UNESCO certifies Songkran as part of humanity's intangible cultural heritage list.
- 7 February:
  - The Thai government and Muslim separatists from the southern part of the country agree on a possible peace process to stop an insurrection which started in 2004.
  - Cambodian Prime Minister Hun Manet visits Thailand to sign several documents on further cooperation between Cambodia and Thailand.
- 8 February: Nualphan Lamsam (a.k.a. "Madame Pang") is elected as the first female president of Football Association of Thailand
- 18 February: Former Prime Minister Thaksin Shinawatra is released on parole after spending six weeks in a Bangkok hospital on the account of his age and health.

=== March ===
- 4 March:
  - Former Prime Minister Yingluck Shinawatra is acquitted by the Supreme Court on charges of corruption over a 2013 campaign to promote her government's infrastructure projects involving allegations of mishandling 240 billion baht ($6.7 billion) and failure to conduct proper bidding processes.
  - The Thai police force informs the family of activist Chaiyaphum Pasae that they will not hold the soldiers responsible for his murder at an army checkpoint. The admission comes three years after the government's decision to not charge the soldiers.
- 20 March: The head of the Royal Thai Police, Torsak Sukvimol, and one of his deputies, Surachate Hakparn are suspended by Prime Minister Srettha Thavisin as part of an investigation into Surachate's alleged involvement in illegal online gambling.
- 27 March: The House of Representatives approves a bill to legalize same-sex marriage by a vote of 400 to 10, with five abstentions.

=== April ===
- 12 April – Hundreds of refugees cross into Thailand from Myanmar after the fall of Myawaddy to ethnic armed organizations.
- 29 April – Parnpree Bahiddha-nukara resigns as foreign minister shortly after being removed as concurrent deputy prime minister in a cabinet reshuffle.

=== May ===
- 8 May – Thailand moves to recriminalize cannabis.
- 9 May – One person is killed and four others are injured following a fire at a chemical storage tank inside the Map Ta Phut Industrial Estate in Rayong Province.
- 14 May – Netiporn Sanesangkhom, an activist charged with lèse-majesté, dies in detention after staging a months-long hunger strike calling for reform of the justice system and an end to the persecution of political dissidents.
- 21 May – Singapore Airlines Flight 321: A Singapore Airlines flight from London to Singapore makes an emergency landing at Bangkok's Suvarnabhumi Airport after experiencing severe air turbulence over Myanmar, resulting in one death and at least 104 injured.
- 27 May – A court in Pathum Thani Province sentences Move Forward Party MP Chonthicha Jaengraew to two years imprisonment for lèse-majesté.

=== June ===
- 11 June – More than 1,000 animals are killed in a fire that destroys the pet section of the Chatuchak Weekend Market in Bangkok.
- 18 June –
  - The Senate votes 130-4 to legalise same-sex marriage, making Thailand the first country in Southeast Asia to approve the measure.
  - Former prime minister Thaksin Shinawatra is indicted on charges of lèse-majesté.
- 26 June – Final/National round of the 2024 Thai Senate election

=== July ===
- 10 July - Moo Deng, a pygmy hippopotamus, is born at the Khao Kheow Open Zoo in Si Racha. In September, she became a popular internet meme.
- 15 July – Thailand grants 60-day visa free access to nationals of 93 countries.
- 16 July – Six Vietnamese nationals are found dead from suspected poisoning at the Grand Hyatt Erawan hotel in Bangkok.
- 23 July – Senators meet to elect the chamber's president. The result indicates that Bhumjaithai Party-affiliated members dominate the chamber.

=== August ===
- 7 August – The Constitutional Court of Thailand orders the dissolution of the Move Forward Party for violating lèse-majesté provisions in the Constitution. It also bans the members of the party's executive board, including party leaders Pita Limjaroenrat and Chaithawat Tulathon, from standing for political office for 10 years.
- 9 August – Members of the dissolved Move Forward Party announce their regrouping in Parliament under the new People's Party.
- 14 August – Prime Minister Srettha Thavisin is dismissed by the Constitutional Court of Thailand for appointing Pichit Chuenban to his cabinet despite the latter having had a prior criminal conviction.
- 16 August – Paetongtarn Shinawatra becomes the youngest person, the second woman and the third member of the Shinawatra family to become Prime Minister of Thailand.
- 17 August – Former Prime Minister Thaksin Shinawatra receives a pardon from King Vajiralongkorn on the occasion of the latter's birthday.
- 21 August – Thailand reports its first case of clade 1b mpox in a 66-year-old European man who works in one of the African countries with the ongoing epidemic.
- 22 August – Thai Flying Service Flight 209 crashes in Chachoengsao province, killing all nine people on board.
- 25 August – Thirteen people are killed and 20 others are injured in a mudslide near the Big Buddha in Phuket.
- 29 August – Somyot Poompanmoung, the former commander of the Royal Thai Police, is indicted along with seven others for their role in tampering with evidence related to the death of Wichian Klanprasert.
- 24 August – Three foreign workers are killed in the collapse of a tunnel being built as part of the Bangkok–Nong Khai high-speed railway in Pak Chong district, Nakhon Ratchasima province.

=== September ===
- 13 September – At least ten people are killed by flooding and landslides caused by Typhoon Yagi across Thailand.
- 24 September – King Vajiralongkorn signs the same-sex bill into law, allowing same-sex marriages to be held in Thailand beginning in 2025.
- 25 September - Phrase 1 of the digital wallet scheme is launched, providing 14.5 million people with ฿10,000 handouts.
- 30 September – The Bangkok Criminal Court orders the extradition of Y Quynh Bđăp, a Montagnard activist convicted in absentia in Vietnam of terrorism charges over his role in the 2023 Đắk Lắk attacks.

=== October ===
- 1 October – A bus carrying students crashes into a highway barrier before catching fire near Bangkok, killing at least 23 people and injuring 16 others.
- 7 October – Three people are reported killed following days of flooding and landslides in the Chiang Mai area.
- 28 October – The Narathiwat Provincial Court dismisses charges against security officials implicated in the deaths of Muslim protesters during the Tak Bai incident in 2004, citing the expiration of a 20-year statute of limitations and failure to arrest the seven suspects.

=== November ===
- 7 November – A Thai woman is acquitted of involvement in the 2015 Bangkok bombing due to insufficient evidence.
- 20 November – Sararat Rangsiwuthaporn is sentenced to death for the fatal poisoning of 14 acquaintances as part of the Am Cyanide case.
- 27 November – Three people are killed in a shooting in Sri Boonrueang, Nong Bua Lamphu province.
- 30 November – One fisherman is drowned and another 31 are detained after Myanmar patrol boats open fire to three Thai fishing vessels off the coast of Ranong province.

=== December ===
- 4 December
  - At least 29 people are reported killed while more than 33,000 are displaced following days of flooding in five southern provinces.
  - UNESCO adds tom yum kung and kebaya to its intangible cultural heritage list.
- 8 December – Police arrest 124 people for holding a narcotics-fueled party at a hotel room in Bangkok.
- 13 December – Three people are killed in a bomb attack on a festival ground in Umphang district, Tak province.
- 29 December – Three foreign nationals are killed in a fire at a hotel in Khao San Road, Bangkok.

== Art and entertainment ==
- List of 2024 box office number-one films in Thailand
- List of Thai submissions for the Academy Award for Best International Feature Film

== Holidays ==
- 1–2 January – New Year's Day
- 10 February – Chinese New Year
- 24, 26 February – Makha Bucha Day
- 6, 8 April – Chakri Memorial Day
- 10 April – Hari Raya Puasa
- 13–16 April – Songkran Festival
- 1 May – Labour Day
- 4, 6 May – Coronation of King Vajiralongkorn Holiday
- 13 May – Royal Ploughing Ceremony
- 22 May – Visakha Bucha Day
- 3 June – Queen Suthida's Birthday
- 20 July – Asahna Bucha Day
- 28, 29 July – King Vajiralongkorn's Birthday
- 12 August – The Queen Mother's Birthday
- 13, 14 October – King Bhumibol Adulyadej Memorial Day
- 23 October – Chulalongkorn Memorial Day
- 5 December – King Bhumibol Adulyadej's Birthday
- 10 December – Constitution Day
- 25 December – Christmas Day
- 31 December – New Year's Eve
