= Rangsiman Rome =

Thai politician (born 1992)

- รังสิมันต์ โรม

Member of the House of Representatives
- Incumbent
- Assumed office March 24, 2019
- Constituency: Party-list (Future Forward) (2019–2020); Party-list (Move Forward) (2020–2024); Party-list (People's) (2026-present)

Spokesperson of Move Forward Party
- In office 30 April 2022 – 23 July 2023
- Preceded by: Wiroj Lakkhanaadisorn
- Succeeded by: Parit Wacharasindhu

Personal details
- Born: 31 May 1992 (age 34) Phuket, Thailand
- Party: People's Party (2024–present)
- Other political affiliations: Future Forward (2018–2020); Move Forward (2020–2024)
- Spouse: Ivana Kurniawati
- Education: Thammasat University
- Profession: Politician; activist

Rangsiman Rome (Thai: รังสิมันต์ โรม; born 31 May 1992), nicknamed Bai Phlu (Thai: ใบพลู), is a Thai politician and activist. He currently serves as a member of Thailand's House of Representatives and the People's Party's deputy chief. He also served as the former spokesperson of the Move Forward Party.

== Early life and education ==
Rangsiman was born on May 31, 1992, in Phuket, Thailand. He graduated from the Faculty of Law, Thammasat University.

== Career ==
He took his first steps in activism during his student years.

=== Political activist ===
Rangsiman gained national-level visibility as a political activist in the aftermath of the 2014 Thai coup d'état, and was a member of the New Democracy Movement. He became a member of the Future Forward Party on October 27, 2018, and became a party-list MP following the 2019 Thai general election.

In May 2018, he took part in the demonstrations organized by the 'We Want Election' group. On 22 May, he was arrested by the police along with 14 other human rights activists, among whom were Piyarat Chongthep, Chonthicha Jaengraew and Arnon Nampa.

=== Member of Parliament (2019-) ===
He later became a party-list Member of Parliament following the Thailand. After the dissolution of the Future Forward Party (FFP), Rangsiman, together with 53 other MPs, joined the Move Forward Party (MFP), regarded as the FFP’s successor.

In February 2023, MPs debated the Thai government's performance. On 15 February 2023, during a parliamentary debate regarding the government's performance on tackling illicit drugs and the shadow economy, Rangsiman accused Prayut Chan-o-cha of associating with corrupt figures and neglecting the government's pledge to address drug issues, He implicated senator Upakit Pachariyangkun in a money laundering and drug trafficking case involving Upakit's son-in-law and Tun Min Latt, a Burmese businessman. At a press conference thereafter, Rangsit accused Upakit of falsely declaring his assets before assuming his senate seat in 2019. During the debate, Rangsiman also exposed the issue of corruption within Thai law enforcement agencies in relation to an alleged Chinese triad leader. On February 19, Thai police announced they would press charges against the individual in question, a Chinese national.

== See also ==
- Move Forward Party
