= 2020 in Thailand =

- Decades: 2000s; 2010s; 2020s; 2030s
- See also: Other events of 2020; Timeline of Thai history

The year 2020 is the 239th year of the Rattanakosin Kingdom of Thailand. It was the fifth year in the reign of King Vajiralongkorn (Rama X), and is reckoned as year 2563 in the Buddhist Era. The year was most significantly marked by the global COVID-19 pandemic, which reached Thailand in January, as well as widespread youth-led protest movements against the government and for reform of the monarchy.

== Incumbents ==
- King: Vajiralongkorn
- Prime Minister: Prayut Chan-o-cha
- Supreme Patriarch: Ariyavongsagatanana (Amborn Ambaro)

== Events ==
=== January ===
- January 13 - The Ministry of Public Health reported the first confirmed case of COVID-19. It marked the first exported case of the COVID-19 pandemic and the first outside China.

=== February ===
- February 8–9 – Nakhon Ratchasima shootings.
- February 21
  - The Constitutional Court of Thailand ordered the dissolution of the Future Forward Party, disqualifying its executives, including Thanathorn Juangroongruangkit, from running as Members of Parliament.
  - Demonstrations since erupted in various high schools, colleges, and universities nationwide. It was the start of 2020–2021 Thai protests.

=== March ===
- March 1 - COVID-19 pandemic started when MOPH reported the first confirmed death in Thailand.
- March 21 - COVID-19 pandemic, 89 new cases reported on 21 March, the largest single-day rise since the virus reached the country.
- March 26 - The digital switchover is completed and the transmission of analogue television ceases. The signals are shut on the same day.

=== July ===
- July 18 - 2020–2021 Thai protests second wave started. street demonstration at the Democracy Monument in Bangkok with around 2,500 protesters. The protesters announced their three core demands: dissolution of the House, ending intimidation of the people and drafting a new constitution.

=== August ===
- August 3 – Arnon Nampa and two student groups publicly raised demands to reform the monarchy, breaking a long taboo of publicly criticising the monarchy.
- August 10 – Ten demands for monarchy reform were declared by Panusaya Sithijirawattanakul from United Front of Thammasat and Demonstration group. Totaling about 3,000 people, it employed the slogan "We don't want reforms; we want revolution." Among the events was the monarchy reform speeches by Panupong Jadnok and Arnon Nampa.
- August 18 - A large gathering which around 20,000–25,000 people joined was held at the Democracy Monument and reiterated calls for a revised constitution and reforms to the monarchy.

=== September ===
- September 19 – The protesters gathered at Thammasat University Ta Prachan, then moved to Sanam Luang in the afternoon and stayed overnight there, with attendance estimated at anywhere between 20,000 and 100,000. The rally has been described as an open challenge to King Vajiralongkorn.
- September 20 - The protesters installed a plaque symbolizing the now-missing Khana Ratsadon plaque at Sanam Luang. The protesters submitted their demands to the President of the Privy Council via the chief of the Metropolitan Police Bureau before dispersing.

=== October ===
- October 14
  - Tens of thousands of Thais participated in anti-monarchy protests in Bangkok.
  - Antigovernment protesters heckled Suthida as she was driven in the royal limousine in Bangkok.
- October 15
  - Prime Minister Prayuth Chan-ocha ordered riot police to disperse protesters outside of the Government House of Thailand.
  - Protest leaders Arnon Nampa, Parit Chiwarak, and Panupong Jadnok were arrested, according to Thai Lawyers for Human Rights.
- October 16
  - In an emergency cabinet meeting, Prime Minister Prayuth Chan-ocha announced that he would not be resigning.
  - 2,000 protesters, mostly teenagers, gathered at Pathum Wan Intersection, and two hours later were dispersed by the police. High-pressure water cannons with chemical-filled water and tear gas were used. The Commander of the Metropolitan Police reported at least 100 people were arrested. There were protests almost daily from 17 to 24 October, even though they were faced with government-ordered shutdown of the capital's rapid transit systems.
- October 19
  - Prime Minister Prayuth Chan-ocha stated that Parliament would be recalled from its recess.
  - The National Broadcasting and Telecommunications Commission was ordered to block Telegram due to its use by protesters.
- October 26 - Protesters marched to the German Embassy in Bangkok, petitioning the German government to investigate the King's activities in Germany, if he had exercising powers from German soil.

=== November ===
- November 8 - An estimated 7,000–10,000 protesters marched from Democracy Monument to the Grand Palace to deliver their letters to the King. The protesters insisted that their demand to reform the monarchy is already the best compromise they could offer.
- November 14 - Around 20 protesting groups ranging from high school, women rights to LGBTQ activists in an event called "Mob Fest". One event resulted in a covering of Democracy Monument with cloth, and a small clash with the police.
- November 17 - The Senate and House of Representatives began a two-day joint session to consider changes to the constitution. That day, at least 55 people were hurt when protesters near Parliament clashed with the police and yellow-shirted royalists. Police fired tear gas and water cannon at the crowd. Six people suffered gunshot wounds. On the second day, lawmakers rejected five of the seven proposals to amend the constitution, including the submission by Internet Law Reform Dialogue, or iLaw, which was most preferred by the protesters.
- November 18 - Angered by the rejection of the people-proposed constitutional bill and the use of force the day before, thousands of protesters gathered at the Royal Thai Police's headquarters and hurled paint and sprayed graffiti in the area.
- November 25 - Over 10,000 protesters converged on the headquarters of Siam Commercial Bank (SCB) in northern Bangkok, in which the King is the largest shareholder, to demand an investigation into the king's wealth and spending.

=== December ===
- December 2 - The Constitutional Court ruled in favor of Prayut in a conflict-of-interest case over his use of military housing. The former army chief had been living in a military residence after retiring from the army in 2014, months after he led the coup over the elected government. The ruling allowed Pruyut to remain in power. Thousands of protesters gathered at the Lat Phrao Intersection to protest the verdict.

== Deaths ==
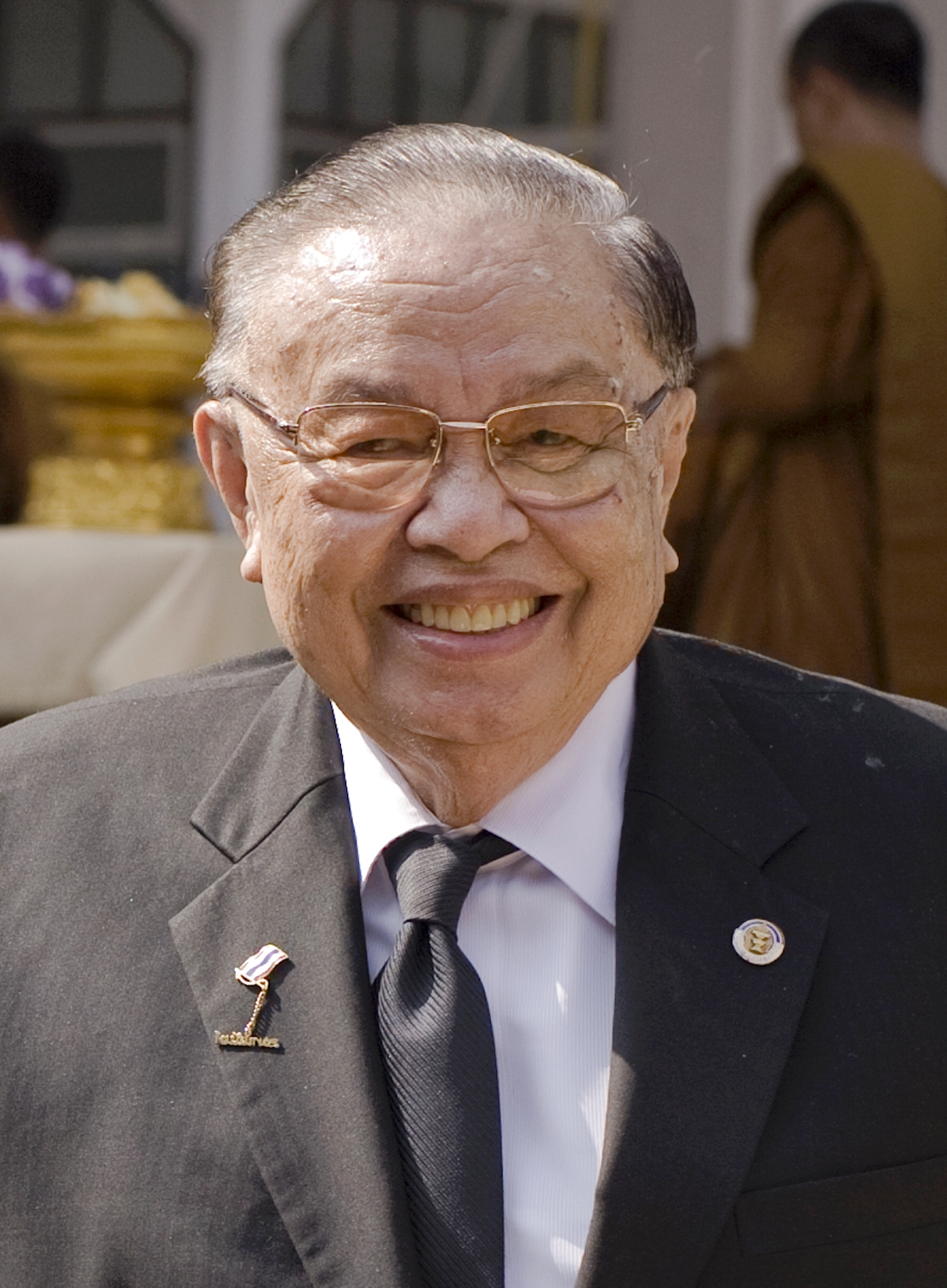
Chai Chidchob

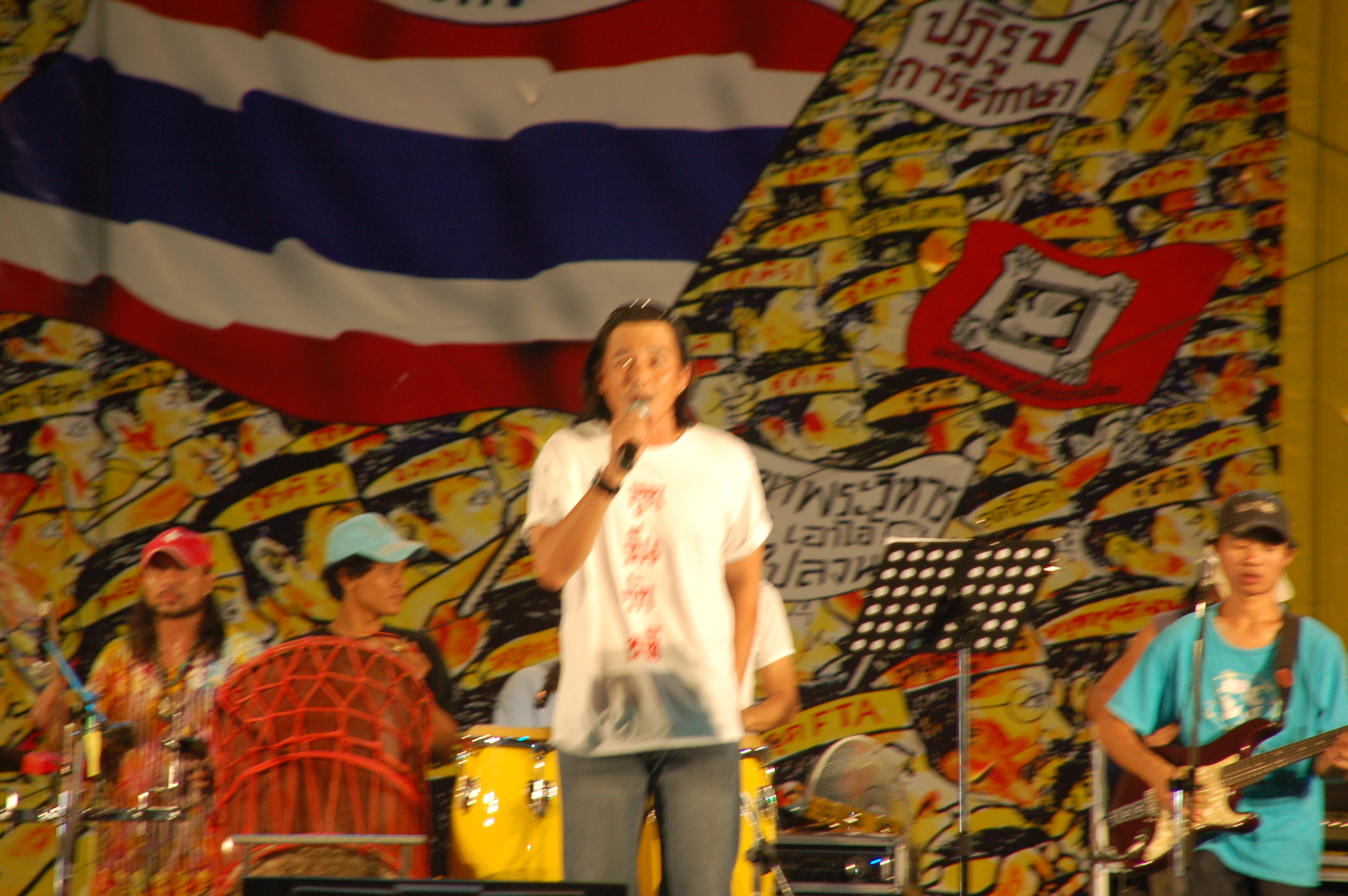
Sarunyoo Wongkrachang

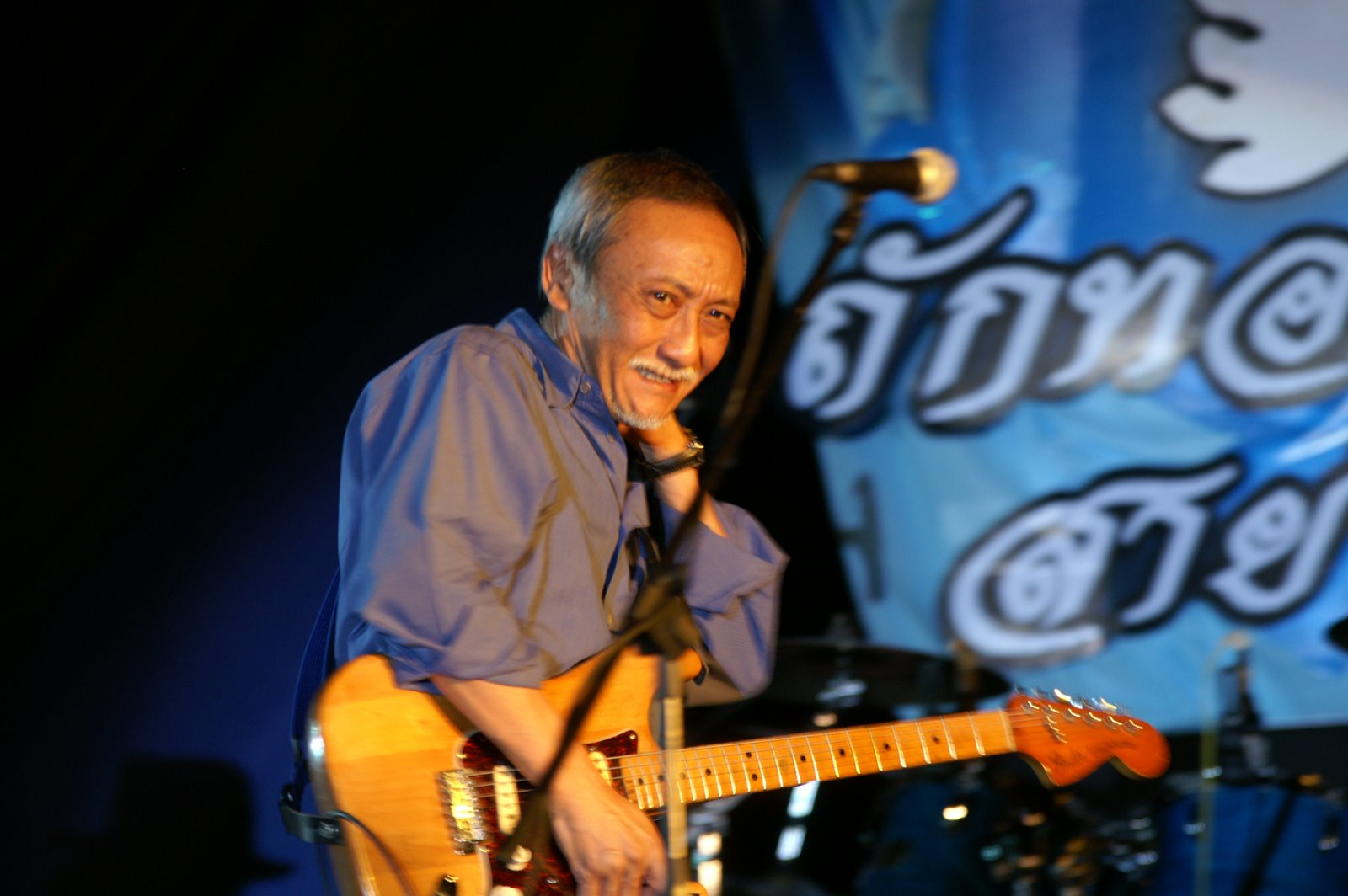
Kraisak Choonhavan

=== January ===
- 24 January – Chai Chidchob, politician (b. 1928).

=== June ===
- 10 June – Sarunyoo Wongkrachang, actor (b. 1960).
- 11 June – Kraisak Choonhavan, politician (b. 1947).
- 21 June – Apinan Kaewpila, footballer (b. 1985).
