= Parit Wacharasindhu =

Thai politician (born 1992)

- พริษฐ์ วัชรสินธุ
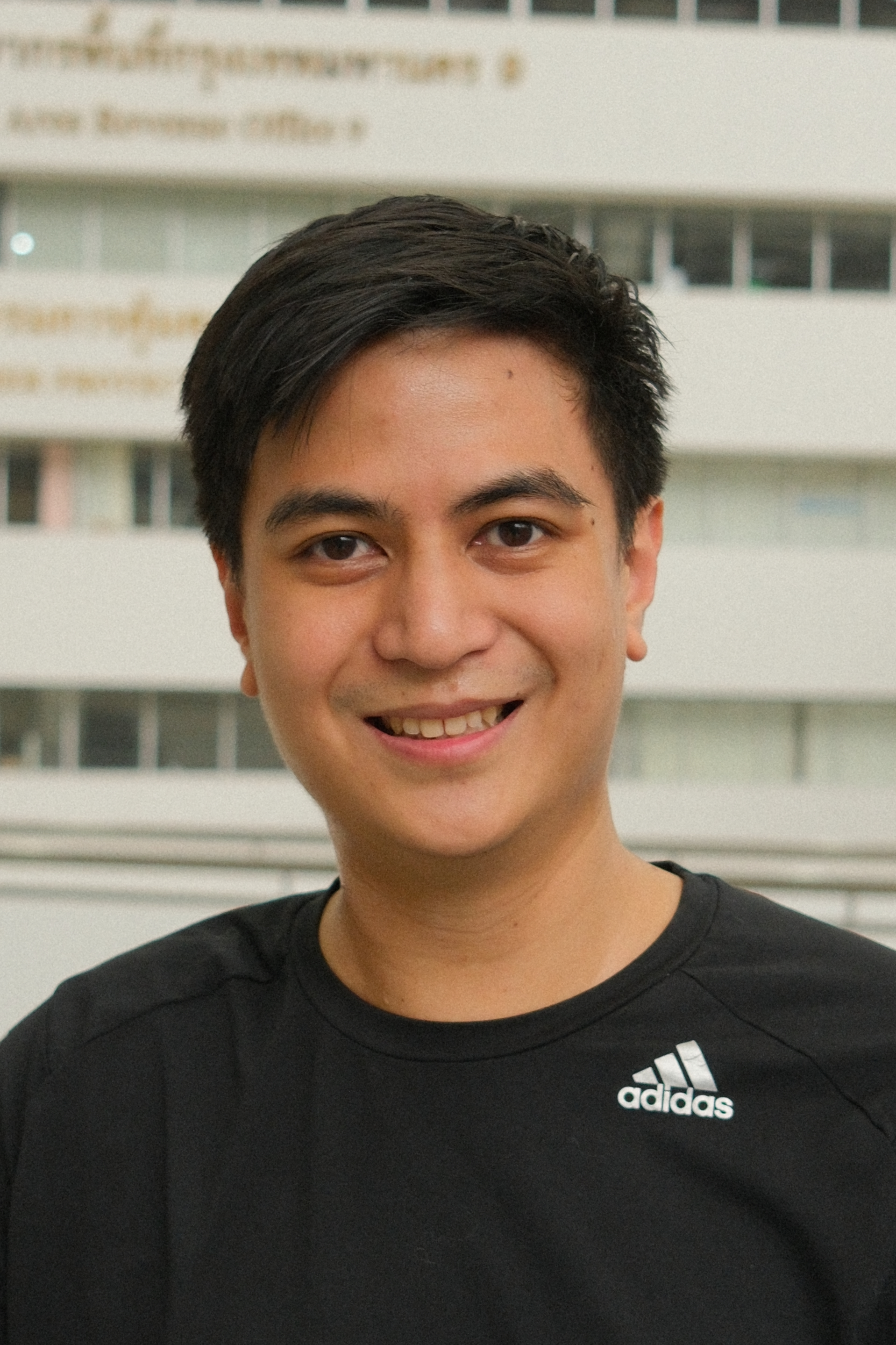
- Parit in 2026

Member of the House of Representatives
- Incumbent
- Assumed office 14 May 2023
- Constituency: Party-list

Spokesperson of People's Party
- In office 9 August 2024 – 26 April 2026
- Preceded by: Himself (Move Forward Party; de facto)
- Succeeded by: Pukkamon Nunanan

Spokesperson of Move Forward Party
- In office 23 September 2023 – 7 August 2024
- Preceded by: Rangsiman Rome
- Succeeded by: Himself (People's Party; de facto)

Personal details
- Born: 10 December 1992 (age 33) Bangkok, Thailand
- Party: People's Party (since 2024)
- Other political affiliations: Move Forward (2022–2024); Democrat (2018–2019)
- Parent(s): Suttipong Wacharasindhu (father); Alisa Wacharasindhu (mother)
- Relatives: Abhisit Vejjajiva (uncle)
- Education: Shrewsbury International School; Eton College
- Alma mater: St John's College, Oxford (BA)
- Occupation: Politician; TV host

Parit Wacharasindhu (Thai: พริษฐ์ วัชรสินธุ; born 10 December 1992), nicknamed Itim (Thai: ไอติม) is a Thai politician who currently serves as a party-list member of the Thai House of Representatives. He is also the current Spokesperson of the People's Party.

Parit was educated in the United Kingdom. He first entered politics as a candidate for the House of Representatives under the Democrat Party but later resigned after the Democrats joined a coalition led by the military-backed Palang Pracharath Party in the 2019 Thai general election. Since his resignation, he started an education company called Startdee, which he described as an affordable and high-quality educational platform. He then joined the Move Forward Party as the party's campaign manager on 30 April 2022.

== Early life and education ==
Parit was born into a prominent Thai family. Both his parents are doctors, and his mother, Prof. Dr. Alisa Wacharasindhu (née Vejjajiva), is the eldest sister of former prime minister and Democrat Party leader Abhisit Vejjajiva and are ethnic Chinese of Hakka descent originating from the province of Chanthaburi with ancestral roots in Guangdong, China. His father, Prof. Dr. Suttipong Wacharasindhu, is a former dean of the Faculty of Medicine, Chulalongkorn University and a former director of King Chulalongkorn Memorial Hospital.

Parit graduated from Chulalongkorn University Demonstration Elementary School. When he was nine years old, he travelled to study in England at preparatory schools, he said on an interview that the first time studying in the UK was very scary. After he returned to Thailand, he moved to Shrewsbury International School in order to learn more English. Then at the age of 13, he took King's Scholarship exam at Eton College and was later accepted as a scholar. He received a bachelor's degree in Philosophy, Politics and Economics (PPE), from St John's College, University of Oxford.

During his studies at Oxford in 2014, he was elected President of the Oxford Union, the largest student society at Oxford University, and one of the oldest debating societies in the world. He was the first Thai to take this role.

He is widely known in Thai society from being a trainee at the Office of the Prime Minister in 2009 while Abhisit Vejjajiva was Prime Minister.

Although, Mr Abhisit is also Parit's maternal uncle, which is widely known to have kickstarted Parit's political career and emphasize Parit's departure from his uncle's Democrat Party to join a leftist People's Party of Thailand.

== Early career ==
After graduating from Oxford, Parit planned to work in Thai politics, however, the country was still under military rule. Since there were no planned elections, he instead became a consultant for the firm McKinsey, working on various projects in Southeast Asia.

== Political career ==
In 2018, Parit left his job at McKinsey and returned to Thailand to start his career in Thai politics. He joined the Democrat Party and affirmed his desire to run for office to become a member of the House of Representatives.

While waiting for the military junta to declare elections, Parit hosted and co-produced a TV program "Hen Kub Ta" (เห็นกับตา; lit: "see with eyes") on PPTV HD, starting 4 May 2018. The show consisted of him trying out different jobs (such as garbage collector) in each episode.

He also co-founded the "New Dem" group within the Democrat Party, with the goals of ushering in a new generation of Democrat politicians.

On 26 December 2018, he was assigned to be a candidate in Bangkok's 13th constituency, consisting of Bang Kapi and Wang Thonglang (only Phlapphla) in the 2019 general election. The seat was previously held by Nat Bantadtan (son of previous Democrat leader, Banyat Bantadtan) and is considered a strong Democrat constituency. Generally, first-time candidates like Parit are not assigned to run in safe seats as these seats are reserved for incumbents or more senior party members.

However, the Democrat Party faced a devastating defeat in the 2019 election, losing all its seats in Bangkok, which is traditionally a Democrat stronghold. Parit, who ran in Bangkok's 13th constituency, came in 4th place.

=== Post 2019 election ===
After news reports that senior members of the party planned to form a coalition government with Palang Pracharath, a pro-junta party, Parit and his New Dem colleagues came out against this move, citing the party's campaign promise that it won't back Gen. Prayut and support the junta's continuation of power. Instead, Parit urged the party to organise an open primary where the party's members and non-members could vote on the party's future. However, the Democrat party eventually joined Palang Pracharath's coalition, and Parit soon left the party.

In 2022, Parit joined the Move Forward Party, one of the leading opposition parties in the National Assembly. Since then, he became the party's policy campaign manager. He has stated that he will not return to the Democrat Party.

=== 2023 election ===
In the 2023 Thai general election, Parit was the 11th candidate on the Move Forward Party List. He was elected to the House of Representatives.

== Personal life ==
Parit is known for his relationship with Channel 3's actress Nuttanicha Dungwattanawanich. They were together for three years before separating in 2017.

| Preceded by Rangsiman Rome | Move Forward Party Spokesperson; 2023-Present | Succeeded by - |
