= 2021 in Thailand =

- Decades: 2000s; 2010s; 2020s
- See also: Other events of 2021; Timeline of Thai history

The year 2021 was the 240th year of the Rattanakosin Kingdom of Thailand. It was the sixth year in the reign of King Vajiralongkorn (Rama X), and is reckoned as year 2564 in the Buddhist Era.

== Incumbents ==
- King: Vajiralongkorn
- Prime Minister: Prayut Chan-o-cha
- Supreme Patriarch: Ariyavongsagatanana IX

== Events ==
=== Ongoing events ===
- COVID-19 pandemic in Thailand

=== May ===
- 21 to 30 May – Scheduled date for the 2021 Asian Indoor and Martial Arts Games, hosted by Bangkok and Chonburi. This event was postponed due to the COVID-19 pandemic, initially 10 to 20 March 2022 then later postponed again to 17 to 26 November 2023.

== Deaths ==
- 3 February – Pong Sarasin, conglomerate executive and politician, former Deputy Prime Minister (born 1927).
- 7 September – Thanwa Raseetanu, luk thung singer (born 1970).
