= 2019 in Thailand =

- Decades: 1990s; 2000s; 2010s; 2020s; 2030s
- See also: Other events of 2019; Timeline of Thai history

The year 2019 is the 238th year of the Rattanakosin Kingdom of Thailand. It was the fourth year in the reign of King Vajiralongkorn (Rama X), and is reckoned as year 2562 in the Buddhist Era.

A general election, the first since the ruling military junta took power by coup in 2014, took place on 24 March.Tanakasempipat, Patpicha; Thepgumpanat, Panarat (23 January 2019). "Thailand sets long-awaited election for March 24". Reuters. The coronation of King Maha Vajiralongkorn happened on 4–6 May. The year also saw the continuation of the South Thailand Insurgency, as well as poor air quality around Bangkok, Pattaya, Chiang Mai, and the northern provinces.

Incumbents

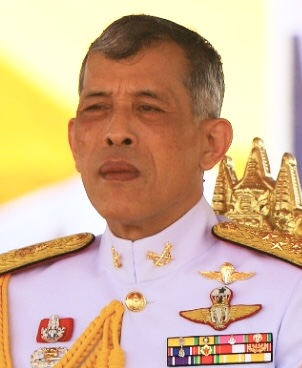
King

Vajiralongkorn

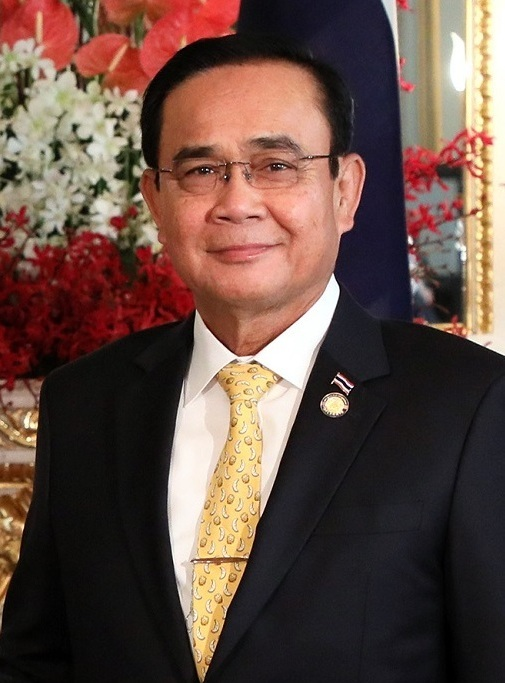
Prime-minister

Prayut Chan-o-cha

King: Vajiralongkorn

Prime Minister: Prayut Chan-o-cha

Supreme Patriarch: Ariyavongsagatanana VIII

== Events ==
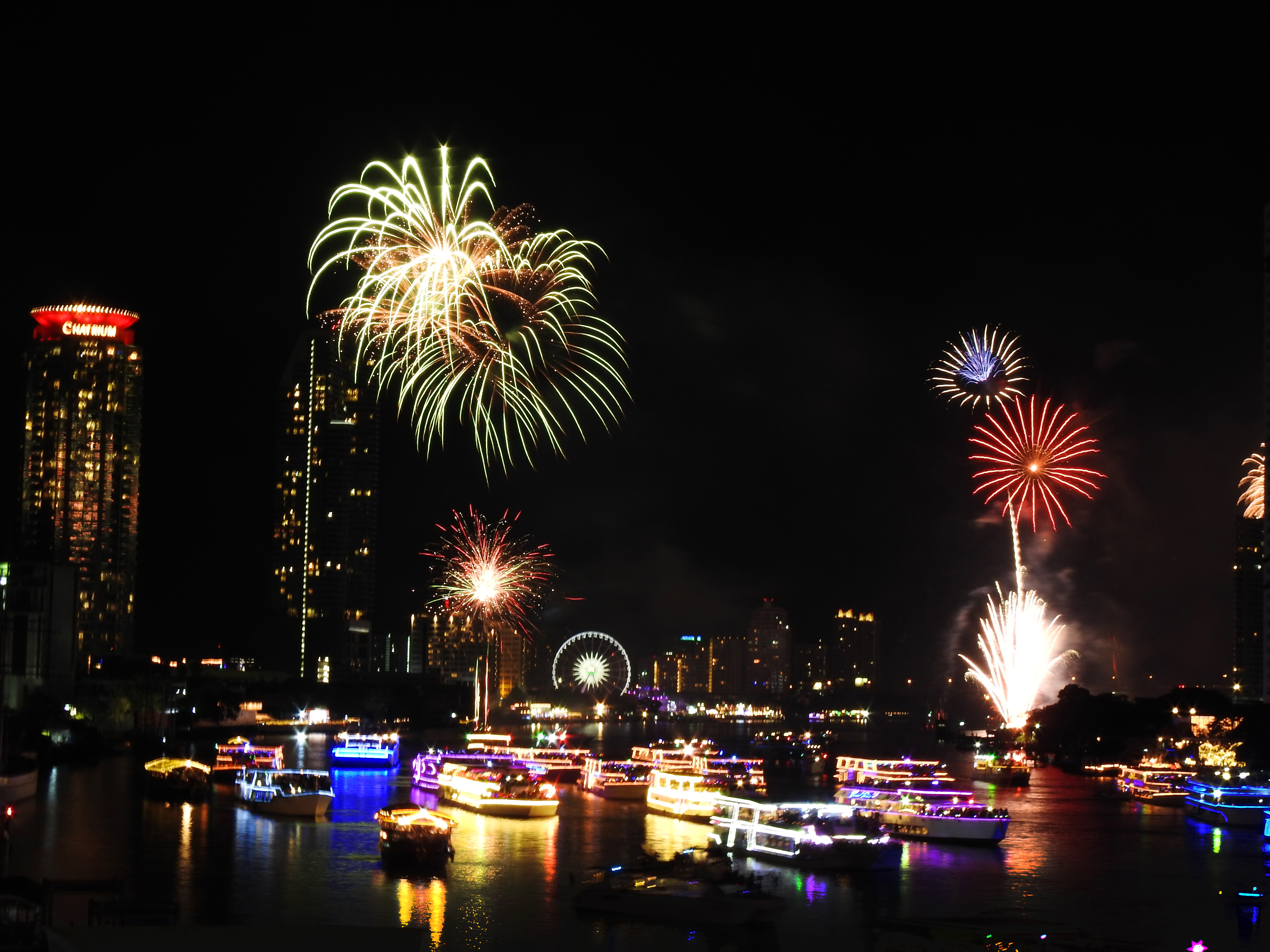
New Year fireworks in Bangkok

=== January ===
January 1 – The date of King Maha Vajiralongkorn's coronation was announced to be May 4–6.

January 4 – Tropical Storm Pabuk made landfall in the country's south, with flights in Phuket delayed.

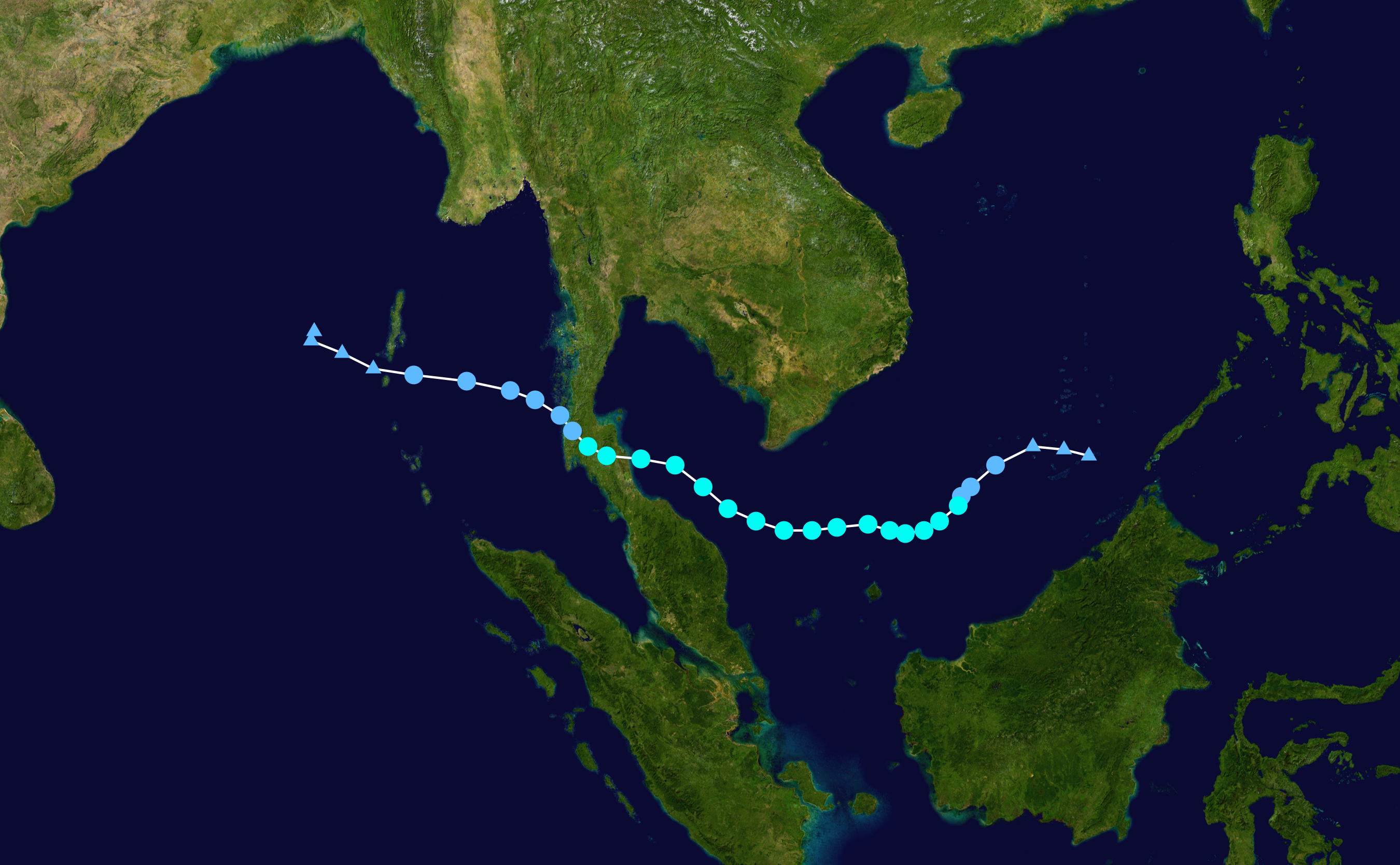
Map of Tropical Storm Pabuk's route

January 5 – Rahaf Mohammed was detained by Thai authorities whilst transiting through Bangkok airport, en route from Kuwait to Australia. She was attempting to flee her family and seek asylum in Australia because she said they subjected her to physical and psychological abuse, and was concerned that she could be killed if deported back to Saudi Arabia.

January 8 – South Thailand Insurgency: A 62-year-old school teacher was killed by a car-bomb explosion in Songkhla province. The explosion also injured 6 people.

January 10 – South Thailand Insurgency: Four Pattani defence volunteers in Pattani province were gunned down by insurgents disguised as Thai soldiers.

January 12 – The visa-fee-waiver for people from 21 nations was extended until after Songkran.

January 16 – The Pollution Control Department and Bangkok Metropolitan Administration held meetings regarding worsening air quality in Bangkok.

January 18 – South Thailand Insurgency: Two monks were killed after a Buddhist temple was stormed in Narathiwat province.Quinley, Caleb. "Attacks in Thailand's deep south: Who, why and what's next?". Aljazeera.

January 23 – The Thai Election Commission announced that the 2019 election would take place on March 24.Thaiger (2019-01-23). "Election date announced as Sunday, March 24". Thaiger.

January 27 – The NCPO announced that election advertising and social media posts would be restricted ahead of the election.Thaiger (2019-01-27). "NCPO restrict social media and advertising in election campaign". Thaiger.

January 28 – A BNK48 member apologized for wearing a shirt featuring a Nazi swastika after the Israeli embassy expressed dismay.Thaiger (2019-01-28). "BNK48 singer apologizes for wearing shirt emblazoned with a Nazi swastika". Thaiger.

January 29 – Bangkok's air quality worsened.Thaiger (2019-01-29). "Bangkok air deteriorates today". Thaiger. PM Prayut enacted Article 44 to suspend cannabis patents.Thaiger (2019-01-29). "Thai PM enacts his Article 44 powers to suspend cannabis patents". Thaiger.

January 30 – The Palang Pracharat party nominated PM Prayut, Deputy PM Somkid Jatusripitak, and party leader Uttama Savanayana as the party's candidates for the 2019 elections.Thaiger (2019-01-30). "Palang Pracharat nominate PM Prayut as a candidate". Thaiger.

January 31 – Prime Minister Prayut demanded action to improve Bangkok's worsening air quality.Thaiger (2019-01-31). "Bangkok air pollution: PM demands action and threatens limiting road traffic". Thaiger. Air quality in Bangkok and Pattaya reached unhealthy levels, prompting the closure of 437 Bangkok schools.Thaiger (2019-01-31). "Bangkok Air Quality: PM2.5 dust particle problem closes 437 schools". Thaiger.Thaiger (2019-01-31). "Pattaya air quality suffering as well". Thaiger.

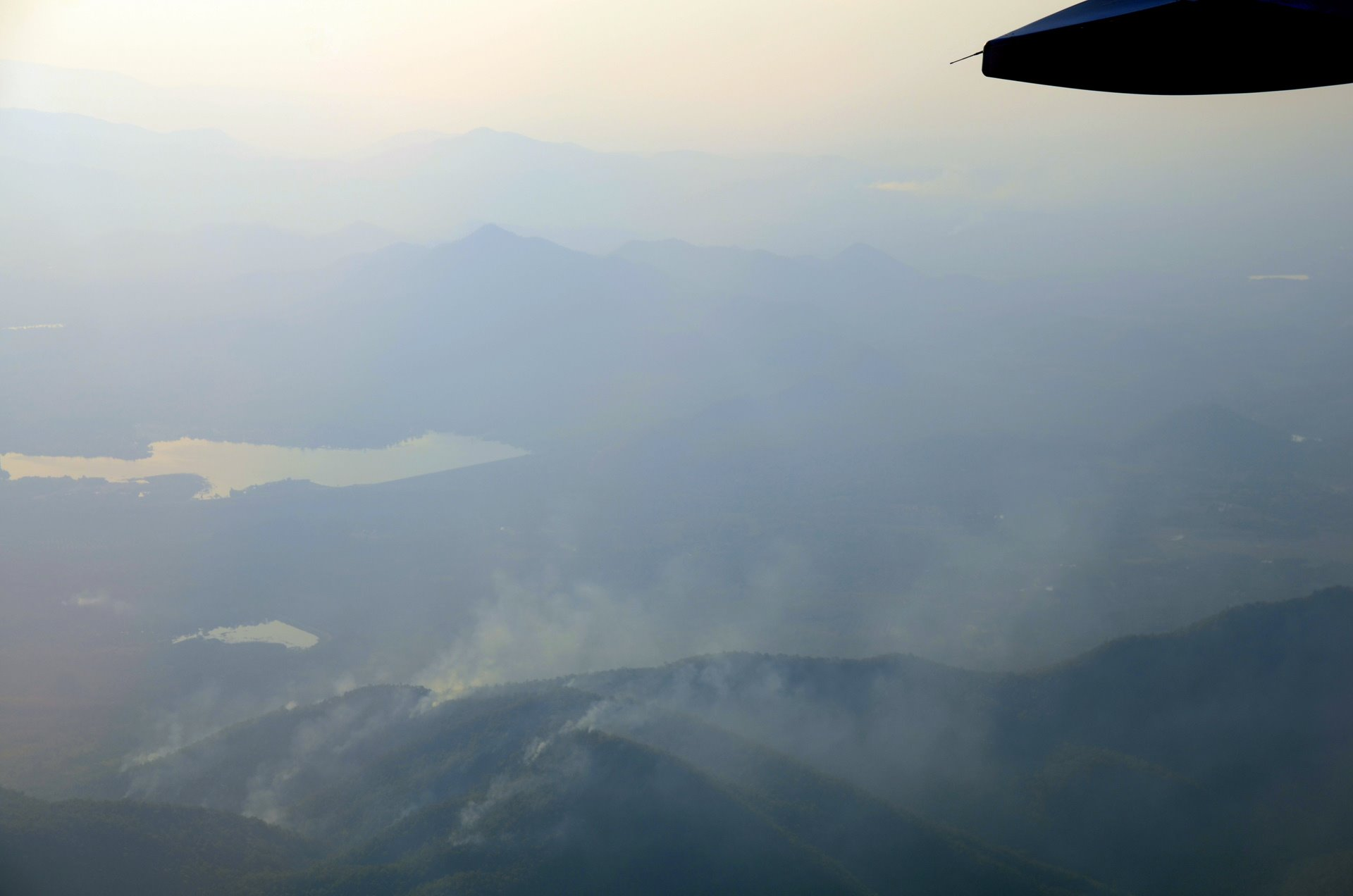
Aerial view of wildfires in Thailand's north

=== February ===
February 2 – American bitcoin investor Chad Elwartowski and his Thai wife Supranee Thepdet began erecting a seastead 22 km off Phuket's coast.Thaiger (2019-04-20). "Phuket seastead will be removed today". Thaiger.

February 3 – All AOT-operated airports were declared smoke-free zones.Thaiger (2019-02-04). "No more smoking in airports, and no more cheap Thai cigarettes". Thaiger. A fire on Phang Nga's Surin island destroyed a Moken village.Thaiger (2019-02-06). "Moken village fire - "destruction brings opportunities"". Thaiger.

February 5 – Australia called on Thailand to release Hakeem al-Araibi, who had been detained in Thailand since November 2018 facing extradition to Bahrain.Thaiger (2019-02-05). "Australian government demands Thailand release Hakeem Al-Araibi". Thaiger.

February 8 – Ubol Ratana, former princess and sister of the King, was nominated by the Thai Raksa Chart party as its prime ministerial candidate.Thaiger (2019-02-08). "Princess Ubolratana Mahidol runs as Prime Ministerial candidate in election". Thaiger.

February 9 – The King issued a royal order stating his sister's candidacy was inappropriate and unconstitutional.Thaiger (2019-02-09). ""Princess cannot run for office" - King of Thailand". Thaiger."Thailand disqualifies king's sister from election running". The Guardian. Reuters. 2019-02-11. ISSN 0261-3077. Famous Bangkok stray cat "Maew Asok" died.Thaiger (2019-02-09). "More than 500,000 people say goodbye to Thai celebrity cat "Maew Askoe"". Thaiger.

February 11 – Hakeem al-Araibi departed Thailand for Australia following the drop of extradition proceedings.Thaiger (2019-02-12). "Hakeem al-Araibi leaves Thailand to be re-united with his wife in Melbourne - VIDEO". Thaiger.

February 13 – Chiang Mai was ranked third worst globally for air pollution following seasonal fires.Thaiger (2019-02-13). "Chiang Mai: Third worst air-pollution in the world". Thaiger. The Election Commission voted to petition the Constitutional Court to dissolve Thai Raksa Chart party.Thaiger (2019-02-13). "Constitutional Court to have final say: EC votes to disband Thai Raksa Chart". Thaiger.

February 14 – South Thailand Insurgency: A bomb detonated in Narathiwat province, causing no casualties.Thaiger (2019-02-14). "Four rangers escape unharmed after insurgents' attack in Narathiwat". Thaiger.

February 16 – 107 of 2,810 candidates for the general election were disqualified by the Election Commission.Thaiger (2019-02-16). "2,810 MP candidates line up for March 24 election". Thaiger.

February 18 – South Thailand Insurgency: A ranger in Songkhla province was shot dead.Thaiger (2019-02-18). "Southern insurgency: Ranger shot dead in Songkhla house". Thaiger.

February 20 – Medical cannabis legalization came into official effect in Thailand.Thaiger (2019-02-20). "The legalisation of marijuana for medical purposes, is now in effect". Thaiger. A 4.9 magnitude earthquake occurred in Lampang province.Thaiger (2019-02-21). "No fatalities or injuries reported in Lampang earthquake". Thaiger.

February 21 – PM Prayut visited Eemi Nikula, a 5-year-old Finnish boy recovering at Krabi Nakharin International Hospital after a stray dog attack in Krabi.Com, The Phuket News (2019-02-27). "Phuket News: Finnish boy, 5, attacked by stray dogs at Ao Nang, Krabi". The Phuket News Com.Mueanhawong, Kritsada (2019-02-22). "PM visits Finnish boy attacked by dogs in Krabi". Thaiger. The King sent a flower vase to the boy.Thaiger (2019-02-23). "His Majesty sends flowers to five year old attacked by dogs in Krabi". Thaiger.

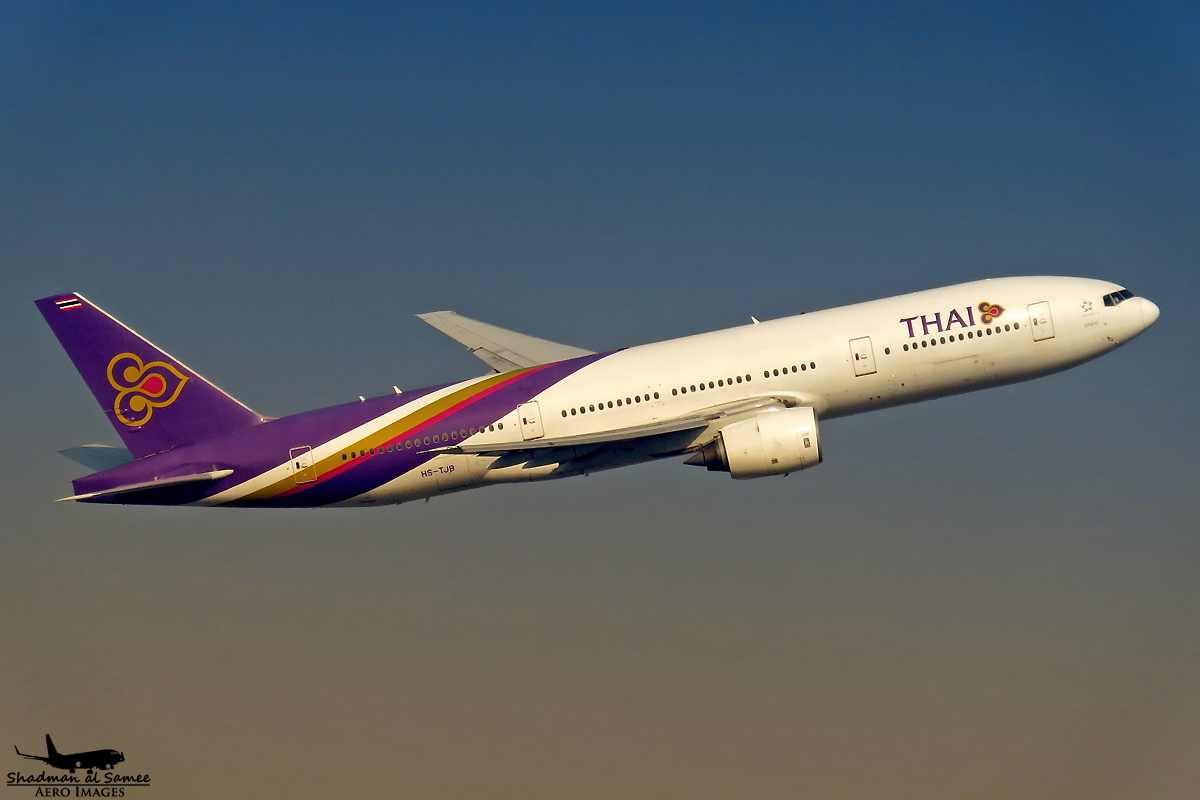
Thai Airways Boeing 777-200

February 24 – The King sent gifts recognizing Chat Ubonjinda, a Krabi fisherman praised for rescuing two Norwegian tourists from deep mud in 2015.Thaiger (2019-02-24). "HM the King recognises Krabi 'hero' after 2015 mud rescue". Thaiger.

February 26 – South Thailand Insurgency: A bomb killed one ranger and injured two others in Yala province. Eemi Nikula was discharged from the hospital in Krabi.Mueanhawong, Kritsada (2019-02-26). "Finnish boy, attacked by dogs, released from Krabi hospital". Thaiger.

February 27 – National Geographic began securing rights to produce a documentary regarding the Tham Luang cave rescue.Thaiger (2019-02-27). "National Geographic tries to secure rights to produce Tham Luang rescue doco". Thaiger.

February 28 – Thai Airways flights toward Europe, Oman, and Pakistan were cancelled due to Pakistani airspace closure amidst tensions with India. Flights to Europe resumed later via Chinese airspace.Thaiger (2019-02-28). "Thai Airways resumes flights to Europe via Chinese airspace". Thaiger.

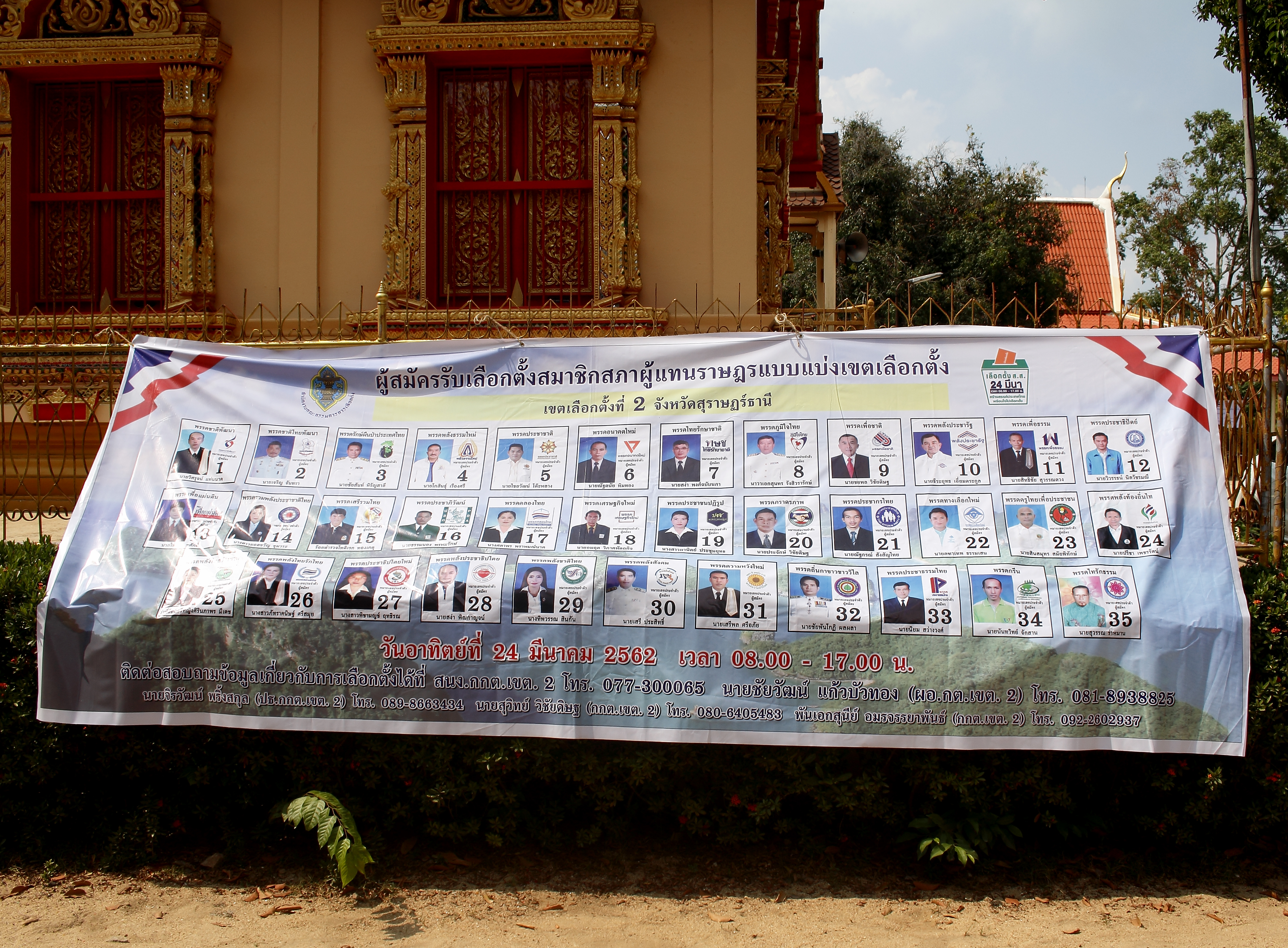
List of candidates at a polling station in Koh Samui for the elections

=== March ===
March 1 – A 50-day open burning ban took effect in Chiang Mai.Thaiger (2019-03-01). "Day One of burning ban - Chiang Mai still choking on poor air quality". Thaiger.

March 3 – Online controversy arose after MasterChef used a rare spotted eagle ray as an ingredient on World Wildlife Day.Thaiger (2019-03-04). "Is cooking endangered rays on 'MasterChef Thailand' OK?". Thaiger.

March 7 – The Thai Raksa Chart party was dissolved by the Constitutional Court, with 14 executives banned from politics for ten years.Thaiger (2019-03-07). "Constitutional Court dissolves Thai Raksa Chart party and bans party members". Thaiger. Netflix secured production rights for a miniseries on the Tham Luang cave rescue.Thaiger (2019-03-08). "Netflix scores production coup with major documentary about cave rescue". Thaiger.

March 9 – South Thailand Insurgency: Coordinated bombings struck Satun and Phatthalung provinces, causing property damage but no fatalities."Series of blasts rock Satun, Phatthalung". www.nationthailand.com.

Results of the March elections

March 10 – A man was killed in Chachoengsao province while streaming on Facebook Live when an unexploded M79 ordnance detonated after he entered a military training zone.Thaiger (2019-03-09). "Chachoengsao man killed by grenade explosion on Facebook Live". Thaiger.

March 13 – Phuket Governor Phakkaphong Tavipatana welcomed Almaty Region Governor Amandyk Batalov to Phuket.Mueanhawong, Kritsada (2019-03-13). "Almaty Governor from Kazakhstan visits Phuket". Thaiger.

March 14 – Heavy smoke and haze forced Bangkok Airways to cancel morning flights into Mae Hong Son Airport.Thaiger (2019-03-14). "Haze and poor visibility grounds morning flights into Mae Hong Son". Thaiger.

March 15 – PM candidate Prayut Chan-o-cha and Future Forward candidate Thanathorn Juangroongruangkit were officially cleared to contest the election by the Election Commission.Thaiger (2019-03-15). "Prayut and Thanathorn cleared to proceed with election". Thaiger.

March 17 – Early voting opened across Thailand for registered absentees.Thaiger (2019-03-17). "Thais vote today as registered absentees in the lead up to next week's election". Thaiger.

March 23 – A mandatory 24-hour election alcohol ban began nationwide.Thaiger (2019-03-23). "Ban on alcohol for 24 hours, starts today at 6pm". Thaiger.

March 24 – The 2019 Thai general election took place, the first general election since 2011. Pro-junta Palang Pracharath secured the highest popular vote, while Pheu Thai won the largest share of constituency seats.Thaiger (2019-03-25). "UPDATE: Election results - what it all means". Thaiger.Thaiger (2019-03-25). "Pheu Thai wins the Lower House - Unofficial from the EC". Thaiger.

March 26 – Pheu Thai and Palang Pracharath both claimed mandates to form a governing coalition.Thaiger (2019-03-26). "Parties race to cobble together a working coalition". Thaiger.

March 27 – Sudarat Keyuraphan announced an anti-junta coalition representing seven parties with over 255 seats.Thaiger (2019-03-27). "Anti-Junta bloc announces coalition with at least 255 seats". Thaiger.

March 31 – Royal decorations previously awarded to former prime minister Thaksin Shinawatra were revoked by the King.Thaiger (2019-03-31). "King revokes royal decorations from former PM Thaksin". Thaiger. THAI Smile launched non-stop service connecting Kolkata and Bangkok."THAI Smile opens new Bangkok-Kolkata service". www.nationthailand.com.

=== April ===
April 3 – Severe downpours triggered localized flash flooding across Pattaya.Thaiger (2019-04-03). "Pattaya hit by sudden topical deluge". Thaiger.

April 4 – The Election Commission ordered recounts at two polling stations and re-voting at six others.Thaiger (2019-04-04). "Recounts and new elections ordered in eight polling stations". Thaiger.

April 6 – Future Forward leader Thanathorn surrendered to police to answer sedition charges linked to 2015 student protests, observed by foreign diplomats.Thaiger (2019-04-06). "Thanathorn urged to 'fight on' as he surrenders to Bangkok police". Thaiger.

April 7 – Sacred water gathering rituals were performed across 76 provinces for the royal coronation.Thaiger (2019-04-07). "Sacred waters begin their journey to Bangkok for Royal Coronation". Thaiger.

April 9 – Foreign Minister Don Pramudwinai criticized western diplomats who attended Thanathorn's police summons.Thaiger (2019-04-09). "Foreign Minister angry at foreign diplomats who attended Thanathorn's reporting to police". Thaiger. Immigration Bureau chief Surachate Hakparn was abruptly transferred to an inactive post by PM Prayut.

April 10 – A fire broke out at CentralWorld complex in Bangkok, killing two and injuring twenty.Thaiger (2019-04-11). "UPDATE: 2 confirmed dead, 20 injured in Central World Bangkok fire". Thaiger.

April 11 – South Thailand Insurgency: A security clash in Songkhla province left a police officer and an insurgent wounded.Thaiger (2019-04-11). "Police officer and wanted insurgent shot in Songkhla clash". Thaiger.

April 12 – Songkran festival began; authorities recorded 46 fatalities and 482 injuries on day one of holiday travel.Thaiger (2019-04-12). "46 die on the roads in Day One of Songkran 'Seven Days of Danger'". Thaiger.

April 13 – Bangkok Governor Aswin Kwanmuang led the sacred water preparation ceremony at the Grand Palace.Thaiger (2019-04-13). "Sacred water drawing ceremony led by Bangkok Governor". Thaiger.

April 17 – South Thailand Insurgency: Insurgents ambushed and killed a village chief in Yala province.Thaiger (2019-04-17). "Village leader killed in Yala in an insurgent ambush". Thaiger.

April 19 – Cave divers Richard Harris and Craig Challen received the Order of the Direkgunabhorn for their heroics during the Tham Luang rescue.Thaiger (2019-04-19). "Australian Tham Luang cave divers receive prestigious Thai awards". Thaiger. The Royal Thai Navy received orders to inspect an unauthorized offshore seastead near Phuket.Thaiger (2019-04-19). "Prawit instructs the Royal Thai Navy to take action against the Seastead". Thaiger.

April 21 – The Cabinet of Thailand approved a 21.7-billion-baht third runway for Suvarnabhumi Airport.Thaiger (2019-04-21). "Third runway for BKK Suvarnabhumi Airport". Thaiger.

April 22 – The Royal Thai Navy dismantled the seastead off the coast of Phuket.Mueanhawong, Kritsada (2019-04-22). "Phuket seastead being removing by Thai Navy today". Thaiger.

April 23 – Water reservoirs in Phuket dropped to critical levels following severe rainfall shortages.Mueanhawong, Kritsada (2019-04-23). "Phuket's water supply in a critical situation". Thaiger.

April 25 – High-velocity winds battered Don Mueang International Airport, damaging airport facilities and stranding 3,000 travelers.Thaiger (2019-04-25). "Freak storm batters Don Mueang Airport, Bangkok". Thaiger.

April 29 – Royal Australian Navy vessel HMAS Canberra docked at Phuket for Indo-Pacific Endeavour 2019.Mueanhawong, Kritsada (2019-04-29). "Australian navy ship HMAS Canberra visits Phuket for maritime exercises". Thaiger.

April 30 – Netflix named Nattawut Poonpiriya and Jon M. Chu as directors for the upcoming Tham Luang rescue miniseries.Bakare, Lanre (2019-04-30). "Netflix names directors of Thai cave rescue drama". The Guardian. ISSN 0261-3077.

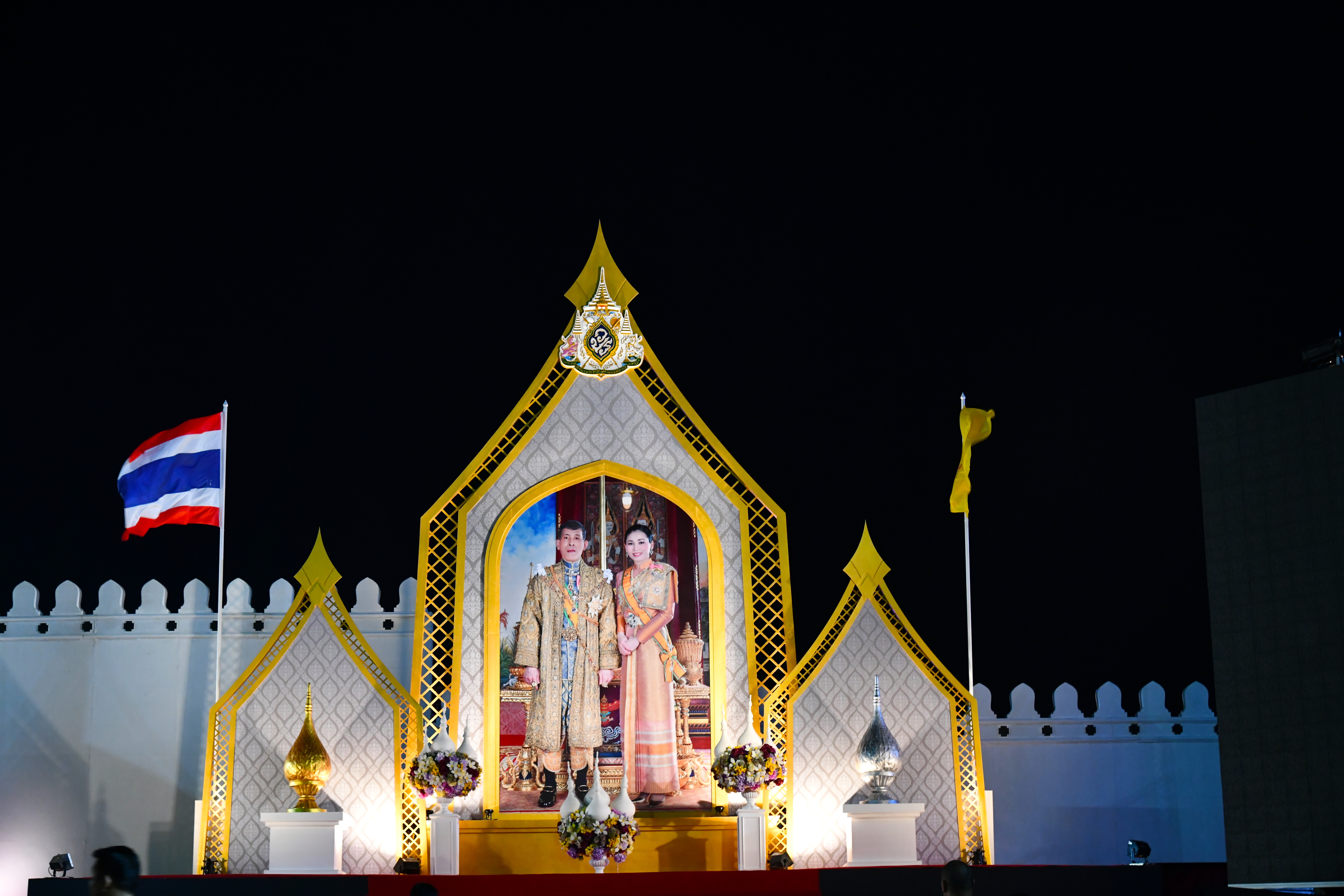
Celebration event during the coronation

=== May ===
May 1 – South Thailand Insurgency: A ranger was killed in a roadside bombing in Pattani.Thaiger (2019-05-01). "Ranger killed in Pattani roadside bomb ambush". Thaiger. King Vajiralongkorn married General Suthida Vajiralongkorn na Ayudhya, formally naming her Queen of Thailand.Thaiger (2019-05-01). "His Majesty marries Suthida and names her Queen, days before coronation". Thaiger.

May 3 – A royal pardon freed thousands of inmates ahead of the coronation, including former leaders of the People's Alliance for Democracy.Thaiger (2019-05-03). "HM The King pardons thousands of prisoners". Thaiger.

May 4 – The three-day coronation of King Vajiralongkorn commenced at the Grand Palace in Bangkok.Beech, Hannah (2019-05-04). "Thailand King, Crowned With Glitter and Gold, Vows to 'Reign With Righteousness'". The New York Times. ISSN 0362-4331.

May 7 – Sixty members of the National Legislative Assembly resigned to assume appointed Senate seats.Thaiger (2019-05-07). "60 NLA members resign to become Senators in the new parliament". Thaiger.

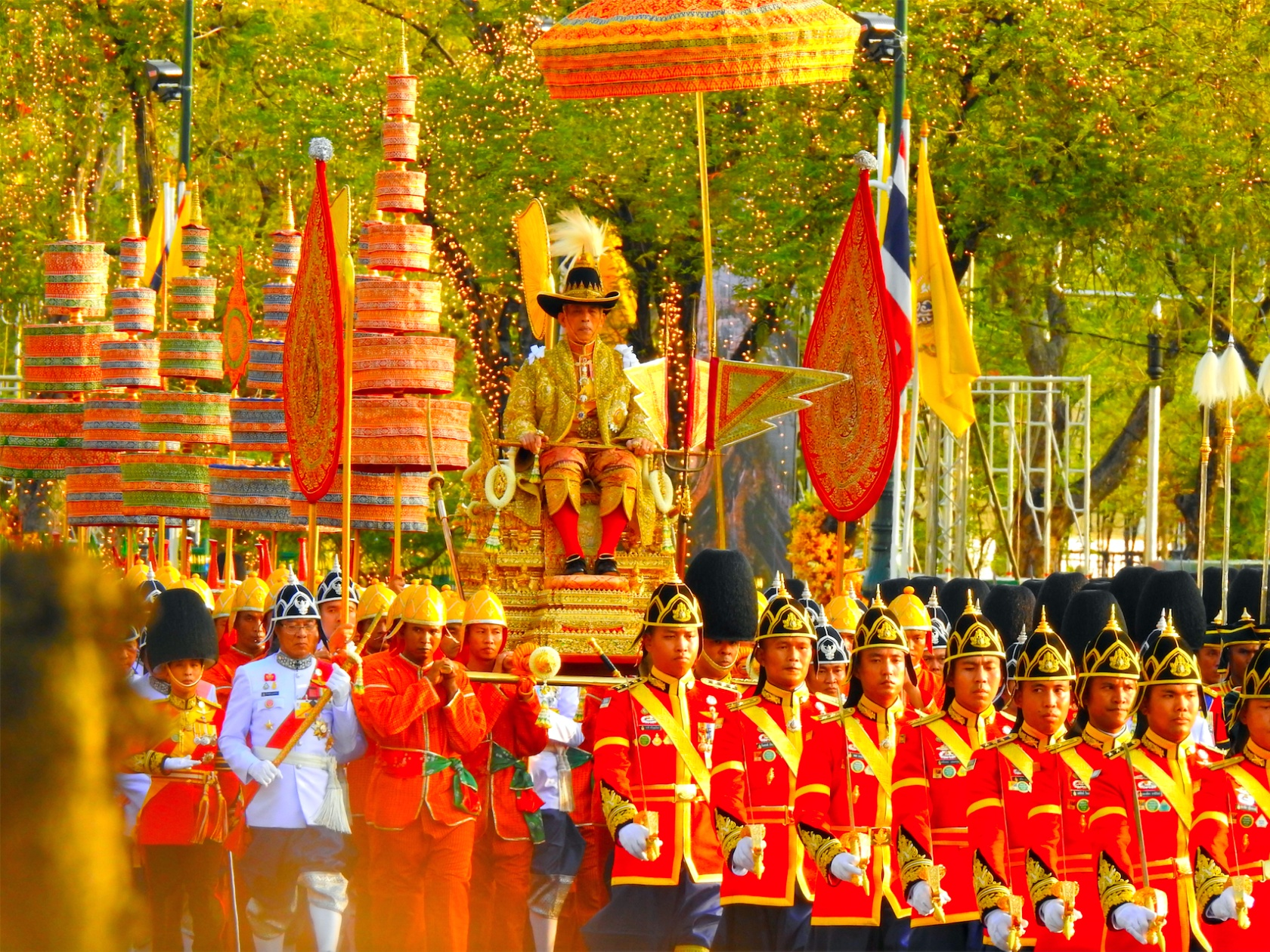
The King on May 5

May 8 – The Election Commission finalized party-list allocations, distributing seats to 27 political parties.Thaiger (2019-05-08). "The Election Commission awards 27 parties with seats in the new parliament". Thaiger.

May 9 – Wat Bot district in Phitsanulok was declared a severe drought disaster area.Thaiger (2019-05-09). "A Phitsanulok district has been declared a drought zone". Thaiger.

May 13 – Eleven micro-parties pledged coalition support for Prayut Chan-o-cha to retain the premiership.Thaiger (2019-05-13). "Prayut says he commands the support of 11 small parties to become next PM". Thaiger.

May 14 – The Royal Thai Army ordered 37 refurbished M1126 Stryker armoured vehicles from the United States.Thaiger (2019-05-14). "Thailand puts in order for 37 new armoured vehicles from the US". Thaiger.

May 16 – Coordinated pipe bomb explosions wounded five people in Yala province.Thaiger (2019-05-16). "Co-ordinated pipe bomb attacks in Yala injure five". Thaiger. The Nation announced the discontinuation of its daily print edition to transition fully digital.Thaiger (2019-05-16). "As readers abandon print, The Nation announces closure of daily printed paper". Thaiger.

May 18 – Visakha Bucha was marked nationwide with temple merit-making ceremonies.Thaiger (2019-05-18). "Buddhists commemorate Visakha Bucha Day - Monday will be a holiday". Thaiger.

May 20 – Palang Pracharath leaders announced tentative coalition pacts with the Democrat and Bhumjaithai parties.Thaiger (2019-05-20). "Pro-junta bloc says they have a 'deal' with Democrats and Bhumjaithai". Thaiger.

May 26 – Former prime minister Chuan Leekpai of the Democrat Party was elected Speaker of the House of Representatives with 258 votes, defeating opposition candidate Sompong Amornvivat.Thaiger (2019-05-26). "Former PM Chuan elected speaker of lower house". Thaiger.

May 30 – Thailand's National Reserved and Protected Wildlife Committee designated the whale shark, leatherback turtle, Omura's whale, and Bryde's whale as protected reserved species.Thaiger (2019-05-30). "Four Thai marine species announced as 'reserved animals'". Thaiger.

May 31 – King Power retained its retail and duty-free operating concessions for Suvarnabhumi Airport.Thaiger (2019-05-31). "King Power wins duty free and shopping management contract for Suvarnabhumi". Thaiger.

=== June ===
June 1 – Thai AirAsia inaugurated nonstop scheduled service connecting Phuket with Phnom Penh.Thaiger (2019-04-04). "Thai AirAsia connects Phuket direct to Phnom Penh". Thaiger.

June 11 – The Thailand women's national football team suffered a 13–0 defeat against the United States at the 2019 FIFA Women's World Cup, setting a World Cup record margin.Beech, Hannah; Jirenuwat, Ryn (2019-06-12). "A 13-0 World Cup Rout? Thailand Is as Proud as Ever". The New York Times. ISSN 0362-4331.

=== August ===
2 August – 2019 Bangkok bombings: Multiple improvised explosive devices detonated across Bangkok during the ASEAN foreign ministers summit.

=== November ===
6 November – Gunmen attacked a security checkpoint in Yala Province, killing 15 Village Defence Volunteers in one of the deadliest single incidents of the southern insurgency.Boonthanom, Surapan; Wongcha-um, Panu; Thepgumpanat, Panarat (November 6, 2019). Tait, Paul; Fernandez, Clarence; Richardson, Alex (eds.). "Gunmen kill 15 in southern Thailand's worst attack in years". Reuters.

Deaths
