= Shrewsbury International School =

Coordinates: 13°42′36.1″N 100°30′33.2″E

Shrewsbury International School Bangkok
- โรงเรียนนานาชาติโชรส์เบอรี กรุงเทพ
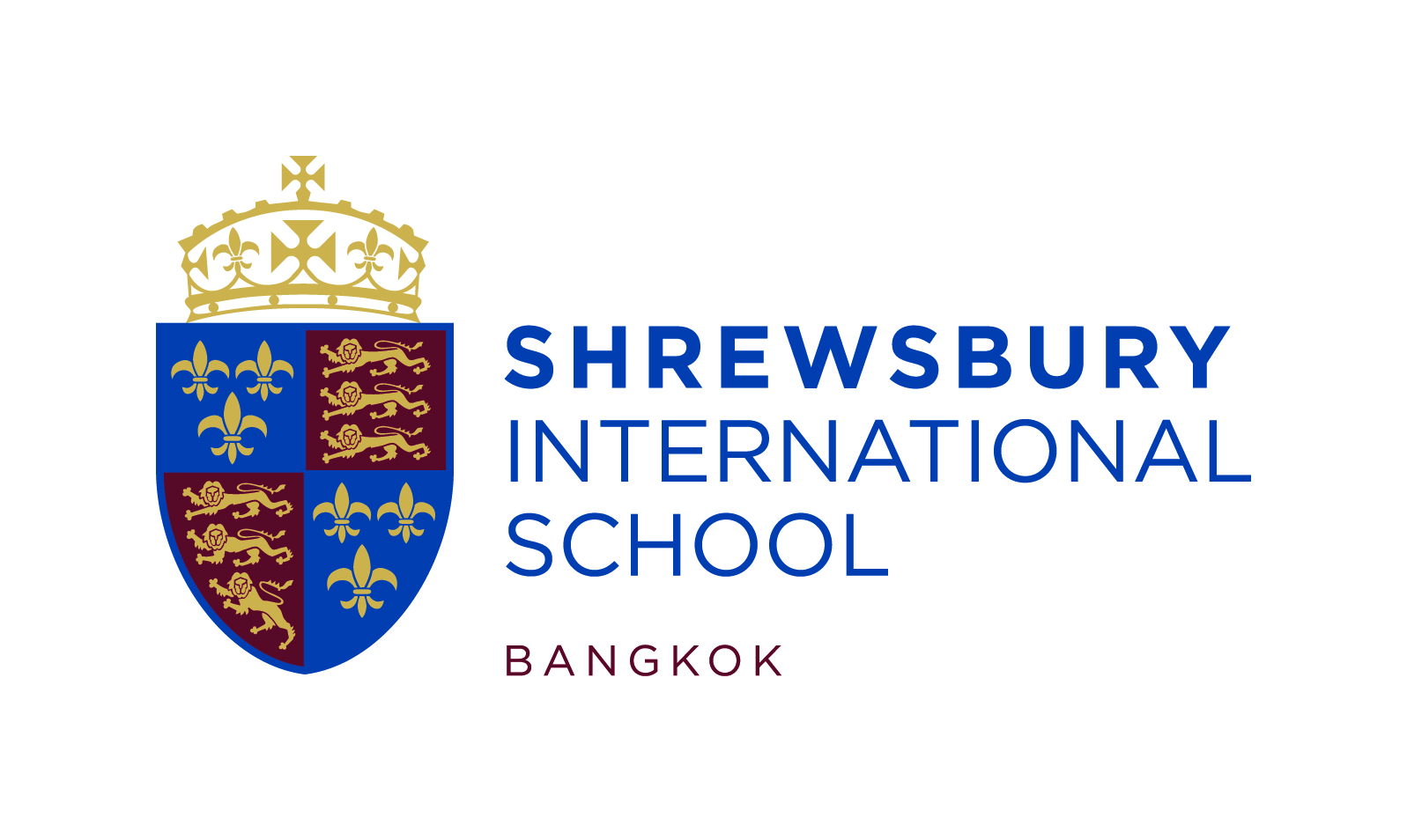

Location
- 1922 Charoen Krung Road, Wat Prayakrai, Bang Kholame; Bangkok; Thailand, 10120

Information
- School type: International School
- Motto: Intus Si Recte Ne Labora (If the heart is right, all will be well.)
- Established: 2003
- Principal: Robert Millar
- Gender: Boys/Girls
- Age range: 3–18 years old
- Enrollment: 2000+ students
- International students: 40 nationalities
- Education system: National Curriculum for England
- Classes offered: Early Year 1 – Year 13
- Campuses: Shrewsbury International School Bangkok Riverside Campus; Shrewsbury International School Bangkok City Campus
- Houses: 6
- Yearbook: On the River
- Affiliation: FOBISIA, ONESQA, BISAC
- Website: Shrewsbury International School

Shrewsbury International School Bangkok (Thai: โรงเรียนนานาชาติโชรส์เบอรี กรุงเทพ) is a coeducational British international school in Charoen Krung, Bang Kho Laem District, Bangkok, Thailand. It was established in 2003 and is affiliated with Shrewsbury School in the UK. The school is divided into 3 schools: Pre-prep school, Junior school and Senior school, which includes sixth form. The school follows the National Curriculum of England.

== History ==
Shrewsbury International School Bangkok was founded in 2003 and a second campus, dubbed as City Campus, opened in 2018 at 982 Rim Klong Samsen Road, Bang Kapi, Huai Khwang District, Bangkok.

=== Headmasters ===
1. 2003–2005 Stuart Morris
2. 2005–2017 Stephen Holroyd
3. 2017–2022 Christopher Seal
4. 2022–present Robert Millar (Riverside Campus)
5. 2018–present Amanda Dennison (City Campus)

== Curriculum ==
Shrewsbury's curriculum is based on the English National Curriculum. The curriculum provides structured learning from the age of 2 to 18 years. The Early Years Foundation stage (age 2 years) is followed by a sequence of 5 "Key Stages", culminating in the advanced A-level programme (ages 16–18).

== Tuition ==
Yearly tuition fees for the 2017–2018 school year range from 534,300 to 950,700 baht depending on grade level.

== Facilities ==
- Library, with 40,000 books
- Sixth Form Centre
- Auditorium called the Khunying Sumanee Memorial Hall, seating 590 people
- A recital hall
- Aquatics centre

== Student body ==
As of 2023, the school had 1,900 students at the Riverside Campus and 550 at City Campus. About 70 percent were Thai. United Kingdom students were the second largest group of students.

== Awards ==
- Winner of 2019 International School Awards ‘Outstanding Initiative that Supports Students’ Pathways to Higher Education’.

== Notable alumni ==
- Pangina Heals (drag queen), host of Drag Race Thailand
- Chittaphon Leechaiyapornkul (Ten), member of NCT, WayV and SuperM
- Myra Molloy (Myra), winner of Thailand's Got Talent season 1
- Parit Wacharasindhu, member of the House of Representatives
- Sawanya Paisarnpayak (Nana), actress
- Thapana Chongkolrattanaporn (Tad), member of ATLAS
- Vorameth Kornubrabhan (Victor), member of Proxie
- Tytan Teepprasan (born 1999), singer, songwriter, and actor

== Accreditations ==
The school is accredited by the Council for International Schools and ONESQA. It is also affiliated to the Federation of British International Schools in Asia (FOBISIA) and is a member of the Headmasters’ and Headmistresses’ Conference (HMC).
