= Nat Indrapana =

Thai sports executive (1938–2018)

- ณัฐ อินทรปาณ
- Born: 6 March 1938; Bangkok, Thailand
- Died: 6 August 2018 (aged 80); Bangkok, Thailand
- Education: Assumption College; California State University
- Occupation: Member of the International Olympic Committee

Nat Indrapana (Thai: ณัฐ อินทรปาณ; 6 March 1938 – 6 August 2018) was a Thai sports executive. He was also a member of the International Olympic Committee from 1990 until his death.

He had a Bachelor and Master of Science degrees in Physical Education from California State University, and also a Doctor of Philosophy degree in Physical Education from the University of Alberta, Canada.

Early on, he was Chairman of the Technical Committee of the Organising Committee for the Asian Games Bangkok 1978. In 1995, he was Chairman of Venues for the Southeast Asian Games Chiang Mai. In 1998, he was then a member of the Organising Committee for the Asian Games Bangkok.

In 2015, he became a member of the Culture and Olympic Heritage Commission. Before that, he was on the Eligibility Commission from 1992 until 1998, the Radio and Television Commission from 1993 and 1996 and then from 2002 until 2004, and Culture and Olympic Education Committee from 1999 to 2015, and the Olympic Programme Committee from 2005 until 2013. From 2007 until 2008, he was Thailand's vice-minister of Tourism and Sports.

After his death, the Olympic flag was flown at half-mast for three days at IOC headquarters.
