= Kaiwan Wattanakrai =

Thai voice actor (1951–2022)

- ไกวัล วัฒนไกร
- Born: 8 April 1951; Sam Chuk, Suphan Buri, Thailand
- Died: 28 June 2022 (aged 71); Sam Chuk, Suphan Buri, Thailand
- Occupation: Voice actor
- Years active: 1972–2022

Kaiwan Wattanakrai (Thai: ไกวัล วัฒนไกร; RTGS: Kaiwan Watthanakrai; 8 April 1951 – 28 June 2022) was a Thai voice actor who appeared in various Thai dubbed versions of Japanese anime and tokusatsu, working for MCOT HD and Dream Express (DEX). He was regarded as one of the most important pioneers of the Thai voice acting industry and was credited with popularizing Thai-dubbed anime throughout Thailand in the 1980s and 1990s. His major roles include Master Roshi in Dragon Ball, Vegeta in Dragon Ball Z, Roronoa Zoro in One Piece, and Juzo Megure and Heiji Hattori in Detective Conan. Kaiwan was known for his distinctive voice and strong Suphan Buri accent.

== Filmography ==
=== Voice over roles ===
==== Anime ====
- Dragon Ball – Master Roshi
- Dragon Ball Z – Master Roshi, Vegeta, Yajirobe, Cell
- Mobile Suit Gundam Wing – Duo Maxwell
- Tokyo Babylon (Channel 9 dub) – Seishirō Sakurazuka
- Saint Seiya (Channel 9 dub) – Cygnus Hyoga, Phoenix Ikki
- Saint Seiya: Hades Chapter (Channel 9 dub) – Cygnus Hyoga, Phoenix Ikki, Libra Dogo, Gemini Saga
- Saint Seiya: The Lost Canvas (Channel 9 dub) – Libra Dogo, Pope Sage
- Revolutionary Girl Utena – Touga Kiryuu
- Kinnikuman (Channel 9 dub) – Terryman, Buffaloman
- Mirmo! (Channel 9 dub) – Hirai, Dark
- Ghost Sweeper Mikami (Channel 9 dub) – Doctor Chaos, Kazuhiro Karasu
- Sailor Moon (Channel 9 dub) – Professor Tomoe, Motoki Furuhata, Zoisite, Ail
- Ranma ½ (Channel 9 dub) – Happosai, Dr. Tofu Ono
- Yu Yu Hakusho (Channel 9 dub) – Hiei, Rando, Suzaku, Sakyo, Kuronue, Raizen
- Slam Dunk (Channel 9 dub) – Mito Yohe, Miyagi Ryota
- Fighting Spirit (Channel 9 dub) – Masaru Aoki, Takeshi Sendō
- Magic Knight Rayearth (Channel 9 dub) – Inouva
- Detective Conan – Megure Juzo, supporting characters
- Fist of the North Star – Raoh, supporting characters
- Yaiba – Tsukikage, Kumo-Otoko, Kotaro Fuma
- The Prince of Tennis – Kaidou Kaoru, Oishi Syuichirou
- Inazuma Eleven – Ryūgo Someoka
- Inuyasha – Koga, Ogunima, Myoga
- Shōnen Onmyōji – Guren
- Fairy Tail – Makarov Dreyar
- Zatch Bell! – Apollo, Brago
- Mobile Suit Gundam – Char Aznable
- Mobile Suit Zeta Gundam – Char Aznable/Quattro Bajeena
- Mobile Suit Gundam SEED – Rau Le Creuset, Dearka Elsman
- Mobile Suit Gundam SEED Destiny – Gilbert Durandal, Sting Oakley
- Mobile Suit Gundam 00 – Graham Aker, Johann Trinity, Ian Vashti, Andrei Smirnov
- Mobile Suit Gundam: Iron-Blooded Orphans – Nadi Yukinojo Kassapa, Naze Turbine, Chad Chadan
- Fighting Spirit – Ichirō Miyata, Genji Kamogawa, Masaru Aoki, Takeshi Sendō
- Detective Conan – Megure Juzo, Gin, Hattori Heiji, supporting characters
- Fullmetal Alchemist – Maes Hughes
- Kannazuki no Miko – Tsubasa, Yukihito
- Shin Mazinger Shougeki! Z Hen – Juzo Kabuto, Count Brocken, Boss
- Yakitate Japan – Ken Matsushiro
- City Hunter – Saeba Ryo
- Kinnikuman Nisei – Terry the Kid, Checkmate
- Inuyasha – Sesshomaru, Bankotsu, Myoga, Hakkaku
- Code Geass – Charles zi Britannia, General Bartley Asprius, Kyoshiro Tohdoh, Kanon Maldini, Yoshitaka Minami, Kanon Maldini, Luciano Bradley
- Slam Dunk – Sakuragi Hanamichi
- Fate/stay night – Archer, Gilgamesh
- Digimon Savers – Satsuma Rentarou
- Nadia: The Secret of Blue Water – Gargoyle, Hanson
- Fruits Basket – Hatori Sohma
- Tokyo Mew Mew – Ryou Shirogane, Kish
- Cyborg Kuro-chan – Narrator, Grandpa Fuji, Romeo, Hirosue
- One Piece – Roronoa Zoro, supporting characters
- Great Teacher Onizuka – Yoshito Kikuchi, Hiroshi Uchiyamada
- Gintama – Hijikata Toshiro
- Tiger & Bunny – Keith Goodman/Sky High, Yuri Petrov/Lunatic, Ben Jackson
- Saint Seiya – Phoenix Ikki, Libra Dohko, Sagittarius Aiolos, Unicorn Jabu, Lizard Misty
- Sgt. Frog – Sergeant Major Kululu (Ep. 206–358)

==== Tokusatsu dubbing ====
- Juukou B-Fighter as Daisaku Katagiri
- B-Fighter Kabuto as Masaru Osanai, Julio Rivera
- Madan Senki Ryukendo as Juushirou Fudou
- Ultraman as Shin Hayata
- Ultraman Taro as Shuuhei Aragaki, Yutaro Asahina, Narrator
- Ultraman Leo as Gen Otori, Narrator
- Ultraman Gaia as Gamu Takayama
- Ultraman Max as Ultraman Max, Kenzo Tomioka
- Kamen Rider as Takeshi Hongo
- Kamen Rider Kabuto as Sou Yaguruma, Tsurugi Kamishiro
- Kamen Rider Den-O as Yuto Sakurai, Kintaros, Owner
- Kamen Rider Kiva as Taiga Nobori, Mamoru Shima
- Kamen Rider W as Ryu Terui, Kirihiko Sudo
- Kamen Rider OOO as Maki Kiyoto, Gamel
- Kamen Rider Fourze as Mitsuaki Gamou, Shun Daimonji
- Kamen Rider Wizard as Wiseman
- Kamen Rider Gaim as Oren Pierre Alfonzo, DJ Sagara
- Kamen Rider Drive as Brain Roidmude
- Kamen Rider Ex-Aid as Kiriya Kujo, Masamune Dan

=== Live-action roles ===
- Sam Chuk (2009)
- Baan Phee Phop Reformation (2011)

== Death ==
On June 2, 2022, Kaiwan's nephew noticed that his uncle was displaying symptoms of jaundice. Concerned for his well-being, he promptly took him to Ramathibodi Hospital in Bangkok for medical attention. The doctors advised that Kaiwan needed to rest and take a break due to his condition. However, despite the doctor's recommendation and the concern expressed by relatives, Kaiwan remained preoccupied with his work commitments. He had a continuous stream of tasks, including performances, dubbing cartoons, and other professional obligations. However, despite his relatives' pleas for him to take time off, Kaiwan refused to heed their advice and continued to work tirelessly without allowing himself proper rest.

As a result of his relentless dedication, Kaiwan's health deteriorated, leading to episodes of seizures and trance-like symptoms on June 24, 2022. Recognizing the seriousness of the situation, his relatives came together to assist him and promptly brought him to Sam Chuk Hospital for treatment. Despite the medical staff's efforts, Kaiwan's condition worsened, ultimately resulting in his death. The doctor identified the cause of death as liver failure.
