= Prachin Buri radiation incident =

2023 radiation accident

A radiation incident occurred in Prachin Buri Province, Thailand on 10 March 2023, when a 25-kg cylinder (measuring 30 cm by 13 cm) containing radioactive caesium-137 was reported missing from a coal-fired energy plant in Tha Tum, Si Maha Phot district, during routine checks by staff. The radioactive material is used in measuring devices. National Power Plant 5A may have been experiencing this problem since 17 Feb 2023, but failed to report it to the police.

The Department of Disaster Prevention and Mitigation announced a reward of 100,000 baht for finding the capsule.

== Official response ==
On Sunday 19 March, radioactive substances were detected in bags containing 24 tonnes of furnace dust from a steel foundry in Kabin Buri that has not been named; the area was immediately cordoned off.

Some of the contaminated furnace dust was used as ground-fill inside the steelworks' compound. The Office of Atoms for Peace (OAP) has had the contaminated soil excavated and stored until it can be safely disposed of.

The Minister of Higher Education, Science, Research and Innovation, Anek Laothamatas, instructed the OAP to conduct further investigation in the surrounding area.

Although experts consider the contaminated dust to be linked to the missing cylinder, they are unable to confirm this, however caesium-137 is not found naturally and must be man-made.

Officials suspect that the metal may have been sold as scrap. Local police have said they will be looking into how the cylinder left the power plant and charges will be brought.

== Risk to public health ==
Public health and environmental safety concerns were raised about potential exposure to the radioactive substance, categorised as Class 3 by the International Atomic Energy Agency (IAEA). This means it can cause "permanent injury to a person who handled it, or were otherwise in contact with it for some hours. It could possibly, although it is unlikely, be fatal to be close to this amount of unshielded radioactive material for a period of days to weeks". With a half-life of 30 years there could be long-term effects. External exposure to large amounts of Cs-137 can cause burns, acute radiation sickness, and even death. Ingestion or inhalation allows the radioactive material to be distributed in the soft tissues, increasing cancer risk.

Staff at the steelworks were told to stop working and were given health checks. The Department of Disease Control, part of the Public Health Ministry, provided local residents with advice including avoiding any suspicious metal containers and washing their hands before eating or drinking. They were also required to register themselves with authorities. Those who had been exposed to radioactive substances were advised to clean their eyes with running water, wash their body and hair and change their clothes.

However, due to the contained nature of the steelworks facility, officials believe that none of the contaminated material has left the premises. In addition, the temperature of the smelting process would mean all caesium-137 would have been removed from the scrap metal.

At a press conference on 20 March 2023 it was reported that no contamination was detected in a 5-km radius around the metalworks. None of the 70 employees at the metalworks were found to be contaminated with the caesium-137 isotope or exhibited any significant symptoms. Officials say that there appears to be no risk to public health.
