= Nukul Prachuabmoh =

Thai politician (1929–2023)

Minister of Transport
- In office 10 June 1992 – 22 September 1992
- Preceded by: Banharn Silpa-archa
- Succeeded by: Winai Sompong
- In office 2 March 1991 – 22 March 1992
- Preceded by: Samak Sundaravej
- Succeeded by: Banharn Silpa-archa

Governor of the Bank of Thailand
- In office 1 November 1979 – 13 September 1984
- Preceded by: Sena Unakul
- Succeeded by: Kamjorn Satirakul

Personal details
- Born: 25 July 1929 Bang Saphan district, Siam
- Died: 5 February 2023 (aged 93)
- Education: Triam Udom Suksa School; University of Melbourne

Nukul Prachuabmoh (Thai: นุกูล ประจวบเหมาะ; 25 July 1929 – 5 February 2023) was a Thai economist and technocrat. He served as Minister of Transport from 1991 to March 1992 and again from June to September 1992. He was also governor of the Bank of Thailand from 1979 to 1984.

Nukul died on 5 February 2023, at the age of 93.
