= Chonthicha Jaengraew =

Student activist from Thailand

- ชลธิชา แจ้งเร็ว
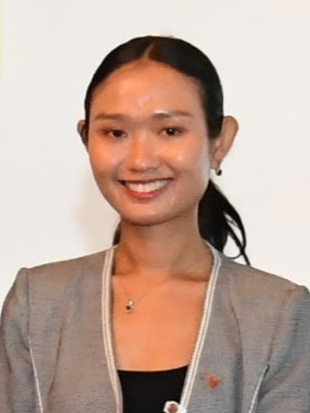

Member of the House of Representatives
- Incumbent
- Assumed office 14 May 2023

Personal details
- Born: 1995 (age 30–31)
- Party: Move Forward Party (2023–present)
- Education: Mahidol University
- Profession: Activist; politician

Chonthicha Jaengraew (or Jangrew; Thai: ชลธิชา แจ้งเร็ว, RTGS: Chonthicha Chaengreo; born 1995) is a Thai human rights defender, pro-democracy campaigner, Master's student at the Institute of Human Rights Peace studies, Mahidol University, and co-founder of the New Democracy Movement. She has been a prominent student activist for civil and political rights since the 2014 military coup and ensuing crackdown on civil society by the military government. Prior to the coup, Chonthicha was an environmental activist. Despite official restrictions, she and other students have continued to carry out small-scale peaceful protests calling for democracy, rule of law and an end to unlimited use of powers by the military government. As a result, she currently faces criminal proceedings and an unfair trial before a military and civilian court. Chonthicha has also faced online and offline harassment and threats.

She was one of the 14 students arrested by the police on 26 June 2015 after protesting during the first anniversary of the Thai military coup on 22 May 2015. After 12 days in detention, Chonthicha and her peers were released from jail on 8 July 2015; however, the charges against them stands.

Jaengraew has since been detained by authorities on multiple occasions for standing up to the junta, and demanding policies and measures that uphold democratic ideals and human rights.

Along with several other student activists arrested for peaceful protest in Thailand, Jaengraew is considered a prisoner of conscience and human rights defender by Amnesty International.

== Context ==
Following a coup on 22 May 2014, the military of Thailand took over the functions of government and established a junta.

On 1 April 2015, it was announced that Martial Law was lifted. The following Tuesday, the National Council for Peace and Order issued Order Number 3/2558 (3/2015) invoking Article 44 of the junta-drafted interim constitution. The order set out policies and measures that aims to "deal with actions intended to undermine or destroy peace and national security, violate notifications or orders of the NCPO, or to commit offenses under the laws on firearms, ammunition, explosives, fireworks and artificial weapons which threaten the peace and security of the nation." (Unofficial English translation of the order by iLaw, the Freedom of Expression Documentation Center)

Among the many contentious provisions in the order is Article 12 which bans any and all political gathering of five or more people.

== Student Activism and Freedom of Expression ==
Conthica Jaengraew was an environmental activist until the military coup in 2014. She has been working civil and political rights since 2014 military coup. She has organised small scale protests, together with other students concerning the rule of law, democracy and to call for the ending of unlimited use of powers by the military government.

=== The First Anniversary of the Thai Military Coup ===
On 22 May 2015, the first anniversary of the coup, Chonthicha along with many more students joined peaceful, symbolic actions calling for an end to the junta rule in the country. During these protests, police detained more than 30 students and activists in Bangkok and Khon Kaen, northeastern Thailand, belonging to student groups and political groups like the Resistant Citizen and Dao Din. Accompanying these arrests were reports of unprovoked physical attacks from the police and detained students being denied access to lawyers.

On 19 June 2015, the authorities officially called on students and activists who participated in the protests to report to the police with a warning that should they fail to do so, they will be arrested for violating the ban on any political activity for the first anniversary of the Thai military coup.

On 24 and 25 June 2015, students including Chonthicha carried out two more peaceful protests. One of which was held in front of a police station in an attempt to submit a complaint of police assault in relation to the 22 May protests. The authorities refused to accept these complaints.

On 26 June 2015, at around 5:00pm, officers dressed in plain clothes, arrested Chonthicha and 13 other student-activists: Chatupat Boonyapatraksa, Anuwat Suntararak, Payu Boonsopon, Panupong Srithananuwat, Suvicha Tipangkorn, Supachai Pukrongploy, Wasant Satesit, Rattapol Supasupon, Rangsiman Rome, Songtham Kaewpanpruk, Chonthicha Jaengraew, Apisit Sapnapapan, Pakorn Areekul, and Pornchai Yuanyee after a military court warrant charging them of violating the ban on political gatherings under Order Number 3/2015 and sedition under Section 116 of the Thai Penal Code, which allows for up to seven years’ imprisonment for anyone seeking to cause "unrest and disaffection... or to cause people to transgress the laws of the country."

Peaceful protests in Bangkok, were marred by violence, as observed by Human Rights Watch. 'The security forces beat, kicked, and slapped the demonstrators without provocation. Some members of the security forces lifted the students up and threw them on the ground. Others grabbed the students by their hair and dragged them away. Kaewpanpruk, one of the students facing charges, was sent to the hospital for emergency treatment after he was found lying unconscious on the ground'.

After 12 days of detainment, and after the Bangkok Military Court denied the police request to extend their detention, the 14 students were released on 08 July 2015. However, the charges against the students have not been dropped.

In 2018, she faced charges of breaching the ban on political gatherings of five or more. She was arrested because of her leadership of the New Democracy Movement who was reported to have participated in the protest calling for a general election. Six other student activists were arrested.

She has faced online and offline harassment and threats.

=== Global Solidarity ===
The release of the 14 Thai students came after international condemnation of their arrest and the state of freedom of expression in the country. Numerous individuals, youth groups, and non-governmental organizations (such as Amnesty International and Human Rights Watch) from Thailand and around the world called out the military government in statements and protests, wrote letters, shared poems, took photos, made music, and came together in solidarity for the cause and plight of the 14 Thai students.

The United Nations and the European Union also issued a call for the junta to drop all charges against the student-activists.

== Lèse majesté ==
On 27 May 2024, a court of first instance in Pathum Thani convicted her of lèse majesté and sentenced her to two-year imprisonment for the comments she made about King Vajiralongkorn in 2021. The court released her on bail pending appeal.

== See also ==
- Human rights in Thailand
- National Council for Peace and Order
