= Pinya Chuayplod =

Thai politician (1940–2022)

Member of the Senate of Thailand
- In office 22 March 2000 – 21 March 2006

Member of the House of Representatives of Thailand
- In office 1979–1992

Personal details
- Born: 9 April 1940 Phanom district, Thailand
- Died: 8 September 2022 (aged 82) Bangkok, Thailand
- Party: Justice Unity Party; Social Action Party
- Education: Thammasat University

Pinya Chuayplod (Thai: ภิญญา ช่วยปลอด; 9 April 1940 – 8 September 2022) was a Thai politician. A member of the Justice Unity Party and the Social Action Party, he served in the House of Representatives from 1979 to 1992 and the Senate from 2000 to 2006.

Chuayplod died in Bangkok on 8 September 2022, at the age of 82.
