= Upakit Pachariyangkun =

- อุปกิต ปาจรียางกูร

Senator of Thailand
- Incumbent
- Assumed office 14 May 2019

Personal details
- Born: 28 October 1961 (age 64)
- Spouse: Pareena Kraikupt (div.)
- Relations: Dean Young Gultala
- Children: Four, including Adisara Gultula
- Parent: Upadit Pachariyangkun
- Education: Skidmore College; Vrije Universiteit Brussel
- Occupation: Businessman

Upakit Pachariyangkun (Thai: อุปกิต ปาจรียางกูร; also spelt Uppakit Pachareeyangkun; born 28 October 1961) is a Thai businessman and senator, known for serving as chairman of United Power of Asia and Allure Group. He was appointed by Thailand's military junta, the National Council for Peace and Order, as a Senator of Thailand on May 24, 2019. In 2019, Upakit declared assets worth US$52 million, making him as one of Thailand's wealthiest senator.

== Early life and education ==
Upakit was born on October 28, 1961, to Upadit Pachariyangkun, a Thai diplomat and former foreign affairs minister, and his wife Aphira. Upakit attended Skidmore College in New York, where he earned a Bachelor's degree in political science. He subsequently obtained a Master's degree in Industrial Development from Vrije Universiteit Brussel. He then joined the Ministry of Foreign Affairs.

== Business interests ==
=== Business interests in Myanmar ===
Upakit founded Allure Group in Thailand. Upakit expanded his business interests to neighbouring Myanmar through a partnership with Tun Min Latt, a Burmese businessman. In 1999, the two men co-founded Myanmar Allure Group to operate Allure Resort, an illegal hotel and casino, in the Burmese-Thai border town of Tachileik. Six percent of the casino's income was distributed to the Myanmar Armed Forces. In August 2019, he divested from Myanmar Allure, reportedly selling casino resort for $8.15 million to a business partner, Chakris Kajkumjorndej, in order to join the Senate of Thailand. Dean Young Gultula, Upakit's son-in-law, was named his successor.

In his recent interview, February, 2025, Mr. Upakit confirmed that he has not been involved with Allure Group since 2019, as he was appointed as a senator. He sold the hotel, which was part of his business group, to Mr. Tun Min Latt. Initially, the transfer was made under the name of his son-in-law to prepare for the details of the transaction. Once everything was finalized, a sales contract was signed, and the ownership was transferred to the buyer. As for the electric power business, the concession rights were transferred to a new concessionaire, who continued using the name Allure Group, and added “(P&E) Power and Electricity”

=== Criminal scrutiny ===
On September 17, 2022, following a police raid, Thai authorities arrested Tun Min Latt, Dean Young Gultula, and two Thai nationals on money laundering and drug trafficking charges. Authorities seized $40.7 million worth in assets, including luxury cars, watches and bags, along with $239,091 in cash. On 3 October, Thai news outlets reported that the Criminal Court of Thailand had issued an arrest warrant for Upakit in connection with the raid. Within hours, Upakit's arrest warrant was abruptly overturned, and court summons were instead issued, after interference by leadership at the Criminal Court. Following the arrests, Metropolitan Police Bureau officers who had sought Upakit's arrest warrant were mysteriously transferred to remote provincial posts. Kritsanat Thanasupanat, the lead investigator, was involuntarily transferred to a remote post in Chaiyaphum province.

On March 12, 2023, Pol Lt Gen Archayon Kraithong, spokesman of the Royal Thai Police Office, clarified that the transfer of the police team handling the “Tun Min Latt” case is in accordance with legal frameworks, and the relevant authorities made the decision based on suitability.

On February 15, 2023, during a parliamentary debate, Rangsiman Rome implicated Upakit in a money laundering and drug trafficking case involving Upakit's son-in-law and Tun Min Latt. At a press conference thereafter, Rangsit accused Upakit of falsely declaring his assets before assuming his senate seat in 2019. Upakit owns the plot of land in Bangkok which houses the headquarters of the United Thai Nation Party.

On March 11, the Thai Judicial Commission's testimony from Manapong Wongpiwat, a police investigator, regarding Upakit's revoked arrest warrant was leaked to the media. The leaked testimony prompted concerns regarding internal interference by Criminal Court leadership in stopping Upakit's arrest warrant, and the state of judicial independence in Thailand.

On March 13, Damrongsak Kittiprapas, head of the Royal Thai Police, ordered a probe into irregularities surrounding the sudden revocation of Upakit's arrest warrant back in October. The following day, Chotiwat Luengprasert, the president of the Supreme Court of Thailand, launched a fact-finding committee to conduct a formal investigation.

On March 17, Mr. Upakit held a press conference to counter allegations made by Move Forward Party MP Rangsiman Rome that linked him to the Myanmar drug suspect.He denied laundering money from the drug trade through an electricity supply business operating on the Thai-Myanmar border. He questioned whether there was a conspiracy theory to bring the case to public attention for political gain.

On May 18, he was indicted on money laundering and transnational related charges by public prosecutors.

On October 9, in senator meeting he expressed the intention that he ready to go to the judicial process.

On March 25, 2024, he debated that he became a victim of unjust and malicious justice.

On January 30, 2024, the Criminal Court has acquitted Myanmar tycoon Tun Min Latt, a son-in-law of Senator Upakit Pachirangkun and three others of drug trafficking, money laundering and other charges, saying the evidence gathered by police was insufficient to show wrongdoing. Thai local media reported that the outcome of this case may indicate a positive trend for the charge of Mr. Upakit.

== Personal life ==
Upakit's father, Upadit Pachariyangkun, is a former diplomat and Thai foreign affairs minister. He has one sister, Thawadee. Upakit was previously married to Pareena Kraikupt, a politician.
