= Tun Min Latt =

- ထွန်းမင်းလတ်
- Born: 6 February 1969 (age 56); Rangoon, Burma
- Occupation: Businessman
- Organization: Star Sapphire Group of Companies
- Spouse: Win Min Soe
- Children: Nyan Min Latt; Shane Min Latt
- Parent(s): Khin Maung Latt; Win Kyi

Tun Min Latt (Burmese: ထွန်းမင်းလတ်; born 6 February 1969) is a Burmese businessman associated with the Star Sapphire Group of Companies. He is known for his close ties to the Myanmar's junta leader, Min Aung Hlaing, and is an arms dealer for the Burmese military.

== Early life and education ==
Tun Min Latt was born in Rangoon, Burma on 6 February 1969 to Khin Maung Latt and Win Kyi. His father Khin Maung Latt is a retired lieutenant-colonel in the Myanmar Air Force and former director-general at the Myanmar Ministry of Hotels and Tourism.

== Business interests ==
Tun Min Latt runs the Star Sapphire Group of Companies, a local conglomerate, with interests in casinos, hotels, mining and power companies. Star Sapphire has joint ventures with both of Myanmar's military-run conglomerates, Myanma Economic Holdings Limited and Myanmar Economic Corporation. Tun Min Latt runs several hotels in the Thai-Burmese border town of Tachileik in Shan State, including the Allure Resort casino. Six percent of the casino's income is distributed to the Myanmar Armed Forces. He expanded his business interests to neighbouring Thailand in partnership with Upakit Pachariyangkun, a Thai senator.

In August 2022, the British government sanctioned Star Sapphire to limit the Burmese military's access to arms and revenue. In March 2023, the American government sanctioned Tun Min Latt, his wife, and his associated companies.

In September 2022, Thai authorities arrested Tun Min Latt and three Thai nationals, including the son-in-law of Thai senator Upakit Pachariyangkun, on money laundering and drug trafficking charges, following a police raid. Thai authorities posit that Tun Min Latt laundered funds derived from illicit drug sales and converted the money into electricity commodities that were then exported to Myanmar through Upakit's Allure Group (P&E). Following the arrests, Kritsanat Thanasupanat, lead investigator of the Metropolitan Police Bureau, was involuntarily transferred to a remote post in Chaiyaphum province.

During the September 2022 raid of Tun Min Latt's Bangkok apartment, authorities seized US$40 million in assets, including luxury cars, watches and bags. Tun Min Latt is closely associated with Min Aung Hlaing and his family. The raid unearthed $1 million in assets owned by Min Aung Hlaing's children, including Aung Pyae Sone's title to a Bangkok property, and Khin Thiri Thet Mon's bank records. On 30 January 2024, Criminal Court of Thailand acquitted Tun Min Latt on charges of drug trafficking and money laundering, citing insufficient evidence to prove the charges.

== Personal life ==
Tun Min Latt is married to Win Min Soe (b. 1969), and has two children.
