= 14th floor case =

2020s Thai legal case

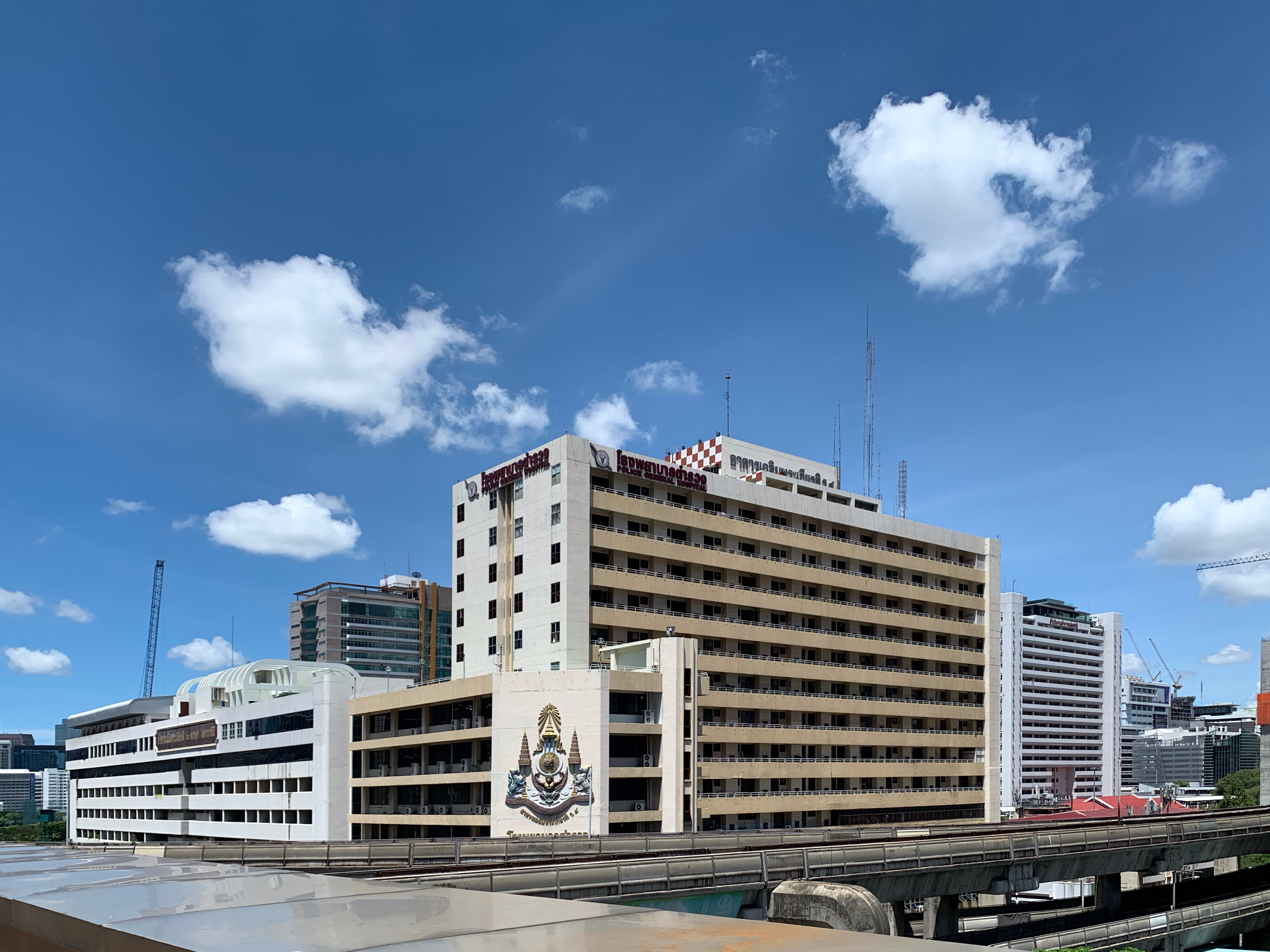
- The Police General Hospital (pictured here in 2020) where Thaksin resided at on the 14th floor
- Court: Supreme Court's Criminal Division for Holders of Political Positions
- Started: 30 April 2025
- Decided: 9 September 2025
- Verdict: Thaksin Shinawatra must serve his 1-year sentence

The 14th floor case is a legal case revolving around Thaksin Shinawatra's (Prime Minister of Thailand from 2001 to 2006) stay at the 14th floor of the Police General Hospital (PGH) in Bangkok in 2023 and 2024, following his return to Thailand after 15 years in exile. The case resulted in the Supreme Court ordering Thaksin to serve his one-year prison sentence in 2025.

After being ousted as PM by a military coup in 2006, Thaksin briefly went into exile before returning in 2007. He fled Thailand again in 2008 when the Supreme Court found him guilty for corruption and sentenced him to 8 years in prison in absentia. During his 15 years in exile, Thaksin continued to wield considerable influence over the successor parties of his Thai Rak Thai party. Following a political deal with conservative parties, Thaksin returned to Thailand in 2023 and spent 12 hours in prison before being transferred to the Police General Hospital. His 8-year sentence was commuted to 1-year by King Vajiralongkorn and he was released on parole after 6 months, subsequently being pardoned by the King. Thaksin continued to influence Thai politics during the premiership of Srettha Thavisin and daughter Paetongtarn Shinawatra.

Thaksin's transfer and stay at the hospital was controversial, with Thaksin being accused of receiving preferential treatment. Investigations in 2025 by the Medical Council of Thailand saw some involved doctors penalised, whilst the Supreme Court began holding hearings on the case in July 2025. Following the dismissal of Paetongtarn as PM, Thaksin briefly left Thailand before the verdict was delivered. On 9 September 2025, the Supreme Court's Criminal Division for Holders of Political Positions ruled that Thaksin's transfer to the hospital was illegal and that he must serve his one-year sentence. He was subsequently sent back to Klong Prem prison to serve his 1-year sentence, making him the first Thai PM to serve a prison sentence. After 8 months, Thaksin was released on parole on 11 May 2026 with a parole period ending in September 2026, but received a royal pardon on June 9 thereby ending his parole.

== Background ==
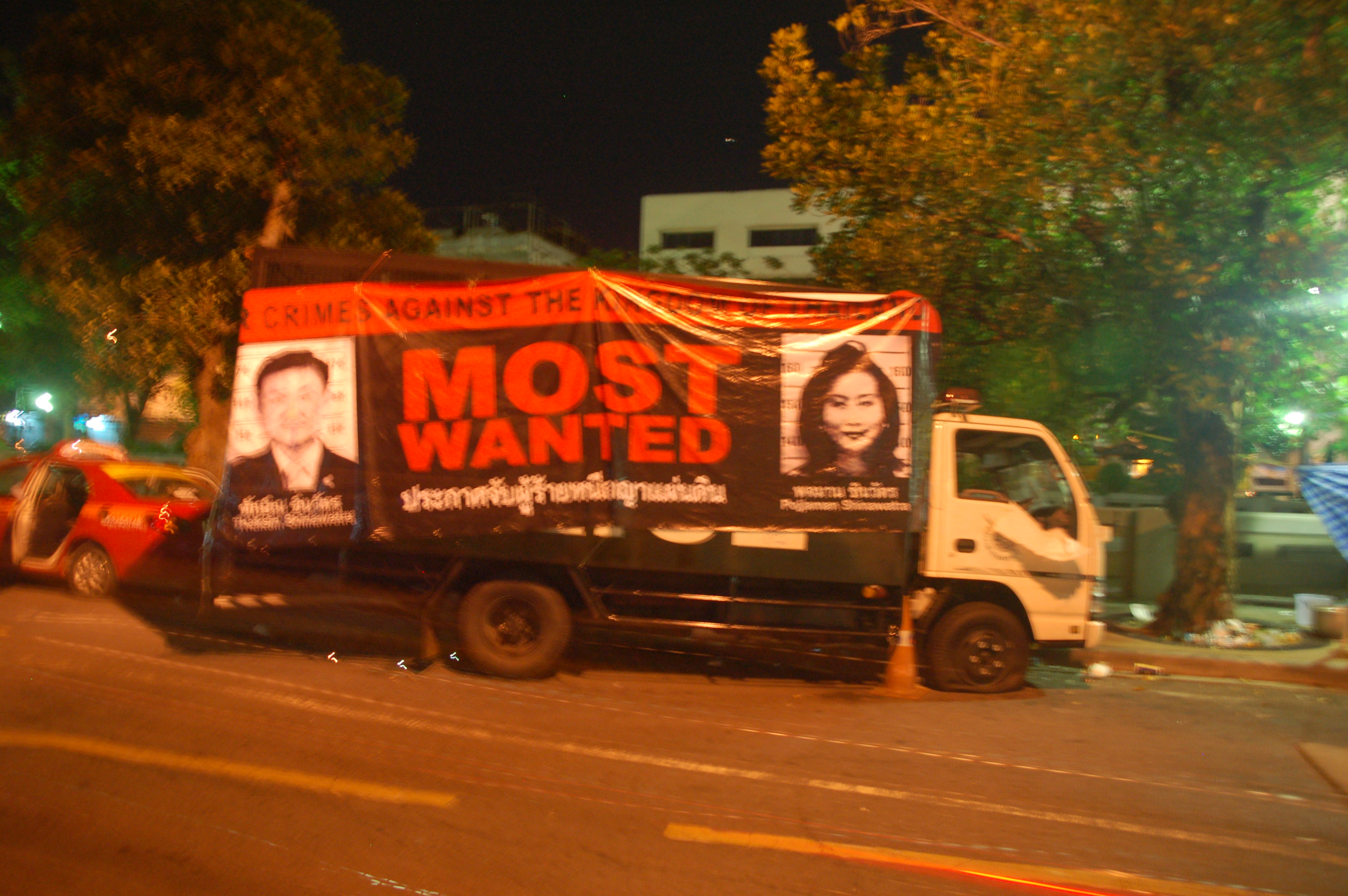
Thai police truck in 2008 with a Thaksin-Potjaman arrest warrant banner.

Thaksin served as the prime minister of Thailand from 2001 and 2006 after his party, the Thai Rak Thai Party, won the 2001 election. During his premiership, Thaksin came into conflict with the conservative royalist establishment. Additionally, the Corruption Commission found that he failed to declare all of his wealth and assets. Despite these pressures and other controversies, the backing of the rural 'Red Shirts' allowed the Thai Rak Thai to win a majority of seats in the 2005 election. His supporters came into conflict with the royalist 'Yellow Shirts'. In early 2006, Thaksin and his family decided to sell its shares in Shin Corp, Thailand's largest telecom group then, for $1.9 billion that led to widespread criticism from the urban population. They criticised Thaksin's handing over of important assets to Singaporeans and his avoidance of taxes. A snap election was called for in 2006 but boycotted by the major opposition parties. In response, Thaksin briefly left office between April and May before returning to the premiership. Whilst he was on a trip to the United Kingdom, a military coup deposed Thaksin as Prime Minister in 2006. Following the victory of his allies in the 2007 election, Thaksin returned to Thailand but faced various corruption charges from the courts empowered by the military. The Supreme Court found Thaksin guilty of corruption, and both he and his wife Potjaman received jail sentences. In 2008, Thaksin fled Thailand and went into self-imposed exile where he spent his time mainly in London or Dubai.

Despite being in exile, Thaksin continued to exert his influence onto Thai politics through the Thai Rak Thai's successor parties, the People's Power and Pheu Thai Parties. In 2011, his sister Yingluck was elected as Prime Minister but was ousted in 2014 by a military coup.

== Thaksin's return to Thailand ==
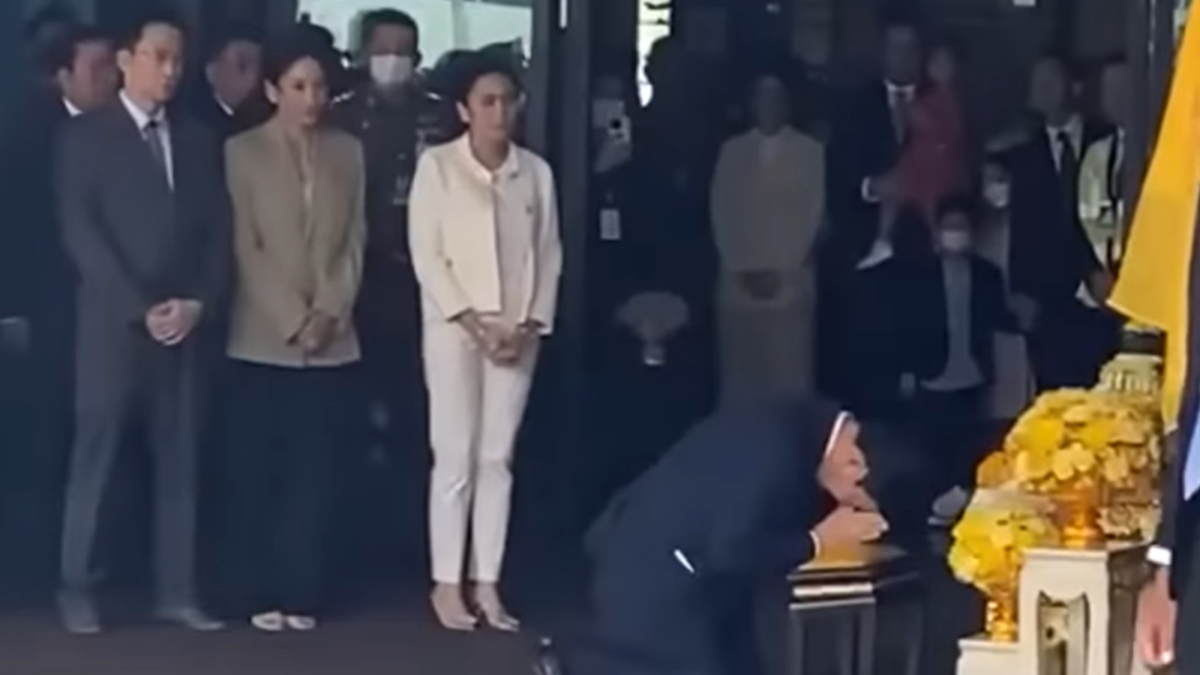
Thaksin paying homage to portraits of the King and Queen on 22 August 2023.

On 22 August 2023, Thaksin returned to Thailand via his private jet, ending 15 years of exile. At the airport, he was greeted by his two daughters Pintonga and Paethongtarn, and son Panthongtae, as well as hundreds of Red Shirt supporters. Outside the terminal, he paid his respects to portraits of King Vajiralongkorn and Queen Suthida. Thaksin was then taken to the Supreme Court where he was sentenced and sent to Klong Prem Central Prison to serve his 8-year sentence. Klong Prem prison authorities stated that Thaksin would be kept in a wing with special medical equipment owing to his age and would undergo a 10-day quarantine.

Hours after Thaksin's return, the House of Representatives elected Srettha Thavisin of the Pheu Thai Party as Prime Minister following the 2023 election. Srettha's election came as a result of a political deal which saw Pheu Thai enter into a coalition with conservative parties, including those who had strongly opposed the Shinawatra family, at the cost of the progressive Move Forward Party (MFP). Pheu Thai insisted that Thaksin's return was unrelated to the deal.

=== Time at the Police General Hospital ===
Thaksin's stay at Klong Prem lasted only 12 hours. In the early morning of 23 August, the Department of Corrections transferred Thaksin to the PGH as he was reportedly unable to sleep, was experiencing tightness in his chest, and had a high blood pressure and low oxygen readings. Doctors at Klong Prem tried to bring down his blood pressure, but decided to transfer him to the PGH. As an emergency, the Royal Thai Police were not informed in advance. According to Soponrat Singhajaru, the hospital's director-general, Thaksin's condition improved following his admission and that he was being monitored by six doctors. News of his transfer led to criticism, including from MFP MPs, that Thaksin was receiving special privileges. In response, Soponrat denied that Thaksin was getting any special care or that he had been placed in the VIP-ward of the hospital's 14th floor. Amidst rumours that Thaksin had been moved again to Phraram 9 hospital - which the Shinawatra family has shares in - Sahakarn Phetnarin, deputy permanent secretary for the Ministry of Justice, and Nassathee Thongplad, commander of Klong Phem, stated that he was still at the PGH on the 14th and that he will not be allowed to transfer to a private hospital.

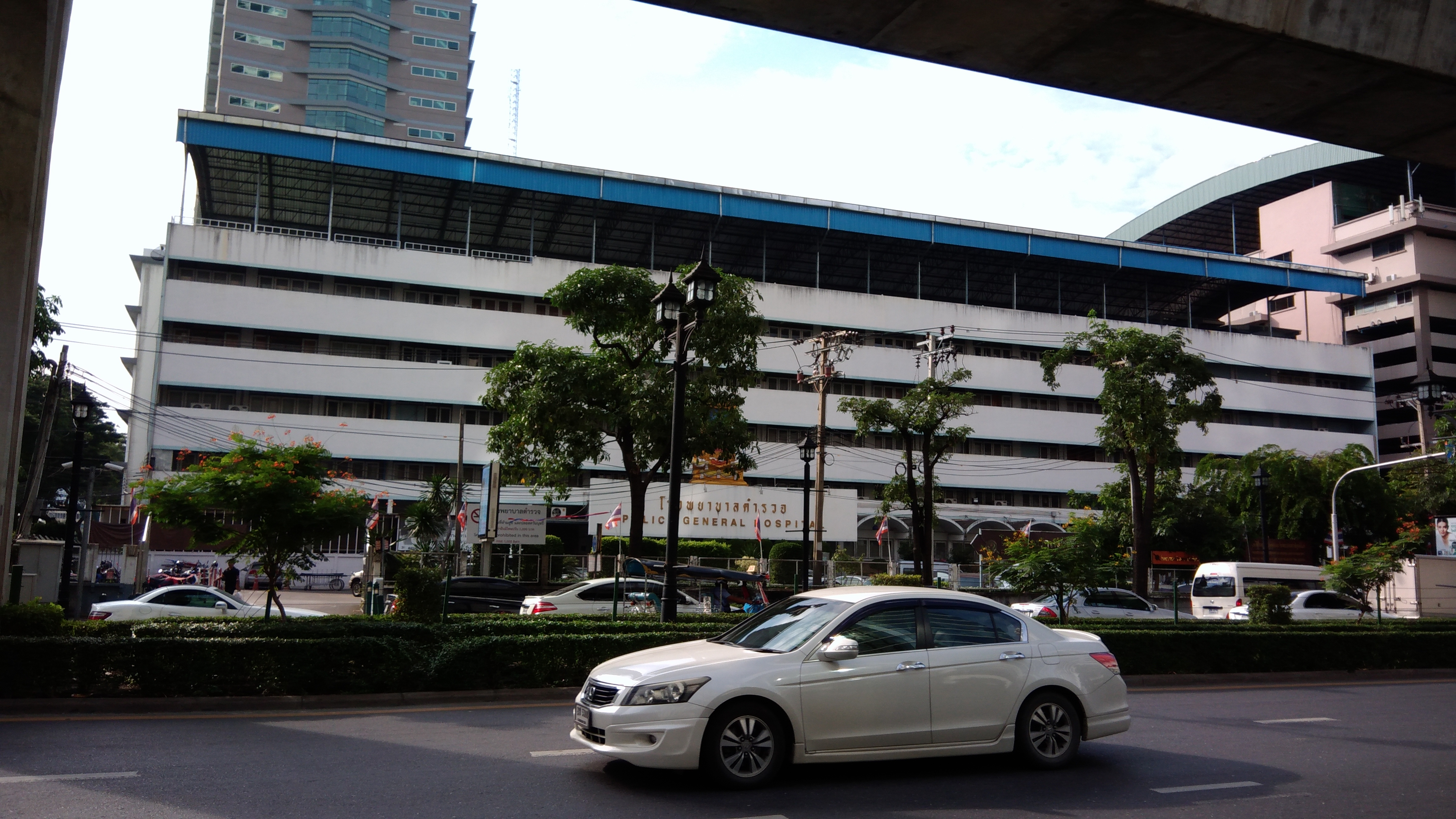
The Police General Hospital in 2017.

On 31 August, Thaksin submitted a request for a royal pardon. The following day King Vajiralongkorn commuted Thaksin's 8-year sentence to 1-year. The royal gazette published on 1 September stated that Thaksin as PM had "done good for the country and people and is loyal to the monarchy” and that “he respected the process, admitted his guilt, repented, accepted court verdicts. Right now, he is old, has illness that needs care from medical professionals.” Two months after his admission to the hospital, Sahakarn said that the Corrections Department would extend Thaksin's stay. Following the extension, Thaksin underwent orthopaedic surgery. His stay was again extended on 11 January 2024.

On 13 January, Thaksin was granted parole due to his age and illness. He was subsequently released from the hospital on 18 February, where he left in van for his family's residence at Chan Song La in Bangkok. Journalists at the hospital photographed Thaksin wearing a neck brace with his arm in a sling. His release was controversial, with a poll conducted by the National Institute of Development Administration finding that about 59% of those polled disagreeing with his release. Thaksin made his first public appearance in Chiang Mai on 14 March. His parole was intended to end on 31 August 2024, but was shortened by two weeks after he received a pardon on 17 August from the King as part of a group granted amnesty to mark the King's birthday. The pardon followed the election of Thaksin's daughter as PM following Srettha's dismissal.

== Investigation and trial ==
=== By the Medical Council ===
As a result of medical ethics complaints following Thaksin's transfer, an ad hoc subcommittee of the Medical Council of Thailand was formed and headed emeritus professor Amorn Leelarasamee. The committee began its investigation in December 2024, and received information from the PGH and Department of Corrections Hospital when investigating four doctors. The investigation found that there was a lack of conclusive evidence to validate that Thaksin was in a critical condition. The Medical Council then, on 8 May 2025, gave Dr Ruamthip Suphanan a formal warning and suspended the medical licences of Dr Sopnarush Singhajaru and Dr Taweesilp Wetchavitarn. The resolution was subsequently passed to Somsak Thepsuthin, who served as Minister of Public Health and the president of the Special Committee of the Medical Council. Somsak vetoed the Medical Council's ruling on 29 May, stating that the investigation missed key information and denied that he received any instructions from the Pheu Thai-led government. Somsak's veto was overridden by a two-thirds majority vote by the council on 12 July, who then launched a second ethics probe into five other doctors.

=== By the Supreme Court ===
Critics and opponents of Thaksin have frequently submitted petitions to both the Supreme Court and the Constitutional Court to investigate Thaksin's stay, all of which were dismissed. Former Democrat MP and anti-corruption activist Charnchai Issarasenarak filed three petitions over 14 months. In their dismissal of Charnchai's third petition, the Supreme Court acknowledged that they have “raised concerns over the enforcement of Thaksin's prison sentence” and this petition formed the basis of the Supreme Court's inquiry. On 30 April 2025, the Supreme Court's Criminal Division for Holders of Political Positions began a fact-finding inquiry into Thaksin's stay at the PGH. They ordered Thaksin, the Klong Prem prison chief, Director-General of the Department of Corrections (DOC), and the chief medical officer of the PGH to submit relevant evidence for a Supreme Court hearing on 13 June. This followed the Ombudsman's Office also ordering the DOC and relating agencies 30 days to explain their decision to let Thaksin stay at the PGH after being petitioned by the National Human Rights Commission. In May 2025, the Criminal Court gave a ruling that rejected Thaksin's request to travel to Qatar for a supposed meeting with American president Donald Trump. The ruling was upheld by the Appeal Court on 10 May, who said the travel dates were too close to his 13 June hearing.

Thaksin's legal team managed to receive an extension to the 30 days allowed for document submission, pushing it back to 23 June. Prior to the hearing, Thaksin stated that he would not attend as it wasn't required. In its first hearing on 13 June, the five judge panel issued orders to summon 20 witnesses, including involved doctors, nurses and prison officers, for subsequent hearings held on 4, 8, 15, 18 and 30 July. Throughout the entire investigation, a total of 31 witnesses were made to testify. In the 4 July hearing, the court heard from Dr Ruamthip Suphanan who conducted a physical examination of Thaksin at Klong Prem, Dr Notthaporn Piyasin who was the doctor on duty at the Klong Prem on 22 August 2023, Tanyapisit Khabuan who was the duty nurse on 22 August 2023, and medics Jirapon Meenuanchuen and Chamon Markchan who treated Thaksin. The 4 July hearing saw the witnesses questioned on Thaksin's transfer. The fourth hearing on 15 July saw the following witnesses testify: Sahakarn Phetnarin, Director-General of the DOC; Nasti Thongphlat, former director of Klong Prem; Sitthi Sutthiwong, former deputy director-General of the DOC; Charn Wachiradech, deputy director-general of the DOC; Dr Phongphak Areeyapinun; and Dr Watchai Mingbunjerduk. These witnesses were questioned on the procedure of Thaksin's transfer and the extension of his stay, as well as his health.

A fifth hearing was held on 18 July where four doctors (the attending doctor, the cardiac doctor who examined Thaksin, and two orthopaedic doctors who performed surgery) and two directors of the PGH were questioned about Thaksin's admission and health. Final hearings were held on 30 July 2025 where Wissanu Krea-ngam, Deputy Prime Minister between 2002 and 2006 and then 2014 and 2023, testified that Thaksin's transfers were carried out solely for security reasons and that Thaksin received no preferential treatment. The court then set 9 September as the date it will deliver its ruling. Concurrent to the hearings in July, Thaksin was also involved in a lese-majeste case over a 2015 interview he gave to a South Korean newspaper whilst in exile. He was acquitted in that case on 22 August.

== Sentencing ==
=== Flight from Thailand ===
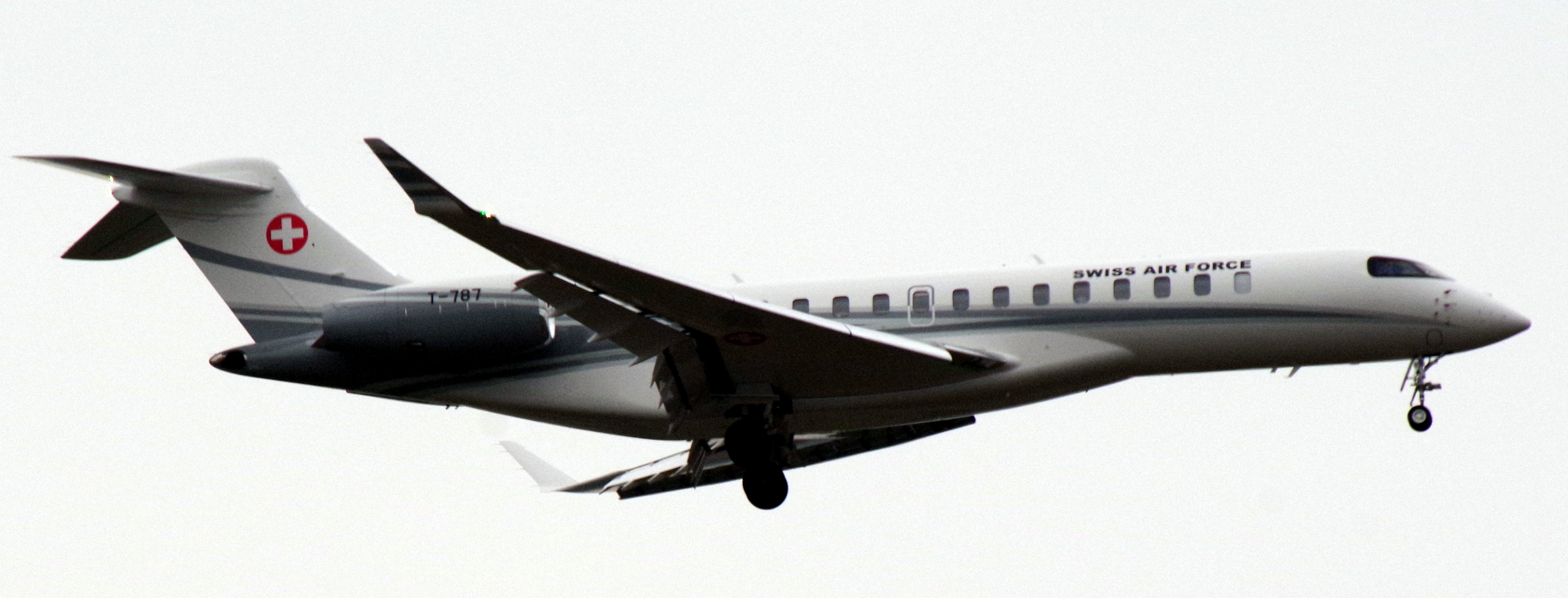
A Bombardier Global 7500 similar to Thaksin's T7-GTS.

Although Thaksin was acquitted in his lese-majeste case on 22 August, his daughter Paetongtarn was removed by the Constitutional Court as Prime Minister on 29 August. Thaksin's Pheu Thai party lost its power in government and was replaced by Anutin Charnvirakul from the conservative Bhumjaithai party on 7 September. Amidst this, Thaksin left Thailand via his private jet T7-GTS for Dubai on 4 September - five days prior to the Supreme Court delivering its verdict. The plane was originally intended Seletar Airport in Singapore. Immigration delays meant his plane left at 7:10 p.m. when it was scheduled to leave 6:35 p.m., meaning he could no longer land at Seletar since it closed at 10. The plane, having initially flown south, turned west and flew in two circles before heading towards Dubai. Thaksin stated that the reason for the trip was to receive medical treatment from doctors who treated him in exile and that he intended to be back in Thailand to appear at court.

Immigration police did not prevent Thaksin from leaving as had no outstanding arrest warrant or court order. The Supreme Court also rejected a petition by Issarasenarak that sought to prevent Thaksin from leaving owing to Chanchai not being a direct victim and lacking any legal standing. On 7 September, Thaksin returned by flying from Dubai to Singapore, before continuing to Don Mueang.

=== Verdict ===
On the morning of 9 September, the Supreme Court's Criminal Division for Holders of Political Positions delivered its verdict on black case number B.K. 1/2025 that Thaksin must serve his 1-year sentence in prison. It found that, although the director-general of DOC has the authority to transfer out of the prison inmates for medical treatment under the 2017 Prison Act and the Ministry of Corrections' regulations, transfer must follow a proper criterion. The court's findings found Thaksin's transfer to the 14th floor of the PGH to have been irregular and not in accordance with proper procedures. Drawing from several doctors, it also stated that Thaksin's health was manageable as a chronic condition and that he could have been returned within a few days. No surgery was performed on his spine or nerves, which allowed for Thaksin's stay at the PGH to be extended, but surgery did occur on his fingers. The court stated that he "knew or could perceive that he was not in a critical or emergency condition", and could've been treated as an outpatient. As Thaksin's commuted sentence was also never enforced, his stay at the PGH "cannot be deducted from the defendant's prison time" and he must serve a year of imprisonment. The five judge panel ruled unanimously on this verdict.

Thaksin, who had arrived at the court with Paetongtarn, accepted the court's verdict and was escorted to a police van outside of the Supreme Court building in Bangkok. Thaksin is the first Thai PM to go to jail. Shortly after the verdict, a statement made by him on social media stated that "even though I lose my physical freedom, I will still have freedom of thought for the benefit of my country and its people". He also vowed to stay strong and continue to serve Thailand, its monarchy and its people.

== Imprisonment ==
Thaksin was briefly held at the Bangkok Remand Prison before transferred to Klong Prem. He received Potjaman, Paetongtarn and Pintongta as his first visitors on 15 September. According to his family, Thaksin continues to suffer from health concerns such as a high blood pressure, hair loss and sleeping problems. On 29 September, his lawyer Winyat Chartmontree stated that Thaksin had submitted a petition for royal clemency to reduce his sentence. However, according Jakrapob Penkair who served as a minister to the Office of the Prime Minister under Samak Sundaravej, the process was cancelled with no further plans to seek clemency, his health is mostly good, and that he spent his time teaching other inmates.

== Release and parole ==
At 7:40 a.m. Indochina Time (UTC+7) on 11 May 2026, Thaksin was released on parole after serving 8-months in prison. A crowd of about 300 of his supporters had begun gathering outside Klong Prem in anticipation of his release since the day prior and were dressed in red shirts. Alongside them were some of his family members, including his two daughters Paetongtarn and Pingtonta, and son Panthongtae, as well as MPs and senior figures within the Pheu Thai Party. When Thaksin walked out, the crowd chanted "we love Thaksin" and gave red roses to him. He departed the prison without speaking to reporters. At 8:40 a.m., Thaksin arrived at the Bangkok Probation Office 1 in Bangkok Noi district to receive his electronic ankle monitor he is mandated to wear for the remaining 4-months of his sentence. In addition to the ankle monitor, the conditions of his parole stated that he must stay at his family's Chan Song La residence in west Bangkok unless given prior permission for relocation, and that he must report to a probation officer once a month. Thaksin arrived at the family's residence where his supporters and reporters had gathered. Outside of his residence, he said that he "was in hibernation; I can't remember anything now”. On 9 June 2026, Thaksin was pardoned under a royal pardon decree, after having his electronic monitoring device removed.
