= Shinawatra family =

Thai political family

Shinawatra ชินวัตร Saekhu
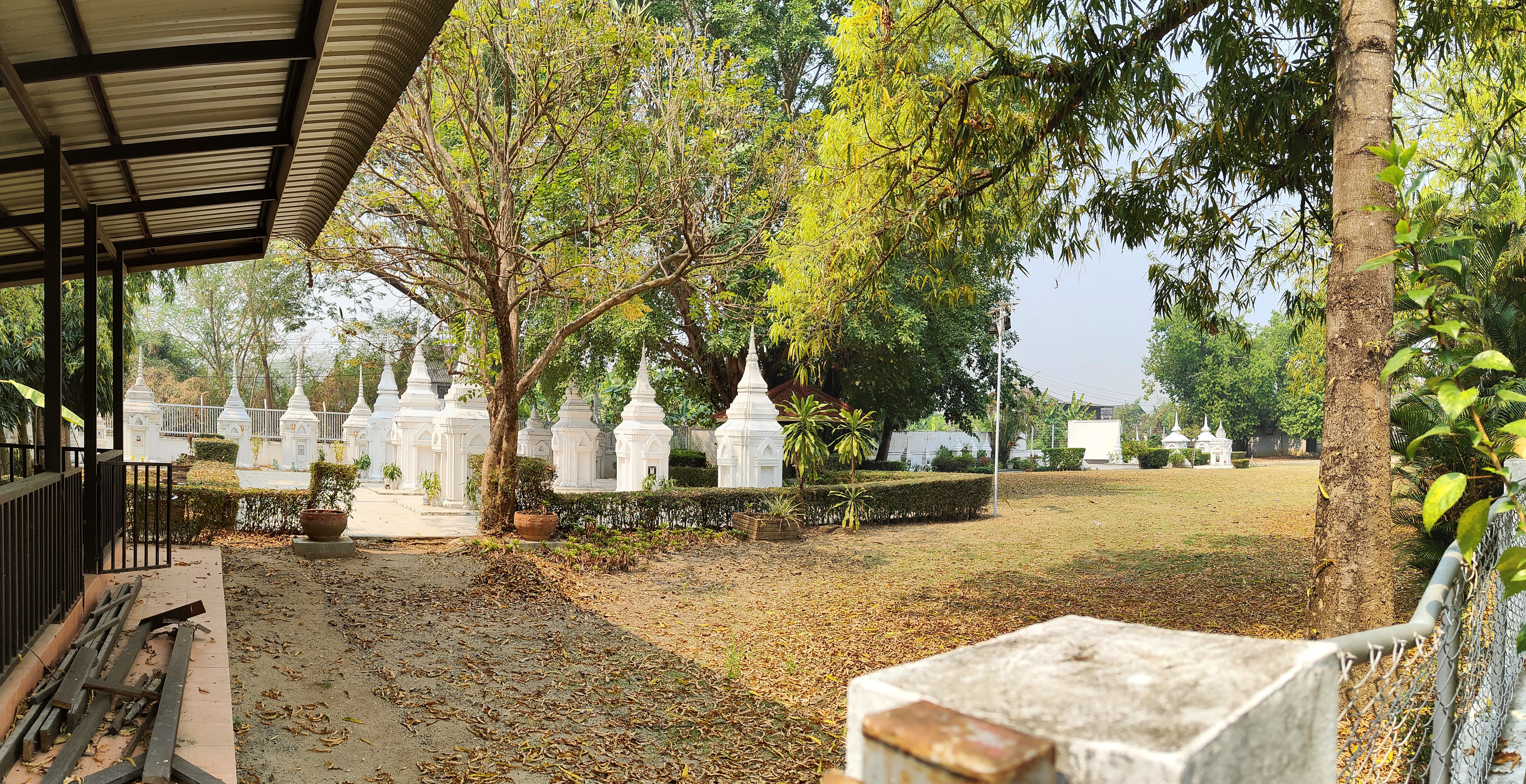
- Family cemetery in San Kamphaeng
- Parent family: Qiū family
- Current region: Chiang Mai
- Origin: Fengshun, Meizhou, Guangdong, China
- Founded: 1911; 115 years ago (Note: Death of Seng Saekhu); 1938; 88 years ago (Note: First use of the "Shinawatra" surname by Sak Shinawatra, Seng's grandson through his son Chiang)
- Founder: Chao Saekhu (first known member); Seng Saekhu (1911, immigrant); Sak Shinawatra (1938, adopted surname)
- Titles: Prime Minister of Thailand (2001–2006, 2008, 2011–2014, 2024–2025)
- Connected families: House of Na Chiengmai; Damapong family; Na Pombejra family; Wongsawat family

The Shinawatra family (Note: Pronounced /ʃɪnəˈwɒt/ shin-ə-WATT; Thai: ชินวัตร, RTGS: Chinnawat, pronounced [tɕʰīn.nā.wát].) is a highly influential Thai family of Chinese (Hakka) origin. The family built its initial wealth through the silk trade before significantly expanding into the telecommunications sector during the late 20th century. Thaksin Shinawatra, a former police officer turned billionaire, transitioned into politics by founding the Thai Rak Thai Party. He served as Prime Minister of Thailand from 2001 to 2006, becoming the first leader in Thai history to complete a full term and win a consecutive re-election in 2005. His leadership was marked by policies that prioritized rural development and healthcare, which secured a massive and loyal voting base, though his methods also drew strong criticism from the urban middle class and the traditional political establishment in Bangkok.

The political reach of the family has remained a dominant force in Thailand, producing a total of four Thai prime ministers. Following Thaksin's removal in a 2006 military coup not long after the controversial general election earlier that year, his brother-in-law, Somchai Wongsawat, held the office briefly in 2008 before a court ruling forced him to step down. In 2011, Thaksin's sister, Yingluck Shinawatra, was elected as Thailand's first female prime minister, serving until she was removed by a court order and a subsequent 2014 military coup. The family's influence returned to the highest level of government in 2024 with the election of Paetongtarn Shinawatra, Thaksin's youngest daughter, although she was later suspended and removed from office in 2025 following the Cambodia–Thailand phone call leak controversy.

== List of members ==
=== By blood ===
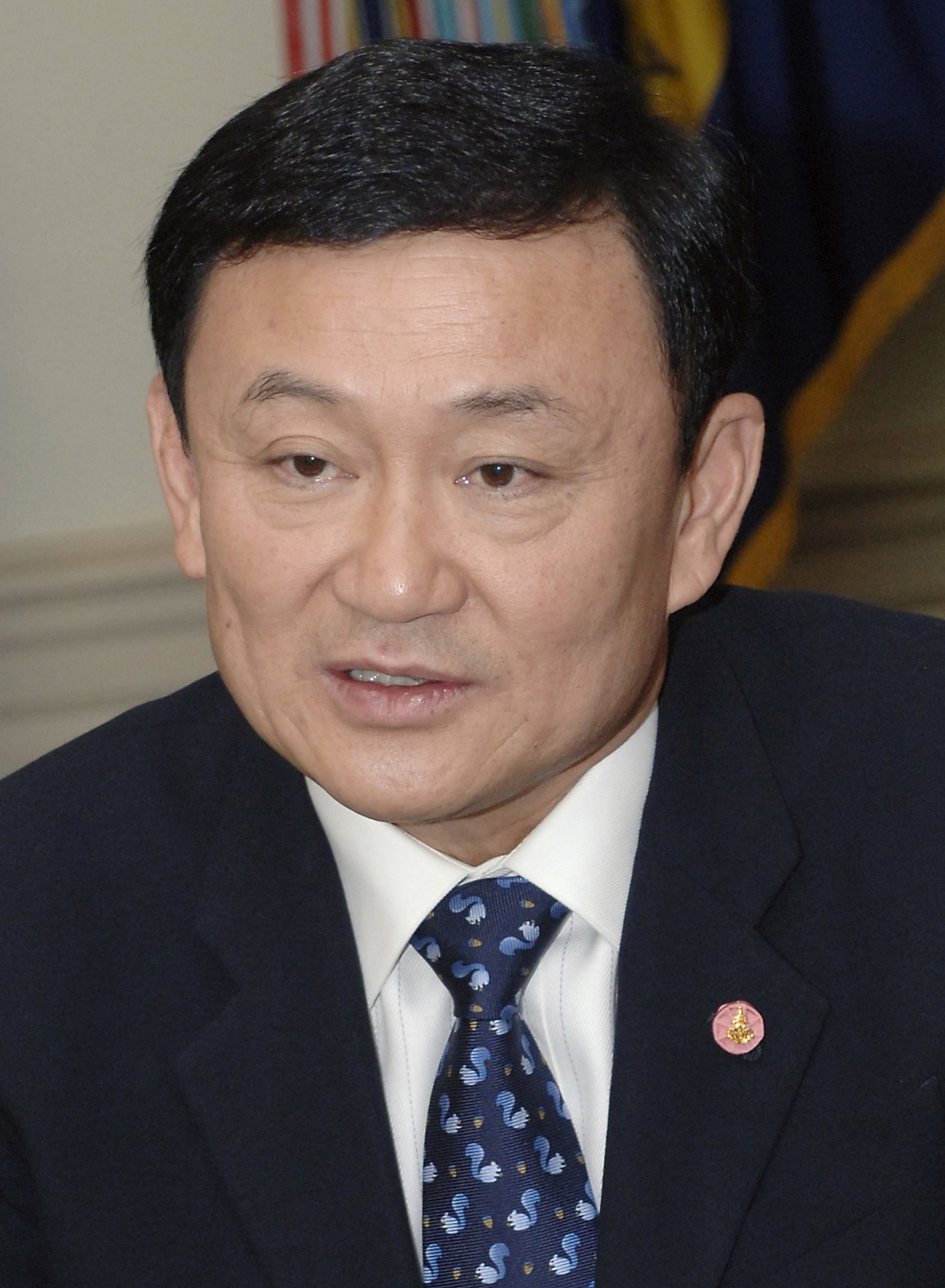
Thaksin in 2005

- Seng Sae Khu (born c. 1840), patriarch of the family, who was a Hakka immigrant to Siam (Thailand) and who made a fortune through various businesses
- Chaiyasit Shinawatra (born 1945), former commander-in-chief of the Royal Thai Army and Thaksin's cousin
- Thaksin Shinawatra (born 1949), former telecommunications billionaire, former Prime Minister of Thailand, and Seng Sae Khu's great-grandson
- Yingluck Shinawatra (born 1967), former Prime Minister of Thailand from 2011 to 2014 and Thaksin's sister
- Yaowaret Shinawatra, member of a subcommittee of the Education Council of Thailand, and Thaksin's sister
- Panthongtae Shinawatra (born 1979), businessman and Thaksin's son
- Pintongta Shinawatra (born 1982), businesswoman and Thaksin's daughter, chairman of Rende Development Co., Ltd.
- Paetongtarn Shinawatra (born 1986), businesswoman, Thaksin's daughter, Prime Minister of Thailand from 2024 until her removal in 2025

=== By marriage ===
- Somchai Wongsawat (born 1947), former Prime Minister of Thailand in 2008 and Thaksin's brother-in-law
- Yodchanan Wongsawat (born 1979), son of Somchai and nephew of Thaksin
- Potjaman Na Pombejra (born 1956), Thaksin's former wife

== Family tree of members ==
Shinawatra family tree

Seng Saekhu	Thongdi
Chiang Shinawatra
Loet Shinawatra
Potjaman Damapong	Thaksin Shinawatra	Yingluck Shinawatra	Anusorn Amornchat	Yaowapha Shinawatra	Somchai Wongsawat
Panthongtae Shinawatra	Pintongta Shinawatra	Paetongtarn Shinawatra

== See also ==
- Shinawatra University, private university in Thailand initiated by Thaksin Shinawatra
- 14th floor case
