= Loet Shinawatra =

Thai politician

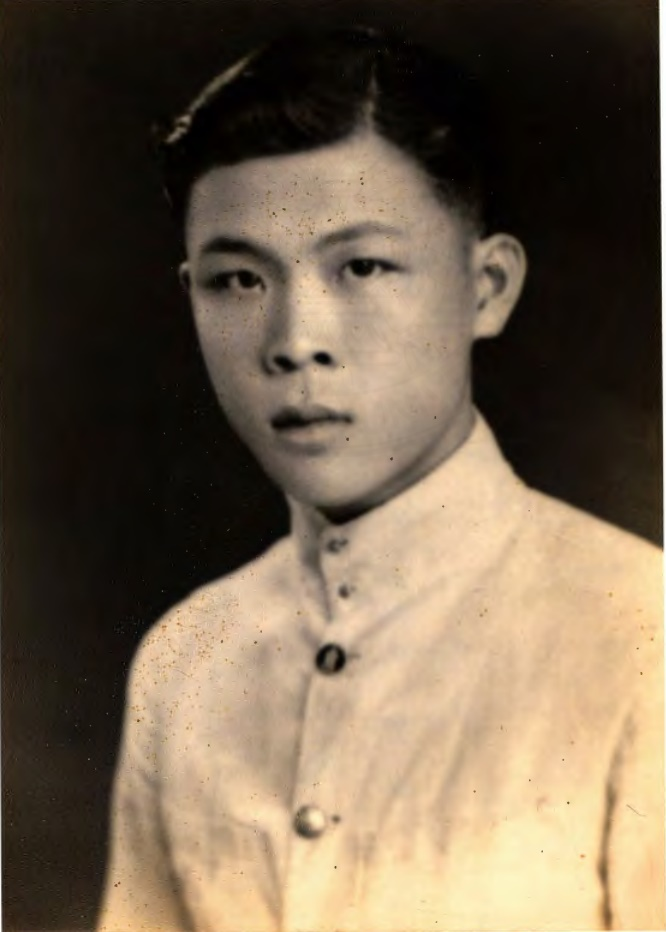
Loet Shinawatra

Loet Shinawatra (Thai: เลิศ ชินวัตร) (1919 – 1997) was a Thai politician who was elected as a member of the House of Representatives for Chiang Mai in 1969. The House was dissolved in 1971, and Shinawatra left politics in 1976. He is the father of Thaksin Shinawatra, the 23rd Prime Minister of Thailand, and Yingluck Shinawatra, the 28th Prime Minister of Thailand, and the paternal grandfather of Paetongtarn Shinawatra, the 31st Prime Minister of Thailand. He is also the father-in-law of Somchai Wongsawat, the 26th Prime Minister of Thailand, the husband of Yaowapa Wongsawat (Shinawatra) (Loet's daughter).

== Descendants ==
Loet Shinawatra married Yindi Shinawatra (née Ramingwong) and had 10 children

1. Yaovalak Klongkamnuankan married Subharoek Klongkamnuankan and had 2 children
2. Thaksin Shinawatra married Potjaman Na Pombejra and had 3 children
  1. Panthongtae Shinawatra married Natthiya Puangkham and had 2 children
  2. Pintongta Shinawatra married Natthaphong Kunakornwong and had 3 children
    1. Phinthara Kunakornwong
    2. Phinnara Kunakornwong
    3. Chinwakin Kunakornwong
  3. Paetongtarn Shinawatra married Pitaka Suksawat and had 2 children
    1. Thithan Suksawat
    2. Phrithasin Suksawat
3. Yaovaret Wongnaphachan married Veerachai Wongnaphachan and had 3 children
  1. Chayika Wongnaphachan
  2. Rattanaphon Wongnaphachan
  3. Thanawat Wongnaphachan
4. Piyanuch Limpatthanachat married Sanga Limpatthanachat
5. Udon Shinawatra married Dararatana Shinawatra and had 1 daughter
6. Yaovabha Wongsawat married Somchai Wongsawat and had 3 children
  1. Yodchanan Wongsawat
  2. Chinnicha Wongsawat
  3. Chayabha Wongsawat married Nam Lynal
7. Payab Shinawatra married Phoruthai Shinawatra (née Chandraphan) and had 4 sons
8. Monthathip Kowitcharoenkul married Dr. Somchai Kowitcharoenkul and had 2 children
9. Yingluck Shinawatra married Anusorn Amornchat and had 1 son
  1. Subhasekh Amornchat
10. Tasani Shinawatra
