= Prime Minister Shinawatra =

Prime Minister Shinawatra may refer to:

- Thaksin Shinawatra (born 1949), Thai businessman and politician, prime minister of Thailand 2001–2006
- Yingluck Shinawatra (born 1967), Thai businesswoman and politician, prime minister of Thailand 2011–2014
- Paetongtarn Shinawatra (born 1986), Thai businesswoman and politician, prime minister of Thailand 2024–present

== See also ==
- Shinawatra family
