= Seng Saekhu =

Patriarch of Shinawatra clan

- Born: Khu Chun Seng c. 1840s Fengshun County, Guangdong, Qing dynasty
- Died: c. 1911 (aged 62–71); San Kamphaeng, Chiang Mai, Siam
- Spouses: Thongdi (m. 1880; died 1910); Nocha (m. 1910)
- Children: 9
- Relatives: Shinawatra family

Seng Saekhu

Chinese name
- Chinese: 丘春盛
Transcriptions
Standard Mandarin
- Hanyu Pinyin: Qiū Chūnshèng
Hakka
- Romanization: Hiu^{1} Cun^{1} Siin^{5}
Southern Min
- Hokkien POJ: Khu Chhun-sēng
- Teochew Peng'im: Ku^{1} Cung^{1} Sêng^{6}

Thai name
- Thai: เส็ง แซ่คู
- RTGS: Seng Saekhu

Seng Saekhu (Note: Thai: เส็ง แซ่คู; RTGS: Seng Sae-khu) (c. 1840s – c. 1911) also known as Khu Chun Seng (Note: Chinese: 丘春盛; Teochew Pe̍h-ūe-jī: Khu Tshung-sĕng; Hokkien Pe̍h-ōe-jī: Khu Chhun-sēng; Thai: ชุ่นเส็ง แซ่คู; RTGS: Chunseng Sae-khu) or Nguanseng Saekhu (Note: Thai: ง่วนเส็ง แซ่คู; RTGS: Ngwn seng sae khū) was a Chinese–born Thai tax farmer and the patriarch of the Shinawatra family. He was the paternal grandfather of Loet Shinawatra, the patrilineal great-grandfather of former Thai prime ministers Thaksin Shinawatra and Yingluck Shinawatra, and the patrilineal great-great-grandfather of former prime minister Paetongtarn Shinawatra.

== Life ==
Seng was an ethnic Chinese of Hakka descent born around the 1840s in Taxia village, Fengshun County, Chaozhou Prefecture (now Fengshun, Meizhou, Guangdong) to Chao Saekhu (Chinese: 丘志勤).

Seng came to Siam in the 1860s together with his parents and second brother. However, as Seng's mother and second brother soon fell ill shortly arriving in Siam, his parents and brother returned to China, leaving Seng in the care of a local acquaintance. Seng spent his early years in Chanthaburi where he met his wife, a native Thai by the name of Thongdi. Their eldest son, Chiang Saekhu (Chinese: 丘阿昌), was born in 1890 around this time and Seng started his career as a tax farmer in this small town. When the land lease expired in 1900, Seng and his family moved to Talat Noi in Bangkok around 1900 where worked as a commercial trader. Seng and his family relocated to Chiang Mai around 1908 to resume his career as a tax farmer under the patronage of Nikhon Jinkit.

== Family ==
Seng married two wives; the first to Thongdi with whom he had 6 children, including Chiang. Thongdi died of a heart attack in 1910 due to a robbery incident, and Seng remarried another lady, Nocha with whom he had 3 children. Chiang married another Thai lady, Saeng Samana with whom they have 12 children. Chiang's second child and oldest son, Sak Shinawatra, adopted the Shinawatra surname in 1938, during Plaek Phibunsongkhram's anti-Chinese campaigns, and the rest of the clan followed suit. Sak Shinawatra became an army general and has four sons who all served in the army for at least sometime. Sak's third son, Chaiyasit Shinawatra became the commander-in-chief of the Royal Thai Army.

Chiang's fourth child and second son, Loet Shinawatra is the father of former prime ministers Thaksin and Yingluck Shinawatra. Loet served as an MP for Chiang Mai in 1969 and 1976 for the Thai Nation Party. Loet married Yindi Ramingwong, who is the daughter of a Hakka Chinese immigrant and his wife, a princess of the Lanna royalty.

== Bibliography ==
- Baker, Chris; Pasuk, Phongpaichit (2009). Thaksin: The Business of Politics in Thailand (second expanded ed.). Silkworm Books. ISBN 978-974-9575-55-0.
