= Tull Traisorat =

Thai diplomat

- ตุลย์ ไตรโสรัส

Ambassador of Thailand to Cambodia
- Incumbent
- Assumed office 2025
- Monarch: Vajiralongkorn
- Prime Minister: Paetongtarn Shinawatra
- Preceded by: Cherdkiat Atthakor

Tull Traisorat (Thai: ตุลย์ ไตรโสรัส) is a Thai diplomat, serving as Ambassador of Thailand to Cambodia since 2025. He previously served as Ambassador of Thailand to the Philippines from 2022 to 2025.

== Career ==
On 11 March 2025, Tull presented his credentials to Hun Sen, acting head of state and former prime minister of Cambodia.
