= Pintongta Shinawatra =

Thai businesswoman (born 1982)

Pintongta Shinawatra Kunakornwong RThBh
- พินทองทา ชินวัตร คุณากรวงศ์
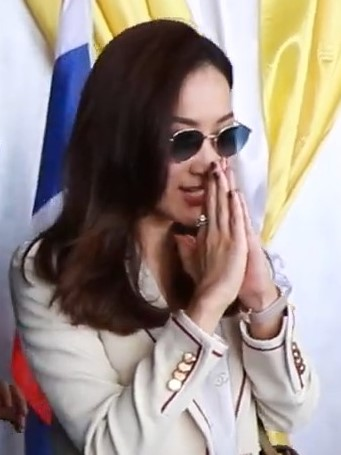
- Pintongta Shinawatra
- Born: 17 April 1982 (age 44); Bangkok, Thailand
- Other name: Aim (เอม)
- Education: Kasetsart University (BA); City, University of London (MSc)
- Occupation: Businesswoman
- Spouse: Natthaphong Kunakornwong (m. 2011)
- Children: 3
- Parents: Thaksin Shinawatra (father); Potjaman Na Pombejra (mother)
- Relatives: Shinawatra family

Pintongta Shinawatra Kunakornwong RThBh (Thai: พินทองทา ชินวัตร คุณากรวงศ์; born 14 April 1982) is a Thai businesswoman, the second child and oldest daughter of Thaksin Shinawatra, former Prime Minister of Thailand, and Potjaman Na Pombejra. Her older brother is businessman Panthongtae Shinawatra, and her younger sister is Paetongtarn Shinawatra, another former Prime Minister of Thailand. She completed her lower secondary education at St. Joseph Convent School and upper secondary education at Mater Dei School. She holds a Bachelor of Arts (Political Science, Public Administration) from the Faculty of Social Sciences, Kasetsart University, and a Master of Business Administration from Cass Business School, City, University of London.

Pintongta was formerly the Chief Executive Officer of Mancity Marketing Thailand Co., Ltd. and is currently a shareholder of SC Asset Public Company Limited, a Director of Thaicom Foundation and chairman of Rende Development Co., Ltd.

Pintongta is married to Nattaphong Kunakornwong, a real estate businessman and the older brother of Soraphan Kunakornwong, assistant secretary to the Minister of Transport, who currently holds the position of executive vice president of SC Asset Public Company Limited. Pintongta and Nattaphong had their engagement ceremony on the morning of 11 November 2011 and their wedding ceremony on 12 December 2011 at the Plaza Athenee Hotel. The couple currently have twin daughters born on 6 December 2014 and one son born on 29 November 2016.

== Royal decorations ==
- Thailand
  - 2005 – The Most Admirable Order of the Direkgunabhorn, 6th Class, Gold Medal (G.M.T.)
