= Digital wallet scheme =

Thai government scheme

- Logo of the Thang Rath app used in the scheme
- Country: Thailand
- Prime Minister(s): Srettha Thavisin (2023-2024); Paetongtarn Shinawatra (2024-2025)
- Ministry: Ministry of Finance
- Key people: Srettha Thavisin (Prime Minister, Minister of Finance); Julapun Amorvivat (Deputy Minister of Finance)
- Launched: 25 September 2024; 11 months ago Nationwide
- Status: Ongoing
- Website: digitalwallet.go.th

The digital wallet scheme is a government handout scheme created by the Thai government that aims to allow eligible Thai citizens to receive ฿10,000 (US$275) each through a digital wallet to spark economic growth. The scheme is the flagship policy of the Pheu Thai party and the Srettha and Paetongtarn governments. The handout of approximately ฿450 billion is estimated to reach 45 million registered people.

The scheme is designed to spark economic growth in Thailand's sluggish economy post-COVID-19 by increasing the country's GDP, growth and household purchasing power through promoting consumption at the local level amongst lower level income earners. It also aims to promote digitisation. Phase 1 of the scheme was launched on 25 September 2024, with the initial 14.2 million recipients being welfare card holders and the disabled. It has been criticised by economists who label it as costly and harmful to Thailand's economy.

== Eligibility and restrictions ==
Recipients must have been at least 16 years old by 30 September 2024 and a Thai citizen to receive the handout. The recipient's yearly income must also have been below ฿840,000 and their bank accounts must have contained less than ฿500,000 by 31 March 2025. The requirement of bank accounts applies to current, savings and fixed-deposit accounts, but not state bank savings lotteries or foreign currency deposits. Recipients must also not be currently serving out a prison sentence or have a prison sentence. Shop owners and people with a record of fraud are also excluded. Out of Thailand's population of around 67 million, the government estimated that about 50 million people were eligible for the scheme, although the Ministry of Finance estimated only 45 million people would register. A total of 36 million individuals registered in the first round.

After the ฿10,000 was distributed, there was a six-month time limit for spending the funds. The money could not be withdrawn as cash, but people who receive the handout in the first phase also received some of it in cash. There are also restrictions on where and what the money can be spent on. It can only be spent within the recipient's registered district and at participating businesses, which excludes major retail stores, wholesale outlets and department stores. Originally, the money could only be spent within a 4 kilometres (2.5 mi) radius around where they lived. However, an obstacle to this is that a large portion of the eligible population in urban centres like Bangkok and Chiang Mai are registered in other provinces.

Additionally, the money could not be spent on 18 items, which include alcohol, cannabis products, cash and souvenir vouchers, diamonds, electrical appliances, electronic equipment, fuel oil, gems, gold, kratom products, lotteries, natural gas, tobacco, services, or online products. There exists doubt over the government's ability to monitor spending and prevent the purchase of restricted items, although these restrictions are built into the digital wallet. An April survey by Siam Commercial Bank found around 40% of those surveyed intended to spend it on necessities such as food and health products. In the same survey, over 80% said they would redirect their personal income to make loan payments or invest in businesses while the handout money would be used for what their personal income would have bought.

== Financing ==
The Srettha government has frequently flip-flopped over how the scheme would be financed. The Pheu Thai party had proposed that it be funded through the budgets, but the new coalition government led by Srettha instead proposed a special parliament bill to request one-time borrowing. The bill was met with criticism by the Bank of Thailand, economists and the opposition Move Forward party. The government then sought to have it funded by the Bank for Agriculture and Agricultural Cooperatives (BAAC). However, the legality of this was in question as it could violate laws governing government saving banks.

This was then changed in favour of pulling money out of the governments 2024-2025 fiscal budget. This change was announced on 10 April 2024, where Prime Minister Srettha Thavisin said the scheme would be funded solely by the 2024-2025 fiscal budget. According to the Deputy Finance Minister Julapun Amorvivat, the needed ฿450 billion will be funded by ฿175 billion from the 2024 budget, ฿152.7 billion from the 2025 budget, and ฿172.3 billion from the BAAC's 2025 budget. The total cost also dropped from ฿500 to ฿450.

After phase 1 was launched on 25 September, Deputy Finance Minister Paopoom Rojanasakul announced that the government had sufficient funding for phase 2 to go ahead. Phase 1 had used ฿145 billion, with ฿180 billion already allocated to phase 2.

== Project history ==
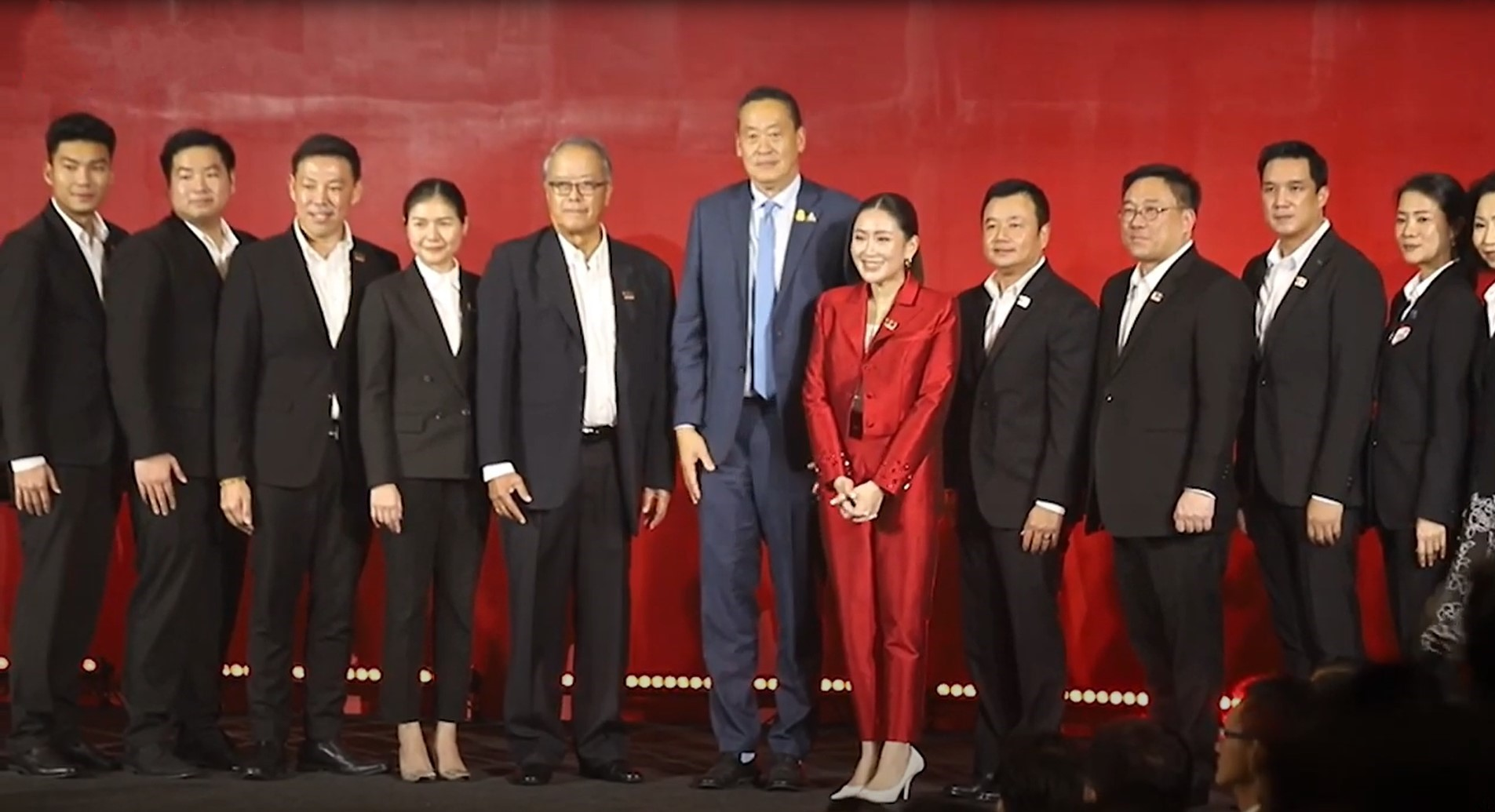
The Pheu Thai party's executive committee in 2023 with Prime Minister Srettha Thavisin and future Prime Minister Paetongtarn Shinawatra.

=== Background ===
Thailand's recovery from the COVID-19 pandemic and its effects has been slow. Thailand has the highest public debt to gross domestic ratio in Southeast Asia at over 64%.

The idea of the digital wallet scheme was first conceived by the Pheu Thai party in the leadup to the 2023 general election. During the election, it was one of the party's major campaign promises.

=== Under the Srettha government ===
The scheme was finalised by the National Digital Wallet Policy Committee headed by Srettha on 10 April with a planned roll out in the fourth quarter. The scheme was approved in principle by the Srettha cabinet on 23 April.

=== Under the Paetongtarn government ===
Srettha was dismissed as prime minister by the constitutional court on 14 August and succeeded by the leader of the Pheu Thai party and daughter of Thaksin Shinawatra, Paetongtarn Shinawatra. Although Thaksin, who was prime minister between 2001 and 2006, holds no formal position in his daughter's government, he has held considerable influence over Thai politics since his return from exile on 22 August. On 22 August 2024, he confirmed his and the Paetongtarn government's support for the scheme.

At the scheme's launch, Paetongtarn announced that the scheme would "create a tornado of spending".

== Implementation ==
The scheme is primarily being implemented through the Thang Rath app and is the primary platform for eligible people to register with. Registration is also available at participating 7-Elevens, Thailand Post offices, Boonterm and government service kiosks, and on the ThaID app. Registration through the Thang Rath app opened between 1 August 2024 and 15 September. When registration closed on 15 September, only 36 million people had registered, 9 million short of the planned 45 million. According to the Ministry of Finance, the exclusion of 9 million people saved around ฿100 billion. A second round of registration for people unable to register online was open between 16 September and 15 October. For businesses to participate in the scheme, a separate application process will open on 1 October. According to the Ministry of Commerce, 1.6 million businesses are eligible.

The scheme was originally meant to begin on 1 February 2024 but was delayed. In late March, the scheme was again delayed from May to the fourth quarter of 2024.

=== Phase 1 ===
Phase 1 of the scheme was launched on 25 September 2024 and was targeted towards vulnerable groups. Totally around 14.5 million people, this included 12.4 million welfare card holders and 2.1 million people with disabilities. Distribution of the scheme is staggered, with payments being distributed in phase 1 between September 25 and 30 depending on their welfare card numbers, while all recipients with disabilities received payment on September 25. This is to avoid overwhelming the banking system.

By 1 October, around 200,000 people had experienced unsuccessful transfers due to them not linking their accounts to PromptPay. For those with unsuccessful transfers, the Ministry of Finance coordinated with the Ministry of Social Development and Human Security to help them link accounts. More transfers have been announced for 22 October, 22 November and 22 December.

Phase 1 had a ฿145 billion budget.

== Impact ==
The Thai government has said that the scheme will boost Thailand's GDP by 1.2 to 1.8 percentage points and cause growth in 2025 to be at 5%. Others have given smaller estimates, with The Thaiger estimating it will boost Thailand's GDP by 0.33 to 0.6 percentage points in the short term.

According to InnovestX, a subsidiary of Siam Commercial Bank, companies who run convenience stores, supermarkets, and hypermarkets will be major beneficiaries of the scheme. This includes CP All and Berli Jucker. These companies, alongside financial lenders, have seen their stock prices increase as a result of the scheme. Although recipients are not allowed to spend the handout at department stores and hypermarkets, Pavida Pananond of Thammasat Business School said the line between hypermarkets and convenience stores is blurred.

Following the launch of phase 1, ATM withdrawals in Thailand have surged, especially at BAAC branches where withdrawals have increased by 18 times.

== Reception ==
The scheme has been repeatedly criticised by the Move Forward and Democrat parties when they were in the opposition.

Sethaput Suthiwartnarueput, governor of Thailand's central bank the Bank of Thailand, said in April 2024 that Thailand's post-COVID-19 recovery was gaining momentum and did not warrant a large stimulus such as the scheme.
