= Assets Examination Committee =

The Assets Examination Committee (Thai: คณะกรรมการตรวจสอบการกระทำที่ก่อให้เกิดความเสียหายแก่รัฐ; RTGS: Khana Kammakan Truat Sop Kan Kratham Thi Ko Hai Koet Khwam Sia Hai Kae Rat, Literal Meaning: the Committee for Inspection of Acts being Detrimental to the State), abbreviated as AEC (Thai: คตส., RTGS: khotoso), sometimes translated as the Assets Scrutiny Committee or ASC was a Thai administrative body in charge of scrutiny of assets of the ministers in the government of Pol Lt Col Thaksin Shinawatra. The Council for National Security, a military junta that overthrew Thaksin's government in 2006, accused those ministers of having gained assets in a manner against the law or detrimental to the state. They set up the AEC in response.

== Members ==
1. Nam Yimyaem (นาม ยิ้มแย้ม), chairperson
2. Instructor Kaewsan Atibhoti (แก้วสรรค์ อติโพธิ), member and secretary
3. Sak Kosaengrueang (สัก กอแสงเรือง), member and spokesman
4. Klanarong Chanthik (กล้านรงค์ จันทิก), member
5. Khunying Jaruvan Maintaka (จารุวรรณ เมณฑกา), member
6. Chiranit Hawanon (จิรนิติ หะวานนท์), member
7. Assoc Prof Banjerd Singkaneti (บรรเจิด สิงคะเนติ ), member
8. Prof Wirot Laohaphan (วิโรจน์ เลาหะพันธุ์ ), member
9. Sawat Chotiphanit (สวัสดิ์ โชติพานิช), member (later resigned)
10. Prof Saowani Atsawarot (เสาวนีย์ อัศวโรจน์), member
11. Udom Fueangfung (อุดม เฟื่องฟุ้ง), member
12. Amnuai Thanthara (อำนวย ธันธรา), member

== Powers and duties ==
The AEC's powers and duties were:

1. To inspect any performance or project as approved or consented by any person in the Council of Ministers or by the Council of Ministers vacating office by the result of the democratic reform if there is a ground to suspect that it was carried out corruptly or dishonestly
2. To inspect any contract, concession or procurement of any government agency, state enterprise or other state agencies if there are grounds to suspect that it rendered illegal benefit to any private individual or it constituted illegal act or corruption or dishonest behaviour
3. To inspect any performance of duties of any state official or state agency if there are grounds to suspect that there is a commission of illegal act or corruption or dishonest behavior
4. To inspect any act of any person if it is of opinion that such act is illegal or avoiding of duties under the law on taxation and revenue which may be detrimental to the state.

== See also ==
- Potjaman Shinawatra
- Politics of Thailand
- Council for Democratic Reform
- Council for National Security
- 2006 Thai coup d'état
