= Pitaka Suksawat =

Thai businessman (born 1982)

- ปิฎก สุขสวัสดิ์

Spouse of the Prime Minister of Thailand
- In role 16 August 2024 – 29 August 2025
- Prime Minister: Paetongtarn Shinawatra
- Preceded by: Pakpilai Thavisin; Apinaya Wechayachai (acting)
- Succeeded by: Surisa Jungrungreangkit (acting); Thananon Niramit

Personal details
- Born: 21 June 1982 (age 44) Khanom, Nakhon Si Thammarat, Thailand
- Party: Pheu Thai (since 2022)
- Spouse: Paetongtarn Shinawatra (m. 2019)
- Children: 2
- Relatives: Thaksin Shinawatra (father-in-law); Potjaman Na Pombejra (mother-in-law); Panthongtae Shinawatra (brother-in-law); Yingluck Shinawatra (aunt-in-law)
- Education: King Mongkut's Institute of Technology Ladkrabang (BEng)
- Nickname: Por (ปอ)

Pitaka Suksawat (Thai: ปิฎก สุขสวัสดิ์; RTGS: Pidok Suksawat; born 21 June 1982), nicknamed Por (Thai: ปอ), is a Thai businessman, politician, and former pilot. He is the Deputy Chief Investment Officer of Rende Development Co., Ltd. and a board member of the Thaicom Foundation. He is the spouse of Paethongtarn Shinawatra, former leader of the Pheu Thai Party and the 31st Prime Minister of Thailand.

== Biography ==
Pitaka Suksawat was born on 21 June 1982. He is originally from Khanom District, Nakhon Si Thammarat Province. He graduated with a Bachelor of Engineering degree in Mechanical Engineering from the Faculty of Engineering at King Mongkut's Institute of Technology Ladkrabang. After graduation, he worked as a pilot of Royal Thai Air Force for a period of time.

Pitaka was introduced to Paethongtarn Shinawatra through Kanapot Chomrit, a former executive of the Thai Raksa Chart Party, who is both his cousin and a classmate of Paethongtarn. The two were married in Thailand on 17 March 2019 at Rosewood Bangkok. They held a second wedding ceremony five days later at the Rosewood Hong Kong Hotel, presided over by Princess Ubolratana.

Pitaka and Paethongtarn have one daughter, Thitara Suksawat, who was born on 10 January 2021, and one son, Phrutthasin Suksawat, who was born on 1 May 2023, ahead of the general election the same month.

He is a key supporter of his wife in both her business and political endeavors.

In his 2024 asset declaration, Pitaka Suksawat disclosed a collection of luxury watches valued at 69 million baht (around $2 million USD) and two rings worth 300,000 baht (roughly $8,500 USD). His total net worth was estimated to exceed 147 million baht (approximately $4.3 million USD).

Honorary titles
Preceded by Pakpilai Thavisin	Spouse of the Prime Minister of Thailand; 2024–2025	Incumbent
