= Panthongtae Shinawatra =

Thai businessman (born 1979)

- พานทองแท้ ชินวัตร
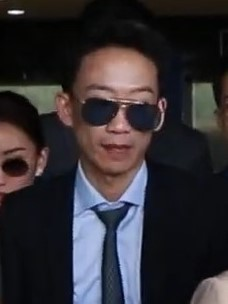
- Panthongtae Shinawatra
- Born: 2 December 1979 (age 46); Huntsville, Texas, U.S.
- Occupation: Founder of Voice TV
- Political party: Pheu Thai
- Spouses: Natthiya Puangkham
- Parents: Thaksin Shinawatra (father); Potjaman Shinawatra (mother)
- Relatives: Pintongta Shinawatra (sister); Paetongtarn Shinawatra (sister); Yingluck Shinawatra (aunt); Pitaka Suksawat (brother-in-law)

Panthongtae Shinawatra (Thai: พานทองแท้ ชินวัตร; RTGS: Phanthongthae Chinnawat; nicknamed Oak; born 2 December 1979) is a Thai businessman and the only son of former prime minister of Thailand, Thaksin Shinawatra. He is also the brother of Paetongtarn Shinawatra, former prime minister of Thailand from 2024 to 2025.

== Early life and education ==
Panthongtae was admitted to the Faculty of Engineering at Thammasat University in 1998. However, he dropped out after one year. In 2000, he enrolled in Ramkhamhaeng University, an open admission government university, where he studied political science. In August 2002, his studies attracted media attention when he was accused of cheating in an exam. A three-week university investigation concluded that Panthongtae had made a mistake by carrying unrelated notes into the exam room and he was cleared of wrongdoing, yet he automatically failed the political science subject he was sitting. He graduated with a bachelor's degree in 2003.

== Careers ==
An amateur photographer, Panthongtae founded in 2003 a production company called How Come Entertainment (now Voice TV Co. Ltd.), which was awarded an exclusive advertising contract for the MRT and many other government contracts when his father was prime minister. This caused controversy and drew charges of nepotism, as How Come was a new firm and the advertising concession for the subway had previously been awarded to the long established Triad Networks Company.

In early 2006, Panthongtae was involved in his family's sale of Shin Corporation stock to Temasek Holdings of Singapore. Thailand's Securities and Exchange Commission ruled that Panthongtae, as director of Ample Rich Investments (a shell company set up in the British Virgin Islands to control Shin stock), had failed to properly notify the regulators of his holdings in Shin and sale of Shin shares, in transactions that occurred in 2000, 2001 and 2002.

Prasong Vinaiphiat, deputy director of the Thailand Securities and Exchange Commission, said: "The case is not severe because Panthongtae did inform the SEC but his report was not totally correct." He was fined 5.982 million baht (about US$150,000) for three violations of the Securities and Exchange Act.

In November 2009, Panthongtae's company Voice TV (formerly How Come Entertainment) launched its own digital TV station of the same name with 300 million baht.
