= Potjaman Na Pombejra =

Ex-wife of Thaksin Shinawatra (born 1956)

Khun Ying Potjaman Damapong
- พจมาน ดามาพงศ์
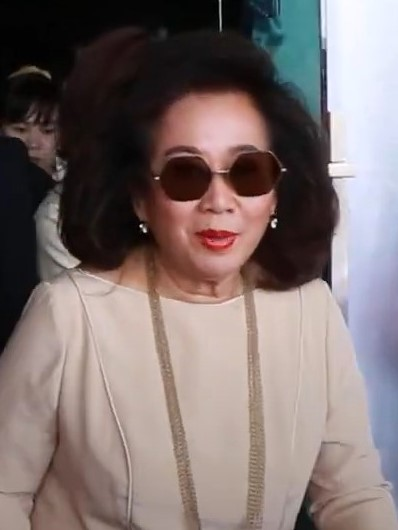
- Potjaman in 2019

Spouse of the Prime Minister of Thailand
- In role 9 February 2001 – 19 September 2006
- Prime Minister: Thaksin Shinawatra
- Preceded by: Phakdiphon Sucharitakul
- Succeeded by: Thanphuying Chitwadi Chulanont

Personal details
- Born: Soypetpotjaman Damapong; 22 November 1956 (age 69) Chaiyaphum, Thailand
- Party: Pheu Thai (2008–present)
- Other political affiliations: Palang Dharma (1988–1998); Thai Rak Thai (1998–2007); People's Power (2008)
- Spouse: Thaksin Shinawatra (m. 1976; div. 2008)
- Children: Panthongtae Shinawatra; Pintongta Shinawatra; Paethongtarn Shinawatra
- Relatives: Pitaka Suksawat (son-in-law)

Khun Ying Potjaman Damapong (Thai: พจมาน ดามาพงศ์; RTGS: Photchaman Damaphong), formerly Potjaman Shinawatra (Thai: พจมาน ชินวัตร; RTGS: Photchaman Chinnawat), née Soypetpotjaman Damapong (Thai: สร้อยเพชรพจมาน ดามาพงศ์; RTGS: Soiphetphotchaman Damaphong) (born 22 November 1956) is the ex-wife of former Thai Prime Minister Thaksin Shinawatra and mother of the former prime minister Paetongtarn Shinawatra.

== Early life and family ==
Potjaman was the youngest child and only daughter of Potjanee na Pombejra and her husband Samoe Damapong, a police general who excelled in his work on crime suppression and investigation and became a Deputy Commissioner-General of the Royal Thai Police. Samoe Damapong came from a family of Lao origin; his paternal grandfather was an Isan Lao from Nong Khai while his maternal grandmother was a princess of the Na Champassak family.

Potjaman and Thaksin married in July 1976, and they went on to have one son, Panthongtae, a businessman, and two daughters, Pinthongta and Paethongtarn. In the late 1970s and 1980s Potjaman worked with Thaksin to develop his various commercial ventures.

== Sale of Shin Corp ==
On 23 January 2006, the Shinawatra family sold their entire stake in Shin Corporation to Temasek Holdings. The Shinawatra and Damapong families netted about 73 billion baht tax-free from the sale, using a regulation that made individuals who sell shares on the stock exchange exempt from capital gains tax.

The Thailand Securities and Exchange Commission investigated the transaction and cleared the entire family from wrongdoing, except for Potjaman's son, Panthongtae.

The SEC did find that Panthongtae committed minor infractions with regard to information disclosure and public tender offers in transactions between 2000 and 2002. He was fined 6 million THB (about US$150,000).

Allegations of insider trading by Potjaman, other Shinawatra family members, Shin Corporation Corp executives, and major shareholders were also investigated. No irregularities were found. On 21 September 2006, the Revenue Department sent a letter to the Shinawatras advising the Shinawatra family not to pay taxes on the transaction. Also in 2006, Revenue Department Director-General Sirot Sawadpanish testified to the military junta's Assets Examination Committee that the transaction was not taxable. The junta investigated Sirot and 6 other senior Ministry of Finance officials for their role in dispensing legal advice regarding the transaction. The AEC demanded that Potjaman testify to the committee, and threatened to jail her if she did not.

== Ratchadaphisek land purchase controversy ==
After Thaksin was deposed by a military coup, the junta-appointed Assets Examination Committee accused her of irregularities in the purchase of government-owned land. However, the Bank of Thailand, which supervised the sale of the land, claimed that the sale was conducted properly.

In January 2007, the Financial Institutions Development Fund complied with the Assets Examination Committee request to file a charge against Thaksin and his wife over their purchase of four 772 million baht plots of land from the FIDF in 2003.

The charge was based on alleged violation of Section 100 of the National Counter Corruption Act, which specifies that government officials and their spouses are prohibited from entering into or having interests in contracts made with state agencies under their authorisation. However, Section 4 of the Act indicates that persons committing malfeasance must be direct supervisors of the damaged party - in this case, the FIDF.

At the time, Bank of Thailand Governor Pridiyathorn Devakula directly supervised the FIDF, not Thaksin. Section 29 of the Bank of Thailand Act of 1942 stated that the Prime Minister did not have jurisdiction to oversee the FIDF, because those managing the fund had sole authority for policies, control, oversight and regulations governing the agency.

Pridiyathorn's testimony to the court occurred in secret - Thaksin's legal team was not allowed in the room. The FIDF later noted that the land was sold to the Shinawatras at a price greater than its appraised value. The case went to the Supreme Court on 10 July 2007.

=== Verdict ===
On 21 October 2008, the Supreme Court of Thailand's Criminal Division for Holders of Political Positions delivered a verdict on the Ratchadaphisek Land purchasing case, ruling that: As Thaksin and wife [Potjaman] defended themselves that the FIDF was not an administrative agency or state enterprise, and Thaksin, as the Prime Minister, had no powers and duties to supervise, scrutinise or monitor the Fund, resulting that the land purchasing case was not a conflict of interest.

The Court: By unanimous resolution, holding that the Fund was the administrative agency under Section 100, Subsection (1), of the National Counter Corruption Organic Act, BE 2542 (1997). By 6:3, holding that Thaksin was a de facto supervisor of the Fund. By 7:2, holding that Potjaman was not a holder of political position or public authority prohibited under Section 122 of the Organic Act. And by unanimous resolution, holding that the purchased land and all other properties gained in this case could not be seized under Section 33, Subsection 1 and Subsection 2 of the Criminal Code.

Therefore, Thaksin was found guilty of abusing his power to help his wife purchasing the land at a knock-down price, being sentenced to two years in imprisonment. All accusations against Potjaman in the case shall lapse together with the arrest warrant whereof. However, as Thaksin was dwelling aboard, the arrest warrant was issued to bring him back to the domestic punishment.

Soon after the verdict was handed down, Thaksin gave a telephone interview to Reuters, stating he had expected the imprisonment term. He was quoted as remarking that "I have been informed of the result. I had long anticipated that it would turn out this way", and adding that the case was politically motivated.

== Judgment ==
Potjaman was found guilty on 31 July 2008, and sentenced to 3 years imprisonment. She was released on 5 million baht bail. Bangkok Criminal Court Judge Pramote Pipatpramote also convicted Potjaman's adopted brother, Bhanapot Damapong, and her secretary: "The three defendants have high economic and social status. But, they were working together to avoid taxes, even though the taxes amounted to little compared to their assets."

=== Request for asylum in Britain ===
On 10 August 2008, Thaksin and Potjaman flew to London from Beijing, where he had been attending the 2008 Summer Olympics Opening Ceremony. In doing so he violated the terms of his bail. Thaksin said that it was his wish to return to Thailand someday, but claimed it was not currently safe enough for him and his family. Thaksin announced his intention to seek political asylum in Britain. His three children had reportedly flown ahead to Britain. Meanwhile, Thailand's Supreme Court issued an arrest warrant for both Thaksin and his wife for jumping bail.

Thai Supreme Commander Gen. Boonsrang Niempradit and opposition leader Abhisit Vejjajiva accused Thaksin of hurting Thailand and damaging its reputation: "His Majesty the King recognizes highly the importance of the judiciary … The public should follow him."

=== Arrest warrants ===
On 17 September, Chief Justice Thonglor Chom-ngarm and the judges unanimously postponed the reading of the verdict to 21 October, and issued fresh arrest warrants for Thaksin and Potjaman.

== Cancellation of UK visa ==
On 10 November 2008, the Department of Foreign Affairs (Philippines) Undersecretary Franklin Ebdalin stated "the government would 'politely' turn down any request for political refuge from the fugitive Thai leader, due to Manila's 'friendly' relations with Bangkok. If an applicant for political asylum insists, the first thing the friendly country customarily does is to send him back to his home country. The Department of Foreign Affairs had not received 'feelers' that Thaksin wanted haven in the Philippines. Of course, he wouldn't want to be embarrassed, that's why I don't think he would make such a request. He's no ordinary figure. He's a former prime minister of Thailand." Amid Thai newspaper reports that Thaksin may land in Manila, his brother-in-law, Somchai Wongsawat, was set to arrive for a scheduled state visit on November 10 with Gloria Macapagal Arroyo about the 2008 financial crisis.

The British Government Home Office revoked Potjaman Shinawatra and Thaksin's visas, while the Bangkok British Embassy e-mailed airlines advisory directing them to disallow Thaksin or his wife from boarding flights to the United Kingdom. But Thaksin's spokesman, Phongthep Thepkanjana, said: "I spoke with Thaksin's secretary and he said that Thaksin still had not been notified by the British government." Thaksin was reported to be travelling in East Asia, having been forced to look for a home. Thaksin still remains honorary president of the Manchester City Football Club, which he sold in August. Thaksin had considered sanctuaries such as China, the Philippines and the Bahamas. The Times reported the Thaksins were granted Bahamas honorary citizenship and the couple are building a £5.5 million home in China. The visa revocation rendered moot the UK extradition issue, but Thai prosecutors complained "it would now be harder to keep track of him, and he could end up in a country with which Thailand does not have an extradition treaty." Somchai Wongsawat said: "The revoking of the visas is the decision by the Government of Great Britain. We cannot criticise."

Meanwhile, Thaksin's attorney, Udom Prongfa filed a counter-charge against Veera Somkwamkid with the Crime Suppression Division (CSD): "Mr Veera went ahead and filed the charge even after the Royal Thai Police Office had concluded Mr Thaksin had done nothing wrong." Also, thousands of Thaksin supporters at the stadium gathered and claimed that only "royal kindness or the power of the people" could bring him home.

=== Extradition ===
Sirisak Tiypan, director general for international affairs of the Office of the Attorney General, said: "No matter China or the Philippines, we have an extradition treaty with both countries." Thaksin may appeal the guilty verdict until November 22 but prosecutors are working on extradition documents. Sirisak added "that even if Thaksin decides to live in a country with which Thailand has no extradition treaty, authorities could ask for him to be handed over on a reciprocal basis." Bahamas, Bermuda and African countries without extradition treaties with Thailand have reportedly offered to take in Thaksin and his wife.

== Wealth Concealing ==
=== Transferring Shares to children who reached maturity ===
There has been controversy on whether there is any hidden interest when Thaksin and Potjaman transferred their Shin Corp. shares to their children. Panthongtae and Pinthongtharn Shinawatra were accused of being nominees of their parents. Potjaman transferred her shares to Parnthongtae was said to have been a setup. For Panthongtae's case, the shares have been sold to him at cost price. Prior the transfer, Panthongtae had written an agreement to settle a ฿4.5billion baht debt for buying 300 million shares of Thai Military Bank (TMB) to Potjaman. In which the real value of TMB share at that time was ฿1.5billion baht. This means that there has been a “fake debt” worth of ฿3billion baht.

The Assets Examination Committee (AEC) later revealed that Panthongtae's account that receives Shin Corp. dividend has been transferring money to Potjaman's account exceeds the debt to ฿1.1Billion baht.

Pintongtha was accused of being another nominee of her parents. In response to the accusation, she said that her mother gave her a certain amount of money to buy Shin Corp. shares from her brother, Panthongtae. Potjaman gave money to her daughter to buy 367 million shares of Shin Corp. which leaves Panthongtae an equal number of shares. Pintongtha's account has been receiving dividend from Shin Corp and there has not been any transaction between Pintongtha's account and Potjaman's account. However, the money was used to buy SC Asset shares from WinMark worth of ฿71 million baht and buy shares from another five real-estate firms from two funds in 2004 worth of ฿485 million baht.

DSI, AEC, and Securities and Exchange Commission later revealed common information that WinMark and the two funds are owned by Thaksin and Potjaman Shinawatra. Potjaman responded the accusation that she did not own Winmark, neither her husband. The company is however owned by a real-estate firm from the middle east.

== Honours ==
- Dame Grand Cordon (Special Class) of the Most Exalted Order of the White Elephant (2002)
- Dame Grand Cordon (Special Class) of the Most Noble Order of the Crown of Thailand (2001)
- Dame Grand Cross (First Class) of the Most Admirable Order of the Direkgunabhorn (1998)
- Companion (Third Class, lower grade) of the Most Illustrious Order of Chula Chom Klao (2003)

== See also ==
- Thaksin Shinawatra

== Bibliography ==
- Baker, Chris; Pasuk, Phongpaichit (2009). Thaksin: The Business of Politics in Thailand (second expanded ed.). Silkworm Books. ISBN 978-974-9575-55-0.
- Potjamarn Shinawatra: Commander behind the Curtain or Looser at the End of the Cliff? (in Thai). Bangkok: Ruam Duai Chaui Kan. 2005. ISBN 974-9785-94-0.

Honorary titles
Preceded by Phakdiphon Sucharitakul	Spouse of the Prime Minister of Thailand (23 May 2006 – 19 September 2006)	Succeeded by Chitwadi Chulanont
