= Order of the Direkgunabhorn =

Award

The Most Admirable Order of the Direkgunabhorn เครื่องราชอิสริยาภรณ์อันเป็นที่สรรเสริญยิ่งดิเรกคุณาภรณ์
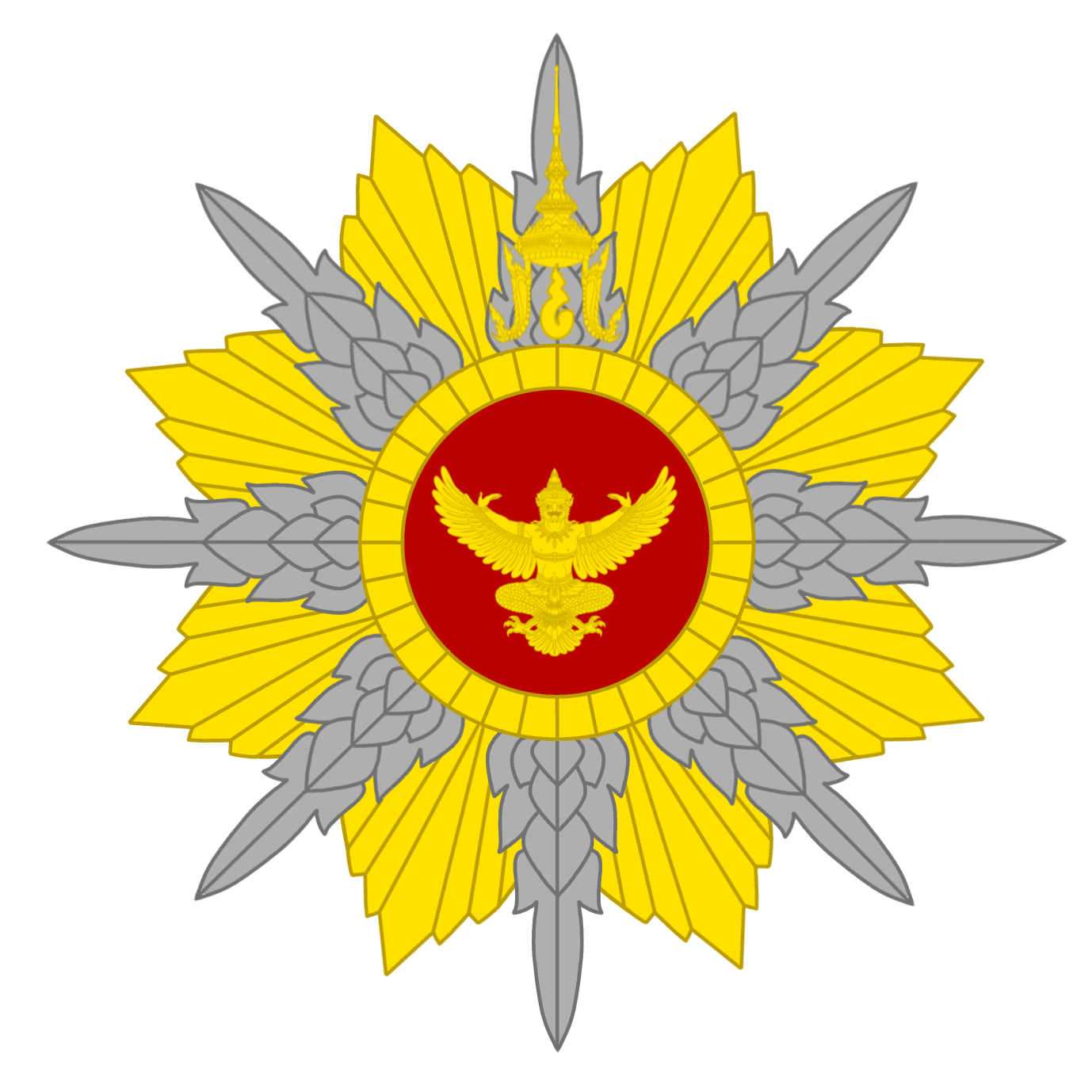
- Star of the Order of Direkgunabhorn

Awarded by the King of Thailand
- Established: 22 July 1991
- Eligibility: Military and Civilian Order
- Status: Currently constituted
- Founder: King Bhumibol Adulyadej
- Sovereign: King Vajiralongkorn
- Grades: 1st Class; 2nd Class; 3rd Class; 4th Class; 5th Class

Statistics
- First induction: 3 December 1995
- Last induction: 23 March 2023

Precedence
- Next (higher): Order of the Crown of Thailand
- Next (lower): Vallabhabhorn Order
- Ribbon bar of the Knight Grand Cross (First Class) of the Most Admirable Order of Direkgunabhorn.

The Most Admirable Order of the Direkgunabhorn (Thai: เครื่องราชอิสริยาภรณ์อันเป็นที่สรรเสริญยิ่งดิเรกคุณาภรณ์; RTGS: Khrueang Ratcha-itsariyaphon An Pen Thi Sansoen Ying Direkkhunaphon) was established by King Bhumibol Adulyadej (Rama IX) on 22 July 1991 (B.E. 2534) to be bestowed upon those who have rendered devotional services to the Kingdom of Thailand. The title Direk Gunabhorn (ดิเรกคุณาภรณ์, also spelled Tirek Gunabhorn) roughly translates as "Most Admirable Order of Virtuous Service".

== Classes ==
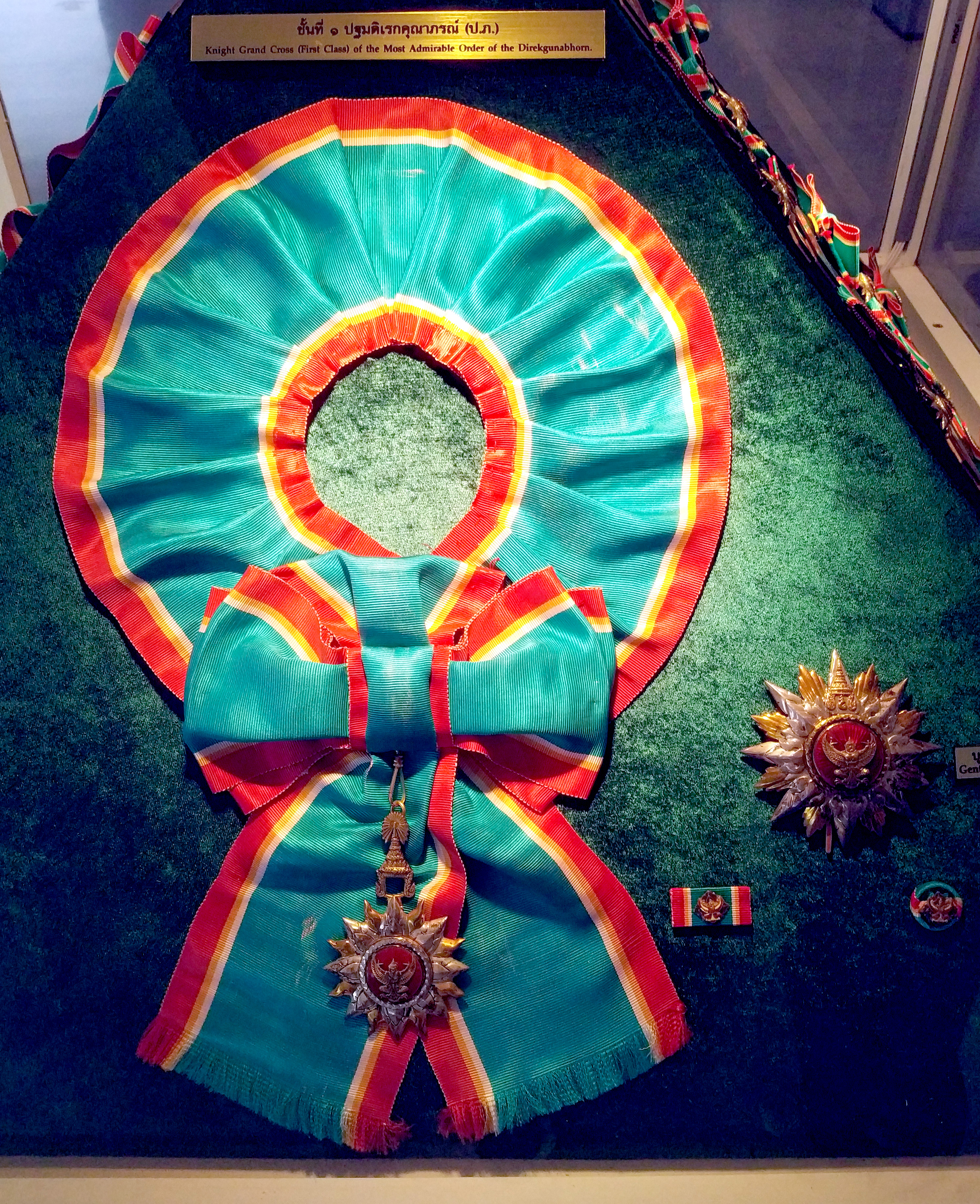
A set of the Knight Grand Cross of the Order of the Direkgunabhorn

The Order consists of seven classes. Originally, the ribbon for each class was the same, with no device to distinguish the different level. On 31 January 2538 B.E. (1995 CE), the regulations were amended to include a device on the ribbon distinguishing the class.

| Ribbon | Class | Name | Postnominals | Order of precedence | Insignia |
|---|---|---|---|---|---|
| | Knight Grand Cross (First Class) | ปฐมดิเรกคุณาภรณ์ (Pathom Tirekgunabhorn) | PBh (GCT) | 7 | Breast star and Green Sash with pendant. |
| | Knight Commander (Second Class) | ทุติยดิเรกคุณาภรณ์ (Dutiya Tirekgunabhorn) | DBh (KCT) | | Insignia consists of a pendant, worn on a silk band on the collar, along with a star of the knight. |
| | Commander (Third Class) | ตติยดิเรกคุณาภรณ์ (Tatiya Tirekgunabhorn) | TBh (CT) | | Insignia consists of a pendant, worn on a silk band on the collar. |
| | Companion (Fourth Class) | จตุตถดิเรกคุณาภรณ์ (Chatuttha Tirekgunabhorn) | ChBh (OT) | | Insignia consists of a pendant, worn on a silk band with a rosette, on the left chest. |
| | Member (Fifth Class) | เบญจมดิเรกคุณาภรณ์ (Benchama Tirekgunabhorn) | BBh (MT) | | Insignia consists of a pendant, worn on a silk band on the left chest. |
| | Gold Medalist (Sixth Class) | เหรียญทองดิเรกคุณาภรณ์ (Rian Thong Tirekgunabhorn) | RThBh (G.M.T) | | Insignia consists of a gold medal. |
| | Silver Medalist (Seventh Class) | เหรียญเงินดิเรกคุณาภรณ์ (Rian Ngoen Tirekgunabhorn) | RNgBh (S.M.T) | | Insignia consists of a silver medal. |

=== First class ===
- Knight Grand Cross of the Most Admirable Order of Tirekgunabhorn

Insignia: A pendant, star and sash (the insignia for women is the same as for men, but of a smaller size)

Pendant: The pendant consists of a circular disc enamelled red, superimposed by a representation of a Garuda in gold. The central piece is surrounded by a silver band with eight silver rays and eight gold rays. The whole piece is topped with a gold crown and a starburst. The reverse is of gold disc, with the Royal Cyphers of King Rama IX enamelled in white.
Sash: The pendant is suspended from a green sash 10 cm wide, with red, white and yellow trims, to wear over the right shoulder to the left hip.
Star: The star is similar to the pendant, with a gilded crown and insignia on the uppermost arm of the star. A gold band with eight silver rays and eight gold rays surrounds the central disc. The back of the star is similar to that of the pendant. The star is worn on the left chest.

=== Second class ===
- Knight Commander of the Most Admirable Order of Tirekgunabhorn

Insignia: A pendant, star and silk band (the insignia for women is the same as for men, but of a smaller size)

Pendant: The pendant consists of a circular disc enamelled red, superimposed by a representation of a Garuda in gold. The central disc is surrounded by a silver band with eight silver rays and eight gold rays. The reverse is a gold disc, with the Royal Cyphers of King Rama IX enamelled in white. The whole piece is topped with a gold crown and a starburst.
Silk band: The pendant is attached onto a green silk band 4 cm wide, with red, white and yellow trims, to wear as collar. For women, it is worn on the left chest.
Star: The star is similar to the pendant, with a gilded crown and insignia on the uppermost arm of the star. The gold band with eight silver rays and eight gold rays surrounds the central disc.

=== Third class ===
- Commander of the Most Admirable Order of Tirekgunabhorn

Insignia: A pendant only (the insignia for women is the same as for men, but of a smaller size)

Pendant: The pendant is similar to that for the Knight Commander, attached onto a silk band 4 cm wide, worn as a collar. For women, the pendant is worn on the front left shoulder.

=== Fourth class ===
- Companion of the Most Admirable Order of Tirekgunabhorn

Insignia: A pendant only.

Pendant: The pendant is similar to that for the Commander, but is a smaller size with an additional silk rosette. It is attached onto a small silk band, and worn on the left chest. For women the pendant is attached to a silk ribbon with an additional rosette, and worn on the front left shoulder.

=== Fifth class ===
- Member of the Most Admirable Order of Tirekgunabhorn

Insignia: A pendant only.

Pendant: The pendant is similar to that for the Companion, without the silk rosette.

=== Sixth class ===
- The Gold Medal of the Tirekgunabhorn

Insignia: A gold medal, with a Garuda in the centre, surrounded with eight lotus leaves and topped with a gold crown, starburst and insignia. The reverse is engraved with the Royal Cyphers of King Rama IX.

=== Seventh class ===
- The Silver Medal of the Tirekgunabhorn

Insignia: A silver medal, of the same design as the gold medal.

== Eligibility ==
Membership of the order can be gained via either "Devotional Service to the Kingdom", or by donation.

=== Service ===
Devotional service to the kingdom is deemed to be met via the following criteria:

- Five years of devotional service to the kingdom, from the last conferment.
- Outstanding service to the state, religion, and the people.
- Act of bravery for the state, religion, and the people.

The first decoration to be conferred is the silver medal or Companion, in case of extraordinary service.

A deemed person may request the Silver Medal of the Direkgunabhorn be issued. Decorations of higher class can be attained through further years of excellent service, until the Knight Grand Cross class is reached. Deemed persons include:

- Person of Other Nationalities

can attain Member and Companion

- Sportsmen (Olympics, World Games, Asian Games, Asian Championship)

can attain Silver Medal to Companion

- Private School Personnel

can attain Member and Companion

- Private University Personnel

can attain Silver Medal to Knight Commander

- Researchers, Scientists, National Artists

can attain Companion

=== Donation ===
Donations for public use of cash, property or goods can also earn membership of the order. The class obtained is relative to the amount donated, as per the following table:

| Donated amount | Class of Order |
| 100,000 baht | Silver Medal |
| 200,000 baht | Gold Medal |
| 500,000 baht | Member |
| 1,500,000 baht | Companion |
| 6,000,000 baht | Commander |
| 14,000,000 baht | Knight Commander |
| 30,000,000 baht | Knight Grand Cross |

== Selected recipients ==
- Anwar Chowdhry, sports official and president of International Boxing Association from 1986 to 2006
- Hernando de Soto Polar, economist
- Galyani Vadhana, Thai princess
- Ariya Jutanugarn, golfer
- Pornthip Rojanasunand, doctor
- Thaksin Shinawatra, politician
- Eiji Toyoda, industrialist
- Mink Nutcharut, snooker player
- 188 people involved in the Tham Luang cave rescue (114 foreigners and 74 Thais)
