= Paetongtarn Shinawatra =

Prime Minister of Thailand from 2024 to 2025

Paetongtarn Shinawatra RThBh
- แพทองธาร ชินวัตร
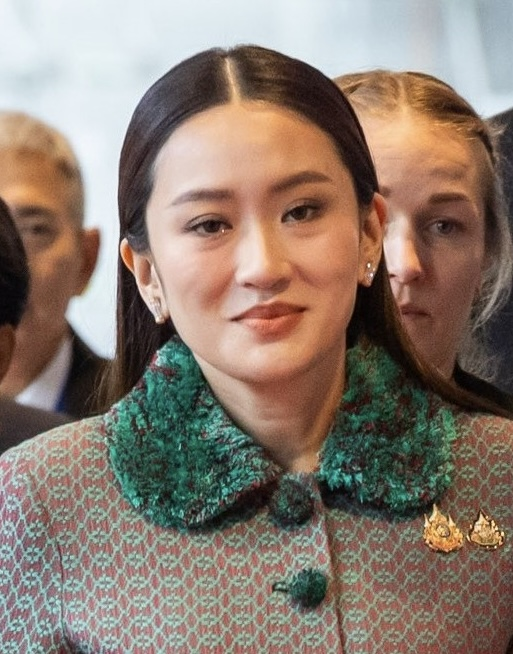
- Paetongtarn in 2025

31st Prime Minister of Thailand
- In office 16 August 2024 – 29 August 2025 (Note: Suspended from 1 July to 29 August 2025, when the Constitutional Court ruled to remove her from her position with retroactive effect.)
- Monarch: Vajiralongkorn
- Deputy: See list: Phumtham Wechayachai Suriya Juangroongruangkit Anutin Charnvirakul Pirapan Salirathavibhaga Pichai Chunhavajira Prasert Jantararuangtong
- Preceded by: Srettha Thavisin; Phumtham Wechayachai (acting)
- Succeeded by: Suriya Juangroongruangkit (acting); Anutin Charnvirakul

Minister of Culture
- In office 30 June 2025 – 29 August 2025
- Prime Minister: Herself; Suriya Juangroongruangkit (acting); Phumtham Wechayachai (acting)
- Preceded by: Sudawan Wangsuphakijkosol
- Succeeded by: Suchart Tancharoen (acting); Sabida Thaiseth

Leader of the Pheu Thai Party
- In office 27 October 2023 – 22 October 2025
- Preceded by: Cholnan Srikaew; Chusak Sirinil (acting)
- Succeeded by: Chusak Sirinil (acting); Julapun Amornvivat

Head of the Pheu Thai Family
- Incumbent
- Assumed office 31 October 2025
- In office 20 March 2022 – 27 October 2023

Personal details
- Born: 21 August 1986 (age 40) Bangkok, Thailand
- Party: Pheu Thai (since 2021)
- Spouse: Pitaka Suksawat (m. 2019)
- Children: 2
- Parents: Thaksin Shinawatra; Potjaman Damapong
- Relatives: Shinawatra family
- Education: Chulalongkorn University (BA); University of Surrey (MSc)
- Occupation: Businesswoman; politician
- Nickname: Ung Ing (อุ๊งอิ๊ง)

Paetongtarn Shinawatra (Note: Pronounced /pɛtɒnˈtɑːn ʃɪnəˈwɒt/ pet-on-TAHN shin-ə-WATT; Thai: แพทองธาร ชินวัตร, RTGS: Phaethongthan Chinnawat, pronounced [pʰɛ̄ː.tʰɔ̄ːŋ.tʰāːn tɕʰīn.na.wát].) (born 21 August 1986) is a Thai politician and businesswoman who served as the 31st prime minister of Thailand from 2024 until her removal from office in 2025. She led the Pheu Thai Party from 2023 until her resignation in 2025.

Paetongtarn was born into the prominent Shinawatra family as the youngest child of the 23rd prime minister Thaksin Shinawatra and niece of the 28th prime minister Yingluck Shinawatra. After graduating from Chulalongkorn University and the University of Surrey, she began a career in business before entering politics. In 2024, Paetongtarn became the youngest prime minister of Thailand, the first to be the child of a previous prime minister, and the second woman to hold the position, following her aunt. She also served as Minister of Culture in 2025.

On 1 July 2025, Paetongtarn was suspended from office by the Constitutional Court over a leaked phone call between her and former Cambodian leader Hun Sen, in which critics say she appeared deferential to him, in the wake of the border conflict between Thailand and Cambodia. The deputy prime minister, Suriya Juangroongruangkit, took over as Thailand's acting leader. On 29 August 2025, the Constitutional Court ruled 6–3 against Paetongtarn, officially removing her from office.

== Early life and education ==
Paetongtarn was born on 21 August 1986 in Bangkok. She completed her junior secondary education at St. Joseph's Convent School and her upper secondary education at Mater Dei School. Paetongtarn studied at the Faculty of Political Science, Chulalongkorn University where she obtained a BA degree in political science in 2008, with a focus on sociology and anthropology. She then continued her studies in England, where she obtained an MSc degree in international hotel management from the University of Surrey, graduating in 2009.

== Business career ==
Paetongtarn is the largest shareholder of SC Asset Corporation and a director of the Thaicom Foundation, a benefactor of her family's wealth. As of 2022, she holds a total of 21 companies valued at approximately ฿68 billion (US$2 billion).

== Early political career ==
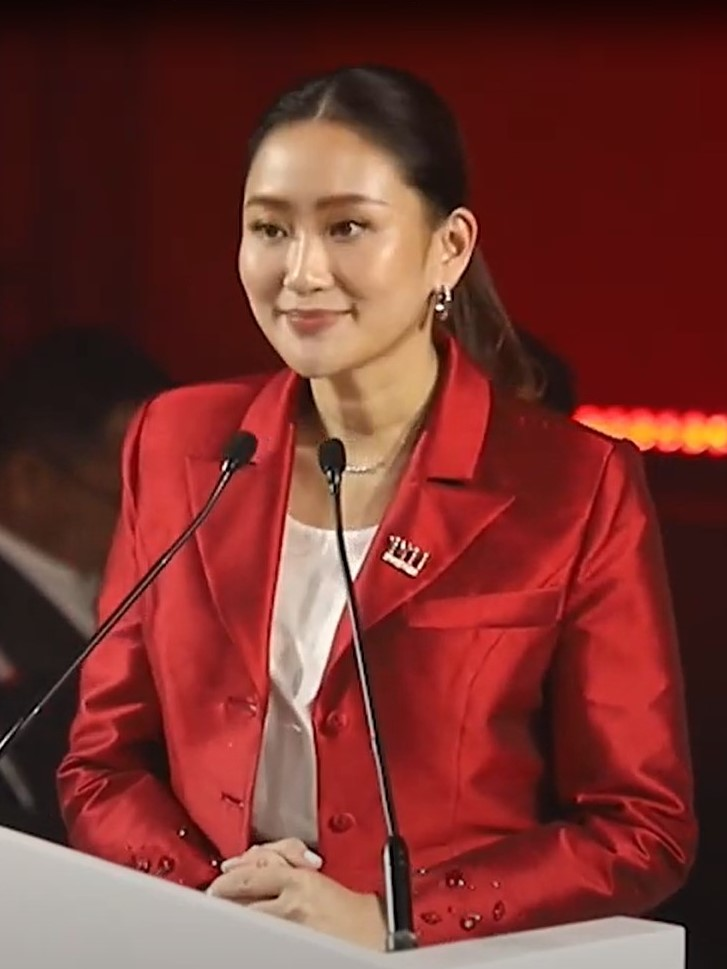
Paetongtarn during a speech after being elected leader of the Pheu Thai Party in 2023

At a meeting of the Pheu Thai Party on 20 March 2022, Paetongtarn was elected as "Head of the Pheu Thai Family". When speaking at the Pheu Thai Party's annual general meeting in April 2022, she said that she wanted to see regime change in Thailand and wanted to gain more experience before standing for the post of the country's prime minister.

Paetongtarn became the leading prime minister-candidate in the opinion polls. In April 2023, she was officially nominated as one of the three prime minister-candidates of Pheu Thai Party for the general election, along with Srettha Thavisin and Chaikasem Nitisiri.

After the general election in May 2023, the Pheu Thai Party secured the second-highest number of seats in the House of Representatives, following the Move Forward Party. She expressed disappointment that the party did not achieve first place as planned but stated that she was ready to work with the Move Forward Party and other parties willing to form a coalition with both parties. However, after Pheu Thai Party withdrew from the memorandum of understanding to form a government with the Move Forward Party, on 9 August, she and Pheu Thai Party executives walked from the OAI Tower, where the party's headquarters are located, to the neighbouring Thai Summit Tower to discuss with the Move Forward Party leaders about endorsing a candidate for the third round of prime ministerial voting. The following day, it was reported that Paetongtarn informed the Move Forward Party leaders that Pheu Thai Party needed to bring the Palang Pracharath Party, led by General Prawit Wongsuwan, into the coalition government. This led to the Move Forward Party deciding, six days later, not to support Pheu Thai's prime ministerial candidate. Following weeks of debate, Srettha was elected prime minister by the parliament of Thailand.

On 13 September 2023, during the first meeting of the 63rd Thai Cabinet, Prime Minister Srettha Thavisin ordered the establishment of the National Soft Power Strategy Committee and appointed Paetongtarn as the Deputy Chairperson. Later, on 3 October, Srettha appointed her to two additional positions: Chairperson of the National Soft Power Development Committee and a member of the Committee for the Organization of Celebrations for King Vajiralongkorn's 72nd Birthday Anniversary on 28 July 2024. Subsequently, on 7 October, Srettha appointed her as the Deputy Chairperson of the National Health System Development Committee.

On 27 October 2023, Paetongtarn was elected by the PTP's core members during a general assembly held at the party's head office to become the party's new leader, receiving 289 votes with one abstention.

== Prime Minister of Thailand (2024–2025) ==
Following the removal of Srettha as prime minister by the Constitutional Court of Thailand on 14 August 2024, Paetongtarn was nominated by Pheu Thai to succeed him. Her nomination was approved by the House of Representatives on 16 August after no alternatives were named by the other parties in the ruling coalition, making her the youngest person and the second woman to become Prime Minister of Thailand. She was officially sworn in on 18 August following an endorsement from King Vajiralongkorn, followed by her cabinet on 6 September.

Her premiership has been plagued by the return of her father Thaksin Shinawatra, a prominent and highly controversial political figure of Thailand. This led to a vote of no-confidence by the opposition, alleging that she has allowed her father to control the Thai government and does not have her own autonomy to run the country – Paetongtarn survived this and remained in position.

=== Administration ===
On 12 September 2024, Paetongtarn Shinawatra and the Cabinet presented their policy statement to Parliament, outlining ten priority policies for immediate implementation. These included comprehensive debt restructuring, measures to support Thai entrepreneurs, reductions in energy and utility costs, and efforts to integrate the informal and underground economies into the tax system. Additional priorities included economic stimulus through digital wallets, modernization of the agricultural sector, tourism promotion, anti-narcotics initiatives, crime prevention, and enhancements to social welfare, particularly for vulnerable groups, stateless individuals, and ethnic minorities. Following the policy announcement, on 13 September 2024, Paetongtarn and relevant Cabinet members visited Mae Sai district, Chiang Rai, to assess the flood situation in northern Thailand.

=== Domestic policy ===
==== Economy ====
===== Digital wallet scheme =====
Paetongtarn has overseen the implementation of the 10,000-baht digital wallet scheme, the flagship economic policy of the Pheu Thai Party. The scheme was originally promised during the 2023 election campaign as a one-time universal handout to nearly all Thais aged 16 and over, intended to deliver a large-scale stimulus to the domestic economy. However, since the Paetongtarn government took office, the program has faced significant modifications, delays, and criticism regarding its funding, implementation, and economic necessity.

The initial plan to fund the 500 billion baht scheme through a special loan bill was scrapped due to legal concerns and fears of violating fiscal discipline laws. Instead, the government has relied on the national budget. The universal nature of the handout was also curtailed, with eligibility restrictions introduced to exclude high-income earners (those with an annual income over 840,000 baht) and individuals with more than 500,000 baht in savings.

Phase 1, launched in September 2024, provided 10,000 baht in cash to approximately 14.5 million recipients, including state welfare cardholders and individuals with disabilities. Phase 2, implemented between January and April 2025, extended the cash transfers to an estimated 3 million senior citizens aged 60 and over. The first truly "digital" phase, which was set to target around 2.7 million young people aged 16–20 via a government application, has been indefinitely postponed. In May 2025, the government announced this decision, citing a worsening global economic outlook and the need to reallocate the remaining 157-billion-baht budget to more urgent stimulus measures, such as infrastructure development and tourism promotion. Paetongtarn has publicly insisted that the postponement is not a cancellation and that the government remains committed to fulfilling its promise once economic conditions improve. The policy has been a focal point of her premiership, drawing both support for its potential to aid households and strong criticism from economists for its high cost and debated effectiveness as a stimulus tool.

===== Tourism development =====
Paetongtarn Shinawatra has designated tourism as the primary engine for Thailand's economic growth, taking a hands-on role in policy-making and international promotion. Her administration's strategy focuses on elevating Thailand's global image, enhancing tourist safety, and boosting revenue by attracting high-value visitors and establishing the nation as a year-round destination.

A key initiative under her leadership is the "Amazing Thailand Grand Tourism and Sports Year 2025", a year-long campaign of festivals and major sporting events designed to attract visitors. This campaign is part of the broader "Ignite Thailand" vision, which aims to establish the country as a global hub for tourism and other key industries. In early 2025, she personally promoted this vision at international travel forums, such as ITB Berlin, setting an ambitious target of attracting 39 million tourists and generating 3.5 trillion baht in revenue for the year. As of early June 2025, Thailand had welcomed over 15 million international visitors for the year, showing a strong recovery. However, some economic research centers have noted that the ambitious full-year targets may face challenges due to a global economic slowdown and increasing regional competition.

===== Southern Land Bridge project =====
Paetongtarn Shinawatra has adopted the 1-trillion-baht Southern Land Bridge project as a cornerstone of her administration's economic policy, positioning herself as its chief advocate and lead promoter on the international stage. Her role is multifaceted, encompassing policy direction, investment promotion, and stakeholder management for one of Thailand's most ambitious and controversial mega-projects. The project aims to construct a 90-kilometer logistics corridor, including deep-sea ports in Ranong (Andaman Sea) and Chumphon (Gulf of Thailand), linked by a motorway and dual-track railway. This would create a strategic alternative to the congested Strait of Malacca for maritime transport. She has argued that it will reduce shipping times by several days, lower costs by up to 15%, create an estimated 280,000 jobs, and boost GDP growth.

During numerous overseas roadshows and at major domestic events like the "Ignite Thailand" forum in March 2025, she has presented the project as a key opportunity for investment. She has actively courted interest from global players, particularly during her official visit to China in February 2025, and has highlighted investment interest from firms in China, the Middle East (notably Dubai Port World), and financial institutions like the Asian Infrastructure Investment Bank (AIIB).

===== Casino legalization project =====
Under her leadership, the Thai government has advanced plans to legalize casinos as part of a broader initiative to develop large-scale "entertainment complexes". The policy is intended to attract foreign investment, stimulate tourism, create employment opportunities, and formalize Thailand's widespread underground gambling industry to increase government revenue. Paetongtarn has emerged as a prominent proponent of the initiative, presenting it as a strategy to develop "man-made" tourist destinations and enhance the country's global competitiveness. She has publicly argued that the project will stimulate the economy without using taxpayer funds, as the massive investment required (estimated at THB 100 billion per complex) will come from the private sector. The government projects that the complexes could boost GDP, increase tourist arrivals, and generate between 12 and 40 billion baht in annual tax revenue.

In January 2025, the Thai cabinet approved the Entertainment Complex Bill in principle, providing a legal framework for the proposed developments. The bill outlines the creation of multiple integrated resort projects, incorporating five-star hotels, shopping centres, concert venues, theme parks, and other entertainment facilities. The legislation stipulates that casino operations must be limited to no more than 10 per cent of the total floor area of each complex.

The policy has faced opposition from civic and religious groups, who warn of potential negative social consequences such as increased crime and gambling addiction. There is also a citizen-led effort to force a national referendum on the issue. Despite this, the Paetongtarn government continues to push the project forward as a key component of its long-term economic strategy.

Following her June 2025 suspension as prime minister, the future of the legislation was in doubt. Deliberation of the bill was planned to be held on 9 July 2025. However, on 7 July, the bill was withdrawn.

==== Cannabis ====
Cannabis had been decriminalised by the Prayut government in 2022, with the move being most supported by the Bhumjaithai Party (BJT) as one of its flagship policies. The Pheu Thai party had run in 2023 on an anti-drug policy and opposed the use of cannabis except for medical use and, under Srettha, had proposed legislation aimed at restricting the use of cannabis. The party's stance on cannabis thus led to tension with the BJT – creating a rift between the two parties which remained in a coalition when Paetongtarn became prime minister.

The Thai government had hoped that decriminalising cannabis would turn it into a cash crop. A lack of laws governing cannabis were blamed for the rise in illegal distribution and the creation of a saturated market. Shortly after becoming prime minister, the Ministry of Public Health proposed a new bill on 12 September 2024 restricting cannabis to medical and research reasons. It also proposed the establishment of a Cannabis Control Board (CCB) to regulate the industry. The bill did not pass and Paetongtarn pledged that the government would not reverse its policy on cannabis again. However, by 2025, tourists smuggling cannabis out from Thailand was on the rise. Somsak Thepsuthin, the Minister of Public Health, listed in May that Hong Kong, India, Pakistan and the United Kingdom were the main destinations. On 22 May, the Paetongtarn government announced it planned to introduce new restrictions limiting cannabis usage to individuals (including foreigners) with medical prescriptions from doctors. Paetongtarn's efforts to restrict cannabis use have contributed to increased tensions with the BJT party.

=== Foreign policy ===
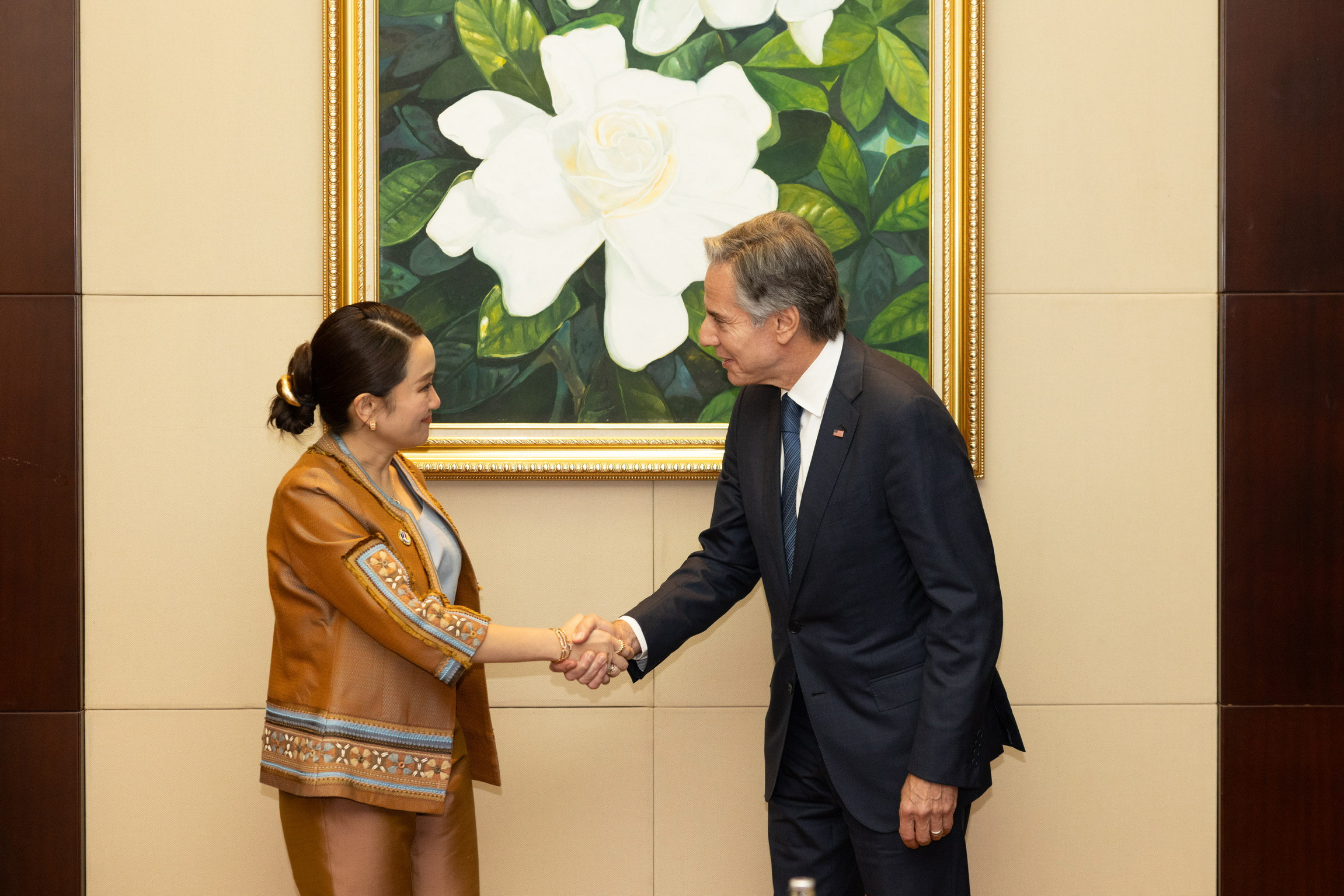
Paetongtarn with US Secretary of State Antony J. Blinken in 2024

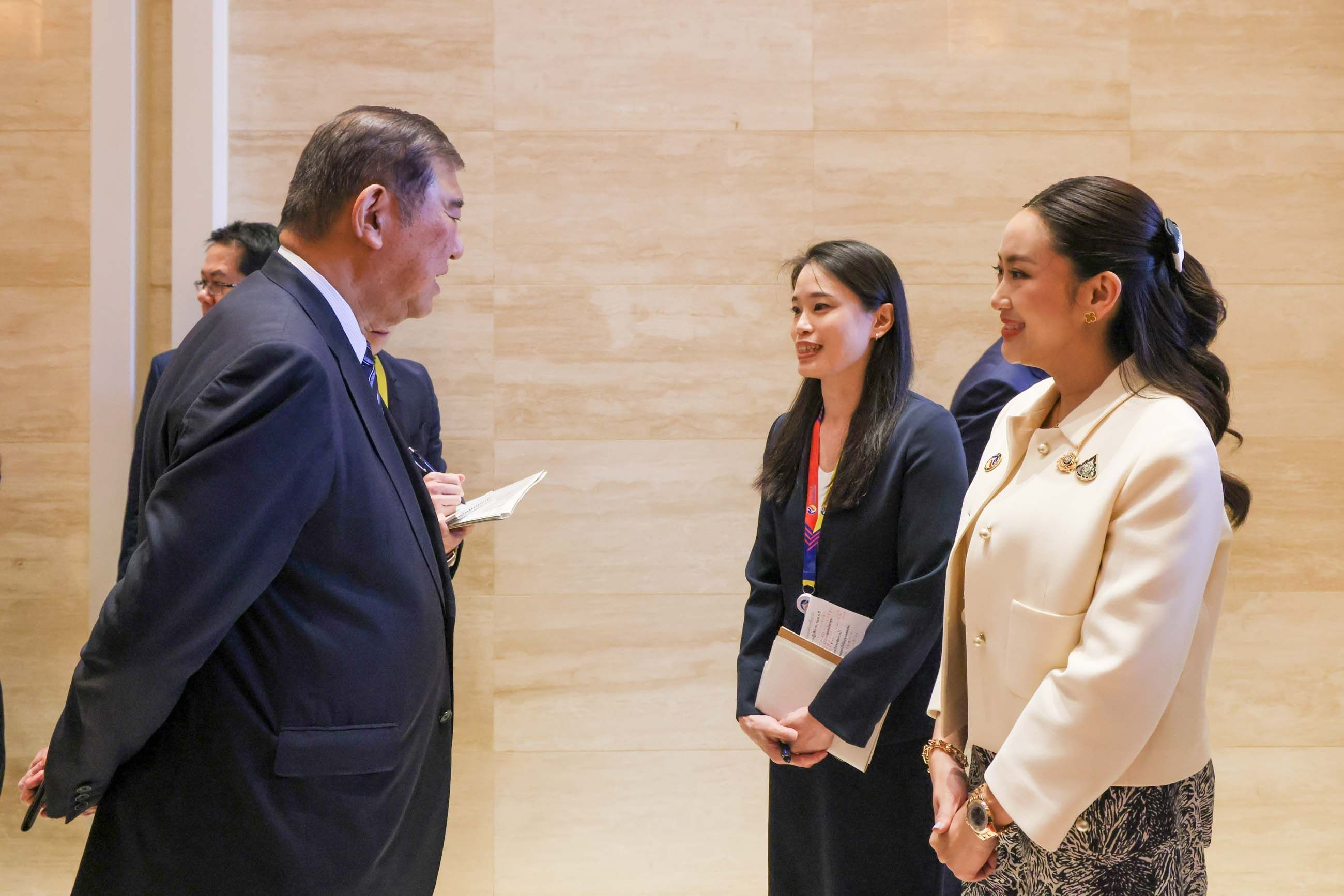
Paetongtarn informal talks with Shigeru Ishiba, Prime Minister of Japan in 2024

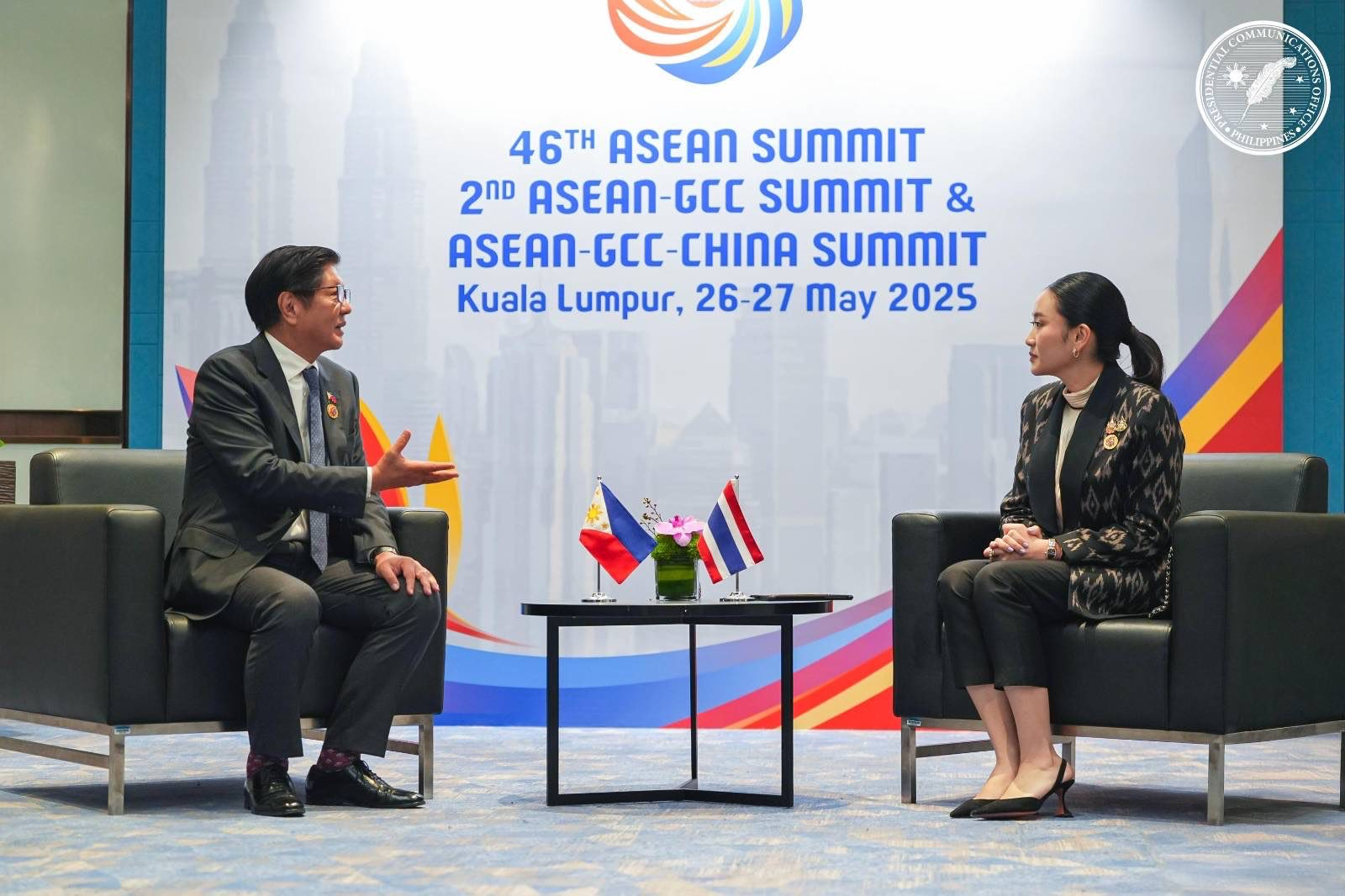
Paetongtarn with Philippine President Bongbong Marcos at 46th ASEAN Summit in Kuala Lumpur in 2025

In February 2025, Paethongtarn ordered the suspension of electricity, internet, and fuel supplies to five border areas in Myanmar as part of a multinational effort to dismantle transnational scams and human trafficking networks operating in the region. The decision was made in response to public demand for action against online scams and was agreed upon by Thailand's National Security Council and other government agencies. The affected scam operations involve false romantic schemes, fraudulent investment pitches, and illegal gambling. Revenue from electricity sales to these areas was estimated at 600 million baht ($17.8 million) annually.

During her first official trip to China from 5–8 February 2025, Paetongtarn emphasized strengthening Thailand-China ties in sectors like electric vehicles, semiconductors, and data centers. She met General Secretary of the Chinese Communist Party Xi Jinping to discuss various issues and attend the 2025 Asian Winter Games in Harbin. Chinese leader Xi Jinping thanked Paetongtarn Shinawatra for Thailand's strong measures against scam networks targeting Chinese nationals. He specifically praised her government's recent decision to cut off electricity to three major crime hubs just across the Thai-Myanmar border.

=== Cambodia border clash ===
After the Chong Bok border clash that led to a Cambodian soldier's death on 28 May 2025, Paetongtarn immediately directed the Ministry of Foreign Affairs to de-escalate tensions through official channels, while firmly affirming Thailand's territorial claims. She assured the public that her government had maintained continuous consultation with the armed forces following the border incident. She emphasized Thailand's commitment to peace while affirming the country's readiness to defend its citizens. In a public statement, she said, "Thailand is a peaceful nation, but we are fully prepared to protect our people. While we prioritise peaceful solutions, our military is ready should clashes occur."

She gave a speech in parliament declaring: "We will not give away even one square inch of land, but we will not go to war over misunderstandings either."

She also visited the tense border area to offer support but publicly insisted on a peaceful resolution, a position that stood in contrast to the tougher rhetoric from some military figures. Behind the scenes, Paetongtarn engaged in personal, informal diplomacy, leveraging the long-standing relationship between her family and former Cambodian Prime Minister Hun Sen. Her goal was to use this personal connection to defuse the situation. This led to a private phone call between the two leaders on 15 June 2025.

==== Phone call leak ====
On 18 June 2025, a 9-minute excerpt of the call between Paetongtarn Shinawatra and Hun Sen was leaked. Hun Sen responded by admitting that he had recorded the 15 June call and distributed the recording to around 80 Cambodian officials. Later on 18 June, Hun Sen published on Facebook the entire 17-minute call "to avoid any misunderstanding or misrepresentation". Paetongtarn acknowledged on the same day that it was her speaking in the leaked call.

The call recording showed Paetongtarn addressing Hun Sen as "uncle" and referring to herself as his "niece". Urging him to ignore "our opponents", Paetongtarn cited "the commander of the Second Army Region", Thai general Boonsin Padklang, as "a man of the opponents", who "wanted to look smart", and "said what was not beneficial to the nation" (Boonsin had declared that Thailand was "ready to fight"); instead Paetongtarn asserted: "we want the peace that happened before the clash at the border". Paetongtarn commented that she did not publicly react to Hun Sen's hostile Facebook posts regarding the border because she "loves and respects" Hun Sen. Paetongtarn further said that if Hun Sen "wants anything, he can just tell me, and I will take care of it".

Her comments were widely perceived by the Thai public and political opponents as weak, inexperienced, and compromising to national dignity and the morale of the armed forces. Paetongtarn also expressed frustration over domestic political pressure and criticism concerning her handling of the border crisis. Subsequently, several ministers from the Bhumjaithai Party, the second-largest party in the ruling coalition, resigned, leading to the party's withdrawal from the coalition government, citing harm to national dignity. The episode sparked protests and calls for her resignation.

Following the leak, Paetongtarn responded swiftly but was unable to fully contain the political fallout. At a press conference on 18 June 2025, she confirmed the authenticity of the recording before defending her remarks as part of an "off-the-record approach in a private conversation" and a "negotiation strategy" intended to defuse tensions with Hun Sen, who was reportedly angered by comments from a senior Thai military officer. Paetongtarn accused Hun Sen of breaching diplomatic trust and implied that the leak had been orchestrated to bolster his domestic popularity. She announced that she would refrain from future private discussions due to "trust issues".

Paetongtarn denied any rift with the Thai military, stating that her remarks had been misinterpreted and that she had contacted the commander in question to clarify the context. In response, the Bhumjaithai Party issued a statement condemning her conduct as damaging to the country's reputation, alleging it had caused "the country, people, and army to lose dignity". The party's withdrawal from the governing coalition left the Pheu Thai–led government with a slim parliamentary majority, placing its stability in jeopardy.

==== Suspension and removal by Thailand's Constitutional Court ====
On 1 July 2025, Thailand's Constitutional Court ruled in a 7–2 vote to suspend Paetongtarn from her official duties. The decision followed a petition from 36 senators who accused her of dishonesty and ethical standards breaches during the phone call. The Senate petition, submitted on 20 June by Senate President Mongkol Surasajja, alleged Paetongtarn violated Sections 160 and 170 of the Thai Constitution by abusing her position and undermining national interest. The Constitutional Court subsequently accepted the case, giving her 15 days to submit a defence. Suriya Jungrungreangkit took over as the acting prime minister from 1 July 2025 to 3 July 2025. Afterwards the position was taken over by Phumtham Wechayachai. Phumtham included Paetongtarn in his interim cabinet as the culture minister.

On August 29, 2025, the verdict led to Paetongtarn’s removal from office.

=== Controversies ===
In January 2025, Paetongtarn revealed that she had nearly been victimized by a scam using a message in a voice sounding identical to another world leader whom she did not disclose in which the caller was asking for donations.

On 24 March 2025, a no-confidence motion was filed against Paetongtarn by Leader of the Opposition Natthaphong Ruengpanyawut, who accused her of failing to address multiple issues and serving her family and Thaksin Shinawatra's interests. The motion failed to pass at a vote on 26 March, with Paetongtarn winning 319 votes.

== Political positions ==
=== Social issues ===
Paetongtarn is socially liberal on many issues. She supports LGBT rights and attended the Bangkok Pride Parade in 2023 along with the MFP's Pita Limjaroenrat. Additionally, she supports rewriting the constitution and scrapping military conscription. However, she opposes amending Thailand's lèse-majesté laws. Like her party, Paetongtarn supports stricter drug control and tough-on-crime measures.

Although Paetongtarn and the PTP pledged not to form a government with military-linked parties such as United Thai Nation and Palang Pracharath, the PTP-led government consisted of both parties which led to widespread criticism.

=== Economics ===
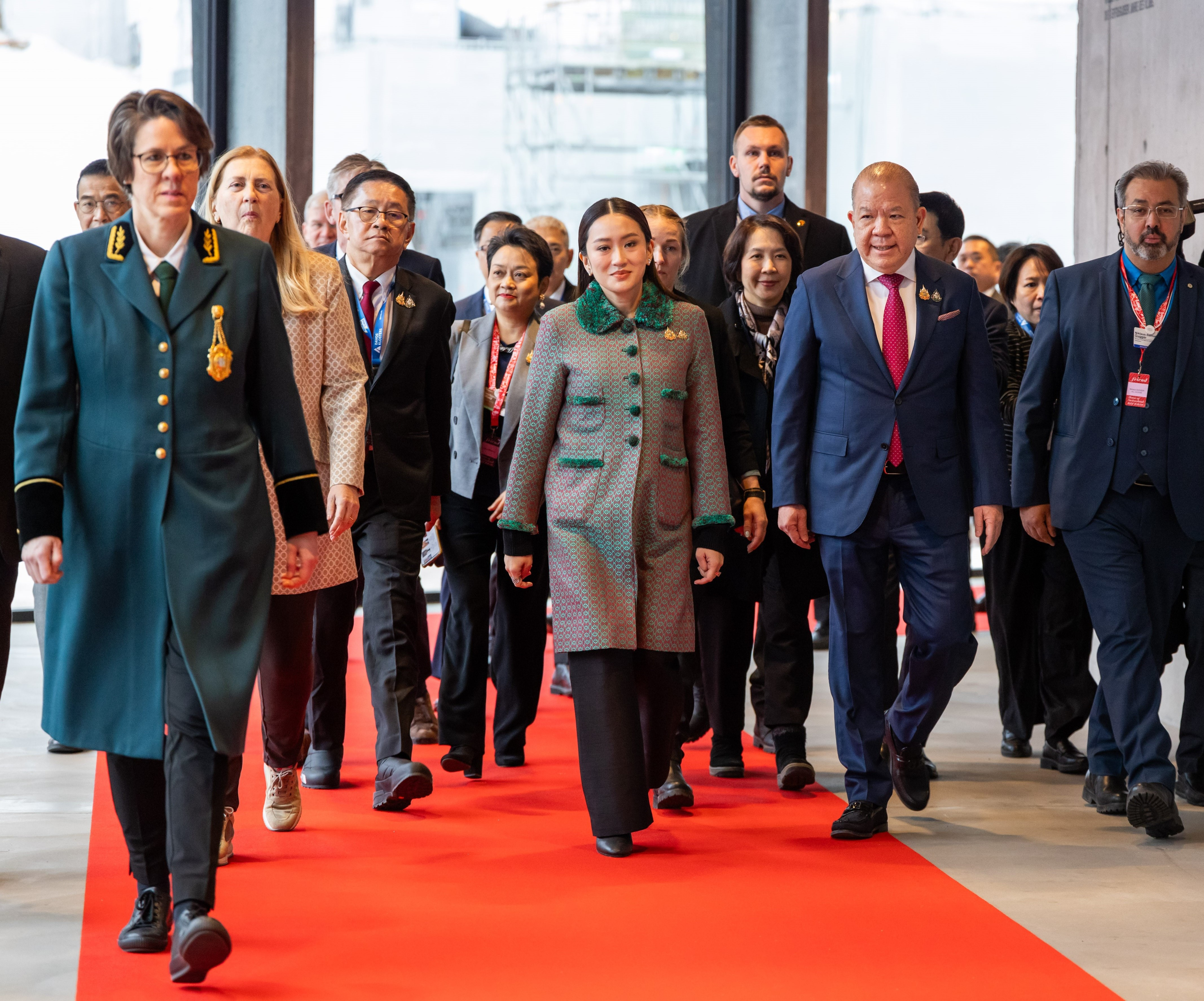
World Economic Forum 2025 in Davos: Prime Minister Paetongtarn Shinawatra at the House of Switzerland

In a 2023 interview, Paetongtarn called herself a "socially liberal capitalist". Paetongtarn stated that her party and Srettha Thavisin wants to focus on bread-and-butter issues and improving the economy. She supports "capitalism with empathy" along with gradually raising the minimum wage and implementing a ฿10,000 digital wallet scheme.

In May 2024, Paetongtarn told party members at an event held at Pheu Thai headquarters "The law that keeps the Bank of Thailand (BoT) independent from the government...is a problem and a significant obstacle in fixing economic problems", referencing the decade-high interest-rate of 2.50% which Srettha Thavisin believes was hurting small businesses and hurting government efforts to jumpstart an economy he says is in crisis. Paetongtarn said BoT monetary policy "refuses to understand and cooperate" and would hamper efforts to reduce high levels of debt.

== Controversies ==
=== Alpine Golf Course shareholders ===
Alpine Golf Course, located in Khlong Luang District, Pathum Thani Province, was originally owned by Nueam Chamnarnchatsakda, who donated the land to Wat Thammikaram Worawihan in 1969. In 1990, the land—designated as Sangha property (monastic land)—was sold and transferred to Alpine Real Estate Co., Ltd. and Alpine Golf and Sports Club Co., Ltd. The shareholders of these companies included Uraiwan Thienthong, wife of Sanoh Thienthong (Deputy Minister of the Interior at the time), and Chuchip Hansawat (Deputy Minister of Commerce).

In 1997, the land was sold to Potjaman Shinawatra, wife of then-Prime Minister Thaksin Shinawatra, and Yongyuth Wichaidit, Deputy Permanent Secretary of the Ministry of Interior. A subsequent order revoked the Land Department's cancellation of the title deed for the land due to its Sangha property status. Later, in 2012, Thailand's National Anti-Corruption Commission (NACC) ruled that Yongyuth had acted dishonestly in the case. In 2019, both the Court of First Instance and the Court of Appeal sentenced Yongyuth to two years in prison for corrupt conduct. Currently, the two companies are owned by Potjaman and her three children, including Paetongtarn Shinawatra.

=== University entrance examination ===
In March 2004, Paetongtarn Shinawatra passed Thailand's national university entrance exam and enrolled at Chulalongkorn University, one of the top universities in Thailand. However, questions arose over her admission, as her cumulative high school GPA was reportedly below 2.75 and her second-round entrance exam scores were significantly higher than her first-round results. Three months later, Adisai Bodharamik, then-Minister of Education, issued a statement claiming no conclusive evidence of exam leaks. However, he ordered disciplinary action and reprimands against Professor Police Colonel Dr. Woradej Chandrasorn, Secretary-General of the Office of the Higher Education Commission, and Sasithorn Ahingsako, Director of the Central Testing Bureau, for their roles in opening exam envelopes prematurely.

Following the Ministry of Education's review of the investigation, Woradej resigned from his position. In August 2005, he was later appointed as an Assistant Minister of Education.

== Personal life ==
Paetongtarn's nickname is Ung Ing (Thai: อุ๊งอิ๊ง), which is sometimes shortened to Ing. She is married to Pitaka Suksawat, a Thai businessman who is the Deputy Chief Investment Officer of Rende Development Co., Ltd., and a board member of the Thaicom Foundation.

Pitak and Paetongtarn have one daughter who was born on 10 January 2021, and one son, who was born on 1 May 2023.

In her asset declaration for 2024, she revealed a collection of 217 luxury handbags and 75 luxury watches, with a total net worth of over US$400 million.

== Honours ==
Paetongtarn has received the following royal decorations in the Honours System of Thailand:

- 2005: Gold Medal (Sixth Class) of the Most Admirable Order Direkgunabhorn

== Notes ==
Political offices
Preceded by Phumtham Wechayachai as Acting Prime Minister	Prime Minister of Thailand; 2024–2025	Succeeded by Suriya Juangroongruangkit as Acting Prime Minister
Party political offices
Preceded by Chusak Sirinil; Acting	Leader of Pheu Thai Party; 2023–2025	Succeeded by Chusak Sirinil; Acting
Honorary titles
New title	Head of the Pheu Thai Family; 2022–2023	Succeeded by Herself; 2025
Preceded by Herself; 2023	Head of the Pheu Thai Family; 2025–present	Incumbent
