= Premiership of Thaksin Shinawatra =

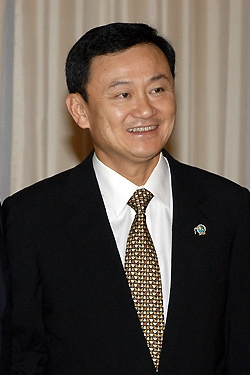
- Thaksin Shinawatra in 2003.
- Premiership of Thaksin Shinawatra; 9 February 2001 – 19 September 2006
- Monarch: Bhumibol Adulyadej
- Prime Minister: Thaksin Shinawatra
- Cabinet: First Thaksin cabinet; Second Thaksin cabinet
- Party: Thai Rak Thai
- Election: 2001 2005
- Nominated by: House of Representatives
- Appointed by: Monarch of Thailand
- Seat: Government House
- Seal of the Prime Minister

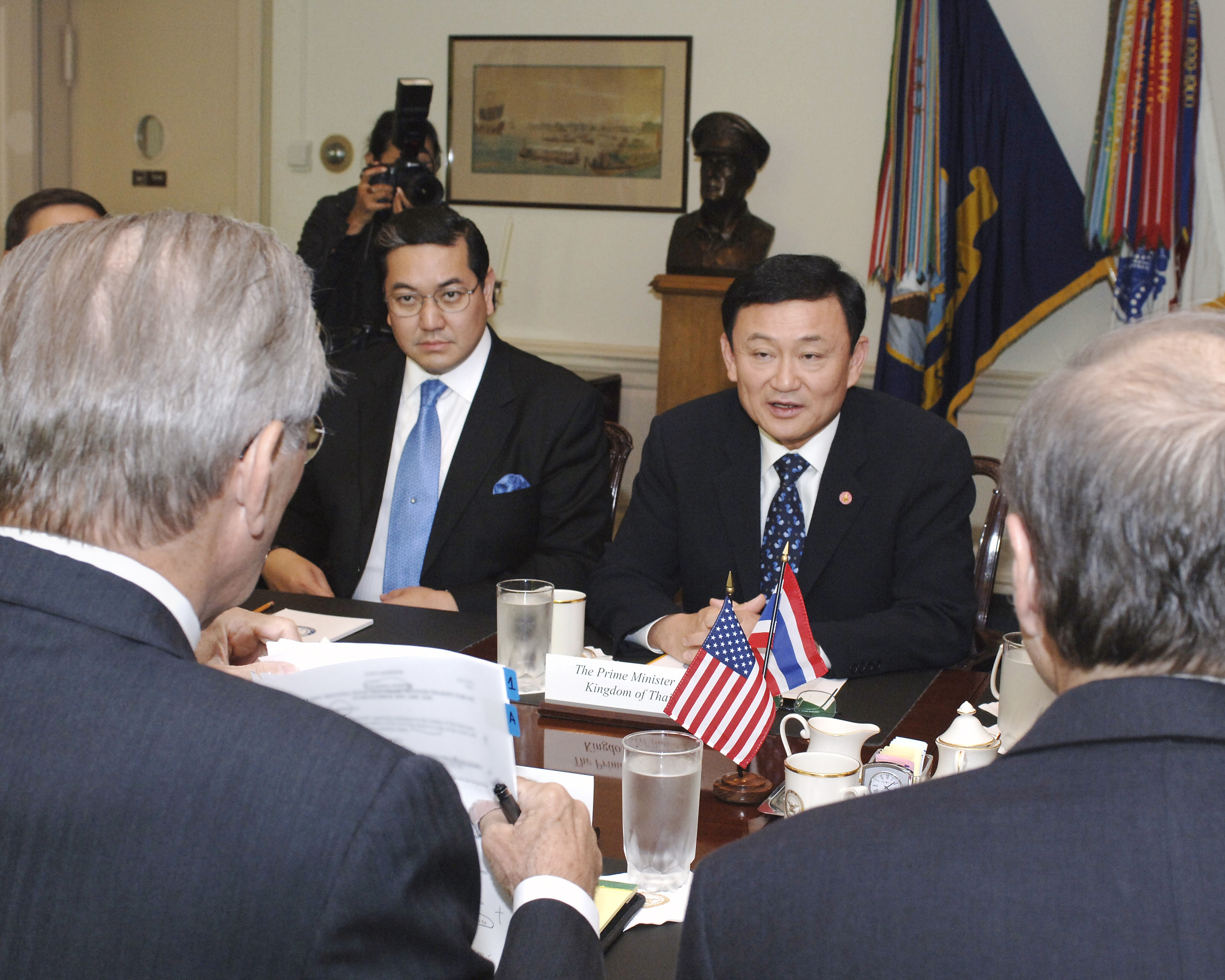
Prime Minister Thaksin Shinawatra and Deputy Prime Minister Surakiart Sathirathai on September 19, 2005

Thaksin Shinawatra was the 23rd prime minister of Thailand.

As prime minister, Thaksin Shinawatra initiated many policies affecting the economy, public health, education, energy, drugs and international relations. He gained two landslide re-election victories. He implemented substantial spending on rural programs, with over 30,000 villages receiving a total of B9.4 billion in FY2005 and the budgeted amount for FY2006 being raised to B19 billion, and provided affordable health coverage to the people. Because of this, his main support base has been the rural Thai.

His cabinet was packed with academics, former student leaders, and former leaders of the Palang Dharma Party, including Prommin Lertsuridej, Chaturon Chaisang, Prapat Panyachatraksa, Surapong Suebwonglee, Somkid Jatusripitak, Surakiart Sathirathai, and Sudarat Keyuraphan. Traditional leaders of regional coalitions also became members of his cabinet.

His government has been frequently charged with dictatorship, demagogy, corruption, conflicts of interest, human rights offences, acting undiplomatically, using legal loopholes, and hostility towards a free press. A controversial leader, he has been the target of numerous allegations of lèse majesté, treason, usurping religious and royal authority, selling assets to international investors, religious desecration, and "siding with the forces of darkness".

== Economic policies ==
Thaksin's government designed its policies to appeal to the rural majority of voters, initiating programs such as village-managed microcredit development funds, low-interest agricultural loans, direct injections of cash into village development funds (the SML scheme), infrastructure development, and the One Tambon One Product (OTOP), rural small and medium enterprise development program.

Thaksinomics, Thaksin's economic policies helped to accelerate Thailand's economic recovery from the 1997 Asian financial crisis and reduced poverty. The GDP grew from THB4.9 trillion at the end of 2001 to THB7.1 trillion at the end of 2006. Between 2000 and 2004, income in the poorest part of the country, the northeast, rose 40% while nationwide poverty fell from 21.3% to 11.3%. The Stock Exchange of Thailand outperformed other markets in the region. After facing fiscal deficits in 2001 and 2002, Thaksin balanced the national budget, producing comfortable fiscal surpluses for 2003 to 2005. Despite a massive program of infrastructure investments, a balanced budget was projected for 2007. Public sector debt fell from 57% of GDP in January 2001 to 41% in September 2006. Foreign exchange reserves doubled from US$30 billion in 2001 to US$64 billion in 2006.

However, critics charge that Thaksinomics was little more than a Keynesian-style economic stimulus policy re-branded as something new and revolutionary. Economists from the Thailand Development Research Institute argue that other factors, such as a revival in export demand, were the primary causes behind the economy's recovery. Others charge that the policies got the rural poor "hooked on Thaksin's hand-outs."

Thaksin helped bring part of Thailand's massive underground lottery system into the legal fold by operating a successful numbers game (Thai: หวย) run by the Government Lottery Office. Lottery sales of approximately 70 billion baht (US$2 billion) are used for social projects, including the "One District, One Scholarship" program which provided one student from a low-income family in each district with a scholarship to study overseas. Soon after Thaksin was deposed, the junta banned the lottery, claiming it was a social vice. This lured the poor away from work into gambling addiction. In addition, the supreme court ruled that the cabinet did not have the right to introduce the lottery without due process. The scholarship program was also stopped. The military junta also claimed that Thaksin's government "mischievously spent the proceeds in any way it saw fit".

The Thaksin government reduced the state's control of the media by privatizing MCOT, a large television and radio broadcaster.

After the 2006 coup, some of Thaksin's economic policies were ended. The OTOP program was rebranded, the Government Lottery Office program was deemed illegal. The government also nationalized several media outlets and energy companies.

== Healthcare policies ==
Thaksin initiated two key healthcare policies: subsidized universal health care and low-cost universal access to anti-retroviral HIV medication (ARVs). Thaksin's 30-baht/visit universal healthcare program won the applause of the general public, but was criticized by many doctors and officials. Prior to the program's introduction, a large portion of the population had no health insurance and limited access to healthcare. The program helped increase access to healthcare from 76% of the population to 96% of the population. Unfortunately, the program increased workloads for healthcare employees and caused many doctors to switch to higher paying careers. It has been also criticized for being greatly underfunded. The financial losses caused by the program led some hospitals to seek alternative sources of income, leading to a boom in the medical tourism industry, with 1.3 million foreign patients earning Thailand 33 billion THB (approx. US$800 million) in 2005.

Post-coup Public Health Minister Mongkol Na Songkhla called the 30-baht program a "marketing gimmick" and claimed that the government would stop charging any fees for visits to state hospitals.

During the Thaksin government, the number of people living with HIV/AIDS as well as the overall prevalence rate noticeably declined, as fewer were being infected. Although successful in expanding access to HIV medication, there are concerns that a free trade agreement with the US could endanger Thailand's ability to produce generic HIV treatments.

Thaksin allowed an estimated 2.3 million foreign workers in Thailand to register and seek health coverage under the Thai national healthcare system. They were also eligible for work permits at the end of the registration period, entitling them to full labor protection. Democrat Party Labour Group Committee Pongsak Plengsaeng criticized the move, claiming that it would lead to unemployment amongst Thais.

== Anti-drug policies ==
Thaksin initiated several highly controversial policies to destroy the Thai illicit drug market, particularly methamphetamines. After earlier anti-drug policies such as border blocking (most methamphetamine found in Thailand is produced in Myanmar), public education, sports, and promoting peer pressure against drug use proved more or less ineffective, Thaksin launched a multi-pronged suppression campaign that aimed to eradicate methamphetamine use in three months. It increased punishment for drug addicts, set provincial arrest and seizure targets, rewarded government officials for achieving targets and eliminating dealers, and ordered a "ruthless" implementation.

In the first three months, Human Rights Watch reported that 2,275 people were killed. The government claimed that only around 50 of the deaths were at the hands of the police. Human rights critics say a large number were extrajudicially murdered. The government went out of its way to publicize the campaign, through daily announcements of arrest, seizure, and death statistics.

According to the Narcotics Control Board, the policy was effective in reducing drug consumption, especially in schools.

King Bhumibol, in his 2003 birthday speech, attempted to criticize the prime minister in a subtle manner by assuming some accountability for the casualties of the war on drug as well as requested the commander of the police to categorize deaths: those killed by police and those killed by fellow drug dealers. Police Commander Sant Sarutanond reopened investigations into the deaths, and again found that few of the deaths were at the hands of the police. Thaksin's anti-drug approach was widely criticized by international community. Thaksin requested that the UN Commission on Human Rights send a special envoy to evaluate the situation, but said in an interview, "The United Nations is not my father. I am not worried about any UN visit to Thailand on this issue."

After the 2006 coup, the military junta ordered another investigation into the anti-drug campaign. Former Attorney General Kanit Na Nakhon chaired the special investigative committee. "The special committee will be tasked with an investigation to find out the truth about the deaths as well as to identify remedial measures for their relatives", said Justice Minister Charnchai Likhitjittha. The committee found that as many as 1400 of the 2500 killed had no link to drugs. However, while giving the opinion that orders to kill came from the top, the panel failed to establish sufficient evidence to charge Thaksin directly with the murders.

The Nation (an English-language newspaper in Thailand) reported on 27 November 2007:

Of 2,500 deaths in the government's war on drugs in 2003, a fact-finding panel has found that more than half was not involved in drugs at all. At a brainstorming session, a representative from the Office of Narcotics Control Board (ONCB) Tuesday disclosed that as many as 1,400 people were killed and labeled as drug suspects despite the fact that they had no link to drugs .... Senior public prosecutor Kunlapon Ponlawan said it was not difficult to investigate extra-judicial killings carried out by police officers as the trigger-pullers usually confessed.

== Corruption ==
Transparency International reported that Thailand's reputation for transparency among business executives improved during the years of the Thaksin government. In 2001, Thailand's Corruption Perceptions Index (CPI) was 3.2 (ranked 61st), whereas in 2005, the CPI was 3.8 (ranked 59th).

A study of Worldwide Governance Indicators by the World Bank gave a lower score on "Control of Corruption" during 2002–2005, the period of Thaksin's government, compared to 1998-2000's earlier government. Thaksin himself has consistently denied any wrongdoing by himself or his Thai Rak Thai party.

In 2008, Thaksin was found guilty of corruption and sentenced to two years in prison by the Thai Supreme Court.

== Education policies ==
Thaksin implemented a major series of educational reforms during his government. Chief among those reforms was school decentralization, as mandated by the 1997 People's Constitution. The policy was designed to delegated school management from the over-centralized and bureaucratized Ministry of Education to Tambon Administrative Organizations (TAOs). The plan met with massive widespread opposition from Thailand's 700,000 teachers, who would be deprived of their status as civil servants. There was also widespread fear from teachers that TAOs lack the skills and capabilities required to manage schools. In the face of massive teacher protests and several threats of school closure, Thaksin compromised and gave teachers whose schools were transferred to TAO management two years to transfer to other schools.

Other reforms included learning reform and related curricular decentralization, mostly through greater use of holistic education and less use of rote learning.

To increase access to universities for lower income people, Thaksin initiated the Student Loan Fund (SLF) and Income Contingency Loan (ICL) programs. The ICL granted loans regardless of financial status, and required recipients to start repayments when their salaries reach 16,000 Baht a month, with an interest rate equivalent to inflation from the day the loan was granted. The SLF had an eligibility limit on family income but carried interest of 1%, starting one year after graduation. The programs were merged and the income limit modified after Thaksin's government was overthrown.

Thaksin also initiated the controversial "One District, One Dream School" project, aimed at developing the quality of schools to ensure that every district has at least one high-quality school. The project was criticized, with some claiming that the only beneficiaries were Thaksin and companies selling computers and educational equipment. Many schools also fell deeply into debt in implementing the project, receiving less than adequate financial support from the central government.

In addition, Thaksin altered the state university entrance system. Whereas the former system relied exclusively on a series of nationally standardized exams, Thaksin pushed for a greater emphasis on senior high-school grades, claiming this would focus students on classroom learning rather than private entrance exam tutoring.

Thaksin initiated the Income Contingency Loan program to increase access to higher education. Under the program, needy students may secure a loan to support their studies from vocational to university levels. Thai banks had traditionally not given education loans. Thaksin made Thailand one of the first supporters of Nicholas Negroponte's One Laptop Per Child (OLPC) project, with the Thai Ministry of Education committing to purchase 600,000 units. However, the military junta later cancelled the project.

== Energy policies ==
In energy policy, the Thaksin government continued the Chuan Leekpai government's privatization agenda, but with important changes. Whereas the Chuan government's post-Asian financial crisis policies sought economic efficiency through industry fragmentation and wholesale power pool competition, Thaksin's policies aimed to create national champions that could reliably support stronger economic growth and become important players in regional energy markets. Thaksin also initiated a policy to encourage renewable energy and energy conservation. Many Thaksin-era energy policies were reversed following the 2006 coup.

== South Thailand insurgency ==
A resurgence in violence began in 2001 in the three southernmost provinces of Thailand which all have a Muslim, ethnic Malay majority. There is much controversy about the causes of this escalation of the decades long insurgency. Attacks after 2001 concentrated on police, the military, and schools, but civilians have also been targets. Thaksin has been widely criticized for his management of the situation, in particular the storming of the Krue Se Mosque, the deaths of civilian protesters at Tak Bai in army custody, and the unsolved kidnapping of Muslim-lawyer Somchai Neelapaijit.

In October 2004, 84 Muslim human rights protesters were killed at Tak Bai when the army broke up a peaceful protest. The many detainees were forced at gunpoint to lie prone in army trucks, stacked like cordwood. The trucks were delayed from moving to the detainment area for hours. Many detainees suffocated to death due to gross mishandling by the military. After the 2006 coup, the army dropped all charges and investigations into army misconduct related to the Tak Bai incident. Thaksin announced an escalation of military and police activity in the region. In July 2005, Thaksin enacted an emergency decree to manage the three troubled provinces. Several human rights organizations expressed their concerns that the decree might be used to violate civil liberties.

In March 2005, Thaksin established the National Reconciliation Commission, chaired by former prime minister Anand Panyarachun to oversee efforts to bring peace to the troubled south. In its final report released in June 2006, the commission proposed introducing Islamic law and making Pattani-Malay (Yawi) an official language in the region. The Thaksin administration assigned a government committee to study the report, while Muslims urged the government to act faster in implementing the proposals.

== Administrative reform ==
=== Ministerial restructuring ===
One of the most visible of Thaksin's administrative reforms was the restructuring of government department and ministries, labeled the "big bang." It was hailed as a "historic breakthrough" and "the first major reorganization of ministries since King Chulalongkorn set up Thailand's modern system of departmental government in 1897." Such a restructuring had been studied for years as a means of undermining the perceived rigidities and inertia of the old system, but was never implemented until the Thaksin government.

The restructuring was designed to streamline the bureaucracy and focus it on performance and results. New ministries were carved out in Social and Human Security Development, Tourism and Sports, Natural Resources and Environment, Information and Communication Technology, and Culture.

=== CEO-governors ===
Thaksin transformed the role of provincial governors from ceremonial supervisors of ministry officials to active managers of government policy. Historically, central government ministries operated in the provinces through field offices headed by senior officials, who reported back to Bangkok. The Ministry of Interior appointed provincial governors whose role was largely ceremonial.

A key component of Thaksin's administrative reform policy, "CEO-governors" epitomized Thaksin's "transformation of the operating style of the traditional bureaucracy into a more results-oriented instrument that would be responsive". Piloted in 2001 and introduced in all provinces in October 2003, CEO-governors were put in charge of planning and coordinating provincial development and became accountable for overall provincial affairs. The "CEO governors" were assisted by "provincial CFOs" from the Ministry of Finance who reported directly to each governor. The CEO-governors were authorized to raise funds by issuing bonds and were given an intensive training course. After the coup, the junta reverted the role of governors.

=== Foreign policies ===
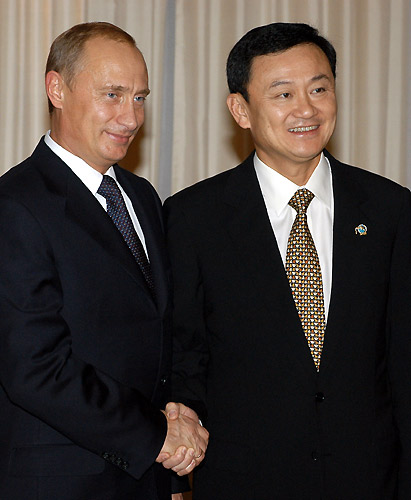
Shinawatra with then President of Russia Vladimir Putin at APEC Bangkok 2003 on 21 October 2003 in Bangkok.

Thaksin was fiercely attacked for tasking diplomats with supporting domestic economic programs, e.g., promoting OTOP products. Surapong Jayanama, former ambassador to Vietnam claiming that Thaksin's policies were "demeaning" and would do little to enhance Thailand's international stature.

Thaksin also initiated negotiations for several free trade agreements with China, Australia, Bahrain, India, and the US. This policy was also criticized, with claims that high-cost Thai industries could be wiped out.

Thailand joined George W. Bush's multinational coalition in the invasion of Iraq, sending a 423-strong humanitarian contingent. It withdrew its troops on 10 September 2004. Two Thai soldiers died in Iraq in an insurgent attack.

Thaksin announced that Thailand would forsake foreign aid, and work with donor countries to assist in the development of neighbors in the Greater Mekong Sub-region.

Thaksin was attacked by influential former diplomats for acting undiplomatically with foreign leaders. Kasit Pirom, former Thai ambassador to Japan and the United States, noted at an anti-Thaksin rally "When Khun Thaksin went to the United Nations to attend a joint UN-Asean session, he did not behave properly when addressing the session, which was co-chaired by the UN secretary-general and the Malaysian premier. In his address Thaksin did not mention the name of the Malaysian premier".

Thaksin established close, friendly ties with the Burmese dictatorship, including extending the neighboring country a four billion baht credit line so it could conclude a satellite telecom deal with his family business. During the time Thaksin was in office as prime minister, he was ambitious about making Thailand a regional leader. He proposed, and was supported by other South East Asian countries, an economic treaty at the sub-regional level, to promote economic, technological, and infrastructure development. His government also provided economic assistance to neighbouring countries Laos and Cambodia.

Thaksin has been attacked for his support of former Deputy Prime Minister Surakiart Sathirathai's failed campaign to become UN Secretary General.

=== 2005 re-election campaign ===
Under the slogans "Four Years of Repair – Four years of Reconstruction" and "Building Opportunities", Thaksin and the Thai Rak Thai Party (TRT) party won landslide victories in the February 2005 elections, sweeping 374 out of 500 seats in Parliament. The election had the highest voter turnout in Thai history.

=== Suvarnabhumi Airport ===
After more than 30 years of planning and debate, the Thaksin government completed construction of the new Suvarnabhumi Airport, one of the world's largest. The airport was officially opened a week after the overthrow of the government. Some members of Thaksin's government were accused of corruption while overseeing the construction of Suvarnabhumi Airport.

=== Other criticisms ===
There have also been complaints that Thaksin-appointed relatives to senior positions in the civil service and independent commissions, for example by elevating his cousin, General Chaiyasit Shinawatra, to Army commander-in-chief. In August 2002, he was promoted from Deputy Commander of the Armed Forces Development Command to become Deputy Army Chief. Both General Chaiyasit and Defense Minister General Chavalit Yongchaiyudh denied charges of nepotism at the time. General Chaiyasit replaced General Somthad Attanan as Army commander-in-chief. However, General Chaiyasit was replaced by General Prawit Wongsuwan in August 2004, after only a year in office. His replacement was in response to an escalation of violence in southern Thailand. Prawit was succeeded by Sonthi Boonyaratglin in 2005.

Thaksin was also accused of interference after the Senate appointed Wisut Montriwat (former Deputy Permanent Secretary of the Ministry of Finance) to the position of Auditor General, replacing Jaruvan Maintaka.

Respected former Thai ambassador to the UN Asda Jayanama, in an anti-Thaksin rally, claimed that Thaksin's two state visits to India were made in order to negotiate a satellite deal for Thaksin's family-owned Shin Corporation. The accusation was countered by Foreign Minister Kantathi Suphamongkhon, who attended the state visits with Thaksin.

Thaksin's government has been accused of exerting political influence in its crackdown on unlicensed community radio stations.

Thaksin often faced harsh comparisons. Social critic Prawase Wasi compared him to AIDS, Privy Council President Prem Tinsulanonda and Senator Banjerd Singkaneti compared him to Hitler, Democrat spokesman Ong-art Klampaibul compared him to Saddam Hussein, and the newspaper The Nation compared him to Pol Pot.

Thaksin has been engaged in a series of lawsuits brought by American businessman William L Monson regarding a cable-television joint venture the two partnered in during the 1980s.

== See also ==
- Presidency of Rodrigo Duterte
- Philippine drug war
