= Finland Plot =

Conspiracy theory of a coup in Thailand

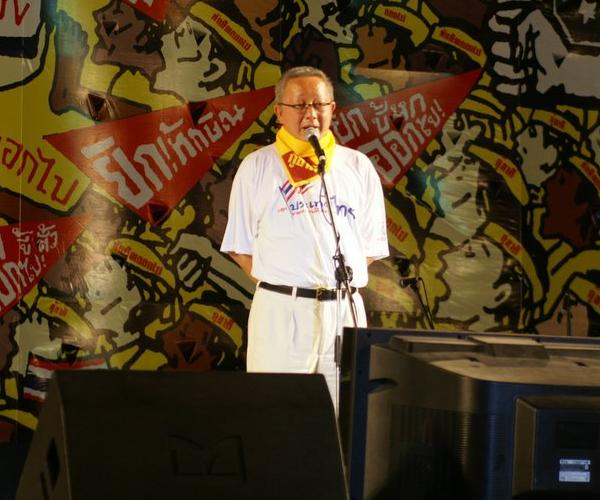
Sondhi speaking at a mass rally, February 2006

In Thai politics, the Finland Plot, Finland Plan, Finland Strategy, Finland Conspiracy or Finland Declaration (Thai: แผนฟินแลนด์, ยุทธศาสตร์ฟินแลนด์, ปฏิญญาฟินแลนด์, Finnish: Suomi-salaliitto, Suomi-suunnitelma, Suomi-strategia) are names of a controversial conspiracy theory espoused by Sondhi Limthongkul and supporters affiliated with the People's Alliance for Democracy (PAD) in 2006 describing a plot allegedly developed by Thai Prime Minister Thaksin Shinawatra and former left-wing student leaders to overthrow the former Thai monarch, take control of the nation, and establish a communist state. The plot allegedly originated in Finland.

The allegations damaged the popularity of Thaksin and his government, despite the fact that no evidence was ever produced to verify the existence of a plot. Thaksin and his Thai Rak Thai (TRT) party vehemently denied the accusations and sued the accusers. The leaders of the 2006 military coup claimed Thaksin's alleged disloyalty as one of their rationales for seizing power.

== Background ==
Protests against Thai Prime Minister Thaksin Shinawatra increased throughout 2005 and 2006 due to a variety of factors, including his April 2005 appearance at a merit-making ceremony at the Temple of the Emerald Buddha, the September 2005 cancellation of Sondhi Limthongkul's Muangthai Raisabdah television show, Thaksin's November 2005 plan to give local communities control of public schools, Thaksin's sale of Shin Corporation in January 2006, and Thaksin's alleged role in the March 2006 destruction of the Phra Phrom Erawan shrine.

== Conspiracy theory ==
In May 2006, on the eve of King Bhumibol Adulyadej's 60th anniversary celebrations, the Sondhi Limthongkul-owned Manager Daily newspaper published the details of what it called the "Finland Plan," "Finland Declaration," or "Finland Strategy." The articles claimed that Thaksin and former student leaders of Thailand's 1970s democratic movement met in Finland in 1999 to develop a plan to institute rule by a single party, overthrow the monarchy and establish a republic, and hold elections for provincial governors. The 5-part article was titled "Finland Strategy: Thailand's Revolution Plan?" was written by Pramote Nakhonthap and appeared on 17, 19, 22, 23 and 24 May 2006. Thaksin's alleged co-conspirators apparently included Thai Rak Thai party members Prommin Lertsuridej (Secretary-General to the Premier), Chaturon Chaisaeng (Deputy Prime Minister), Surapong Suebwonglee (Minister of Information and Communications Technology), Adisorn Piangket (Former Deputy Science Minister), Sutham Saengprathum (Deputy Interior Minister), and Phumtham Wechayachai (Deputy Transport Minister), all of whom had been affiliated with the Communist Party of Thailand following the massacre of 6 October 1976.

The allegations were taken up by several prominent critics, including leaders of the People's Alliance for Democracy, constitution drafter Chai-anan Samudavanija, Senator Sophon Supapong, writer Pramote Nakornthab, and Democrat leader Thaworn Senniam.

None of the accusers provided any evidence to back up their allegations. Sondhi noted that his source was a Thai Rak Thai worker who had recently "defected."

=== Variations and denials ===
Variations of the original theory were also proposed, including the claim that the plot involved overseas groups intent on overthrowing the Chakri dynasty, the claim that media consolidation was a core component of the conspiracy, the claim that the Plan was aimed at maintaining a constitutional monarchy while reducing the powers of the monarch to a mere figurehead, and the claim that a law designed to further decentralize central administrative power to the Thai provinces, and the claim that Thaksin wanted to establish a government based on the model of western democracies.

Another variation claimed that Thaksin's co-conspirators were former members of the Communist Party of Thailand including Deputy Transport Minister Phumtham Wechayachai and had applied a theory of orthodox Marxism to map out the TRT strategy to promote capitalism. This variation claimed that Thailand during the 1970s was still a semi-feudal society and needed to become a capitalist society as part of the transition to socialism. The communists then worked with Thaksin to fully develop Thailand's capitalist economic system, destroy all remnants of feudalism, and privatize state-owned assets, while at the same time establishing a single-party dictatorship, all in order to create a socialist dictatorship.

The allegations were roundly denied by Thaksin Shinawatra and the leadership of his Thai Rak Thai party, including Surapong Suebwonglee and Prommin Lertsuridej.

On 30 May, Thaksin Shinawatra and Thana Benjathikul, a lawyer from the Thai Rak Thai party, sued Sondhi, editor Khunthong Lorserivanich, columnist Pramote Nakhonthap, executive Saowalak Thiranujanyong, and webmaster Panjapat Angkhasuwan for libel. The lawsuit alleged that the articles were intended to ruin Thai Rak Thai and Thaksin's political future by making the public believe the party was planning to overturn the constitutional monarchy. Thaksin's lawsuit attracted criticism and claims that Thaksin was trying to censor the media.

== Impact of the allegations ==
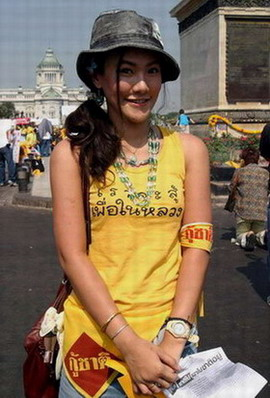
An anti-Thaksin protester wears a tank top with the Thai slogan "We will fight for the King".

The allegations damaged the popularity of Thaksin and his government. Thaksin was forced to expend a significant amount of time and political capital on damage control, explaining his position and swearing his loyalty to the monarchy.

In an editorial, the influential anti-Thaksin newspaper The Nation noted:

Whether or not such a plot really exists may be impossible to prove. But Sondhi and the others should know better than to stir up an already volatile political situation with irresponsible accusations that have a potential to inflame further hatred and violence between opposing groups.

The Nation noted that the actual existence of the Plot was not important—the mere invocation of royalty would be enough to damage the Thai Rak Thai party. Many commentators noted the similarity between the Finland Plot allegations and the allegations used justify the massacre of students on 6 October 1976, which in the context of the Thailand political crisis, might justify a military coup. The Thai military eventually successfully executed a coup against the Thaksin government on 19 September 2006. One of the junta's stated rationales for the coup was that Thaksin had insulted the King.
