= Anan Chaisaeng =

Thai police officer and politician (1927–2023)

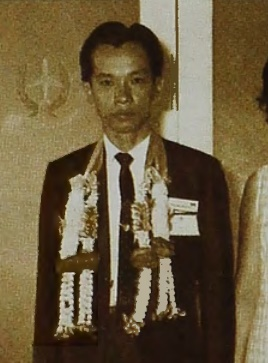
- Chaisaeng in 1957

Member of the House of Representatives of Thailand
- In office 10 February 1969 – 12 January 1976
- In office 18 April 1983 – 27 July 1986
- In office 6 January 2001 – 6 February 2005

Personal details
- Born: 20 January 1927 Bang Pakong district, Siam
- Died: 23 November 2023 (aged 96) Bang Pakong district, Thailand
- Party: Progress Party; TRT
- Children: Chaturon Chaisang
- Occupation: Police officer

Anan Chaisaeng (also spelled Anant, Thai: อนันต์ ฉายแสง; 20 January 1927 – 23 November 2023) was a Thai police officer and politician. A member of the Progress Party and later the Thai Rak Thai Party, he thrice served in the House of Representatives: from 1969 to 1976, from 1983 to 1986, and from 2001 to 2005.

Chaisaeng died in Bang Pakong district on 23 November 2023, at the age of 96.
