= Sudarat Keyuraphan =

Thai politician

Khun Ying Sudarat Keyuraphan
- สุดารัตน์ เกยุราพันธุ์
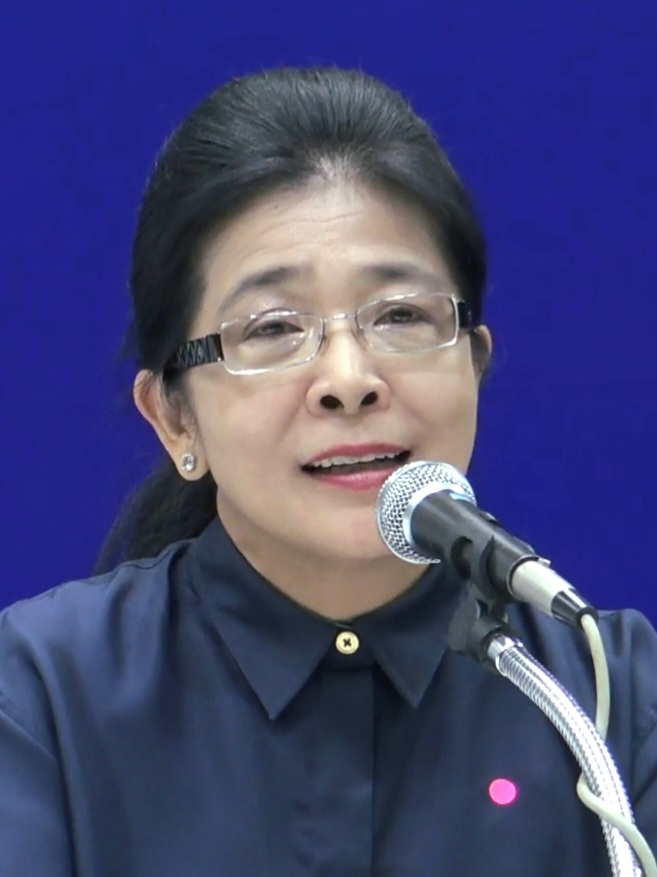
- Sudarat Keyuraphan in 2020

Minister of Agriculture and Cooperatives
- In office 11 March 2005 – 19 September 2006
- Prime Minister: Thaksin Shinawatra
- Preceded by: Wan Muhamad Noor Matha
- Succeeded by: Theera Sutabut

Minister of Public Health
- In office 17 February 2001 – 10 March 2005
- Prime Minister: Thaksin Shinawatra
- Preceded by: Korn Dabbaransi
- Succeeded by: Suchai Charoenratanakul

Deputy Minister of the Interior
- In office 28 May 1996 – 14 August 1996
- Prime Minister: Banharn Silpa-archa
- Preceded by: Suchart Tancharoen
- Succeeded by: Arsa Meksawan

Deputy Minister of Transport
- In office 25 October 1994 – 19 May 1995
- Prime Minister: Chuan Leekpai
- Preceded by: Jarad Phuachuai
- Succeeded by: Sombat Uthaisang

Leader of the Thai Sang Thai Party
- In office 9 September 2022 – 12 February 2026
- Succeeded by: TBA

Personal details
- Born: 1 May 1961 (age 65) Bangkok, Thailand
- Party: Thai Sang Thai (2021–Present)
- Other political affiliations: Palang Dharma (1992–1998); Thai Rak Thai (1998–2007); Pheu Thai (2012–2020)
- Spouse: Somyos Leelapanyalert
- Children: 3
- Education: Chulalongkorn University (BS and MBA); Mahachulalongkornrajavidyalaya University (PhD)

Military service
- Allegiance: Thailand
- Branch/service: Volunteer Defense Corps
- Rank: VDC Col

Sudarat Keyuraphan (Thai: สุดารัตน์ เกยุราพันธุ์, pronounced [sù(ʔ).dāː.rát kēː.jú(ʔ).rāː.pʰān]) is a Thai politician and former member of the Pheu Thai Party. She participated in protests in May 1992. She is a former minister who held various positions during the Thaksin Shinawatra and Chuan Leekpai governments. Currently, she is the chairman of the Thai Pueng Thai Foundation, as well as the founder, and leader of the Thai Sang Thai Party.

== Family and personal life ==
Sudarat was born on 1 May 1961 in Bangkok to Sompon Keyurapan and Renu Keyuraphan. Her father was the former Member of Parliament from Nakhon Ratchasima Province. Sudarat is married to Somyos Leelapunyalert, who is a real estate entrepreneur. They have 2 sons and 1 daughter, including,

1. Phumphat Leelapunyalert (Boss)
2. Peeraphat Leelapunyalert (Best)
3. Yossuda Leelapunyalert (Jinny)

Sudarat graduated high-school from St. Joseph Convent School in Bangkok. She earned her bachelor's degree from Chulalongkorn University in commerce and accountancy and a master's degree from the Sasin Graduate Institute of Business Administration. In 2018, she earned her doctoral degree in Buddhist studies from Mahachulalongkornrajavidyalaya University and received an honorary Doctorate Degree in Arts Department of Social and Environmental Development from Nakhon Phanom University Council

== Political work ==
Sudarat began her political career as part of the Palang Dharma Party, being elected an MP for Bangkok's District 12 in the election of March 1992. She was reelected in September of the same year and was appointed deputy government spokesperson for Chuan Leekpai's Government.

In 1994, Sudarat was appointed Secretary-General of the Palang Dharma Party and was also appointed Deputy Minister of Transport.

In the 1995 Election, Sudarat was re-elected MP and was appointed Deputy Minister of Interior in Banharn Silpa-archa's Government.

In 1996, Sudarat was once again elected MP and was the only member to be elected from Palang Dharma.

Two years later, in 1998, Sudarat co-founded the Thai Rak Thai Party together with Thaksin Shinawatra and 21 others, including Somkid Jatusripitak, Thanong Bidaya, Purachai Piumsombun, Thammarak Isaragura na Ayuthaya, and Prommin Lertsuridej. Sudarat was appointed Deputy Leader of Thai Rak Thai

In the 2001 election, Sudarat was elected a Member of Parliament and was appointed Minister of Public Health on February 17, 2001 under the Thaksin government. She was involved in a long-running scandal over the purchase of overpriced computers for hospitals by the Ministry of Public Health.

The 2006 election saw her party win over 61% of the vote, becoming the largest party, and Sudarat was appointed Minister of Agriculture and Cooperatives. She lost her position following the September 2006 coup.

As one of 111 executive members of the TRT, she was banned from political activities for five years after the 2006 coup d'état.

Sudarat later returned to Thai politics, contesting the 2019 election as a party-list MP and prime ministerial candidate for the Pheu Thai Party. However, although the party won the most constituency seats, it did not win any party-list seats.

Later, Sudarat has resigned from the Pheu Thai Party and co-founded the Thai Sang Thai Party and served as the leader.

== Social role ==
Sudarat established the Foundation for Women for Democracy and a group of women and politics in 1993, which later evolved into an institution of women and politics (To encourage women to have knowledge and understanding of Thai politics and to be more interested in participating in political activities). In 1998, she established the "Thai Pueng Thai" project to help unemployed women to have jobs and build their own careers when the country experienced an economic crisis.

In 2011, Sudarat was appointed to be the chairman of “Together...to assist all victims and fight national disasters” project under the Miracle of Life Foundation in honor of Princess Ubolratana Rajakanya Siriwattana Phannawadee and is a chairman of the Thai Pueng Thai Foundation, Founding Chairman of the Sang Thai Institute and Leader of the Thai Sang Thai Party

== Notable awards and honors ==
- 1996 - Thailand Tatler Award “Most talked about personality of the year”
- 1997 – Notable Alumni Awards from Faculty of Commerce and Accountancy from Chulalongkorn University
- 2003 – Tobacco-Free World Award from WHO
- 2003 – Mental Health Princess Award in supporting Mental health from Her Royal Highness Princess Galyani Vadhana
- 2014 – World Buddhist Outstanding Leader Award from World Fellowship of Buddhists
- 2015 – Asoka Pilla Trophy Religion Leader from The Association of Distinguished Contributors to Buddhism of Thailand

== Honours ==
Sudarat has received the following royal decorations in the Honours System of Thailand:

- 1999 - Knight Grand Cordon (Special Class) of the Most Exalted Order of the White Elephant
- 1996 - Knight Grand Cordon (Special Class) of the Most Noble Order of the Crown of Thailand
- 2005 - Knight Grand Cross (First Class) of the Most Admirable Order of the Direkgunabhorn
- 2005 - Member of the Most Illustrious Order of Chula Chom Klao

Political offices
Preceded by Charat Phuachuai	Deputy Minister of Transport; 1994–1995 with Thawee Kraikupt (1992–1994); Anek Thapsuwan (1993–1995); Phinij Jarusombat (1993–1995); Dej Boonlang (1994–1995)	Succeeded by Sombat Uthaisang; Phiraphong Thanomphongphan; Somsak Thepsuthin; Chaiyaphak Siriwath
Preceded by Suthas Ngernmuen; Udon Tantisunthon; Phairoj Losunthon	Deputy Minister of Interior; 1995–1996 with Suchart Tancharoen (1995–1996); Kiattichai Chaichaowarat (1995–1996); Sornchai Montriwat (1995–1996); Anusorn Wongwan (1995)	Succeeded by Asa Meksavan
Preceded by Korn Dabbaransi	Minister of Public Health; 2001–2005	Succeeded by Suchai Charoenratanakul
Preceded by Wan Muhamad Noor Matha	Minister of Agriculture and Cooperatives; 2005–2006	Vacant Title next held by Theera Sutabut
Assembly seats
Vacant Title last held by Sanya Sathirabut; Samut Mongkonkiti	Members of the House of Representatives for Bangkok, 12th District; 1992 with Krasae Chanawongse (1992–1995); Suthon Chuensomchit	Succeeded by Paveena Hongsakul; Sombat Rotphothong
Preceded by Chaiyawat Sinthuwong	Members of the House of Representatives for Bangkok, 7th District; 1992–2000 with Chinnawut Sunthonsima (1992–1995); Thamrong Saengsuriyachan (1992–1995); Pracha Kunakasem (1995–1996); Chaiyawat Sinthuwong (1995–1996); Thiwa Ngenyuang (1996–2000); Subsaeng Phrombun (1996–2000)	Succeeded by Charoen Khanthawong
Party political offices
New political party	Leader of Thai Sang Thai Party; 2021–present	Incumbent
