= Suchai Charoenratanakul =

Thai politician and professor

Professor Suchai Charoenratanakul MD, FRCP(Edin.), FRCP(Lond.)
- สุชัย เจริญรัตนกุล
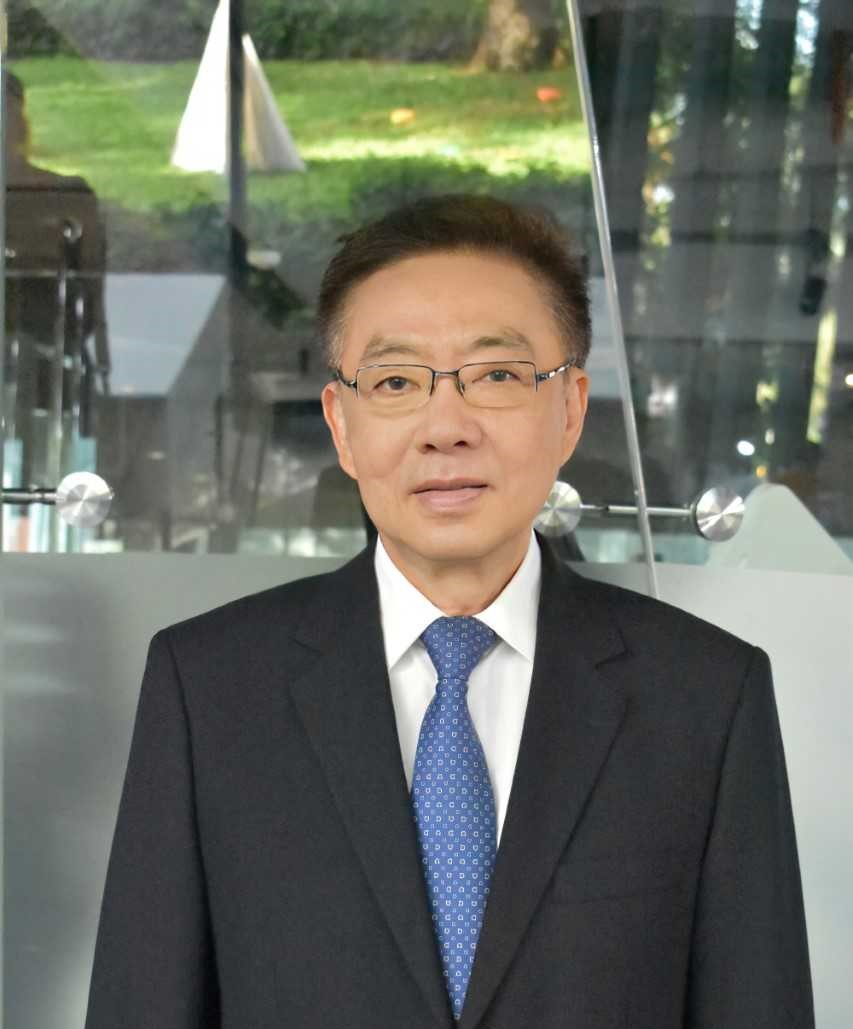

Deputy Prime Minister of Thailand
- In office 31 October 2005 – 19 September 2006
- Prime Minister: Thaksin Shinawatra

Minister of Public Health
- In office 11 March 2005 – 31 October 2005
- Prime Minister: Thaksin Shinawatra
- Preceded by: Sudarat Keyuraphan
- Succeeded by: Pinit Charusombat

Deputy Minister of Public Health
- In office 6 October 2004 – 11 March 2005
- Prime Minister: Thaksin Shinawatra

Personal details
- Born: 1 February 1955 (age 71) Lopburi, Thailand
- Profession: Professor of Medicine, Siriraj Hospital, Mahidol University

Suchai Charoenratanakul (Thai: สุชัย เจริญรัตนกุล, RTGS: Suchai Charoenrattanakun; born 1 February 1955) is a Thai professor of medicine born in Lopburi, Thailand who was Deputy Prime Minister and Minister of Public Health of the Thai government from 2004 to 2006. After the military coup in September 2006, he returned to Siriraj Medical School where he currently works as a professor and clinician.

== Early life and education ==
Suchai Charoenratanakul was born on 1 February 1955 in Lopburi province. He finished the high school education at Triam Udom Suksa school in Bangkok, and received his medical doctorate from Ramathibodi Medical School, Mahidol University in 1979.

After finishing his M.D, Dr. Suchai pursued his postgraduate training in the United Kingdom by taking a senior house officer (SHO) job in general medicine at Royal Victoria Infirmary in Newcastle upon Tyne in 1980–1982, Weston General Hospital in Weston-super-Mare in 1983–1984.

He qualified MRCP (UK) from the Royal Colleges of Physicians of London, Edinburgh and Glasgow in March 1984. From June 1984 – July 1985, he has been appointed as a registrar in general and chest medicine at Falkirk District Royal Infirmary, Falkirk, Scotland.

== Academic and research career ==
Dr Suchai returned to Thailand in August 1985 to take the position of Chest Physician and Lecturer at Siriraj Medical School, Mahidol University. He was promoted to assistant professor of medicine in 1987, and later associate professor of medicine in 1990. He was nominated to acquire FRCP from the Royal College of Physicians of Edinburgh and the Royal College of Physicians of London in 1994 and 1995 respectively. The breadth of researches, editorials, and book chapters that he contributed in this time is evidenced by the range of publications that came out with an outstanding reputation, so he was promoted to Professor of Medicine in 1996 when he was 41 years old.

Professor Suchai pursued his clinical and research interests in asthma, COPD, and tuberculosis. He has published over 100 papers, book chapters, editorials, and reviews on medical journals in Thai and English.

He wrote chapters on international textbooks such as Om P.Sharma, ed., Lung Diseases in the Tropics (New York: Marcel Dekker, 1991). Peter O'Davies, ed., Clinical Tuberculosis (London: Chapman & Hall Medical, 1998). Peter O'Davies, ed., Case History in Chest Diseases (London: Chapman & Hall Medical, 1999). Victor L. Yu, ed., Antimicrobial Therapy and Vaccines (New York: Apple Trees Productions, 2002).

From 2004 to 2006, Professor Suchai was the President of the Thoracic Society of Thailand. He was a member of the International Advisory Committee of the American Thoracic Society from 2003 to 2005. He was a part of the editorial board of Respirology (official journal of the Asian Pacific Society of Respirology) from 1999 to 2004 and Respiratory Medicine (Monthly peer-reviewed medical journal published by Elsevier) from 2000 to 2004.

Professor Suchai was the Congress President of the 4th World Asthma Meeting (WAM) held in Bangkok in 2004. The 4th WAM which held jointly by the American Thoracic Society, European Respiratory Society and American College of Chest Physicians was highly successful with more than 4,000 attendants around the world.

== Political career ==
Professor Suchai left the medical school in October 2004 to take up the post of Deputy Minister of Public Health, and subsequently was appointed to Minister of Public Health in March 2005.

During his time as the Minister of Public Health, Professor Suchai was appointed to act as a vice-president of the 58th WHO World Health Assembly held in Geneva, Switzerland, on 16 – 25 May 2005. At that time, the President of the Assembly was Ms. Elena Salgado of Spain. He served alongside four other delegates holding the title of vice president, whose nationalities included New Zealand, Uruguay, the United Arab Emirates, and the State of Eritrea. He was the first Thai Minister of Public Health to be elected to this post.

As Minister of Public Health, he organized the 6th Global Conference on Health Promotion with WHO at the United Nations Conference Centre in Bangkok, on 11 August 2005. The "Bangkok Charter 2005" for health promotion in a globalized world has been agreed upon by participants. It identified major challenges, actions, and commitments needed to address the determinants of health in a globalized world by reaching out to people, groups, and organizations that were critical to the achievement of health.

Professor Suchai successfully combated and controlled the Bird Flu pandemic in Thailand. He organized and chaired the International Partnership on Avian and Pandemic Influenza Meeting on 10 October 2005 at the United Nation Conference Centre in Bangkok to seek their collaboration in preparing for the anticipated public health emergency linked to the H5N1 strain of the disease. The meeting was attended by Mr. Michael Leavitt, the U.S. Health and Human Services Secretary, Dr. Lee Jongwook, Director of World Health Organization and Minister of Health from 12 countries in the Asia Pacific region including Singapore, China, and Japan.

Unexpectedly on 5 October 2005, Professor Suchai announced, for ethical reason, to resign his ministerial post on 31 October 2005 arising from influential political interference of high-ranking officer reshuffle at the Ministry of Public Health.

Given his track record in delivering results, the Prime Minister promoted Professor Suchai to the Deputy Prime Minister post on the same day of his resignation from the MOPH in a bid to keep him in the cabinet. Moreover, he was promoted to Acting Minister of Information Communication and Technology on 7 February 2006.

As Deputy Prime Minister, Professor Suchai represented the Thai Government to give a speech at the UN General Assembly Special Session on HIV/AIDS held in New York on 30 May 2006. The Heads of State and Government were invited to give a speech to declare their commitment to addressing the crisis through action. The Assembly was addressed by King of Swaziland, Prime Minister of Ireland, Prime Minister of Japan, Deputy Prime Minister of Thailand (Professor Suchai Charoenratanakul), and several other Heads of Government.

Professor Suchai held the posts of Deputy Prime Minister and Acting Minister of Information Communication and Technology until the Thai Army's coup d'état on 19 September 2006.

== Royal decorations ==
Professor Suchai has received the following royal decorations in the Honours System of Thailand:

- Knight Grand Cordon (Special Class) of the Most Exalted Order of the White Elephant
- Knight Grand Cordon (Special Class) of The Most Noble Order of the Crown of Thailand
