= Sophon Suphapong =

Sophon Suphapong (Thai: โสภณ สุภาพงษ์) (born, 12 September 1946) is a former Senator for Bangkok in the National Assembly of Thailand and the former President of Bangchak Petroleum.

Sophon served as the first president of state-owned Bangchak Petroleum company, which was established in 1984 to operate the Bangchak Refinery. In the 1990s, under his leadership, the company made several initiatives focused on community responsibility as well as environmental awareness, which helped him win the Ramon Magsaysay Award in 1998.

In 2005, Sophon accused the United States of being the mastermind behind bombings in the South Thailand insurgency. As a Senator, Sophon accused Prime Minister Thaksin Shinawatra of taking part in the Finland Plan and using gains from the privatization of state energy company PTT in a plan to overthrow the Chakri dynasty and establish a communist dictatorship. It was revealed in April 2007 that Sophon was paid by the military junta to criticize deposed Premier Thaksin Shinawatra following the 2006 Thailand coup. However, Sophon continued to deny that he received any payment.
