= Bangchak Corporation =

Petroleum and energy company in Thailand

- Type: Public Company Limited
- Traded as: SET: BCP
- ISIN: TH0420010Y01
- Industry: Resources/Energy & Utilities
- Founded: 8 November 1984; 41 years ago
- Headquarters: 2098 M Tower Building, 8th Floor, Sukhumvit Rd., Phra Khanong Tai, Phra Khanong Bangkok 10260
- Key people: Chaiwat Kovavisarach (Group CEO and President)
- Products: Oil, High Value Specialty Products, Non-oil, Bio-Based Products, Green Power, Energy, Natural Resource
- Revenue: ▲THB 385,853 million (2023)
- Total assets: THB 340,429 million (2023)
- EBITDA: ▲THB 41,680 million
- Website: www.bangchak.co.th

Bangchak Corporation Public Company Limited (BCP), previously known as Bangchak Petroleum, is a petroleum and energy conglomerate in Thailand. It was founded as a state-owned company in 1984, and is now listed on the Stock Exchange of Thailand, doing business in oil refining and retail, as well as sustainable energy through various subsidiaries.

== History ==
Bangchak Petroleum was established in accordance with a cabinet resolution of June 1984, during the Prem Tinsulanonda-led government, to operate the ailing state-owned Bangchak Refinery, as part of a restructuring project with assistance from the World Bank. Initially a state enterprise, the company ran its operations under the supervision of the finance minister. Its main missions were to refine oil and to produce petrol products for Thailand's domestic consumption.

Sophon Suphapong was the company's first president. In the 1990s, under his leadership, the company made several initiatives focused on community responsibility as well as environmental awareness, which helped Sophon win the Ramon Magsaysay Award in 1998.

In April 1993, the company was listed on the Stock Exchange of Thailand (SET) under the name of The Bangchak Petroleum Public Company Limited and began trading the following year (2 August 1994). The company ceased to be a state enterprise on 1 October 2001.

The company suffered heavily from the 1997 Asian financial crisis, and in 2001, the Finance Ministry reduced its shareholding percentage in Bangchak Petroleum. As a result, the company has not been a state enterprise since 1 October 2001.

In 2017, the company rebranded and changed its name to "Bangchak Corporation" to reflect it business operations, which had grown beyond petroleum refining and finished products retail.

The company now does business in oil refining and retail, as well as sustainable energy through various subsidiaries.

== Operations ==
Bangchak has numerous businesses and subsidiaries, all working towards sustainable energy development. These can be grouped into 5 main business groups, namely:

1.Refinery Business Group – refining and oil trading.Two complex refineries, Bangchak Phra Khanong Refinery in Bangkok and Bangchak Sriracha Refinery in Chonburi, with a combined nameplate capacity of almost 300,000 barrels per day.

2.Marketing Business Group - Distribution channel of over 2,200 service stations, as well as non-oil business with Inthanin Coffee, lubricants, EV charging stations, and restaurants.

3.Green Power Business, operated by BCPG Group – renewable energy (solar power, wind power, hydropower), natural gas, and smart energy (smart city).

4.Bio-Based Products Business, operated by BBGI – biofuels and by-products, as well as health and well-being products.

5.Natural Resources, investing in petroleum exploration and production through investments in OKEA ASA, Norway.

== Recent Developments ==
On 11 January 2023, Bangchak informed the Stock Exchange of Thailand that the company entered into the share purchase agreement with ExxonMobil for the acquisition of 65.99% of ordinary shares in Esso (Thailand) Public Company Limited, which was later approved by the Annual General Meeting of Bangchak Corporation Public Company Limited on 11 April 2023, and is expected to be completed in the second half of 2023.

The Trade Competition Commission of Thailand (TCCT) approved Bangchak's acquisition of shares in Esso (Thailand) Public Company Limited.

On 31 August 2023, Bangchak completed the acquisition of 65.99% of Esso (Thailand) shares, incorporating ESSO's service stations, products and aviation fuel under the Bangchak brand.

In 2023, Bangchak signed the construction agreement of a sustainable aviation fuel production unit in its oil refinery in Bangkok. The process incorporates pre-treatment and hydrotreated vegetable oil.
