= Sutham Sangprathum =

Thai politician (born 1953)

Sutham Sangprathum (Thai: สุธรรม แสงประทุม, RTGS: Sutham Saengprathum; born October 26, 1953) is a Thai politician of the Thai Rak Thai Party. He was deputy minister of the Ministry of Interior from 2004 to 2005.

He received a BA in Law at Chulalongkorn University and an MBA at Kasetsart University. Before becoming Deputy Interior Minister, he was the Minister of University Affairs of Thailand and Vice President of the National Assembly of Thailand.
