= William L. Monson =

American television executive (died 2020)

William L. Monson was an American businessman.

== Biography ==
Monson started Clearview TV Cable in 1963. He was a true pioneer in the cable TV industry and began at the early age of 18. He built multiple successful TV systems in the 1960s and 1970s. He founded Good News Media Centers to “give back” to the Christian community. He sold Clearview in the early 1980s to Group Westinghouse (which is now known as Comcast). He founded Clearview International with global headquarters in Honolulu, HI. Monson built the cable system on Hickam Air Force Base in Hawaii. He was the first civilian contractor to build a cable system on any US military base. He developed the first portable transport satellite system that was utilized in Australia, New Zealand and Thailand. Working with MCOT (Ministry of Telecommunication in Thailand), he started the first American TV system in Thailand.

In the 1980s, Monson was involved in the establishment of Video Link, a Thai cable television joint-venture between Clearview and Thaksin Shinawatra's Shinawatra Computer and Communications (today known as Shin Corporation) and International Broadcasting Company (IBC, today known as "United Broadcasting Corporation").

Monson who was a foreigner, needed local representation to launch cable television in Thailand. Shinawatra was a police officer whom befriended Monson and they then entered into a business deal creating what is now known as IBC.

Trust was broken between Shinawatra and Monson. Shinawatra took over the company and ousted Monson of all profit. Monson was accused by Shinawatra of stealing cable supplies when in fact Monson has shipped all the equipment from the United States. Monson won the case in the Thai Supreme court and charges against Monson were dropped.

Monson engaged in a series of controversial court cases against Thaksin, who by that time had become "Prime Minister of Thailand", during the height of the "2005–06 Thai political crisis".
The case was lost due to statute of limitations.

== Files breach of contract charges ==
In 1995, he and four other plaintiffs filed breach of contract charges against Thaksin and 16 other defendants, the plaintiffs demanding 4.13 billion baht in compensation. In 2002, a court threw out the breach of contract charges after finding that the contract between Monson and Thaksin had never taken effect. The court ruled that the contract between Monson and CTVC of Hawaii (USA), on one side, and Thaksin, his wife, and Shinawatra Computer, on the other side, to set up Video Link Co Ltd was void from the beginning; Monson's resignation from Video Link's board of directors voided the contract. The court ordered Monson and the plaintiffs to pay nearly 2 million baht in lawyers' fees for the defendants.

== Files perjury charges ==
Monson also filed a lawsuit claiming that Thaksin lied to a civil court during a trial on July 22, 1996, and demanded 6 billion baht in compensation. In September 2006, the court ruled that Monson had failed to bring Thaksin to court within the statute of limitations after filing the lawsuit. Monson defended his case by noting that "We never got to argue or look at the facts of the case. We lost this round based on a legal technicality." A second charge of perjury against Thaksin was also dismissed. Both cases are on appeal. Monson has won a civil case over ownership of equipment in two lower courts and are awaiting a Supreme Court decision following resolution of the criminal charges against Thaksin et al.

In addition Monson has filed a complaint with the Special Investigator looking into contracts involving MCOT and IBC.

== Bank of Thailand conflict ==
In February 2007, Thaksin's wife requested that the Bank of Thailand allow her to transfer 400 million baht to the United Kingdom so that she could purchase a house. The central bank originally had no objection to the transfer, until Monson sent a letter to the central bank Governor. He claimed that the money transfer would jeopardise his legal cases against Thaksin, and threatened to hold the bank responsible for any damages he might incur. The Bank of Thailand then agreed to not permit the transfer.

== Personal life ==
William Lyle Monson was born January 5, 1943, in St. Paul, Minnesota. Monson graduated high school in Renton, Washington, and attended Washington State University. Monson was married twice and has eight children and 15 grandchildren. William L. Monson died November 24, 2020.

== See also ==
- Thaksin Shinawatra
