= 2001 Thai general election =

- 6 January 2001

All 500 seats in the House of Representatives 251 seats needed for a majority
- Registered: 42,875,036
- Turnout: 69.43% (▲7.01pp)

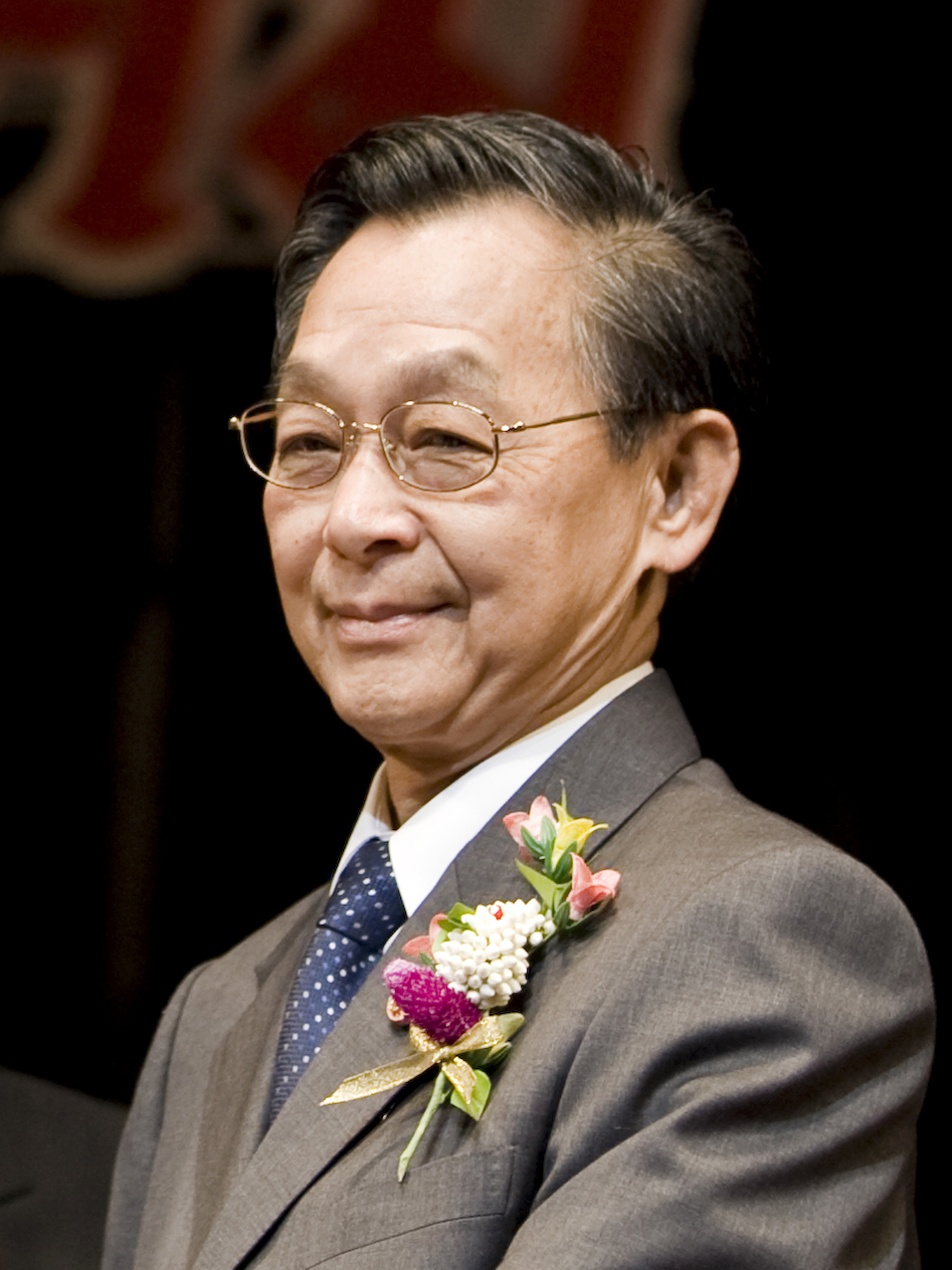

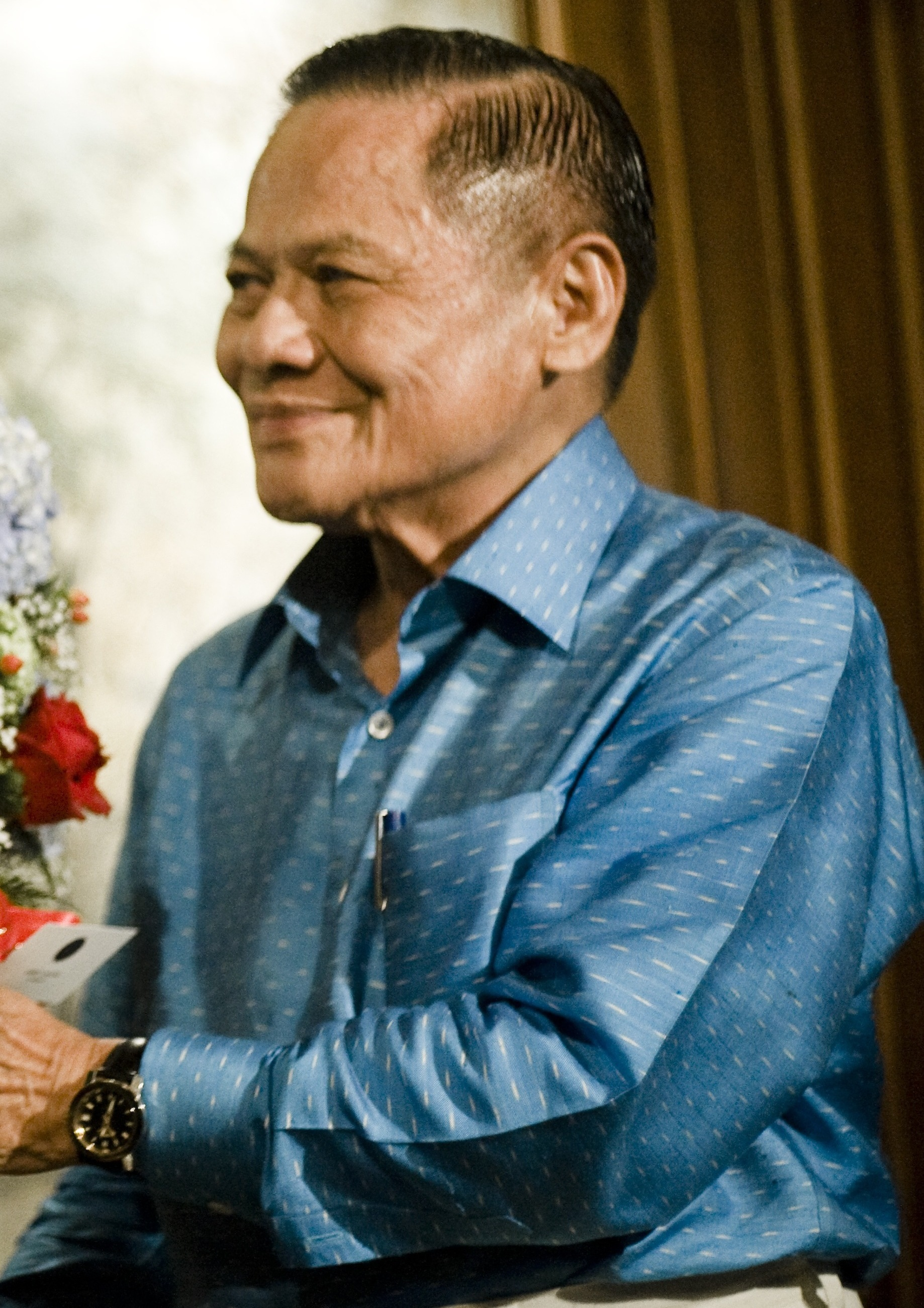

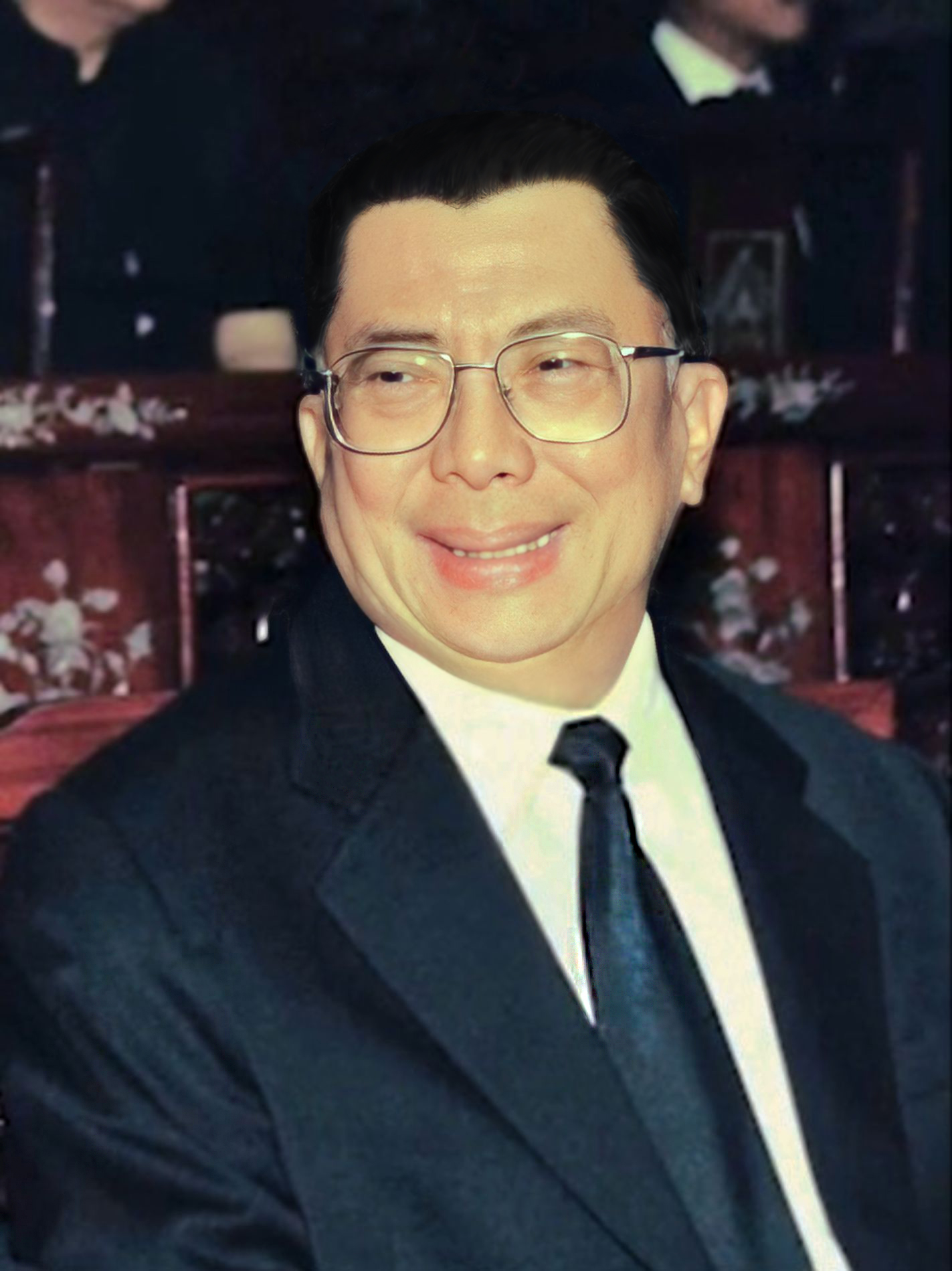

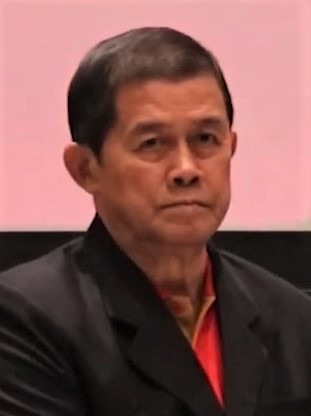
	First party	Second party	Third party
Leader	Thaksin Shinawatra	Chuan Leekpai	Banharn Silpa-archa
Party	Thai Rak Thai	Democrat	Chart Thai
Last election	-	31.78%, 123 seats	9.88% 39 seats
Seats won	248	128	41
Seat change	New	▲5	▲2
Constituency vote	9,616,204	6,721,220	2,223,320
% and swing	35.68% (New)	24.94% (▼6.84pp)	8.25% (▼1.63pp)
Party-list vote	11,565,103	7,494,738	1,516,192
% and swing	39.91% (New)	25.86% (New)	5.23% (New)
	Fourth party	Fifth party
Leader	Chavalit Yongchaiyudh	Korn Dabbaransi
Party	New Aspiration	National Development
Last election	29.14%, 125 seats	12.38%, 52 seats
Seats won	36	29
Seat change	▼89	▼23
Constituency vote	2,433,892	2,307,281
% and swing	9.03% (▼20.11pp)	8.56% (▼3.82pp)
Party-list vote	1,996,227	1,752,981
% and swing	6.89% (New)	6.05% (New)
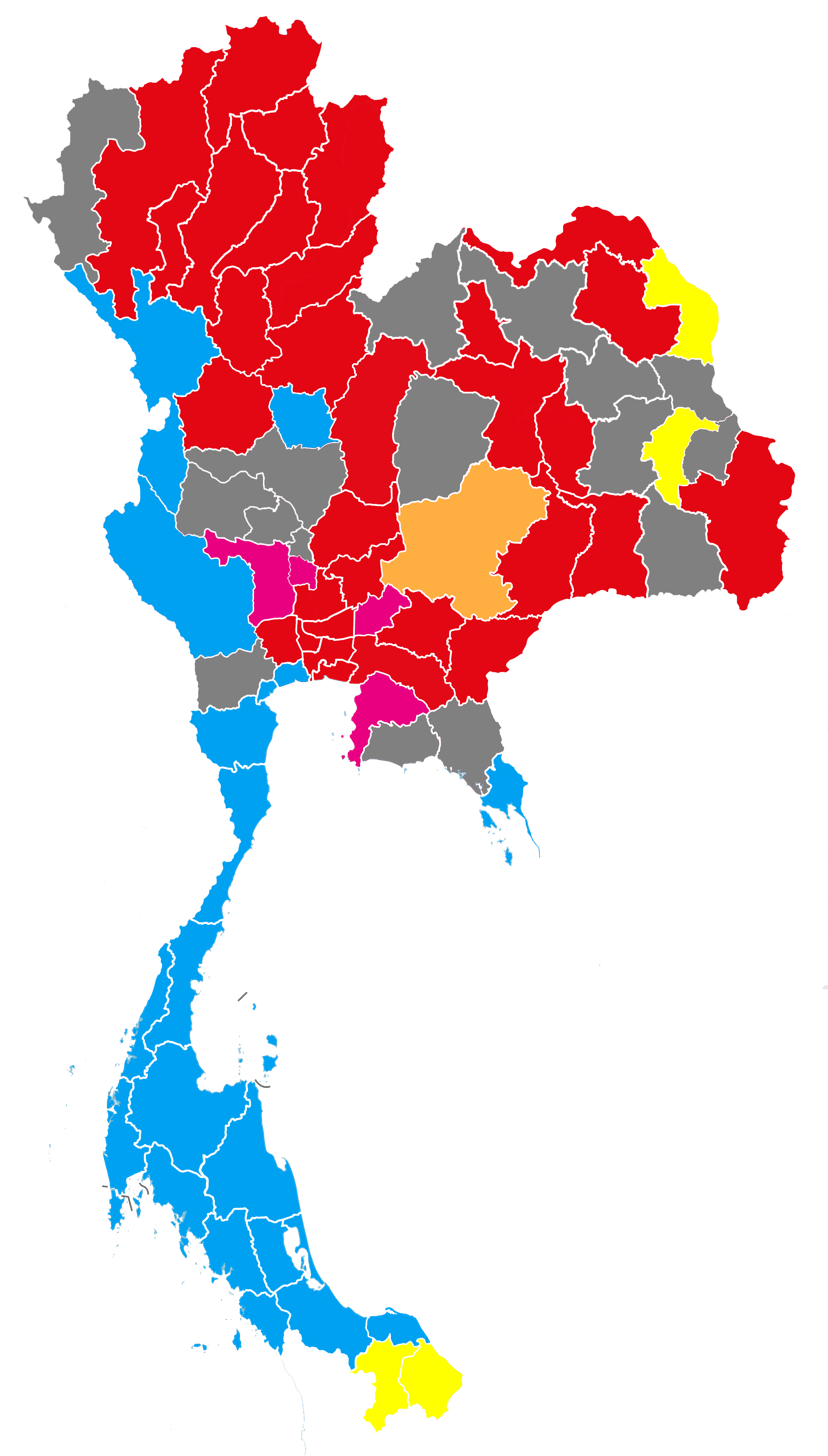
- Parties that won a majority of the seats in each province: Thai Rak Thai; Democrat; Chart Thai; New Aspiration; National Development; No majority
Prime Minister before election
Chuan Leekpai
Democrat
Prime Minister-designate
Thaksin Shinawatra
Thai Rak Thai

General elections were held in Thailand on 6 January 2001 to elect the 500 seats of the House of Representatives. In accordance with the recently enacted 1997 constitution, the House of Representatives was composed of 400 members elected from single-member constituencies and 100 elected from national party lists on a proportional basis.

The Thai Rak Thai party co-founded and led by Thaksin Shinawatra received the most votes and won 248 of the 500 seats on a populist platform of economic growth and anti-corruption. Following the elections, it gained a parliamentary majority by merging with the New Aspiration Party, giving it 286 seats. A coalition government was formed with the Thai Nation Party. The Democrat Party, which had run on a platform supporting neoliberal, IMF-backed economic reforms, went into the opposition with the National Development Party.

== Opinion polls ==
=== Preferred party ===
Date(s) conducted	Polling organisation/client	Sample size	TRT	Democrat	NDP	NAP	TN	Other	Lead		
Date(s) conducted	Polling organisation/client	Sample size	10 September - 30 October 2000	Suan Dusit	91,856	42.76	34.02	7.71	5.63	5.19	4.69

=== Preferred prime minister ===
Date(s) conducted	Polling organisation/client	Sample size	Taksin	Chuan	Chavalit	Korn	Banharn	Other	Lead
10 September - 30 October 2000	Suan Dusit	91,856	44.18	34.53	5.07	7.52	4.52	4.18	

=== Government approval ===
Fieldwork date(s)	Polling firm	Sample size	Approve	Disapprove	Neither	Others	Net approval
18 December 1999	Suan Dusit	3,394	70.81	28.11	-	1.08	

== Results ==
Party	Party-list			Constituency			Total seats
Party	Votes	%	Seats	Votes	%	Seats	Total seats
Thai Rak Thai	11,565,103	39.91	48	9,616,204	35.68	200	248
Democrat Party	7,494,738	25.86	31	6,721,220	24.94	97	128
New Aspiration Party	1,996,227	6.89	8	2,433,892	9.03	28	36
National Development Party	1,752,981	6.05	7	2,307,281	8.56	22	29
Thai Nation Party	1,516,192	5.23	6	2,223,320	8.25	35	41
Seritham Party	821,736	2.84	0	1,029,940	3.82	14	14
Thai Motherland Party	606,679	2.09	0	278,384	1.03	1	1
People's Party	358,127	1.24	0	849,724	3.15	2	2
Thai Citizen Party	339,199	1.17	0	366,952	1.36	0	0
Thai Democracy Party	198,233	0.68	0	347	0.00	0	0
National Democratic Party	196,351	0.68	0	935	0.00	0	0
Amnat Pracachon	147,957	0.51	0	2,013	0.01	0	0
Thai Chuai Thai	129,769	0.45	0				0
Niti Mahachon	120,920	0.42	0				0
Rak Samakhi	119,007	0.41	0	1,562	0.01	0	0
Seri Prachathipattai	107,488	0.37	0	12,613	0.05	0	0
Kaset Mahachon	73,270	0.25	0	40,889	0.15	0	0
Sayam	73,120	0.25	0	290	0.00	0	0
Palang Dharma Party	68,662	0.24	0	5,724	0.02	0	0
Sangkhom Mai	67,587	0.23	0	3,874	0.01	0	0
People's Power Party	63,701	0.22	0	4,177	0.02	0	0
Palang Kasetrakorn	57,937	0.20	0	634	0.00	0	0
Thai Party	57,200	0.20	0	817	0.00	0	0
Kasikorn Thai	55,282	0.19	0				0
Phantana Sangkhom	48,852	0.17	0				0
Chiwit Thi Dikwa	45,887	0.16	0				0
Chao Thai	45,663	0.16	0	1,013	0.00	0	0
Social Action Party	45,089	0.16	0	21,641	0.08	1	1
Chaona Pattana Prathet	44,971	0.16	0	1,014	0.00	0	0
Sangkhom Prachathipattai	34,793	0.12	0	725	0.00	0	0
Kao Na	31,365	0.11	0	961	0.00	0	0
Thai Maharat	31,261	0.11	0	10,112	0.04	0	0
Santiphap	29,432	0.10	0	1,308	0.00	0	0
Raengngan Thai	28,980	0.10	0				0
Satha Prachahon	25,687	0.09	0	3,411	0.01	0	0
Phao Thai	19,672	0.07	0	150	0.00	0	0
Withi Thai	12,880	0.04	0	646	0.00	0	0
Solidarity Party				1,793	0.01	0	0
Labour Party				361	0.00	0	0
Thai Mankhong				197	0.00	0	0
Chao Rai				111	0.00	0	0
Seri Thai				51	0.00	0	0
Thai Thammathipattai				27	0.00	0	0
Blank votes	544,731	1.88	–	1,010,236	3.75	–	–
Total	28,976,729	100.00	100	26,954,549	100.00	400	500
Valid votes	28,976,729	97.35		26,954,549	90.03		
Invalid votes	789,950	2.65		2,984,784	9.97		
Total votes	29,766,679	100.00		29,939,333	100.00		
Registered voters/turnout	42,875,036	69.43		42,825,018	69.91		
Source: Nelson

=== Elected members ===
==== Nationwide constituency ====
#	Name	Party
1	Thaksin Shinawatra	Thai Rak Thai (48 seats)
2	Purachai Piemsomboon	Thai Rak Thai (48 seats)
3	Somkid Chatusripitak	Thai Rak Thai (48 seats)
4	Uthai Pimchaichon	Thai Rak Thai (48 seats)
5	Adisai Potharamik	Thai Rak Thai (48 seats)
6	Sudarat Keyuraphan	Thai Rak Thai (48 seats)
7	Suvit Khunkitti	Thai Rak Thai (48 seats)
8	Pitak Intharawitthayanan	Thai Rak Thai (48 seats)
9	Pongpol Adireksarn	Thai Rak Thai (48 seats)
10	Pracha Maleenond	Thai Rak Thai (48 seats)
11	Surakiart Sathirathai	Thai Rak Thai (48 seats)
12	Suriya Jungrungreangkit	Thai Rak Thai (48 seats)
13	Sora-ath Klinprathum	Thai Rak Thai (48 seats)
14	Chamlong Krutkhunthod	Thai Rak Thai (48 seats)
15	Chaturon Chaisang	Thai Rak Thai (48 seats)
16	General Yuthasak Sasiprapha	Thai Rak Thai (48 seats)
17	General Chettha Thanajaro	Thai Rak Thai (48 seats)
18	Sanoh Thienthong	Thai Rak Thai (48 seats)
19	General Thammarak Issarangkul na Ayuthaya	Thai Rak Thai (48 seats)
20	Sutham Saengprathum	Thai Rak Thai (48 seats)
21	Somsak Thepsuthin	Thai Rak Thai (48 seats)
22	Pongthep Thepkachana	Thai Rak Thai (48 seats)
23	Polkit Hongthong	Thai Rak Thai (48 seats)
24	Boonchu Trithong	Thai Rak Thai (48 seats)
25	Pramuan Ruchanaseri	Thai Rak Thai (48 seats)
26	Chaiyos Sasomsap	Thai Rak Thai (48 seats)
27	Prayuth Mahakitsiri	Thai Rak Thai (48 seats)
28	Warathep Rattanakorn	Thai Rak Thai (48 seats)
29	Laddawan Wongsriwong	Thai Rak Thai (48 seats)
30	Adisorn Piengket	Thai Rak Thai (48 seats)
31	Preecha Laohapongchai	Thai Rak Thai (48 seats)
32	Vichet Kasemthongsri	Thai Rak Thai (48 seats)
33	Piyanat Watcharaporn	Thai Rak Thai (48 seats)
34	Captain Suchart Chaovisith	Thai Rak Thai (48 seats)
35	Ravee Hiranchote	Thai Rak Thai (48 seats)
36	Charinrat Putthapuan	Thai Rak Thai (48 seats)
37	Sukhum Laowansiri	Thai Rak Thai (48 seats)
38	Viset Jaiyai	Thai Rak Thai (48 seats)
39	Sermsak Karun	Thai Rak Thai (48 seats)
40	Phumin Leethiratprasert	Thai Rak Thai (48 seats)
41	Phicharn Pibulvatthanawong	Thai Rak Thai (48 seats)
42	Pornsak Charoenprasert	Thai Rak Thai (48 seats)
43	Chusak Aekthong	Thai Rak Thai (48 seats)
44	Vivatthanachai na Kalasin	Thai Rak Thai (48 seats)
45	Suthin Klangsaeng	Thai Rak Thai (48 seats)
46	Surachai Baojanya	Thai Rak Thai (48 seats)
47	Yuthasil Thapanakul	Thai Rak Thai (48 seats)
48	Veerachai Veerametheekul	Thai Rak Thai (48 seats)
49	Chuan Leekpai	Democrats: 31 seats
50	Banyat Bantadtan	Democrats: 31 seats
51	Abhisit Vejjajiva	Democrats: 31 seats
52	Therdpong Chaiyanand	Democrats: 31 seats
53	Arthit Ourairat	Democrats: 31 seats
54	Tarrin Nimmanahaeminda	Democrats: 31 seats
55	Suthep Thaugsuban	Democrats: 31 seats
56	Suthas Ngernmuen	Democrats: 31 seats
57	Trairong Suwankiri	Democrats: 31 seats
58	Anant Anantrakul	Democrats: 31 seats
59	Ekkamol Kiriwat	Democrats: 31 seats
60	Marut Bunnag	Democrats: 31 seats
61	Vijit Srisa-an	Democrats: 31 seats
62	Mahidol Chantharangkul	Democrats: 31 seats
63	Police Lieutenant General Wannarat Kotcharat	Democrats: 31 seats
64	Jurin Laksanavisit	Democrats: 31 seats
65	Nibhon Promphan	Democrats: 31 seats
66	Kobsak Sabavasu	Democrats: 31 seats
67	Kalaya Sophonpanich	Democrats: 31 seats
68	Surin Pitsuwan	Democrats: 31 seats
69	Paitoon Kaewthong	Democrats: 31 seats
70	Arkapol Sorasuchart	Democrats: 31 seats
71	Samphan Thongsamak	Democrats: 31 seats
72	Sathit Wongnongtoey	Democrats: 31 seats
73	Anchalee Theppabutr	Democrats: 31 seats
74	Pornsek Kanchanacharee	Democrats: 31 seats
75	Phothipong Lamsam	Democrats: 31 seats
76	Savit Bhodivihok	Democrats: 31 seats
77	Anek Laothamthat	Democrats: 31 seats
78	Pornvuth Sarasin	Democrats: 31 seats
79	Sansern Samalapa	Democrats: 31 seats
80	General Chavalit Yongchaiyudh	New Aspiration: 8 seats
81	Wan Muhammad Nor Matha	New Aspiration: 8 seats
82	Sukavich Rangsitpol	New Aspiration: 8 seats
83	Police captain Chalerm Yubamrung	New Aspiration: 8 seats
84	Chingchai Mongkoltham	New Aspiration: 8 seats
85	Dr Nimit Nonthaphanthavast	New Aspiration: 8 seats
86	Pichet Sathirachaval	New Aspiration: 8 seats
87	Sulaimal Wongpanich	New Aspiration: 8 seats
88	Korn Dabbaransi	Chart Pattana: 7 seats
89	Suwat Liptapanlop	Chart Pattana: 7 seats
90	Police General Pracha Promnok	Chart Pattana: 7 seats
91	Pavena Hongsakula	Chart Pattana: 7 seats
92	Colonel Vinai Sompong	Chart Pattana: 7 seats
93	Goanpot Asavinvijit	Chart Pattana: 7 seats
94	Prapass Limpaphan	Chart Pattana: 7 seats
95	Mom Rajawongse Kasemsamosorn Kasemsri	Chart Thai: 6 seats
96	General Viroj Saengsanit	Chart Thai: 6 seats
97	Dej Boonlong	Chart Thai: 6 seats
98	Sonthaya Khunpluem	Chart Thai: 6 seats
99	Kobsak Chutikul	Chart Thai: 6 seats
100	Janistar Liewchalermwong	Chart Thai: 6 seats
Source: Bangkok Post

==== Single-member constituencies ====
Bangkok: 37 Seats

1. Siri Wangboonkerd (TRT)24,557
2. Krisada Sajjakul (TRT)25,089
3. Lalita Rirksamran (TRT)27,822
4. Kannikar Thammakesorn (TRT) 21,416
5. Prachuab Ungpakorn (TRT) 19,749
6. Mom Rajawongse Sukhumbhand Paribatra (Dem) 30,582
7. Charoen Kanthawaong (Dem) 26,978
8. Somkiat Chanthavanich (Dem) 21,450
9. Sitha Thivaree (TRT) 22,215
10. Issara Soonthornwat (Dem) 23,244
11. Piraphan Salirathawipak (Dem) 30,466
12. Chalermchai Jinawijarana (TRT) 34,857
13. Suppamas Isarapakdi (TRT) 23,577
14. Mom Rajawongse Damrongdis Disakul (TRT) 27,246
15. Ruaylarp Iamthong (TRT) 22,541
16. Anusorn Panthong (TRT) 33,780
17. Pramont Kunakasem (TRT) 24,512
18. Puwanida Khunpalin (TRT) 23,007
19. Pimol Srivikorn (TRT) 33,247
20. Re-election
21. Tawatchai Sajjakul (TRT) 32,518
22. Pattrasak Osathanukhroh (TRT) 29,760
23. Sansanee Narkpong (TRT) 28,453
24. Wattana Sengpairoh (TRT) 21,539
25. Mongkol Kimsoonchan (TRT) 39,656
26. Vicharn Minchainant (TRT) 43,274
27. Anek Hutangkabadi (TRT) 28,572
28. Pramote Sukhum (Dem) 21,944
29. Phimuk Simaroj (TRT) 29,100
30. Ong-art Klampaibul (Dem) 23,987
31. Pitipong Temcharoen (TRT) 30,927
32. Vilas Chanthapitak (Dem) 30,321
33. Suwat Muangsiri (TRT) 32,357
34. Suwat Wannasirikul (TRT) 34,615
35. Sakol Muangsiri (TRT) 40,000
36. Sutha Chanseang (TRT) 25,314
37. Sawaeng Rirkcharun (TRT) 35,654

North: 16 provinces, 76 seats

Chiang Mai (10 MPs)

1. Pakorn Buranapakorn (TRT) 33,605
2. Yaowapa Wongsawat (TRT) 45,981
3. Boonsong Teriyapirom (TRT) 29,542
4. Re-election
5. Pornchai Atthapiyangkul (TRT) 39,521
6. Noppakul Rathpathai (TRT) 49,728
7. Surapol Kiatchaiyakorn (TRT) 45,289
8. Panintra Pakkasem (TRT) 21,760
9. Yongyuth Suwaparp (Dem) 22,193
10. Santi Tansuhat (TRT) 29,981

Chiang Rai (8 MPs)

1. Samart Kaewmechai (TRT) 39,944
2. Sarit Ung-apinan (TRT) 51,621
3. Thavon Triratnarong. (TRT) 26,091
4. Visan Techateerawat (TRT) 32,393
5. Re-election
6. Yongyuth Tiyapairat (TRT) 30,927
7. Ittidej Kaewluang (TRT) 34,713
8. Buasorn Prachamon (TRT) 39,321

Kamphaeng Phet (5 MPs)

1. Preecha Musikul (Dem) 31,911
2. Kaneung Thaiprasit (TRT) 25,561
3. Weipoj Arpornrat (TRT) 26,662
4. Sanan Sabaimuang (TRT) 26,484
5. Thawil Rirkrai (TRT) 26,640

Lampang (5 MPs)

1. Piroj Lohsunthorn (TRT) 41,309
2. Chinda Wongsawat (TRT) 51,975
3. Re-election
4. Pinit Chanthasurin (TRT) 47,639
5. Re-election

Lamphun (3 MPs)

1. Apaporn Putthapuan (TRT) 32,402
2. Sa-nguan Pongmanee (TRT) 31,796
3. Songchai Wongsawat (Dem) 32,964

Mae Hong Son (2 MPs)

1. Panya Jinakham (Dem) 14,276
2. Somboon Praiwan (TRT) 16,397

Nakhon Sawan (7 MPs)

1. Pinyo Niroj (CTP) 32,012
2. Kasem Pan-udomlak (Dem) 34,184
3. Somkuan Oborm (CTP) 29,619
4. Sanchai Wongsunthorn (TRT) 31,117
5. Maytri Chartjindarat (TRT) 35,230
6. Banyin Tangpakorn (TRT) 24,252
7. Niroj Sunthornlekha (CTP) 22,073

Nan (3 MPs)

1. Khamron na Lamphun (Dem) 37,631
2. Cholanan Srikaew (TRT) 38,146
3. Wallop Supeeyasil (TRT) 22,647

Phayao (3 MPs)

1. Arunee Chamnanya (TRT) 26,924
2. Wisut Chainarun (TRT) 47,386
3. Kriangkrai Chaiyamonkol (TRT) 29,298

Phetchabun (7 MPs)

1. Re-election
2. Surasak Anakaphan (TRT) 33,023
3. Thaweesak Anakaphan (TRT) 26,706
4. Narongkorn Chawansantati (TRT) 21,428
5. Kitthikun Nakhabutr (TRT) 22,567
6. Kaew Buasuwan (NAP) 31,308
7. Paisal Chantarapakdee (TRT) 31,921

Phitsanulok Province (6 MPs)

1. Pitak Santiwongdecha (Dem) 25,975
2. Pisanu Polawei (TRT) 27,946
3. Mayura Manasikarn (TRT) 28,028
4. Suchon Champhunoj (TRT) 26,396
5. Nakorn Machim (Dem) 14,337
6. Veera Patamasiriwat (TRT) 29,397

Phrae (3 MPs)

1. Tosaporn Sereerak (TRT) 59,174
2. Siriwan Prassachaksatru (Dem) 50,010
3. Worawat Uea-apinyakul (TRT) 42,007

Phichit (4 MPs)

1. Pradit Pataraprasit (Dem) 40,846
2. Re-election
3. Siriwat Kachornprasart (Dem) 30,953
4. Adul Boonset (TRT) 47,134

Sukhothai (4 MPs)

1. Anongwan Thepsutin (TRT) 37,707
2. Re-election
3. Somchet Limpraphan (CPP) 31,468
4. Re-election

Tak (3 MPs)

1. Thanon Tantisunthorn (Dem) 37,640
2. Chaiwuth Bannawat (Dem) 37,936
3. Thanitphon Chaiyanant (Dem) 25,814

Uttaradit (3 MPs)

1. Kritsana Srihalak (TRT) 37,570
2. Re-election
3. Thanusak Lek-utai (TRT) 40,571

Central: 26 provinces, 95 seats

Ang Thong (2 MPs)

1. Viroj Pao-in (CTP) 31,065
2. Somsak Prisanananthakul (CTP) 43,765

Ayutthaya (5 MPs)

1. Kuakul Danchaivijit (TRT) 36,138
2. Pong Chiwanant (TRT) 39,476
3. Suvimol Phancharoenvorakul (TRT) 49,084
4. Withaya Buranasiri (TRT) 31,023
5. Boonphan Kaewattana (TRT) 25,703

Chachoengsao (4 MPs)

1. Anant Chaisaeng (TRT) 39,531
2. Itthi Sirilathayakorn (CPP) 34,879
3. Suchart Tancharoen (NAP) 24,324
4. Wuthipong Chaisaeng (TRT) 41,807

Chai Nat (2 MPs)

1. Anucha Nakasai (TRT) 36,533
2. Monthien Songpracha (CTP) 50,649

Chanthaburi (3 MPs)

1. Thawatchai Anampong (CPP) 37,731
2. Komkai Polabut (Dem) 41,258
3. Pongvej Vejjajiva.(TRT) 33,593

Chon Buri (7 MPs)

1. Sa-nga Thanasanguanwong (CTP) 36,823
2. Vidthaya Khunpluem (CTP) 31,866
3. Somchai Sahachairungrueng (CTP) 28,812
4. Surasit Nitiwutvoraluck (CTP) 29,906
5. Itthipol Khunpluem (CTP) 35,564
6. Charnsak Chavalitnititham (CTP) 25,607
7. Roj Wiphatpumiprathet (TRT) 23,042

Kanchanaburi (5 MPs)

1. Re-election
2. Santhad Jinapak (TRT) 35,824
3. Re-election
4. Re-election
5. Re-election

Lop Buri (5 MPs)

1. Natthapol Kiatvinaisakul (TRT) 31,521
2. Pongsak Vorapanya (TRT) 28,836
3. Kamol Chirapanwanich (CTP) 26,753
4. Amnuay Klangpa (TRT) 49,692
5. Niyom Vorapanya (TRT) 30,189

Nakhon Nayok (2 MPs)

1. Re-election
2. Re-election

Nakhon Pathom (5 MPs)

1. Prasan Boonmee (TRT) 29,254
2. Charnchai Pathummarak (TRT) 32,290
3. Pornsak Piemkla (TRT) 40,501
4. Chaiya Sasomsap (TRT) 30,276
5. Padermchai Sasomsap (TRT) 25,061

Nonthaburi (5 MPs)

1. Udomdej Ratanasathien (TRT) 29,221
2. Nithat Srinond (TRT) 28,650
3. Pimpa Chanprasong (TRT) 36,002
4. Apiwan Viriyachai (TRT) 43,656
5. Suchart Bandasak (TRT) 38,202

Pathum Thani (4 MPs)

1. Surapong Ungampornvilai (CPP) 36,404
2. Ekapote Panyaem (Dem) 45,919
3. Sumet Ritthakanee (TRT) 29,564
4. Likit Moodee (TRT) 33,546

Phetchaburi (3 MPs)

1. Alongkorn Polbutr (Dem) 52,006
2. Thani Yisarn (TRT) 47,595
3. Apichart Supapaeng (Dem) 39,951

Prachuab Khiri Khan (3 MPs)

1. Montri Pannoinon (Dem) 38,951
2. Chalermchai Sri-on (Dem) 38,790
3. Payao Pultharat (Dem) 39,907

Prachin Buri (3 MPs)

1. Sunthorn Vilawan (TRT) 37,313
2. Re-election
3. Woravut Pumakanchana (TRT) 37,959

Ratchaburi (5 MPs)

1. Re-election
2. Vivat Nitikanchana (TRT) 40,233
3. Prapaiphan Sengprasert (Dem) 38,600
4. Vijai Wattanaprasit (Dem) 32,024
5. Boonlue Prasertsopha (TRT) 37,296

Rayong (3 MPs)

1. Sathit Pitutaycha (Dem) 39,184
2. Sin Khumpha (TRT) 28,476
3. Piya Pitutaycha (CTP) 25,360

Sa Kaew (3 MPs)

1. Thanit Thienthong (TRT) 55,333
2. Trinut Thienthong (TRT) 58,953
3. Vitthaya Thienthong (TRT) 52,603

Samut Prakan (6 MPs)

1. Wallop Yangtrong (TRT) 27,859
2. Prasert Denapalai (TRT) 31,968
3. Pracha Prasobdee (TRT) 26,610
4. Chiraphan Limsakulsirirat (TRT) 26,453
5. Salinthip Chaisadom (TRT) 27,833
6. Re-election

Samut Songkhram (1 MP)

1. Rangsima Rodrasmee (Dem) 51,868

Samut Sakhon (3 MPs)

1. Anek Thapsuwan (Dem) 23,679
2. Sutham Rahong (Dem) 20,186
3. Udom Kraiwatnussorn (NAP) 27,594

Saraburi (4 MPs)

1. Ngern Boonsupa (TRT) 23,964
2. Yongyos Adireksarn (TRT) 21,995
3. Somchai Sunthornwat (TRT) 39,067
4. Veerapol Adireksarn (TRT) 41,999

Sing Buri (2 MP)

1. Chaiwut Thanakananusorn (Dem) 30,245
2. Payap Panket (TRT) 23,335

Suphan Buri (6 MPs)

1. Varawut Silpa-archa (CTP) 49,930
2. Kanchana Silpa-archa (CTP) 52,422
3. Natthawut Prasertsuwan (CTP) 49,575
4. Banharn Silpa-archa (CTP) 49,816
5. Prapat Pothasuthon (CTP) 52,545
6. Jongchai Thiengtham (CTP) 43,484

Trat (2 MP)

1. Boonsong Kaiket (Dem) 19,736
2. Thira Salakpet (Dem) 28,870

Uthai Thani (2 MPs)

1. Thiraphan Veerayutwattana (CTP) 33,358
2. Noppadol Polsen (CTP) 28,902

Northeast: 19 provinces, 138 seats

Amnat Charoen (2 MPs)

1. Thirachai Sirikhan (NAP) 27,545
2. Paisal Chanthawara (Dem) 26,162

Buri Ram (10 MPs)

1. Re-election
2. Karuna Chidchob (CTP) 33,813
3. Saksayam Chidchob (CTP) 31,508
4. Surasak Nakdee (TRT)24,965
5. Re-election
6. Sophon Saran (CTP) 23,027
7. Prakit Poladej (TRT) 35,407
8. & 9) Re-election
9. Songsak Thongsri(TRT) 37,944

Chaiyaphum (7 MPs)

1. Re-election
2. Chavalit Mahachan (TRT) 30,661
3. Kamsueng Prapakornkaewrat (TRT) 33,594
4. Wuthichai Sa-nguanwongchai (CPP) 38,557
5. Re-election
6. Charoen Chankomol (TRT) 40,052
7. Surawit Khonsomboon (Seritham) 30,776

Kalasin (6 MPs)

1. Sukhumpong Ngonkham (TRT) 25,432
2. Orradi Suthasri (CTP) 33,590
3. Vidthaya Phumlaochaeng (TRT) 37,378
4. Pirapet Sirikul (NAP) 19,702
5. Boonruen Sritharet (TRT) 27,852
6. Prasert Boonrueng (NAP) 33,260

Khon Kaen (11 MPs)

1. Charkrin Patdamrongkij (TRT) 30,742
2. Prachak Kaewklaharn (TRT) 29,721
3. Natronglert Surapol (SAP) 19,966
4. Re-election
5. Phum Sarapol (TRT) 29,721
6. Re-election
7. Suchai Srisurapol (TRT) 11,799
8. Somsak Khun-ngern (Seritham) 26,334
9. Re-election
10. Re-election
11. Premsak Piayura (NAP)31,751

Loei (4 MPs)

1. Tossaphon Sangkasub (TRT) 43,180
2. Thanapol Timsuwan (TRT) 37,802
3. Re-election
4. Suvit Yothongyos (Seritham) 16,100

Maha Sarakham (6 MPs)

1. Thonglor Polkote (TRT) 51,597
2. Chaiwat Tinrat (TRT) 31,593
3. Yuthapong Charassathien (Dem) 32,255
4. Charnchai Chairungrueng (TRT) 31,156
5. Kusumawadee Sirikomut (TRT) 29,864
6. Re-election

Mukdahan (2 MPs)

1. Pramualsin Pokesawat (Seritham) 21,812
2. Lawan Tantikulpong (TRT) 26,919

Nakhon Phanom (5 MPs)

1. Re-election
2. Re-election
3. Mongkol Buppasiri (NAP) 22,238
4. Re-election
5. Suphachai Phosu (NAP) 38,939

Nakhon Ratchasima (17 MPs)

1. Tewan Liptapanlop (CPP)
2. Wannarat Charnnukul (CPP) 47,211
3. Pravit Rattanapien (CPP) 46,320
4. Prateep Kreethavej (CPP) 35,099
5. Pitsinee Mungfakklang (TRT) 23,940
6. & 7) Re-election
7. Pairoj Suwanchawee (TRT) 37,841
8. & 10) Re-election
9. Somsak Phankasem (CPP) 53,142
10. Somchai Pretprasert (TRT) 34,480
11. Prasert Chanruangthong (TRT) 33,647
12. & 15) Re-election

16) Somsak Somklang (CPP) 25,985 17) Re-election

Nong Bua Lam Phu (3 MPs)

1. Kittisak Hatthasongkroh (TRT) 19,570
2. Re-election
3. Vichai Samit (TRT) 36,189

Nong Khai (6 MPs)

1. Pongpan Sunthornchai (TRT) 29,525
2. Prasit Chanthathong (TRT) 33,276
3. Ekthanut Inrod (TRT) 20,570
4. Tewarit Nikornthep (TRT) 22,312
5. Re-election
6. Niphon Konekayan (TRT) 21,929

Roi-et (9 MPs)

1. Sanit Wongsaktanapong (Seritham) 34,514
2. & 3) Re-election
3. Ekaparp Polsue (Seritham) 29,821
4. Nirand Namuangrak (TRT) 27,035
5. Nisit Sinthupai (NAP) 23,847
6. Kitti Somsap (TRT) 34,007
7. Sakda Kongpet (TRT) 46,332
8. Re-election

Sakon Nakhon (7 MPs)

1. Re-election
2. Chalermchai Urankul (NAP) 28,851
3. Narisorn Thongtiras (CTP) 19,494
4. Sakhon Prompakdi (Seritham) 24,189
5. Pongsak Boonsol (TRT) 25,917
6. Seri Saranant (TRT) 30,376
7. Kasem Utara (NAP) 21,566

Si Sa Ket (9 MPs)

1. Boonchong Veesommai (NAP) 22,701
2. Pitthaya Boonchaleo (NAP) 21,148
3. Wiwatchai Hotarawaisaya (CTP) 24,608
4. Chaturong Pengnoraphat (TRT) 39,347
5. Danairit Watcharaporn (TRT) 24,820
6. Tin Wongplang (CTP) 23,437
7. Re-election
8. Manop Charasdamrongnit (TRT) 37,354
9. Re-election

Surin (9 MPs)

1. Chuchai Mungcharoenporn (TRT) 30,502
2. Thirachote Kongthong (CTP) 23,847
3. Farida Sulaiman (TRT) 23,217
4. Re-election
5. Pradut Manmai (TRT) 16,484
6. Supalak Kuanha (TRT) 36,593
7. Re-election
8. Seksan Saenphum (TRT) 25,985
9. Teeyai Phoonsritanakul (TRT) 28,638

Udon Thani (10 MPs)

1. Sarawut Petpanomporn (CPP) 18,648
2. Atthapol Sanitwongchai (TRT) 23,518
3. Wichai Chaijitwanitkul (CPP) 24,724
4. Thirayuth Wanitchang (TRT) 22,777
5. Chaiyos Jiramethakorn (Dem) 26,597
6. Thongdee Manitsarn (TRT) 22,507
7. Thirachai Saenkaew (TRT) 22,278
8. Torpong Chaiyasan (Seritham) 23,054
9. Tharapong Leelawong (Seritham) 24,469
10. Surachart Chamnansin (Seritham) 29,562

Ubon Ratchathani (11 MPs)

1. Re-election
2. Re-election
3. Witoon Nambutr (Dem) 36,634
4. Re-election
5. Chuvit Pitakpornpallop (TRT) 35,773
6. Re-election
7. Adisak Pokkulkanond (TRT) 19,727
8. Poonsawat Hotrawaisaya (TRT) 31,004
9. Suchart Tantivanichanont (TRT) 41,358
10. Re-election
11. Chatri Piriyakitpaibul (TRT) 30,733

Yasothon (4 MPs)

1. Re-election
2. Re-election
3. Re-election
4. Visant Dejsen (NAP) 29,721

South: 14 provinces, 54 seats

Krabi (2 MPs)

1. Arkom Engchuan (Dem) 53,059
2. Pichet Phanvichartkul (Dem) 48,639

Chumphon (3 MPs)

1. Sirisak Onlamai (Dem) 49,635
2. Suchart Kaewnapo (Dem) 46,367
3. Suwaroj Palang (Dem) 50,578

Nakhon Si Thammarat (10 MPs)

1. Huwadiya Pitsuwan (Dem) 39,476
2. Surachet Masadit (Dem) 35,291
3. Narissa Adithepvoraphan (Dem) 46,045
4. Manoj Vichaikul (Dem) 39,517
5. Chinaworn Boonyakiat (Dem) 56,042
6. Tripol Jorjit (Dem) 46,699
7. Prakob Rattanaphan (Dem) 41,032
8. Chamni Sakdiset (Dem) 44,912
9. Apichart Karikan (Dem) 37,989
10. Vitthaya Kaewparadai (Dem) 39,988

Narathiwat (4 MPs)

1. Pornpit Pattanakullert (Dem) 34,135
2. Re-election
3. Najjamudin Uma (NAP) 23,454
4. Re-election

Pattani (4 MPs)

1. Weiroj Pipitpakdi (Dem) 24,553
2. Jeh Isamaair Jehmong (Dem) 26,041
3. Sommart Jehna (Dem) 24,902
4. Muk Sulaiman (NAP) 29,317

Phang-Nga (2 MP)

1. Kantawan Kuljanyavivat (Dem) 41,570
2. Julit Laksanavisit (Dem) 36,674

Phatthalung (3 MPs)

1. Suphat Thammapet (Dem) 45,887
2. Nipit Intharasombat (Dem) 43,245
3. Naris Kamnurak (Dem) 52,853

Phuket (2 MP)

1. Suwit Sa-ngiamkul (Dem) 44,198
2. Chalermlak Kebsub (Dem) 36,398

Ranong (1 MP)

1. Wirat Romyen (Dem) 36,059

Songkhla (8 MPs)

1. Jua Rachasi (Dem) 47,157
2. Lapsak Laparojkit (Dem) 45,253
3. Prai Pattano (Dem) 54,682
4. Vinai Senniem (Dem) 39,013
5. Nibhon Bunyamanee (Dem) 43,822
6. Tavorn Senniem (Dem) 50,638
7. Sirichoke Sopa (Dem) 39,097
8. Vichit Suwit (Dem) 34,503

Satun (2 MPs)

1. Thanin Jaisamut (Dem) 20,492
2. Sanan Suthakul (Dem) 21,450

Surat Thani (6 MPs)

1. Komet Kwanmuang (Dem) 43,751
2. Pravit Nilwatcharamanee (Dem) 44,976
3. Chumpol Kanchana (Dem) 36,751
4. Shane Thaughsuban (Dem) 42,680
5. Sinit Lertkrai (Dem) 55,609
6. Nipa Pringsulaka (Dem) 52,021

Trang (4 MPs)

1. Suwan Kusujarit (Dem) 57,208
2. Tawee Suraban (Dem) 65,458
3. Somchai Losathapornpipit (Dem) 50,503
4. Somboon Uthaiwiankul (Dem) 49,672

Yala (3 MPs)

1. Prasert Pongsuwansiri (Dem) 32,995
2. Paisal Yingsaman (NAP) 33,943
3. Burahanudin Useng (NAP) 25,386
