= Chaturon Chaisang =

Thai politician (born 1956)

Chaturon Chaisang MPCh MWM
- จาตุรนต์ ฉายแสง
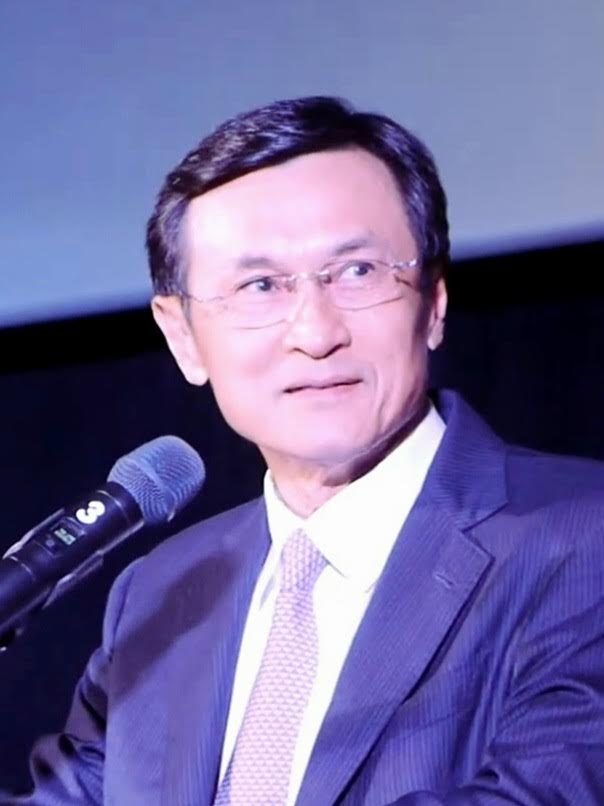
- Chaturon Chaisang in 2017

Deputy Prime Minister of Thailand
- In office 3 October 2002 – 2 August 2005
- Prime Minister: Thaksin Shinawatra

Minister of Education
- In office 30 June 2013 – 22 May 2014
- Prime Minister: Yingluck Shinawatra
- Preceded by: Phongthep Thepkanjana
- Succeeded by: Narong Pipatanasai
- In office 11 March 2005 – 19 September 2006
- Prime Minister: Thaksin Shinawatra
- Preceded by: Adisai Bodharamik
- Succeeded by: Wijit Srisa-arn

Minister of Justice
- In office 5 March 2002 – 3 October 2002
- Prime Minister: Thaksin Shinawatra
- Preceded by: Phongthep Thepkanjana
- Succeeded by: Purachai Piamsomboon

Minister to the Office of the Prime Minister
- In office 17 February 2001 – 5 March 2002
- Prime Minister: Thaksin Shinawatra
- Preceded by: Abhisit Vejjajiva; Jurin Laksanawisit; Paveena Hongsakul; Somboon Rahong
- Succeeded by: Suranand Vejjajiva; Newin Chidchob

Leader of Thai Rak Thai Party Acting
- In office 2 October 2006 – 30 May 2007
- Preceded by: Thaksin Shinawatra
- Succeeded by: party dissolved (de jure); Samak Sundaravej (as Leader of the People's Power Party; de facto)

Personal details
- Born: 1 January 1956 (age 70) Chachoengsao, Thailand
- Party: Pheu Thai (2021–present)
- Other political affiliations: New Aspiration (1992–2000); Thai Rak Thai (2001–2007); Pheu Thai (2011–2018); Thai Raksa Chart (2018–2019)
- Spouse: Jiraporn Piamkamol
- Education: Chiang Mai University; University at Buffalo

Chaturon Chaisang or Chaisaeng (Thai: จาตุรนต์ ฉายแสง, pronounced [t͡ɕāː.tū.rōn t͡ɕʰǎːj.sɛ̌ːŋ], born January 1, 1956) is a Thai politician. He was a government member for several terms, serving as Minister of Justice, Deputy Prime Minister, and Minister of Education in the cabinets of Thaksin and Yingluck Shinawatra.

In the 1970s, Chaturon was one of the leaders of the leftist, pro-democracy students' movement that initiated the October 1973 popular uprising against military dictatorship. After the 1976 Thammasat University massacre and return to authoritarian rule, he joined the illegal Communist Party of Thailand. He later fled to the United States, where he furthered his academic studies, earning a master's degree in economics.

After his return to Thailand in 1986, he joined mainstream politics, representing his home province in Parliament for several terms. He repeatedly switched parties, during most of the 1990s he stayed with the New Aspiration Party, in which he served as secretary general from 1997 until his leave in 2000. He then joined the Thai Rak Thai Party (TRT) of Thaksin Shinawatra, and became a member of Thaksin's government in several positions: Minister to the Office of the Prime Minister (2001–2002), Minister of Justice (2002), Deputy Prime Minister (2002–2005), and Minister of Education (2005–2006).

After the coup d'état of 19 September 2006, he acted as the leader of the disempowered and disintegrating Thai Rak Thai Party until its forced dissolution by the Constitutional Tribunal in May 2007. By the court's decision, he was banned from political activity for five years. In June 2013, he returned to political office, again becoming Minister of Education in Yingluck Shinawatra's cabinet, representing her Pheu Thai Party. He was again removed from office by a military coup on 22 May 2014.

== Education and early political activism ==
Chaturon was born in Chachoengsao. His father, Anand Chaisaeng, was a prominent liberal politician who served as Member of Parliament representing Chahoengsao Province for four terms. Chaturon's younger brother and sister became politicians too. He attended the prestigious Suankularb Wittayalai School.

During his studies at the Faculty of Medicine, Chiang Mai University, he became involved in the students' movement that initiated the October 1973 popular uprising against the military dictatorship of Thanom Kittikachorn. He was a leader of the Pracha Tham ("Dharma Party"), a leftist students' party at Chiang Mai University. The party won the university elections and he became president of the student council. After the Thammasat University massacre of 6 October 1976, he joined the illegal Communist Party of Thailand and hid its camps in the jungle. During this time he was editor of the communist-affiliated student magazine Athipat ("Sovereign").

With his father's help, he then fled to the United States, where he continued his studies. He earned a Bachelor of Arts in economics at the State University of New York at Buffalo and a Master of Arts in economics from the American University in Washington, D.C. He had mostly completed his Ph.D. studies at the American Studies, but did not complete the dissertation, as he chose to return to Thailand to become a Member of Parliament.

== Politics ==
Chaturon was a Member of Parliament from Chachoengsao from 1986 until the 2006 Thai coup d'état. His entry into official Thai politics was planned and supported by his father. He played down his past as a leftist student activist, and instead presented himself as a US-educated, new-generation politician and son of an established MP. Initially affiliated with the Democrat Party, he served as assistant secretary to the deputy minister of finance from 1986 to 1989. He then defected to the minor People's Party (Phak Prachachon), just to join the Thai Nation Party (Chart Thai) little later on invitation by Kraisak Choonhavan, another former leftist student activist and son of Prime Minister Chatichai Choonhavan. In the Chatichai administration, Chaturon was made secretary to the Minister of Commerce.

In 1992, Chaturon again switched parties and joined the New Aspiration Party (NAP) of General Chavalit Yongchaiyudh. Chaturon became a "poster child" and spokesman of this party. After the bloody events of Black May in 1992, Chaturon advocated political reform. He served as the NAP's representative on the special committee for constitutional reform. During all this time, he still maintained contact with his ex-comrades from the time of CPT's armed struggle in Nan Province in the 1970s. In 1995, he became Chairman of the parliamentary Committee on Science and Technology, and in 1996, he became a spokesman of the Constitution Drafting Committee. During Chavalit's premiership from 1996 to 1997, he served as deputy minister of finance. In 1997, he became secretary-general of the NAP. In 1998, he was a member of the committee coordinating the ceremony to remember the 25th anniversary of the 1973 popular uprising. After conflicts with old-style politicians within the NAP, he resigned from the declining party in 2000.

=== Member of Thaksin government ===
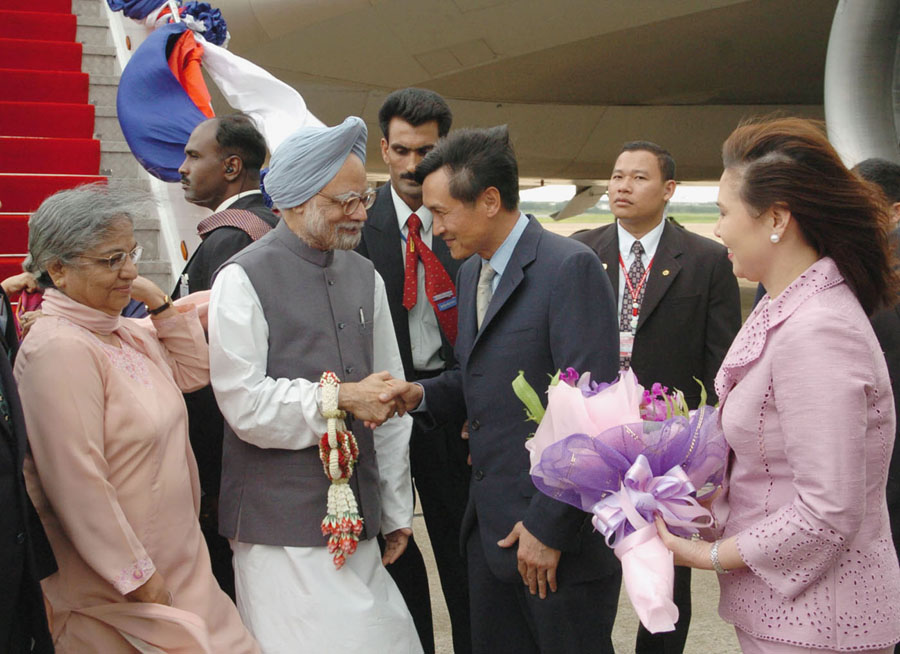
Chaturon Chaisang with Prime Minister Manmohan Singh of India in 2004

He intended to found a new party of his own, but given the difficulties under Thai party law, he instead joined the relatively new Thai Rak Thai Party (TRT) of telecommunications tycoon Thaksin Shinawatra shortly ahead of its landslide success in the 2001 general election. He immediately became a deputy leader of the party. In Thaksin's cabinets, he successively served in different positions. First, he was Minister to the Office of the Prime Minister from 2001 to 2002. In this position, he was responsible for political decentralisation, bureaucratic reform and energy policy. By proposing a decentralisation of revenue collection on a local level and direct election of the chiefs of local administration, he took on conservative bureaucrats in the Ministry of Interior, but also sceptic members of TRT, and even the Prime Minister, who favoured a more centralist leadership. As the cabinet's representative in the Energy Policy Committee, he interfered with the state-owned Electricity Generating Authority of Thailand, when he proposed a more user-friendly clearing of power bills, and endorsed social activists' and groups' demands to cancel several projected power plants and dams.

Thaksin intervened and transferred Chaturon to the Ministry of Justice in March 2002. In this capacity, he created the Department of Special Investigation (DSI) as a government-controlled special unit to counter the influence of the more independent judiciary, prosecution and police force. Again, he had to struggle with resistance from the bureaucratic establishment, and again Thaksin transferred him to a new position: in October 2002 he was appointed Deputy Prime Minister, overseeing social affairs.

In this capacity, he was present in public, presenting a campaign to reduce alcohol consumption, control online computer games, and children’s television time. Moreover, he was tasked to deal with problems in university admission tests. His proposal of a law banning alcohol commercials on TV during prime time, as well as locally and temporally restricting the sale of alcohol met with opposition from the business sector. In 2003, he represented a committee that (unsuccessfully) promoted the idea of making 14 October—the date of the 1973 democratic uprising—a national holiday ("Democracy Day").

In the light of the violent conflict in Thailand's southernmost provinces erupting in 2004, Chaturon proposed a reconciliation and ceasefire plan, calling for an amnesty for Muslim separatists, a reduction in deployed police and the lifting of martial law. The draft was lauded by local partners in the conflict zone, but immediately rejected by the Prime Minister and his security advisers, who instead chose a repressive approach. Chaturon had to take a new position once again, becoming Minister of Education in August 2005. In this position, he tried to advance a reform of the school laws and the structure of the ministry, and to introduce education funds, but failed to convince more conservative forces within the ministry. He was removed from office by the coup d'état of 19 September 2006.

=== After the 2006 coup ===
After the coup, with Thaksin and key party executives either abroad or arrested, Chaturon became the interim party leader after Sudarat Keyuraphan declined to take the post. He strongly condemned the coup, saying it destroyed Thai democracy by violating the liberal 1997 constitution. When the new rulers called political parties to nominate a representative to the National Legislative Assembly, Chaturon refused to do so. The TRT was dissolved by a verdict of the junta-appointed "Constitutional Tribunal" in May 2007. Like other (former) party representatives, the court barred Chaturon from holding political office for five years.

In 2009, Chaturon joined the United Front for Democracy Against Dictatorship (UDD), also known as the Red Shirts movement. Reportedly, Thaksin wanted Chaturon to become one of the movement's leaders, but he could not come out on top, given the network's heterogenous and decentralised structure. Still, Chaturon supported the Red Shirts during their protests in 2010. He condemned the violent strategy of Abhisit Vejjajiva's violent approach toward the protest movement, but also insisted that the Red Shirts should keep a non-violent strategy, arguing against hardcore leaders of the movement.

After his political ban expired, he was re-appointed Minister of Education during a reshuffle in Yingluck Shinawatra's cabinet in June 2013. He was once again removed from power by the military coup d'état of 22 May 2014. Unlike other politicians, he defied the National Council for Peace and Order's order to report to the military leadership. He was arrested after giving interviews at Bangkok's Foreign Correspondents' Club on 27 May.

In the 2019 elections, Chaturon was on the party list for the Thai Raksa Chart Party, an offshoot Pheu Thai. However, Thai Raksa Chart was dissolved by the Constitutional Court prior to election day, thus disqualifying all its candidates. Afterwards, he returned to the Pheu Thai and was elected a party list MP in the 2023 elections.
