= Thammarak Isarangkura na Ayudhaya =

Thai general and politician (born 1938)

- ธรรมรักษ์ อิศรางกูร ณ อยุธยา
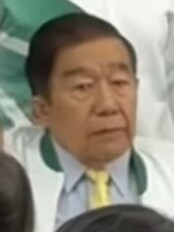

Minister of Defence
- In office 11 March 2005 – 19 September 2006
- Prime Minister: Thaksin Shinawatra
- Preceded by: Sumpun Boonyanunt
- Succeeded by: Boonrod Somtus
- In office 3 October 2002 – 9 March 2004
- Preceded by: Chavalit Yongchaiyudh
- Succeeded by: Chetta Tanajaro

Minister to the Office of the Prime Minister
- In office 9 July 2001 – 3 October 2002
- Prime Minister: Thaksin Shinawatra

Personal details
- Born: 22 July 1938 (age 88) Roi Et, Siam
- Party: Thai Rak Thai Party
- Spouse: Wanida Isarangkun na Ayutthaya
- Education: Chulachomklao Royal Military Academy; Command and General Staff College
- Profession: Soldier; politician

Military service
- Allegiance: Thailand
- Branch/service: Royal Thai Army
- Rank: General; Admiral; Air Chief Marshal
- Commands: Ministry of Defence; Royal Thai Armed Forces Headquarters

Thammarak Isarangkura na Ayudhaya (Thai: ธรรมรักษ์ อิศรางกูร ณ อยุธยา, RTGS: Thammarak Itsarangkun na Ayutthaya; born 22 July 1938) is a former Thai military officer, member of parliament, co-founder of the Thai Rak Thai Party, and former defence minister. He was forced into hiding in the 2006 Thailand coup.

Thammarak is of Chinese descent.

== Early life and education ==
Thammarak was born in Roi Et Province on 22 July 1938. He graduated from Prachawittaya School and Buri Ram boarding school, Secondary school from Suankularb Wittayalai School, and Amnuay Silpa School and then Bachelor of Science from Chulachomklao Royal Military Academy Class 10 and National Defense College, Class 34.

He is married to Wanida Isarangkun na Ayuthaya.

== Careers ==
Thammarak used to serve in the military under the army he used to be a commander in military intelligence then he is the commander of Military Circle in Petchaburi Province. He is the Chief of Staff of the Deputy Chief of Staff and Special Expert of Royal Thai Armed Forces Headquarters.

In addition, he was also Chairman of the Organization for the Transport of Goods and Parcel (ETO).

== Political careers ==
Thammarak was Deputy Prime Minister And the Minister of Defense in the government of Thaksin Shinawatra later, in 2007, political rights were disqualified for 5 years due to being the executive committee of the Thai Rak Thai Party which was dissolved in the 2006 political party dissolution case but Thammarak was sentenced to 3 years and 4 months imprisonment for not guilty on 30 May 2012 for being an official user of the organization or government agencies abusing or abusing their duties in order to cause damage to any person or performing or refraining from performing the duties dishonestly. Later, the case was dismissed because there was no evidence showing that Thammarak had any involvement and the court ordered the case to be removed from the directory.

In the 2019 Thai general election, he was nominated as a political party candidate who would propose to parliament to appoint a prime minister on behalf of the Palang Thai Rak Thai Party.
