= Prommin Lertsuridej =

Thai politician (born 1954)

- พรหมินทร์ เลิศสุริย์เดช

Secretary-General to the Prime Minister
- In office 6 September 2023 – 7 September 2025
- Prime Minister: Srettha Thavisin
- Preceded by: Pirapan Salirathavibhaga
- Succeeded by: Trisulee Trisaranakul
- In office 14 March 2005 – 19 September 2006
- Prime Minister: Thaksin Shinawatra
- Preceded by: Yongyut Tiyapairat
- Succeeded by: Pongthep Tedprathep
- In office 19 February 2001 – 8 October 2002
- Prime Minister: Thaksin Shinawatra
- Preceded by: Nipon Prompan
- Succeeded by: Yongyut Tiyapairat

Minister of Energy
- In office 8 February 2003 – 6 January 2005
- Prime Minister: Thaksin Shinawatra
- Preceded by: Phongthep Thepkanjana
- Succeeded by: Wiset Jupiban

Deputy Prime Minister of Thailand
- In office 3 October 2002 – 8 February 2003
- Prime Minister: Thaksin Shinawatra

Personal details
- Born: 5 November 1954 (age 71) Bangkok, Thailand
- Party: Pheu Thai Party
- Other political affiliations: Thai Rak Thai Party
- Spouse: Mattaya Lertsuridej
- Education: Mahidol University
- Profession: Politician

Prommin Lertsuridej (Thai: พรหมินทร์ เลิศสุริย์เดช, RTGS: Phrommin Loetsuridet; born 5 November 1954) is a Secretary General to Prime Minister Paetongtarn Shinawatra, former student leader, former Secretary General to Prime Minister Thaksin Shinawatra, former Deputy Prime Minister in charge of economic affairs, former Minister of Energy in the Thaksin government, and former Secretary General to Prime Minister Srettha Thavisin. After a 2006 military coup overthrew the Thaksin government, Prommin was arrested and detained by the junta for three weeks. He was released from captivity on 1 October 2006. Prommin is married to Mattaya Lertsuridej, M.D. and has 2 children and 3 grandchildren.

== Student leader ==
As a pre-medical student at Mahidol University, Prommin played a leading role in the student democratic movement after the mass protests against the military regime in 1973. "When I was twenty, I assumed a critical position that resulted in the loss of lives of several of my friends. It is still in my heart. So I don't want to relive that haunting experience again", said Prommin. His role in the burgeoning democratic movement continued until the 6 October 1976 massacre, when the military brutally cracked down on students at Thammasat University.

Prommin joined thousands of students in leaving the cities and joining the Communist Party of Thailand in its insurgency against the military dictatorship. Joining him were several comrades that would become allies in the establishment of the Thai Rak Thai party, like Chaturon Chaisang, Prapat Panyachatraksa, and Surapong Suebwonglee. After 4 years of fighting, the Communist Party collapsed, and Prommin and his comrades laid down their arms under a government amnesty.

== Medical education and career ==
After returning to Bangkok, Prommin resumed his medical studies, graduating with a B.S. from Mahidol in 1982. He completed his medical degree from Mahidol University's Ramathibodi Hospital in 1984.

From 1985 to 1988, Prommin was Director of Nong Song Hong Hospital in Khonkaen. He later completed a Pearson Fellowship (funding by IDRC) in public administration from Ottawa University and Carleton University, Canada and became Director of Phon Hospital, Khonkaen. From 1991 to 1993 he became Head of the Health Planning Section at the Thai Ministry of Public Health. He was admitted to the Board of Preventive Medicine of Thailand in 1992.

== Business career ==
He began his business career in 1993 as Senior Manager of Business Development with IBC Cable TV (which later merged with UTV to become United Broadcasting Corporation). IBC was launched by Thaksin Shinawatra. He later became General Manager of IBC in Cambodia and Laos. In 1995, he was promoted to become IBC's General Manager. From 1997 to 2000, he was appointed VP of Ground Services for Shin Satellite. From November 2000 to February 2001, he was managing director of C.S. Communication, another Shin Corporation company.

== Political career ==
=== Political appointments ===
After Thaksin Shinawatra's Thai Rak Thai party won a landslide election victory in the 2001 elections, Prommin was appointed Secretary General to the Prime Minister. Prommin was Thaksin's primary liaison in managing groups demanding justice and compensation from the government. The role allowed him to utilize the strong understanding of protester psychology he developed during his student days.

From October 2002 to February 2003, he was appointed Deputy Prime Minister in charge of economic affairs, replacing Somkid Jatusripitak. This gave him responsibility for all key economic portfolios, including the Finance Ministry, the Commerce Ministry, the Industry Ministry, the Energy Ministry, the National Energy Policy Committee, the Board of Investment, and the privatisation of state enterprises. Key tasks included managing the 650 billion baht debts of the Financial Institutions Development Fund, price controls for agricultural products, and hallmark Thai Rak Thai grass-roots programs like farmer debt suspension, One Tambon One Product (OTOP), the Village Fund, and the People's Bank.

From February 2003 to March 2005, he was Minister of Energy, primarily responsible for controversial issues like privatization of EGAT and price controls.

In 2020, he came back to politics by rejoining Pheu Thai party and was a key man for the party in the 2023 Thai general election. He was later appointed to be a Secretary General to Prime Minister Srettha Thavisin, the same position he served during Thaksin's administration.

=== Political crisis and detention during the military coup ===
The Thaksin government faced rising opposition from its landslide victory in the 2005 House election. As tensions mounted to critical proportions, Prommin Lertsuridej, almost in tears, gave a public statement in August 2006 begging all sides, both within the government and in the anti-Thaksin People's Alliance for Democracy to try to refrain from violence. His plea fell on deaf ears, with the Bangkok Post calling it an "absurd call."

On 19 September 2006, the Thai military seized power while Thaksin and several other senior government leaders were overseas. Prommin was immediately arrested. He was released from captivity on 1 October 2006.

=== Post 2006 ===
In July 2012, the Court of Appeals imposed a suspended four-month jail sentence and a Bt2,000 fine on former Democrat Party secretary general Suthep Thaugsuban for defaming Prommin Lertsuridej. Lertsuridej had charged Democrat Party leaders with making baseless accusations that he had interfered with the April 2006 elections.

In September 2023, he was appointed to be the Secretary General to Prime Minister Srettha Thavisin.

=== Detention during the 2014 military coup ===
Prommin was ordered to report and detained by the military junta on 23 May 2014 along with hundreds others to classified military compound. He was released on 29 May 2014 after being detained for a week.
