= Thai Rak Thai Party =

Thai political party (1998–2007)

Thai Rak Thai Party พรรคไทยรักไทย Thais Love Thais Party
- Abbreviation: TRT
- Leader: Thaksin Shinawatra (1998–2006); Chaturon Chaisang (2006–2007)
- Spokesperson: Sita Divari
- Founder: Thaksin Shinawatra
- Founded: 14 July 1998
- Dissolved: 30 May 2007
- Succeeded by: Neutral Democratic Party; People's Power Party (de facto)
- Ideology: Civic nationalism Populism; Reformism; Thaksinomics; Neoliberalism; Third Way
- Political position: Centre-right
- Colors: Red, Dark blue

The Thai Rak Thai Party (TRT; Thai: พรรคไทยรักไทย, RTGS: Phak Thai Rak Thai, IPA: [pʰák tʰaj rák tʰaj]; "Thais Love Thais Party") was a Thai political party founded in 1998. From 2001 to 2006, it was the ruling party under its founder, Prime Minister Thaksin Shinawatra. During its brief existence, Thai Rak Thai won the three general elections it contested. Eight months after a military coup forced Thaksin to remain in exile, the party was dissolved on 30 May 2007 by the Constitutional Tribunal for violation of electoral laws, with 111 former party members banned from participating in politics for five years.

== Party platform and electoral outcomes ==
Thai Rak Thai was registered on 15 July 1998, by telecommunications entrepreneur Thaksin Shinawatra and 22 other founding members, including Somkid Jatusripitak, Thanong Bidaya, Sudarat Keyuraphan, Purachai Piumsombun, Thammarak Isaragura na Ayuthaya, and Prommin Lertsuridej.

The Thai Rak Thai party had a populist platform, appealing to indebted farmers, who had become indebted as a result of the 1997 Asian financial crisis, with promises of a strong economic recovery. The party also reached out to rural villages, and struggling businesses. Thai Rak Thai's policies included a 30 baht per hospital visit scheme, an extended debt moratorium for farmers, one million baht microcredit development funds for all rural districts, and the One Tambon One Product project.

Thai Rak Thai won the legislative election of 2001 by a landslide over the ruling Democrat Party led by Prime Minister Chuan Leekpai. Forty percent of elected MPs were freshmen. Thai Rak Thai was able to negotiate a merger with the New Aspiration Party and a coalition with the Thai Nation Party, resulting in a majority of 325 of 500 seats for the coalition government of Thaksin Shinawatra.

The Thai Rak Thai Party was the first political party in Thailand to have been represented by more than half of the members of the House of Representatives. In the 2005 legislative election, the party's candidates were elected to occupy 376 seats of the 500 seats in the House of Representatives, defeating the largest opposition party, the Democrat Party which won 96 seats. After the election, Thailand's first single party government was successfully formed.

In the invalid elections of April 2006, TRT won 61.6 percent of the vote and 460 out of 500 seats, many without any opposition, and the rest remaining vacant because the election was boycotted by opposition parties in the first-past-the-post electoral system.

== Factions ==
As an amalgam of several different parties, Thai Rak Thai politicians owed their allegiance to different factions. Precise figures on faction membership do not exist, but estimates of the numerical strength of the major factions are provided below. These numbers are based on the membership of the House of Representatives elected in the 2005 general election, which was dissolved on 24 February 2006.

- Wang Bua Ban – Led by Thaksin's sister, Yaowapa Wongsawat, this faction is one of the party's most important groupings, as it included many members of prime minister's inner circle. The faction's base is Thaksin's home province of Chiang Mai. It was estimated that Wang Bua Ban commanded the support of over 30 MPs (as of December 2005), mostly from the northern region.
- Wang Nam Yom – Originally a splinter group from Wang Bua Ban, Wang Nam Yom was led by then-Labour Minister Somsak Thepsutin and Industry Minister Suriya Jungrungreangkit, who also served as Thai Rak Thai's Secretary-General. With the financial backing of Suriya, whose family controls the largest auto parts manufacturer in Thailand, some observers claimed that this faction had the resources to form a party in its own right. The group is said to include over 100 MPs, hailing from the northern, northeastern, and central regions of Thailand.
- Wang Nam Yen – This was the most notorious faction, led by the veteran political power-broker, Sanoh Thienthong, a former Interior Minister who held the title of Chief Advisor to the Thai Rak Thai Party. A native of Sa Kaeo Province, Sanoh in the 1990s built a political empire that came to dominate several border provinces in eastern and northeastern Thailand. Rather than start a political party of his own, however, Sanoh preferred to play the role of kingmaker by shifting his group from party to party. With the collapse in 1992 of the pro-military government, which Sanoh supported, the faction moved to the Chart Thai Party, which went on to win the elections held in 1995. Amid squabbles with Chart Thai leader Banharn Silpa-archa, Sanoh then defected to the New Aspiration Party, which won the 1996 elections. However, with New Aspiration's star waning after it was forced out of power in 1997, Sanoh decided to cast his lot with Thai Rak Thai before the 2001 elections. Since joining Thai Rak Thai, however, Wang Nam Yen has largely been sidelined by Thaksin amid occasional squabbles with Sanoh. As a result, Sanoh has become one of Thaksin's most vocal critics in the Thai Rak Thai Party. Wang Nam Yen's electoral fortunes have also declined slightly since joining Thai Rak Thai at the expense of other factions, and as of February 2006, Sanoh commanded the loyalty of only 37 MPs. He and his wife resigned from the TRT in February 2006 to establish the Royalist People's Party.
- Wang Phayanak – This group was led by Deputy Prime Minister Phinij Jarusombat, who was leader of the small Seritham Party before it merged with Thai Rak Thai after the 2001 election. Most of the faction's following of approximately 30 MPs (as of December 2005) hail from the northeastern region, where the group often competes with Wang Nam Yen for influence.
- Wang Lam Takong – This faction was composed of the remnants of the old Chart Pattana (National Development) Party, which merged into Thai Rak Thai before the 2005 elections. Chart Pattana's former leader, Deputy Prime Minister Suwat Liptapanlop, served as head of this group. The faction's influence derives from its strength in the country's second-most populous province, Nakhon Ratchasima, which was the stronghold of Chart Pattana. Wang Lam Katong's membership is estimated to include as many as 20 MPs.
- Bangkok Faction – The leader of this group was Sudarat Keyuraphan and Chalerm Yubamrung
- Chonburi Faction – Former Sports and Tourism Minister Sontaya Kunplome led this faction, which split from the Chart Thai Party before the 2005 elections to join Thai Rak Thai. Sontaya's father is the infamous Somchai Khunpluem, the "godfather" of Chonburi who is better known as "Kamnan Po." The dominant political force in the eastern provinces of Chonburi and Rayong, this faction counts approximately seven MPs under its wing.
- Buriram Faction – Like the Chonburi Faction, this group also defected from the Chart Thai Party before the 2005 elections. The faction's leader is Prime Minister's Office Minister Newin Chidchob, probably one of the most popular members of Thai Rak Thai and at the time was considered to be one of Thaksin's right hand men. It had a solid base in Newin's home province of Buriram and in neighboring Surin Province.
- Ban Rim Nam – This group was led by Deputy House Speaker Suchart Tancharoen, a key figure in the former New Aspiration Party, which merged with Thai Rak Thai after the 2001 elections. The faction has around 15 members.
- Maleenont Faction – Led by Sports and Tourism Minister (as of February 2006) Pracha Maleenont, whose family controls the local broadcasting and entertainment group BEC World. This group's influence derives from the Maleenont family's role as one of the leading financiers of the Thai Rak Thai Party.
- Pongsak Faction – Under the leadership of Transport Minister Pongsak Raktapongpisak, this group has emerged recently as a significant force within the party, counting approximately 30 MPs as supporters as of December 2005. Pongsak's alleged close friendship with Khunying Potjaman Shinawatra, the wife of Prime Minister Thaksin, is said to allow him to wield considerable influence over party and government affairs.

== After the September 2006 coup ==
=== Whereabouts of party leaders after the coup ===
On the evening of 19 September 2006, the Thai military seized control of Bangkok to take over the government. Thaksin Shinawatra was in New York City attending a meeting of the United Nations General Assembly. Most of the TRT executive leadership were also abroad: Deputy Premier Surakiart Sathirathai was with Thaksin in New York, Finance Minister Thanong Bidaya was in Singapore attending the annual meeting of the World Bank/IMF, Commerce Minister Somkid Jatusripitak was attending the Thai-France Cultural Exhibition in Paris with Foreign Minister Kantathi Suphamongkhon and HRH Princess Sirindhorn.

Several party executives remaining in Thailand were arrested and detained by the junta. Deputy Prime Minister in charge of national security Chitchai Wannasathit and Defence Minister Thammarak Isaragura na Ayuthaya were in Thailand and were immediately arrested and detained by the junta. Secretary-General to the Premier Prommin Lertsuridej was also arrested. Natural Resources and Environmental Minister Yongyuth Tiyapairat and Deputy Agriculture Minister Newin Chidchop were ordered to report to the junta by 21 September. Both reported as ordered and were detained.

Several party executives including Chaturon Chaisang, Phumtham Wechayachai, Suranand Vejjajiva, Veera Musikapong, Party Deputy and Industry Minister Suriya Jungrungreangkit and former Social Development and Human Security Minister Watana Muangsook were reported to be in Thailand and free.

=== Reactions from party members ===
With Thaksin and key party executives either abroad or arrested, the reaction of TRT party members was muted and disorganized. In Thaksin's absence, Chaturon Chaisang became the acting party leader.

Several former MPs believed the party would be dissolved by the junta, including former Khon Kaen MP Prajak Kaewklaharn. However, former Udon Thani MP Thirachai Saenkaew, called for the junta to allow Thaksin to contest the next election, claiming that TRT supporters wanted Thaksin to return to politics.

Former Sakon Nakhon MP Chalermchai Ulankul said that although he and others might be unemployed for about a year, his faction was "firm" and preparing to run in the election next year. "As long as the Thai Rak Thai Party is not dissolved, we can't say we will move to be under any other party. However, I don't know who will continue the TRT."

Many party members were reported to have dropped their party membership in the aftermath of the coup. These included Somsak Thepsuthin and 100 members of the Wang Nam Yom faction. It was not clear whether Suriya Jungrungreangkit, another influential member of the faction would also resign. Sonthaya Kunplome also was reported to have led 20 members of the Chonburi faction in resigning from the party. Fear that the party would be dissolved by the junta and its members banned from politics fueled the defections.

On 2 October 2006, Thaksin Shinawatra and his former deputy, Somkid Jatusripitak, resigned from the Thai Rak Thai Party, in all probability ending it as a political force.

== Party dissolution ==
The party's future was in doubt following the military coup that ousted Thaksin's government in September 2006. The party was dissolved on 30 May 2007 by the order of the Constitutional Tribunal for violation of election laws. A few high-ranking party members were found to be directly involved in bribing several small parties into competing in constituencies that were bases of the former opposition parties to ensure that minimum turnout rules were met in favor of the TRT party and its partners. Former Prime Minister Thaksin Shinawatra and 110 members of the party were barred from participating in politics for a five-year period, with only eight of 119 charged acquitted. The remaining MPs and members of the party reorganized in the People's Power Party.

== Thai Rak Thai Party Speaker ==
Name	Portrait	Periods in Office	Election
Uthai Pimjaichon		6 February 2001 – 5 January 2005	2001 (21st)
Pokin Palakul		8 March 2005 – 24 February 2006	2005 (22nd)

== Thai Rak Thai Party Prime Ministers ==
Name	Portrait	Start Date	End Date	Election
Thaksin Shinawatra		9 February 2001	19 September 2006	2001 (21st)
Thaksin Shinawatra		9 February 2001	19 September 2006	2005 (22nd)

== General election results ==
Election	Total seats won	Total votes	Share of votes	Outcome of election	Election leader
2001	248 / 500	11,634,495	39.9%	▲248 seats; Governing coalition (TRT-NAP-CTP-NDP)	Thaksin Shinawatra
2005	377 / 500	18,993,073	60.5%	▲127 seats; Governing party	Thaksin Shinawatra
2006	460 / 500	16,246,368	59.9%	▲85 seats; nullified	Thaksin Shinawatra
