= International reactions to the 2006 Thai coup d'état =

The 2006 Thailand coup d'état took place on 19 September 2006, when members of the Royal Thai Army staged a coup against the government of Prime Minister Thaksin Shinawatra. The coup, which is Thailand's first in fifteen years, followed a year-long political crisis involving Thaksin and political opponents and occurred less than a month before elections were scheduled to be held, on 15 October. The military postponed the upcoming elections, suspended the Constitution, dissolved Parliament, banned protests, suppressed and censored media outlets, declared martial law, and arrested Cabinet members. The coup was bloodless, with no casualties reported.

Many organizations and countries expressed their concern about the situation and hope for a peaceful resolution. Some countries advised recent travelers to Thailand to be alert due to safety concerns. International government statements concerning the coup ranged from harsh denunciations (including Australia, New Zealand, Denmark) to non-interference (including China, Laos). The US stated it was "disappointed" and that the coup had "no justification".

== Americas ==
- Canada – In a press release, Minister of Foreign Affairs Peter MacKay said, "Canada is deeply concerned by these developments. We urge a peaceful solution to this crisis in conformity with the country’s constitution. Thailand has made marked progress in terms of respect for human rights and the rule of law, and Canada urges all parties to continue to uphold these values."
- United States
  - The State Department initially announced that it was "monitoring the situation with concern." A spokesman said, "We look to the Thai people to resolve their political differences in a peaceful manner and in accord with the principles of democracy and the rule of law."
  - Later on, the US's criticism increased in severity, with State Department Deputy Spokesman Tom Casey saying, "There's no justification for a military coup in Thailand or in anyplace else, and we certainly are extremely disappointed by this action. It's a step backward for democracy in Thailand. We very much urge that democratic elections are held as soon as possible, which is a commitment military officials have made. That commitment needs to be met, and it needs to be respected. There are also consequences when these kinds of actions take place, and obviously, in light of what's happened, in light of this coup, there are aspects of our relationship that we're going to have to review." Casey later noted that the US would like to see elections held earlier than the one-year timetable set by the coup leaders.
  - U.S. Ambassador to the UN John R. Bolton noted that "We have press reports and I think for now the important thing is to look for the sustaining of constitutional processes in Thailand."
  - White House Press Secretary Tony Snow said that "We're disappointed in the coup. We hope those who mounted it will make good and make good swiftly on their promises to restore democracy." Snow also hinted that currently inconclusive talks with Bangkok on a Free Trade Agreement, might also depend on a return to democratic rule. "Once you have democracy restored, we'll also be in a position to move forward on a free trade agreement with them."
  - Tom Casey also warned that certain US aid to Thailand could be reviewed, figures appear to be referring to some categories of assistance dependent on democracy being maintained. Casey later noted that the US is also reviewing its aid to Thailand. Under the so-called Foreign Operations Assistance Act, the United States has budgeted about 14 million dollars in bilateral assistance, including four million dollars in the military area, to Thailand in fiscal 2006.
  - The US also warned the junta from taking actions for political purposes, like investigating or seizing the assets of Thaksin Shinawatra.
  - The United States later cut off $24 million in aid, including foreign military financing, international military education and training, and peacekeeping operations. "We look forward to being able to reinstate these programs after a democratically-elected government takes office," State Department spokesman Sean McCormack said. Official US military trips to Thailand were also suspended and US military personnel in Thailand were recalled.
  - The US later expressed concern about rumors that the junta would appoint General Surayud Chulanont as Prime Minister, noting that "Somebody with close ties to the military is going to have to at least overcome the perception that they are maintaining a close relationship with the military and may be not acting in defense of Thai democracy."
  - However, Surayud's quick designation by the junta was later welcomed by Tom Casey, US State Department deputy spokesman. "In naming Prime Minister Surayud, the council did fulfill a pledge that it made to its people as well as to the international community, to name an interim prime minister within two weeks of taking power," Casey said, adding "My understanding is the interim constitution that he will be working under provides guarantees for basic civil liberties and basic rights of the people, and that that is something we very much want to see carried out". A declaration followed a day later by a warning from White House spokeswoman Dana Perino "We remain concerned by restrictions on civil liberties, provisions in the draft constitution that appear to give the military an ongoing and influential role in decision-making, and the lengthy timetable for democratic elections."
- Costa Rica – Finance Minister Guillermo Zúñiga lamented the fact that some people think "these types of ways [coups] can solve problems."

== Asia ==
- China – Beijing brushed off Thailand's military coup as an internal affair and wished the country "harmony and prosperity". "It's Thailand's own internal affair. The PRC has consistently upheld the principle of non-interference in other countries' internal affairs," the foreign ministry said in a statement posted on its website.
- Hong Kong – Security secretary Ambrose Lee said on 20 September that Hong Kong residents in Thailand should take care of themselves, their property and their personal safety. The Security Bureau reminded Hong Kong residents going to Thailand that they should keep themselves abreast of the latest developments and pay attention to personal safety, and said the government would continue to closely monitor the situation.
- India – New Delhi issued a statement urging all Indian citizens in Thailand to contact the embassy in Bangkok. The foreign ministry condemns any act that hinders democracy and also hopes that there will be a smooth transition of power from the military to the representatives of the last election, which itself is mired in controversy.
- Indonesia – The Indonesian government, through its foreign ministry spokesman Desra Percaya, states that Indonesia "expects that the principles of democracy ... would be further upheld, ... [and] further hopes that the political crisis in Thailand could be resolved amicably and democratically for the greater interest of the people of Thailand."
- Japan – Japan's Foreign Minister said the military coup in Thailand was regrettable and urged efforts to quickly restore democracy.
- South Korea – a Foreign Ministry spokesman said, "We hope Thailand will restore peace according to legal procedures."
- Laos – Lao Foreign Ministry Spokesman, Yong Chantalangsy, has said "These are interior affairs of Thailand. No comment, we are following the situation very closely." No border points have been closed between the two countries. "Everything is normal and flights are operating as usual," the Yong Chantalangsy said.
- Malaysia – Prime Minister Abdullah Ahmad Badawi of Malaysia expressed shock over the coup. He said, "I was taken aback. This is not the way for a change in government that people like to see. By right, there should be an election." He said he hoped that an election would take place soon and that the country would eventually be ruled by a democratically elected government. Foreign Minister Syed Hamid Albar added that, 'A change in government through a military coup is not an accepted way.'
- Pakistan – a Foreign Ministry spokeswoman said, "We hope for calm and avoidance of violence." and further added "We want to see political stability in Thailand which is a very important member of ASEAN (Association of Southeast Asian Nations) and has made important contributions to ASEAN's development,"
- Philippines – President Gloria Macapagal Arroyo and several lawmakers have said that they are concerned about the coup in Thailand. In addition, they are confident in the loyalty of the Armed Forces of the Philippines. President Arroyo is monitoring the situation from the UN headquarters in New York. Although the government has not issued an official statement, Senator Richard Gordon said that he calls for President Arroyo to lash out at Sonthi Boonyaratglin for launching the coup.
- Singapore – Ministry of Foreign Affairs, "Singapore hopes all parties involved will work towards a positive outcome." The ministry "hopes the situation there will return to normal as soon as possible." Foreign Minister George Yeo has expressed his shock and deep concern over the recent coup in Thailand. He said that Singapore called on all parties involved to seek reconciliation and restore constitutional Government as soon as possible.
- Republic of China (Taiwan) – The Republic of China's Ministry of Foreign Affairs advised recent travellers to Thailand to be alert due to safety concerns.

== Europe ==
- European Union – A spokesman for the President of the European Council and Prime Minister of Finland, Matti Vanhanen, noted his "grave concern" and added, "It is highly regrettable that democratic institutions seem to have been taken over by military force. Prime Minister Vanhanen emphasises the need to revert to democratic order without delay."
- Netherlands – Herman van Gelderen, spokesman for the Dutch Foreign Minister, said the minister was "very worried" but could not comment further for want of information.
- Norway – Foreign Minister Jonas Gahr Støre stated, "The armed forces must step down to allow the return of the democratically elected government. I hope the situation will be resolved peacefully, and that the country returns to democratic order as soon as possible."
- Sweden – Minister for foreign affairs and former president of the United Nations General Assembly Jan Eliasson stated, "I am very concerned about the information from Bangkok tonight that a military coup d'état has taken place. The situation is not yet clear, but it is imperative that political differences are resolved within the framework of the constitution, peacefully and in accordance with democratic principles and with respect for human rights. We are naturally following developments in Bangkok very closely."
- Denmark – Foreign minister Per Stig Møller denounced the coup, calling it "banana republic-like, that the military seizes power while the PM is out of the country. But it's not over yet, there's no conclusion yet. Thaksin has a lot of support outside Bangkok. So we'll have to see what happens when he returns home. I just hope it does not end in violence. I hope that democracy will be re-established in Thailand."
- United Kingdom – Foreign Secretary Margaret Beckett stated, "We are never happy about military attempts to overthrow a government, if that is what is happening. But we very much hope there will be peace and the situation will be resolved and that some peaceful way out of the problem will be determined." A Foreign Office spokeswoman later added, "There are elections scheduled for October and November and we are actively trying to find out whether those elections will go ahead or not. Obviously, we believe they should."
  - A group of Thai students called "Oxford Initiative" (OI) was in the process of issuing a statement after a meeting on Thursday to express disagreement with the coup. A leading member of the group speaking on condition of anonymity said he regretted that the Thai military had chosen to achieve political ends through non-democratic means. He added that views of OI members are not necessarily representative of the entire community of Thai students in Oxford who are more or less divided over the current coup.
- Russia – The Russian Foreign Ministry said in a statement, "We hope that a way out of the current situation will be found with a rapid return to the path of constitutional rule and by the reinforcement of the democratic process with the participation of all political forces." Russian Foreign Minister Sergei Lavrov also noted that his "opinion is that everybody should be governed by the need to strengthen the constitutional regime in the country."
- Ireland – The Irish Department of Foreign Affairs stated that it was monitoring the situation and has asked Irish people there to exercise utmost caution.

== Oceania ==
- Australia – Foreign Minister of Australia Alexander Downer stated, "We want to see a return to democratic rule. It’s of grave concern for us that the government has been overthrown in this way. There was an expectation in Thailand that there would be an election towards the end of this year and it is of concern to us that the military appear to have simply seized power." The Australian Labor Party's foreign affairs spokesman, Kevin Rudd, noted that the coup "needs to be condemned and condemned unequivocally," adding that "The way to resolve these crises is through democratic and constitutional means. A coup d'etat is a direct assault on democracy itself. The region cannot stand idly by and leave such actions uncondemned."
- New Zealand – New Zealand Prime Minister Helen Clark condemned the coup, saying that New Zealand "condemns any process which seeks to overturn a government by unconstitutional and undemocratic means." She added that "New Zealand urges all political and military players to resolve their differences peacefully and to act in accordance with Thailand's constitution and democratic principles," and that she was "deeply disturbed" by reports from Thailand.

== Africa ==
- South Africa – cut all official visits with Thailand to protest the coup.

== International ==
- United Nations – United Nations Secretary-General Kofi Annan told CNN, "I don't have the details but this is not a practice to be encouraged." He also said, "As the African Union, for example, has indicated, they do not support those who come to power through the barrel of a gun," and "Over the past decade or so, they have established a solid democracy and institutions under the leadership of the King. I'm sure they will be able to restore that institution and go back to a democratic system as soon as possible."
  - The UN High Commissioner for Human Rights noted that the coup contravened human rights conventions and urged the junta "to ensure respect for human rights and fundamental freedoms and reinstate the country's human rights commission." Although the National Human Rights Commission was not disbanded, it did support the coup.
- International Monetary Fund – IMF Managing Director Rodrigo Rato stated at the IMF's annual meeting in Singapore that, "We are following developments very closely and look forward for the evolution and benefit of democracy and stability in the country."
- Inter-Parliamentary Union – The IPU disqualified Thailand as the host of its 116th Assembly from 29 April – 4 May 2007 on grounds that Thailand's post-coup legislature was not elected. The IPU instead chose Indonesia as host.

== International media ==
The Economist came out against the coup: "Military coups, like wars, are easy to start but hard to end... The generals' error is to assume that a coup will solve anything. Whenever an election is held, Mr Thaksin's rural, populist Thai Rak Thai party will surely do well, whether or not he is allowed back into the country to lead it. And the principle of changing governments by street protest and military putsch has been re-established, undoing all the progress of the past decade, which had seen Thailand slowly emerge from the shadow of the barracks and the royal palace. More instability, not less, is the likely outcome. Nor is turmoil likely to help clean up political life." The piece continued to state how the general lack of international condemnation for the coup might embolden military leaders or reinforce authoritative tendencies in neighboring countries.

The New York Times also criticized the coup, noting that "With the coup, Thailand became one more Southeast Asian nation that has reinterpreted democracy in undemocratic terms, either manipulating or sidestepping constitutional processes to achieve political ends... Now both Thailand and the Philippines, the region’s two exemplars of democracy, have ousted democratically elected leaders. [As for other Southeast Asian nations,] each nation argues that its departures from democracy are a necessary response to local conditions."
