= Thaksinomics =

Economic policies of Thaksin Shinawatra

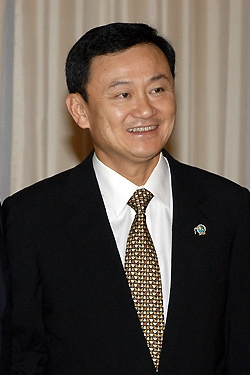
Thaksin Shinawatra in 2003

Thaksinomics (a portmanteau of "Thaksin" and "economics") is a term used to refer to the economic set of policies of Thaksin Shinawatra, the 23rd prime minister of Thailand from 2001 to 2006. There has been considerable controversy over the role Thaksinomics has played in Thailand's recovery from the 1997 Asian financial crisis. Among the most prominent advocates of Thaksin's economic policies is Morgan Stanley economist Daniel Lian. Thaksinomics combines neoliberalism with Keynesianism.

The term was coined by the Philippines president Gloria Macapagal Arroyo during the 2003 Nikkei in which she explained how she conducted her economic policy by following Thaksin's "domestic consumption-based (and) managed asset reflation".

== Overview ==
Thaksinomics is a dual-track policy where one portion of the economic policy concentrates on foreign investment and trade. Meanwhile, the other portion is a collective of populist policies crafted to reduce poverty and strengthen small/local businesses. The idea behind this strategy was to develop and industrialize Thailand by financing and strengthening local industries. As Thailand would gain more capital, it would then increase GDP per capita and, over time, be redistributed to the poor of the nation. This would create a positive loop, where as the nations grow, the citizens would become wealthier and hence choose to engage with the economy more and more, creating a positive feedback loop. Needless to say, Thaksinomics was based on the Keynesian belief that controlling monetary controls would be able to return aggregate demand. The policies succeeded in growing the nation in terms of capital, but the effect of populist policies on relative poverty is debated. The policies of Thaksinomics have included:

- A four-year debt moratorium for farmers, combined with orders to Thailand's state-owned banks to increase loans to farmers, villages and SMEs (small and medium-size enterprises) at low interest rates.
- Subsidized transportation vehicle fuel prices, starting January 2004 in order to alleviate the impact of rising world oil prices on consumers. The government also forced the state-owned electricity company EGAT to partially subsidize electricity tariffs.
- Creating cartels or consortiums to increase the price of exports. (Such as in the rubber industry)
- In the policy of public health, Thaksin started the 30-baht universal healthcare program, which guarantees universal healthcare coverage for just 30 Baht (about US$0.95) a visit at state hospitals. Although highly popular, especially among lower income Thais who were previously denied healthcare because of their income, the policy was strongly criticized by physicians.
- The One Tambon One Product (OTOP) program, which stimulates the development of rural small and medium-sized enterprises.
- Thaksin has pushed for continued privatization of state-owned enterprises. Although it is a continuation of the Democrat-initiated policies of the late-'90s, Thaksin has consistently pushed for the privatization of the state-owned electricity company EGAT. However, EGAT is still state-owned.
- "Mega Projects": During Thaksin's tenure, this involved investing over $50 billion in public infrastructure, including roads, public transit, and a new international airport.

Supporters of Thaksinomics argue that these policies, implemented in the aftermath of the Asian Financial Crisis, have driven a stable, demand-driven recovery of Thailand's economy, which was previously dependent on exports, making it vulnerable to external shocks. They also point out that under the Thaksin administration, Thailand has repaid all of its debts to the International Monetary Fund (incurred after the Asian Financial Crisis) four years ahead of schedule.

These policies have made Thaksin Shinawatra popular. After an unprecedented four years as prime minister, his populist Thai Rak Thai party won a landslide victory in the February 2005 elections, winning 374 out of 500 seats in Parliament. This was the largest number of parliamentary seats ever gained by a single party in Thailand's history.

Critics of Thaksinomics claim that Thaksin's economic policies amount to little more than traditional Keynesian fiscal stimulus policies rebranded as a revolutionary economic doctrine. They argue that, contrary to the claims of Thaksinomics's advocates, Thailand's economy was actually driven by rising export demand, while domestic consumer demand has grown only modestly at best since Thaksin became Prime Minister. Skeptics also note that under Thaksin's policy of pushing state-owned banks to increase loans to poor farmers, consumer indebtedness has risen dramatically. They state that the banks often made loans without proper due diligence to people who had little means to repay the loans. Thaksin's supporters often counter by pointing out that the percentage of non-performing loans in the banking system has fallen during his administration.

== Thaksinomics in practice ==
By 2001, the currency had appreciated to an export-friendly level, and the economy had fully recovered from the 1997 Asian financial crisis. The strong performance of the Thai economy beginning in 2002 was the immediate impact of Thaksinomics. In 2002, Thailand posted GDP growth of 5.3%, the fastest rate since 1996. The economy grew by another 7.1% in 2003. In 2004, in spite of a volatile external environment and rising oil prices, Thailand still managed a GDP growth rate of 6.3%.

Since 2005, however, there has been considerable controversy concerning Thaksinomics. Although the reelection of Thaksin and his Thai Rak Thai party in an unprecedented landslide in February demonstrated the widespread popularity of his policies, slower economic growth (4.5% in 2005), has given ammunition to critics of Thaksinomics. Thaksin's supporters argue that the economic slowdown is largely a result of the 2004 Indian Ocean earthquake and tsunami and rising oil prices and inflation. But others point out that consumer indebtedness and trade deficits plagued the Thai economy in 2005, as a direct result of Thaksin's policies. Thaksin was forced into an embarrassing retreat in July 2005 when the trade deficit and public debt caused the government to abandon its transportation vehicle fuel price subsidy. Corruption allegations stemming from public contracts in the construction of Suvarnabhumi Airport also threatened to cloud the future of Thaksin's public infrastructure projects that formed the core of his second-term economic policies.

Another important feature of Thaksinomics is free trade. From 2002 to 2007, the Thaksin government signed free trade agreements (FTA) with China, New Zealand, Australia, India and United Arab Emirates. Prior to being overthrown by a military coup in 2006, FTA negotiations were being made with the United States and Japan. Supporters claimed that there was an overall positive benefit from the trade agreements, especially given Thailand's historical reliance on exports. However, critics argued that FTA agreements were unconstitutional for not having been approved by the parliament, and subsequent governments attempted constitutional reforms that would make parliamentary approval necessary. Critics also claimed that no detailed studies and analysis on the losses and gains have been made public. Officials in charge were instructed to present one-sided "win win" analysis to questions about the FTAs. The military government's Senate Committee on Foreign Affairs found that the Thai-Chinese free trade agreement on agriculture products resulted in an overall decline in local production. The study reported in 2005 a 70% decline in the production of red onion, garlic and other vegetables due to their inability to compete with cheaper products from Yunan Province; Chinese garlic sells for 3 to 5 baht per kilogram as opposed to 30 to 35 baht per kilogram for the Thai garlic. King Bhumibol's Royal Agriculture Projects for the hill tribes reported a decline in sales of their products since the trade agreement with China. In 2007 the UN on Crime and Drugs (Bangkok office) reported that Thailand is now listed as a country identified as an 'illegal drug producer' (involving some 3,000 families growing mostly opium) in five provinces – all in the North. In the 1990s Thailand was an exemplary country for its total eradication of opium production, despite rising levels of addiction and trade.

Even after the 2006 coup, the Thai government yearly reports give an overtly positive picture of free trade agreements only showing increase trade volumes with the 'partners'. Export gains by and large benefit agricultural co-operates like the giant Charoen Pokaphand, multi-nationals like Toyota, Mitsubishi, Nissan, Nike and others. FTAs also gave Thaksin's family business a big boost. After years of negotiating, the Chinese government finally allowed iPSTAR of the Shin Corporation to operate its broadband satellite telecommunication. The Australian Ministry of Foreign Affairs and Commerce made one announcement after the FTA – 'Australians will now have access to broad band telecommunication with the investment of $280 million from Thailand's iPSTAR'.

== See also ==
- Abenomics
- Clintonomics
- Obamanomics
- Reaganomics
- Rogernomics
- Thaksinocracy
- Thatcherism
