= Daniel Lian =

Daniel Lian is a Southeast Asia Economist for Morgan Stanley, based out of Singapore. He holds a Ph.D. in economics from the East-West Center in Honolulu, Hawaii.

Lian is perhaps best known as a prominent proponent of Thaksinomics, a set of economic policies advocated by Thai Prime Minister Thaksin Shinawatra designed to steer Thailand out of the Asian financial crisis.

Lian's close personal relationship with Prime Minister Thaksin has raised concerns of a possible conflict of interest that could impugn his impartiality and credibility in his role as an analyst of the Thai economy. In October 2005, more light was shed on the nature of his relationship with Thaksin when a letter that Lian had written to the Prime Minister was leaked to the Bangkok-based English-language newspaper Thai Day. In the letter, Lian thanked Thaksin for a dinner he had recently hosted and also noted the efforts that Lian had made on Thaksin's behalf. These efforts included assisting with a road show held in Hong Kong. He then questioned whether Thailand's opposition Democrat Party and its leader Abhisit Vejjajiva had anything to offer "the Thai people" other than a "pretty young face", a sarcastic reference to Abhisit's reputation as a handsome young politician.
