= Chitchai Wannasathit =

Thai politician (born 1946)

Police General Chidchai Vanasatidya
- ชิดชัย วรรณสถิตย์
- Chitchai in 2025

Acting Prime Minister of Thailand
- In office 5 April 2006 – 23 May 2006
- Monarch: Bhumibol Adulyadej
- Prime Minister: Thaksin Shinawatra (Note: Thaksin Shinawatra was on leave from 5 April 2006 to 23 May 2006 and Wannasathit served as acting Prime Minister during that time.)

Deputy Prime Minister of Thailand
- In office 11 March 2005 – 19 September 2006
- Prime Minister: Thaksin Shinawatra; Himself (acting)

Minister of Justice
- In office 2 August 2005 – 19 September 2006
- Prime Minister: Thaksin Shinawatra; Himself (acting)
- Preceded by: Suwat Liptapanlop
- Succeeded by: Charnchai Likitjittha

Minister of Interior
- In office 11 March 2005 – 2 August 2005
- Prime Minister: Thaksin Shinawatra
- Preceded by: Phokin Polkul
- Succeeded by: Kongsak Wantana

Personal details
- Born: 13 August 1946 (age 80) Ubon Ratchathani, Siam
- Other political affiliations: Thai Rak Thai (1999–2007)
- Spouse: Atchara Wannasathit
- Education: Royal Police Cadet Academy; University of Louisville (Ph.D.)

Military service
- Allegiance: Thailand
- Branch/service: Royal Thai Police; Volunteer Defense Corps
- Rank: Police General; VDC Gen.

Police General Chitchai Wannasathit (Thai: ชิดชัย วรรณสถิตย์, Thai pronunciation: [t͡ɕʰít.t͡ɕʰaj wan.ná.sà.tʰìt]; Chinese: 曹壁光; pinyin: Cáo Bìguāng; born 13 August 1946 in Ubon Ratchathani Province) was the acting prime minister of Thailand from April to May 2006, when Thaksin Shinawatra took a break from his duties as prime minister following a disappointing showing in elections. Thaksin returned to his duties after more than a month. Chitchai Wannasathit was simultaneously the deputy prime minister and justice minister. On 19 September 2006, he was arrested by the Thai military during the 2006 coup d'état, but was soon released.

== Education ==
- Amnuay Silpa School
- National Defence College of Thailand

== Personal life ==
He was of Chinese descent.

== Notes ==
Political offices
Preceded by Thaksin Shinawatra	Prime Minister of Thailand; Acting; 2006	Succeeded by Thaksin Shinawatra
