= October 2006 Thai general election =

After Thailand's April 2006 elections were declared invalid by the Constitutional Court, it was decided that new elections would be held on 15 October 2006. Due to delays in the nomination of a new election committee the election were likely to be moved to November, but then cancelled indefinitely after the military's overthrow of the Thai government.

== Background ==
The April elections were boycotted by the major opposition parties (the Democrat Party, the Mahachon Party, and Chart Thai Party). The results of the April elections, in which the ruling Thai Rak Thai Party won by a landslide, were disqualified by the Constitutional Court due to the placement of voting booths.

On 30 May, the Cabinet endorsed an Election Commission proposal to hold a new round of elections on 15 October 2006. The new election date allowed politicians 9 days time (by 8 June) to switch parties. The Thai constitution requires politicians to maintain their party membership for 90 days before being eligible to register as election candidates. The election date was affirmed by the signing of the royal decree by King Bhumibol Adulyadej on July 20, 2006.

== Political Events Prior to the Election ==
=== Pressure for the Election Commission to resign ===
The Constitutional Court and Opposition parties pressured the Election Commission to resign due to the disqualification of the April election. However, Commission head Vasana Puemlarp and the two other remaining commissioners refused to resign. The Criminal Court later jailed the three Commissioners who refused to resign, forcing the appointment of a new set of Commissioners.

=== Defections and establishment of new parties ===
==== From Thai Rak Thai ====
Rumors were rampant prior to the election that many MPs from the ruling Thai Rak Thai would defect. Former TRT party-list MPs Likhit Dhiravegin and Sarit Santimethanedol left to establish the Phalang Phaendin party ("Strength of the Land"), claiming that 40 TRT Wang Nam Yen defectors would follow them. However, as of 5 June, no other MPs defected. Wang Nam Yom faction member Banyin Tangpakorn was quoted as saying that no more than 5 members wanted to defect.

Sanoh Thienthong, head of the TRT's powerful rebel Wang Nam Yen faction, had resigned from the TRT in February, along with his wife, Uraiwan (then Culture Minister). He later established the Pracharaj Party. Joining Sanoh in resigning from the TRT was party-list MP Winai Sompong. Sora-at Klinpratoom, another influential Wang Nam Yen member, resigned from the ICT Ministry, but did not resign from the TRT party. Outspoken businessman and founder of Thai Petrochemical Industry (TPI) Prachai Leophai-ratana also joined the Pracharaj Party as its secretary-general. Pramual Rujanasseri, Boonthueng Pholphanit and Chucheep Harnsawat were appointed as deputy party leaders.

Former Deputy Environment Minister Prapat Panyachatraksa (nicknamed "Kan Yao" for his heroism during the pro-democracy protests of 1973) had resigned from the TRT during the height of anti-Thaksin protests in March 2006.

As of May 2006, members of the Wang Bua Ban, Wang Phayanak, and Ban Rim Nam factions of the TRT party declared that they would not defect. Phayao MP Aruni Chamnanya was quoted as saying "I am not a politician who sells myself by party hopping."

==== From Mahachon ====
Tun Jintavej and Chatchawan Chompudaeng, members of the Mahachon Party, defected to the Chart Thai Party. Anek Laothammathat, the former Mahachon Party leader, joined the new Maharaj Party.

==== From Chart Thai ====
Former Chart Thai MP for Ratchaburi, Vijai Wattanaprasit, moved to the Pracharaj Party. Former Chat Thai MP for Chanthaburi Province Khomkhai Pollabutr moved to the Democrat Party.

==== From Democrat ====
Mahachon Party leader Sanan Kachornprasart claimed that former Democrat secretary-general Pradit Pattaraprasit had decided to join Mahachon and contest the election. However, Pradit, who had earlier resigned from the Democrat party, denied Sanan's claim.

==== Other ====
The New Aspiration Party, led by Chingchai Mongcoltam, planned to merge with Maharaj. Outgoing Senators Kraisak Choonhavan and Karun Sai-ngam also joined Maharaj. Outgoing Senator Pichet Pattanachot joined the Democrat Party and plans to contest Nakhon Ratchasima's Constituency 1.

The political affiliation of former Deputy Prime Minister and TRT co-founder Purachai Piumsombun was the target of much political rumor. Purachai had earlier retired from politics, but his popularity led many to believe that he would re-enter politics under a different party. As Deputy Prime Minister, Purachai had led a controversial "social order" campaign that made him highly popular among many Bangkokians.

The People's Alliance for Democracy, which had led many anti-Thaksin protests from 2005 to 2006, established a new party, the Mass Party. However, they vowed not to field candidates for election. "If we field MP candidates, we will be trapped in vicious circles of money politics," said Somkiat Pongpaibun, a PAD leader. Somkiat was joined by former Palang Dharma Party leader Chaiwat Sinsuwong and the Campaign for Popular Democracy's Pipop Thongchai.

Khon Kaen caretaker Senator Rabiebrat Pongpanit co-founded the Thai Women party.

=== Election platforms and campaigning ===
==== Democrat party ====
On 29 April, party leader Abhisit Vejjajiva promised an "agenda for people", with education as the main focus. He also vowed not to privatize basic utilities like electricity and water supply and also to nationalize those enterprises which had previously been privatized. However, he later backtracked and promised not to renationalize the oil and gas company PTT. He also promised that core Thai Rak Thai populist policies like the 30-baht universal healthcare scheme, the Village Fund and the SML scheme would not be cancelled but improved. He later promised that Thaksin's popular 30-baht universal healthcare scheme would be abolished immediately, and replaced with a system where access to medical services would be totally free. He also said that all future Democrat MPs will have to declare their assets and possible involvement in any private companies (under Thai law, only those who take a government position have to declare their assets). In addition, MPs, Government ministers, and their families would also be required to disclose benefits they received from business connections. He also proposed a 10 million THB limit to the amount that any individual could contribute to a political party in one year. He also proposed to reduce the number of votes necessary to force a vote of no confidence to just one-tenth of the House.

Abhisit also promised many populist policies, including:

- Providing quality universal healthcare for no cost. The Thaksin-originated universal healthcare scheme provides coverage for 30 Baht (approx. US$0.9 ) per visit.
- Providing free education, textbooks, milk and supplemental foods for kindergartens
- Increasing the minimum wage

On the Democrat Party's 60th Anniversary dinner, Abhisit raised over THB 200 Million in funds from attendants. He outlined several energy policies including:

- Increasing dividend payments from PTT and using the funds to repay Oil Fund debts
- Allowing EGAT to bear the burden of rising fuel prices, since a non SET-listed EGAT would have no minimum return on investment.

On 13 July 2006, facing escalating violence in the South, Abhisit promised to solve the insurgency by making the problems in the deep South a public agenda.

In late July 2006, party leader Abhisit Vejjajiva appeared on two television advertisements. The first tried to portray Abhisit as a family man, while the second suggested that people cope with the high cost of living by cutting down on energy consumption. Two additional advertisements were scheduled to air in August, the third focusing on free education, and the fourth on free health care. Prime Minister Thaksin commended the spots, and Abhisit claimed spots were well received. However, pollsters at ABAC Poll and the BU Poll Centre doubted that the spots would impress grassroots voters.

==== Thai Rak Thai party ====
The Thai Rak Thai party promised to expand Bangkok's mass transit network with ten new electric train routes covering 300 km. The new network would have a flat cost of just 15 THB per ride. The TRT also proposed building home units along the new lines. The new rail networks would be built through direct government investment, rather than through private concessions.

=== Predictive measures ===
==== Polls ====
A nationwide poll conducted in mid-July found that 49% of respondents would vote for Thai Rak Thai, while 42.5% preferred one of the oppisiton parties. 84.3% of those surveyed said they would vote in the poll; of those, 29.2% said they would not vote for any political party, marking instead the "no vote" box, indicating abstention.

A Bangkok poll in conducted mid-August found that 38% of respondents would vote for Thai Rak Thai, with 24% voting for the Democrats, 10% voting for Chart Thai, and 6% for other parties.

==== Other elections ====
In the 30 July Bangkok Metropolitan Administration council elections, the Democrats won 35 out of 57 seats in the Bangkok city council, with 18 seats going to TRT. The Democrats also swept 176 out of 255 district council seats in the Bangkok district council elections held on the same day, while Thai Rak Thai won 71 seats and independent candidates won eight seats.

== 2006 Thai coup d'état ==
On 19 September 2006, less than a month before the scheduled elections, members of the Royal Thai Army staged a coup d'état against the government of Prime Minister Thaksin Shinawatra. It is the country's first coup in 15 years, though the practice used to be commonplace, with 17 having occurred between 1932 and 1991.

Junta leader General Sonthi Boonyaratglin announced the abrogation of the constitution, declared martial law, and dissolved Cabinet, Parliament, and the Constitutional Court. He promised that a civilian Prime Minister would be appointed within two weeks, but that a new constitution would be drafted before holding new elections a year in the future.
