= Thaksin Shinawatra =

Prime Minister of Thailand from 2001 to 2006

- ทักษิณ ชินวัตร
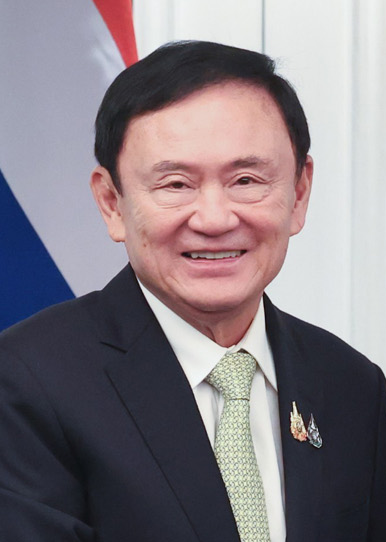
- Thaksin in 2025

23rd Prime Minister of Thailand
- In office 9 February 2001 – 19 September 2006 (Note: During Thaksin's leave of absence from 5 April to 23 May 2006, Chitchai Wannasathit served as acting Prime Minister.)
- Monarch: Bhumibol Adulyadej
- Deputy: See list: Chavalit Yongchaiyudh; Suwit Khunkitti; Dej Boonlang; Pongpol Adireksarn; Pitak Indravithayanond; Somkid Jatusripitak; Korn Dabbaransi; Chaturon Chaisang; Prommin Lertsuridej; Wissanu Krea-ngam; Purachai Piumsomboon; Pokin Palakul; Suchart Chaovisith; Thammarak Isarangkura na Ayudhaya; Wan Muhamad Noor Matha; Suwat Liptapanlop; Phinij Jarusombat; Somsak Thepsuthin; Chitchai Wannasathit; Surakiart Sathirathai; Suriya Juangroongruangkit; Suchai Charoenratanakul
- Preceded by: Chuan Leekpai
- Succeeded by: Sonthi Boonyaratglin (as head of the Council for National Security); Surayud Chulanont

Deputy Prime Minister of Thailand
- In office 13 July 1995 – 24 May 1996
- Prime Minister: Banharn Silpa-archa
- In office 28 May 1996 – 14 August 1996
- Prime Minister: Banharn Silpa-archa
- In office 15 August 1997 – 8 November 1997
- Prime Minister: Chavalit Yongchaiyudh
Ministerial offices
Minister of Foreign Affairs
In office 25 October 1994 – 10 February 1995
Prime Minister	Chuan Leekpai
Preceded by	Prasong Soonsiri
Succeeded by	Krasae Chanawongse
Minister of Education
In office 14 June 2001 – 9 October 2001
Prime Minister	Himself
Preceded by	Kasem Watanachai
Succeeded by	Suwit Khunkitti

Member of the House of Representatives
- In office 6 February 2005 – 8 April 2005
- Constituency: Party-list
- In office 6 January 2001 – 11 March 2001
- Constituency: Party-list

Member of the House of Representatives for Bangkok
- In office 2 July 1995 – 27 September 1996 Serving with Supachai Panitchpakdi, Orathai Kanchanachoosak
- Preceded by: Chamlong Srimuang, Suthep Attathawong, Marut Bunnag
- Succeeded by: Marut Bunnag, Supachai Panitchpakdi, Sukhumbhand Paribatra
- Constituency: Constituency 2

Leader of the Thai Rak Thai Party
- In office 14 July 1998 – 2 October 2006
- Preceded by: Party founded
- Succeeded by: Chaturon Chaisang (acting)

Personal details
- Born: 26 July 1949 (age 77) San Kamphaeng, Chiang Mai, Thailand
- Citizenship: Thailand; Montenegro
- Party: Palang Dharma (1994–1998); Thai Rak Thai (1998–2007)
- Spouse: Potjaman Damapong (m. 1976; div. 2008)
- Children: Panthongtae; Pintongta; Paetongtarn
- Relatives: Shinawatra family
- Education: Royal Police Cadet Academy; Eastern Kentucky University; Sam Houston State University (PhD)
- Police career
- Department: Royal Thai Police
- Branch: Metropolitan Police Bureau
- Service years: 1973–1987
- Rank: Police lieutenant colonel (revoked 2015)

Thaksin Shinawatra (Thai: ทักษิณ ชินวัตร, RTGS: Thaksin Chinnawat [tʰák.sǐn tɕʰīn.nā.wát]; born 26 July 1949) (Note: Teochew 丘達新 Khu Ta̍k-sing; Hakka 丘達新 Hiû Tha̍t-sîn; Montenegrin: Таксин Шинаватра/Taksin Šinavatra) is a Thai former politician, businessman, and police officer who served as the 23rd prime minister of Thailand from 2001 until his overthrow in 2006. Since 2009, he has also been a citizen of Montenegro.

Thaksin founded the mobile phone operator Advanced Info Service (AIS) and the telecommunications conglomerate Shin Corporation in 1987, making him one of the wealthiest individuals in Thailand. He founded the Thai Rak Thai Party (TRT) in 1998 and became prime minister following a landslide election victory in 2001. He was the first democratically elected prime minister of Thailand to serve a full term and was re-elected in 2005.

During his tenure, Thaksin launched a controversial "war on drugs" that resulted in over 2,000 extrajudicial killings, drawing widespread criticism from human rights organizations. His administration implemented major poverty-reduction programs, expanded infrastructure, and introduced universal healthcare coverage, while taking a strong-arm approach to the South Thailand insurgency.

In 2006, the tax-free sale of his family's shares in Shin Corporation sparked mass protests led by the People's Alliance for Democracy ("Yellow Shirts"), accusing him of corruption, abuse of power, and autocratic tendencies. Thaksin called a snap election in 2006 that was boycotted by opposition parties and subsequently invalidated by the Constitutional Court.

Thaksin was deposed in a military coup on 19 September 2006. His party was outlawed, and he was banned from political activity. He spent 15 years in self-imposed exile, during which he was convicted in absentia for abuse of power, and had his police rank revoked.

Despite residing abroad, Thaksin maintained strong political influence through successor parties such as the Pheu Thai Party and the United Front for Democracy Against Dictatorship ("Red Shirts"). His younger sister Yingluck Shinawatra served as prime minister from 2011 to 2014, and his daughter Paetongtarn Shinawatra became prime minister in 2024.

During exile, Thaksin frequently communicated with supporters under the alias "Tony Woodsome" on platforms such as Clubhouse. He returned to Thailand on 22 August 2023, where he was taken into custody before later receiving a royal pardon and parole.

== Heritage and early life ==
Thaksin's great-great-grandfather, Seng Saekhu (Khu Chun Seng 丘春盛), was an ethnic Chinese Hakka immigrant from Fengshun, Guangdong, China, who arrived in Siam in the 1860s and settled in Chiang Mai in 1908. His eldest son, Chiang Saekhu, was born in Chanthaburi in 1890 and married a local named Saeng Samana. Chiang's eldest son, Sak, adopted the Thai surname Shinawatra in 1938 because of the country's pro-Central Thai movement, and the rest of the family also adopted it. Seng Saekhu had made his fortune through tax farming. Chiang Saekhu/Shinawatra later founded Shinawatra Silks and then moved into finance, construction, and property development. Thaksin's father, Loet, was born in Chiang Mai in 1919 and married Yindi Ramingwong. Yindi's father, Charoen Ramingwong (born: Wang Chuan Cheng), was a Chinese Hakka immigrant who married Princess Chanthip na Chiangmai, a minor member of the Lanna (Chiang Mai) royalty.

In 1968, Loet Shinawatra entered politics and became an MP for Chiang Mai. Loet Shinawatra quit politics in 1976. He opened a coffee shop, grew oranges and flowers in Chiang Mai's San Kamphaeng District, and opened two cinemas, a gas station, and a car and motorcycle dealership. By the time Thaksin was born, the Shinawatra family was one of the richest and most influential families in Chiang Mai.

Thaksin Shinawatra was born in San Kamphaeng, Chiang Mai Province, and was raised in a Theravada Buddhist household. He lived in San Kamphaeng until the age of 15 before moving to Chiang Mai to attend Montfort College. At 16, he assisted in managing one of his father's cinemas, gaining early experience in business operations.

Thaksin married Potjaman Damapong in July 1976. They have one son, Panthongtae and two daughters, Pinthongtha and Paethongtarn. They divorced in 2008. Thaksin's youngest sister, Yingluck Shinawatra (Thai: ยิ่งลักษณ์ ชินวัตร; RTGS: yinglak chinnawat), is said to have entered politics in 2011 at her brother's request as leader of the pro-Thaksin Pheu Thai Party. She was later elected prime minister on 3 July 2011. Thaksin received a doctorate in criminology at Sam Houston State University. Thaksin lectured at the Faculty of Social Sciences and Humanities of Mahidol University in 1979.

== Police career ==
Thaksin was a member of the 10th class of the Armed Forces Academies Preparatory School, and was then admitted to the Thai Police Cadet Academy. Graduating in 1973, he joined the Royal Thai Police. He received a master's degree in criminal justice from Eastern Kentucky University in the United States in 1975, and three years later was awarded a doctorate in criminal justice at Sam Houston State University in Huntsville, Texas.

Returning to Thailand, he reached the position of Deputy Superintendent of the Policy and Planning Sub-division, General Staff Division, Metropolitan Police Bureau, before resigning his commission in 1987 as a Police Lieutenant Colonel and leaving the police. His former wife, Potjaman Damapong, is the sister of Police General Priewpan Damapong and now uses her mother's maiden name.

He was a former university lecturer at the Royal Police Cadet Academy in 1975–1976.

Thaksin's police lieutenant colonel rank was revoked in September 2015.

== Business career ==
=== Early ventures ===
Thaksin and his wife began several businesses while he was still in the police, including a silk shop, a cinema, and an apartment building. All were failures which left him over 50 million baht in debt, (£1 million). In 1982, he established ICSI. Using his police contacts, he leased computers to government agencies with modest success. However, later ventures in security systems (SOS) and public bus radio services (Bus Sound) all failed. In April 1986, he founded Advanced Info Service (AIS), which started as a computer rental business.

In 1987 Thaksin resigned from the police. He then marketed a romance drama called Baan Sai Thong, which became a popular success in theatres. In 1988, he joined Pacific Telesis to operate and market the PacLink pager service, a modest success, though Thaksin later sold his shares to establish his own paging company.

In 1989, he launched IBC, a cable television company. At that time, Thaksin had a good relationship with Chalerm Yoobumrung, the minister of the Prime Minister's Office, who was in charge of Thai press and media. It is a question whether Chalerm granted the right to Thaksin to establish IBC to benefit his close friend, seeing that the project had been denied by the previous administration. However, it turned out to be a money loser and he eventually merged the company with the CP Group's UTV.

In 1989, Thaksin established a data networking service, Shinawatra DataCom, today known as Advanced Data Network and owned by AIS and TOT. Many of Thaksin's businesses were later consolidated as Shin Corporation.

=== Advanced Info Service and later ventures ===
Advanced Info Service (AIS) was given a monopoly contract by Thaksin's military contacts in 1986 and used the GSM-900 frequency band. AIS grew rapidly and became the largest mobile phone operator in Thailand.

The Shinawatra Computer and Communications Group was founded in 1987 and listed in 1990.

In 1990, Thaksin founded Shinawatra Satellite, which has developed and operated four Thaicom communications satellites.

In 1999, the Shinawatra family spent some one billion baht establishing Shinawatra University in Pathum Thani. It offers international programs in engineering, architecture, and business management, though it ranks quite low internationally.

In 2000, Thaksin acquired the ailing iTV television station from the Crown Property Bureau, Nation Multimedia Group, and Siam Commercial Bank.

== Entry into politics ==
=== Political career ===
Thaksin entered politics in late 1994 through Chamlong Srimuang, who had just reclaimed the position of Palang Dharma Party (PDP) leader from Boonchu Rojanastien. In a subsequent purge of Boonchu-affiliated PDP cabinet ministers, Thaksin was appointed foreign minister in December 1994, replacing Prasong Soonsiri. Thaksin left Palang Dharma along with many of its MPs in 1996, and founded the populist Thai Rak Thai (TRT) party in 1998. After a historic election victory in 2001, he became prime minister, the country's first to serve a full term.

Thaksin introduced a range of policies to alleviate rural poverty. Highly popular, they helped reduce poverty by half in four years. He launched the country's first universal healthcare program, the 30-baht scheme, as well as a notorious drug suppression campaign. Thaksin embarked on a massive program of infrastructure investment, including roads, public transit, and Suvarnabhumi Airport. Nevertheless, public sector debt fell from 57 percent of GDP in January 2001 to 41 percent in September 2006. Levels of corruption were perceived to have fallen, with Transparency International's Corruption Perceptions Index improving from 3.2 to 3.8 between 2001 and 2005. The Thai Rak Thai party won in a landslide in the 2005 general election, which had the highest voter turnout in Thai history.

Twelve years later, after Thaksin was removed from power, Chamlong Srimuang expressed regret at getting "such a corrupt person" into politics. The PDP soon withdrew from the government over the Sor Por Kor 4-01 land reform corruption scandal, causing the government of Chuan Leekpai to collapse.

=== PDP leader and Deputy Prime Minister under Banharn ===
Chamlong, strongly criticised for mishandling internal PDP politics in the last days of the Chuan-government, retired from politics and hand-picked Thaksin as new PDP leader. Thaksin ran for election for the first time for the constitutional tribunal and lost.

Thaksin joined the government of Banharn Silpa-Archa and was appointed Deputy Prime Minister in charge of Bangkok traffic. In May 1996, he and four other PDP ministers quit the Banharn Cabinet (while retaining their MP seats), prompting a Cabinet reshuffle. Many have claimed that Thaksin's move was designed to help give Chamlong Srimuang a boost in the June 1996 Bangkok Governor elections, which Chamlong returned from retirement to contest. But Chamlong lost to Bhichit Rattakul, an independent.

Chamlong's failure to buttress the PDP's failing power base in Bangkok amplified divisions in the PDP, particularly between Chamlong's "temple" faction and Thaksin's. Soon afterwards, Chamlong announced he was retiring again from politics.

Thaksin and the PDP pulled out of the Banharn-government in August 1996. In a subsequent no-confidence debate, the PDP gave evidence against the Banharn government, and in September 1996 Banharn dissolved Parliament.

Thaksin announced he would not run in the subsequent November 1996 elections but would remain as leader of the PDP. It suffered a fatal defeat in the elections, winning only one seat, and soon imploded, with most members resigning.

=== Deputy Prime Minister under Chavalit ===
On 15 August 1997, Thaksin became Deputy Prime Minister in Chavalit Yongchaiyudh's government, after the Thai baht was floated and devalued on 2 July 1997, sparking the Asian financial crisis. He held the position for only three months, leaving on 14 November when Chavalit resigned.

During a censure debate on 27 September 1997, Democrat Suthep Thaugsuban accused Thaksin of profiting from insider information about the government's decision to float the baht, but the next Democrat party-led government did not investigate the accusations.

During this period, Thaksin also served on the Asia Advisory Board of the Washington, D.C.–based Carlyle Group until he resigned upon becoming prime minister in 2001.

=== The Thai Rak Thai Party and the 2001 elections ===
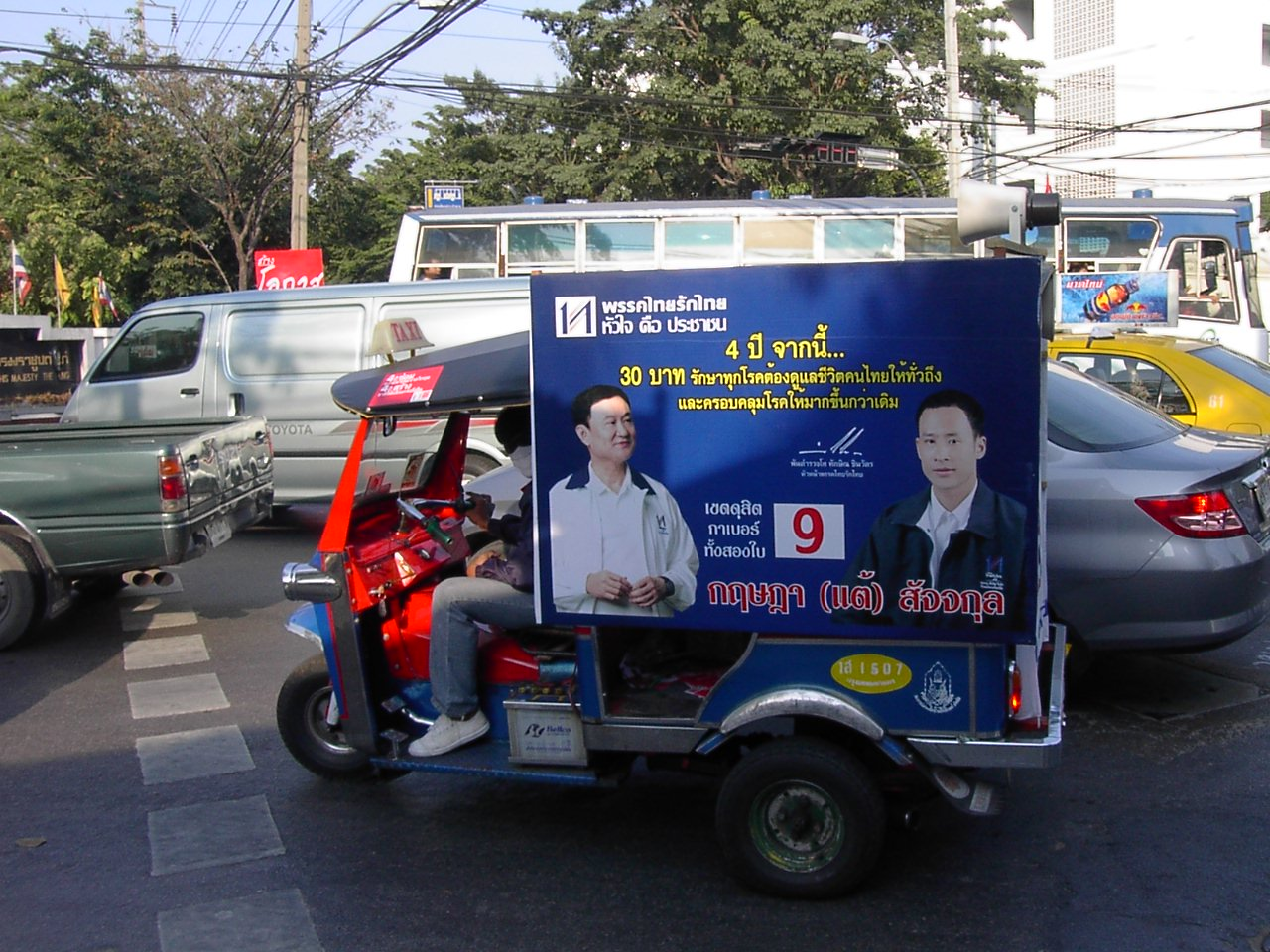
Campaign sign of Thai Rak Thai Party show the leadership of Thaksin as Party Leader

Thaksin founded the Thai Rak Thai (TRT) ('Thais Love Thais') party in 1998 along with Somkid Jatusripitak, PDP ally Sudarat Keyuraphan, Purachai Piumsomboon, and 19 others.

With a populist platform often attributed to Somkid, TRT promised universal access to healthcare, a three-year debt moratorium for farmers, and one million baht locally managed development funds for all Thai villages.

After Prime Minister Chuan Leekpai dissolved parliament in November 2000, TRT won a sweeping victory in the January 2001 elections, the first held under the Constitution of 1997. At the time, some academics called it the most open, corruption-free election in Thai history. Thai Rak Thai won 248 parliamentary seats (more than any other party previously) and needed only three more seats to form a government. Nonetheless, Thaksin opted for a broad coalition to gain total control and avoid a vote of no confidence, with the Chart Thai Party (41 seats) and the New Aspiration Party (36 seats), while absorbing the smaller Seritham Party (14 seats). Thaksin became Prime Minister of Thailand on 9 February 2001.

==== Indictment of Thaksin for hiding his wealth ====
Thailand's National Counter Corruption Commission (NCCC) submitted an indictment to the Constitutional Court accusing Thaksin Shinawatra, the prime minister-in-waiting at the time, for failing to disclose assets worth about 2.37 billion baht ($56 million) while he was deputy prime minister in 1997 and a year afterward. If found guilty, Thaksin could be banned from political office for five years. This case is known as the "stock hiding case" because the Constitution prohibits politicians and their spouses from holding shares in private companies as per the law. However, Thaksin transferred the shares he owned to his domestic staff and other nominees in order to conceal his ownership.

According to his own testament in the constitutional court, his reasons for failing to reveal his complete asset include: (1) the constitution does not define the term "personal property", (2) the accounting explanation is not clear, (3) not showing the property using another person's name as a substitute, which was not previously required to be shown, is not considered a violation, (4) not intentionally not showing the list of property using another person's name, (5) it is not his responsibility to submit the accounting before the announcement of the use of the organic law on the Prevention and Suppression of Corruption Act, B.E. 2542 (A.D. 1999), which was just announced on November 18, B.E. 2542 (A.D. 1999) and (6) in the confidential letter dated November 14, 24, and 30th, B.E. 2543 (A.D. 2000) to the chairman of the Audit Committee, the accused (Thaksin Shinawatra) had already explained the list of assets and debts and the reasons why they were not shown in the accounting, considering the notification of additional asset lists as part of the three times submitted accounting.

While Klanarong Jantik, the Secretary-General of the National Anti-Corruption Commission-NACC, argued in the court that (1) although the constitution does not define the term "personal property", but it is a common sense understanding, (2) the accounting explanation may have minor changes but the important information remains unchanged and has been edited to make it clearer, (3) It is not shown that there have been any instances where a minister or individual who submitted the accounting has stated that they did not show the asset list because they used another person's name as a substitute, citing that they did not understand the accounting explanation and (4) although the organic law on the Prevention and Suppression of Corruption Act, B.E. 2542 (A.D. 1999) was announced on November 18, B.E. 2542 (A.D. 1999), the accused has the responsibility to submit the accounting according to the current constitution from the day it is mandated, which is October 11, B.E. 2540 (A.D. 1997).

Later, the Constitutional Court ruled 8 to 7 that Thaksin Shinawatra did not have any intention in the matter. This ruling may have been influenced by public pressure against the Constitutional Court because at the time, Thaksin was very popular and some believed he should have been given the opportunity to govern the country. However, there is still a part of society that is skeptical of the court's decision and sees Thaksin as disrupting the justice process, leading to the complaint and removal of four Constitutional Court judges.

In 2011, the Truth for Reconciliation Commission of Thailand released a final report after two years of work, stating that all political crises were caused by the "Thaksin stock hiding case" in which the Constitutional Court acted unlawfully. Seven judges of the Constitutional Court ruled that Thaksin Shinawatra was guilty of the charges, while six other judges ruled that he was not guilty. However, the Constitutional Court then included the votes of the two judges who had ruled that the case was not within their jurisdiction, but had not ruled on the substance of the case, and added them to the votes of the six judges who had ruled that Thaksin was not guilty. This resulted in a ruling of 8 to 7 in favor of Thaksin, which was perceived as a violation of the law and led to public mistrust of the judicial process in Thailand.

== Prime Minister of Thailand (2001–2006) ==
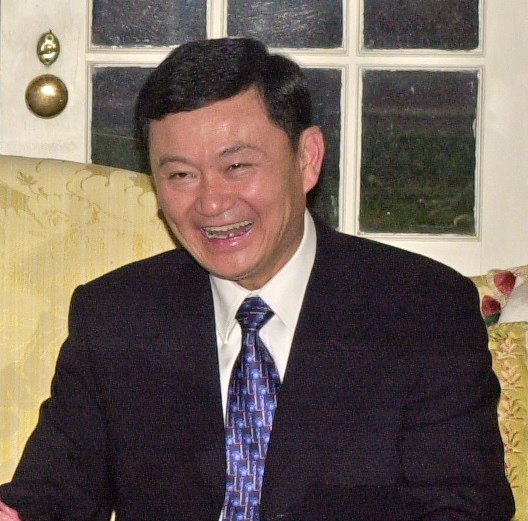
Thaksin meeting Donald Evans in December 2001

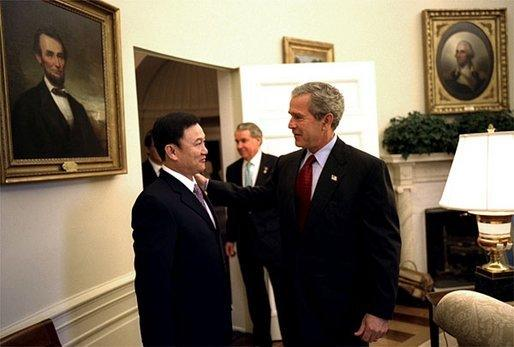
U.S. president George W. Bush meets with Prime Minister Thaksin Shinawatra of Thailand in the Oval Office Tuesday, June 10, 2003

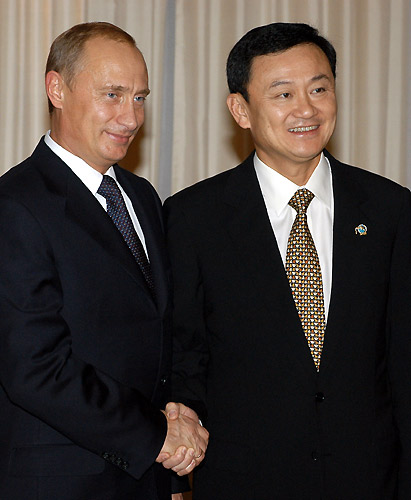
Thaksin in a meeting with the president of Russia, Vladimir Putin, in October 2003

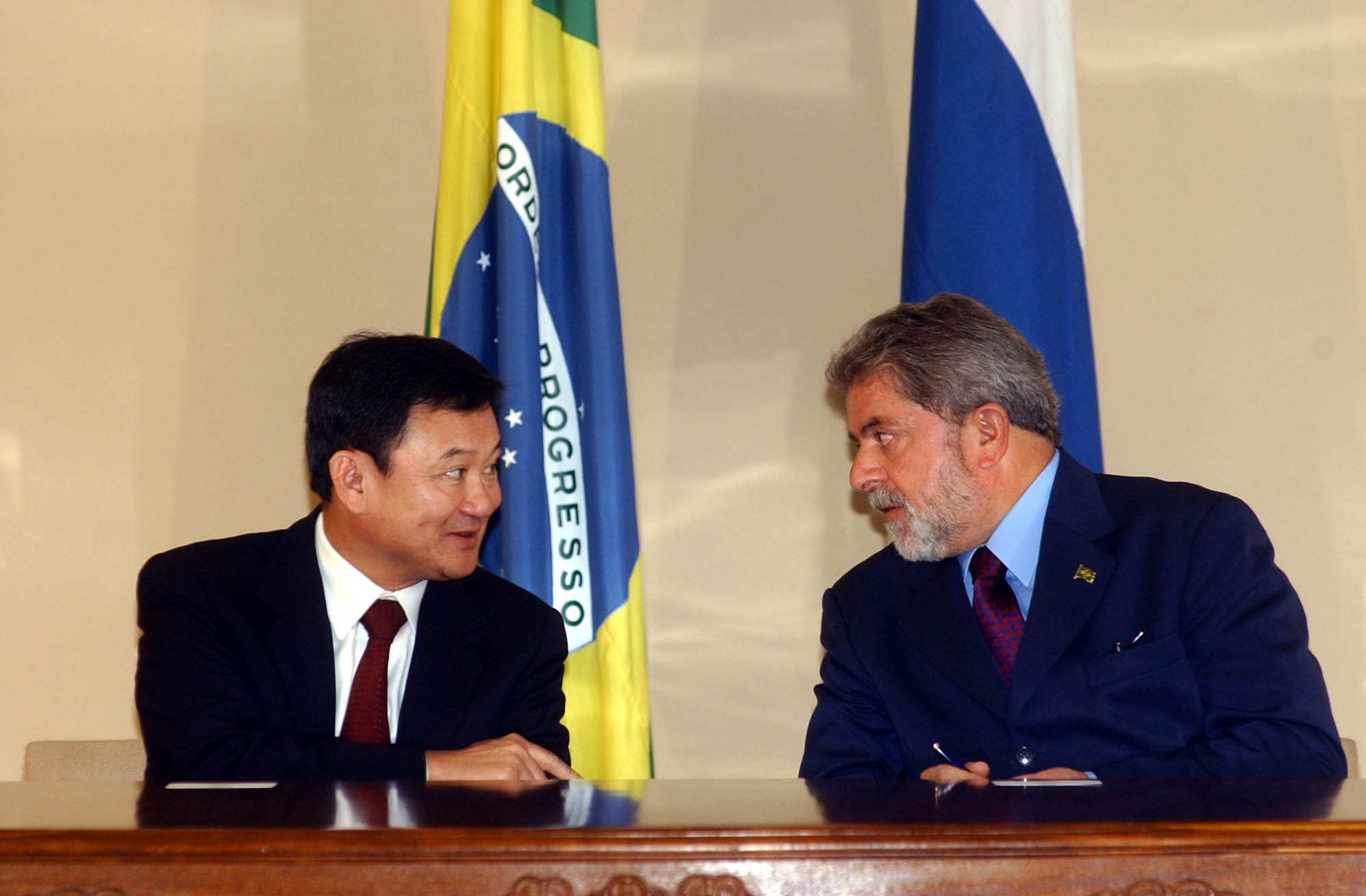
Thaksin in a meeting with the president of Brazil, Luiz Inácio Lula da Silva, 2004

Thaksin Shinawatra was the first prime minister of Thailand to complete a full term in office, and his rule is generally agreed to have been one of the most distinctive in the country's modern history. He initiated many eye-catching policies that distinguished him from his predecessors. They affected the economy, public health, education, energy, social order, drug suppression and international relations. He gained one re-election victory.

Thaksin's most effective policies were reducing rural poverty and the introduction of universal healthcare, allowing him to gather the hitherto-neglected support of the rural poor, especially in the populous northeast.

His cabinet consisted of a broad coalition of academics, former student leaders, and former leaders of the Palang Dharma Party, including Prommin Lertsuridej, Chaturon Chaisang, Prapat Panyachatraksa, Surapong Suebwonglee, Somkid Jatusripitak, Surakiart Sathirathai, and Sudarat Keyuraphan. Traditional regional power brokers also flocked to his government.

However, his government was increasingly accused of dictatorship, demagogy, corruption, conflicts of interest, human rights offences, acting undiplomatically, using legal loopholes and displaying hostility towards a free press. A highly controversial leader, he has also been the target of numerous allegations of lèse majesté, treason, usurping religious and royal authority, selling assets to international investors, and religious desecration.

=== Economic policies ===
Thaksin's government designed its policies to appeal to the rural majority, initiating programs like village-managed microcredit development funds, low-interest agricultural loans, direct injections of cash into village development funds (the SML scheme), infrastructure development, and the One Tambon One Product (OTOP) rural, small, and medium enterprise development program.

Thaksin's economic policies helped Thailand recover from the 1997 Asian financial crisis and substantially reduce poverty. GDP grew from 4.9 trillion baht in 2001 to 7.1 trillion baht in 2006. Thailand repaid its debts to the International Monetary Fund two years ahead of schedule.

Income in the northeast, the poorest part of the country, rose by 46 percent from 2001 to 2006. Nationwide poverty fell from 21.3 to 11.3 percent. Thailand's Gini coefficient, a measure of income inequality, fell from .525 in 2000 to .499 in 2004 (it had risen from 1996 to 2000). The Stock Exchange of Thailand outperformed other markets in the region. After facing fiscal deficits in 2001 and 2002, Thaksin balanced the national budget, producing comfortable fiscal surpluses for 2003 to 2005. Despite a massive program of infrastructure investments, a balanced budget was projected for 2007. Public sector debt fell from 57 percent of GDP in January 2001 to 41 percent in September 2006. Foreign exchange reserves doubled from US$30 billion in 2001 to US$64 billion in 2006.

Critics say Thaksinomics is little more than a Keynesian-style economic stimulus policy re-branded. Others claimed that the policies got the rural poor "hooked on Thaksin's hand-outs."

Thaksin helped legalise Thailand's massive underground lottery system numbers game (Thai: หวย) to be run by the Government Lottery Office. Lottery sales of approximately 70 billion baht (US$2 billion) were used for social projects, including the "One District, One Scholarship" program. The Thaksin government also privatised MCOT, a large television and radio broadcaster.

After the 2006 coup, many of Thaksin's economic policies were ended, the OTOP program was rebranded, the Government Lottery Office's program was deemed illegal, and the government nationalised several media outlets and energy companies. However, economists from the Thailand Development Research Institute (TDRI) published a report indicating that many of the populist policies had not boosted the economy and some were by coincidence.

=== Educational policies ===
According to World Bank Thailand has recentralized rather than decentralized during his administration.

One of Thaksin's educational reforms was school decentralisation, as mandated by the 1997 Constitution. It was to delegate school management from the over-centralized and bureaucratised Ministry of Education to Tambon Administrative Organizations (TAOs), but met with massive widespread opposition from Thailand's 700,000 teachers, who would be deprived of their status as civil servants. Teachers also feared that TAOs lacked the ability to manage schools. In the face of massive teacher protests and several threats of school closure, Thaksin compromised and gave teachers whose schools were transferred to TAO management two years to transfer to other schools.

Other intended policy changes included learning reform and related curricular decentralisation, mostly through greater use of holistic education and less use of rote learning.

To increase access to universities by lower income people, Thaksin initiated the Student Loan Fund (SLF) and Income Contingency Loan (ICL) programs. He initiated the ICL program to increase access to higher education, whereby needy students could secure a loan to support their studies from vocational to university levels. Thai banks had traditionally not given educational loans. The ICL, however, required recipients to start repayments when their salaries reached 16,000 baht a month, with interest equivalent to inflation from the day the loan was granted. The SLF had an eligibility limit on family income, but interest was 1 per cent starting a year after graduation. The programs were merged and the income limit modified after Thaksin's government was overthrown.

Thaksin was one of the first supporters of Nicholas Negroponte's One Laptop Per Child (OLPC) project, with the Thai Ministry of Education committing to purchase 600,000 units. The junta later cancelled the project.

Thaksin also initiated the controversial "One District, One Dream School" project, aimed at developing the quality of schools to ensure that every district had at least one high-quality school. It was criticised, with claims that the only beneficiaries were Thaksin and companies selling computers and educational equipment. Many schools fell deeply into debt in implementing the project, receiving inadequate financial support from the central government.

In addition, he altered the state university entrance system, which had relied exclusively on nationally standardised exams. Thaksin pushed for greater weighting of senior high-school grades in the hope of focusing students on classroom learning rather than private entrance exam tutoring.

=== Healthcare policies ===
Thaksin initiated two key healthcare policies: subsidised universal health care (UHC) in 2002 and low-cost universal access to anti-retroviral HIV medication (ARVs). Thaksin's 30 baht per visit UHC program won the praise of the general public, but was criticised by many physicians and officials. Prior to the program's introduction, a large portion of the population had no health insurance and only limited access to healthcare. The program helped increase healthcare access from 76% of the population to 96%. At its outset, UHC was reviled as a "populist" policy. Post-coup public health minister Mongkol Na Songkhla called the 30 baht program a "marketing gimmick". Nearly half of UHC patients were dissatisfied with the treatment they received. The program has downsides: excessive workloads for health care providers, crowded waiting rooms, and insufficient time spent diagnosing each patient, and costs have tripled from 56 million baht in 2006 to 166 million baht in 2019, but still remain below one percent of GDP.

=== The War on Drugs ===
On 14 January 2003, Thaksin launched a campaign to rid "every square inch of the country" of drugs in three months. It consisted of changing the punishment policy for drug addicts, setting provincial arrest and seizure targets including "blacklists", awarding government officials for achieving targets and threatening punishment for those who failed to make the quota, targeting dealers, and "ruthless" implementation. In the first three months, Human Rights Watch (HRW) claimed that 2,275 people were extrajudicially executed. However, a forensic examination of the 2,275 figure in 2007 by Bangkok Pundit writing for the now defunct Asian Correspondent found that HRW's source for the 2,275 figure was Agence France-Presse (AFP). It further found that the figure of 2,275 was the total number of people killed nationwide from the start of the "war", published in police figures released in mid-April 2023, with AFP itself acknowledging "it is not known how many were drug-related killings" Compounding the false narrative, AFP then went on to later attribute the 2,275 figure to HRW in future reports. In December 2003 Thailand's police chief, Police General Sant Sarutanond, told a Bangkok media conference that an internal investigation had found that 72 people died as a result of "extra-judicial killings". The BBC's use of the word extra-judicial killing it is a translation of วิสามัญฆาตกรรม which actually equates to justifiable homicide. The government claimed that only around 50 of the deaths were at the hands of the police, the rest being drug traffickers who were being silenced by their dealers and their dealers' dealers. Human rights critics claimed a large number were extrajudicially executed. The majority of these individuals were listed on the government's blacklist, but there is no evidence to suggest that they were actually involved in the drug trade. The blacklist was unreliable, with some drug dealers not being listed and many individuals who were listed having no involvement in the drug trade. The government encouraged community members to report drug users and dealers to authorities, who would then put the names in a box for the government to review. This led to confusion and mistakes, including the inclusion of innocent individuals on the blacklist. There were also instances of people using the blacklist for revenge against rivals.

In a 2003 birthday address, King Bhumibol subtly criticised the handling of the war on drugs by the government, hinting at a misplacement of accountability for its casualties onto him, despite constitutional provisions that exempt the monarch from governmental responsibilities. The King expressed concern over the broader accountability within the country, emphasising the challenge of identifying and distinguishing the casualties caused by state actions and others. The speech delicately pointed out the legal and moral responsibilities of the government officials in managing national crises.

Bhumibol also asked the commander of the police to investigate the killings. Police Commander Sant Sarutanond reopened investigations into the deaths, and again claimed that few of the deaths were at the hands of the police.

The war on drugs was widely criticised by the international community. Thaksin requested that the UN Commission on Human Rights send a special envoy to evaluate the situation, but said in an interview, "The United Nations is not my father. I am not worried about any UN visit to Thailand on this issue."

After the 2006 coup, the military junta appointed a committee to investigate the anti-drug campaign. Former attorney general Kanit Na Nakorn led the committee. Concerning the committee's results The Economist reported in January 2008: "Over half of those killed in 2003 had no links to the drugs trade. The panel blamed the violence on a government 'shoot-to-kill' policy based on flawed blacklists. But far from leading to the prosecutions of those involved, its findings have been buried. The outgoing interim prime minister, Surayud Chulanont, took office vowing to right Mr Thaksin's wrongs. Yet this week he said there was insufficient evidence to take legal action over the killings. It is easy to see why the tide has turned. Sunai Phasuk, a researcher for Human Rights Watch, a lobbying group, says that the panel's original report named the politicians who egged on the gunmen. But after the PPP won last month's elections, those names were omitted."

While he was opposition leader, Abhisit Vejjajiva accused Thaksin of crimes against humanity for his alleged role in the campaign. After being appointed prime minister, Abhisit opened an investigation into the killings, claiming that a successful probe could lead to prosecution by the International Criminal Court. Former attorney-general Kampee Kaewcharoen led the investigation and the investigation committee was approved by Abhisit's Cabinet. Abhisit denied that the probe was politically motivated. Witnesses and victims were urged to report to the Department of Special Investigation, which operated directly under Abhisit's control.

=== Energy policies ===
In energy policy, the Thaksin government continued the Chuan Leekpai government's privatisation agenda, but with important changes. Whereas the Chuan government's post-Asian financial crisis policies sought economic efficiency through industry fragmentation and wholesale power pool competition, Thaksin's policies aimed to create national champions that could reliably support stronger economic growth and become important players in regional energy markets. Thaksin also initiated a policy to encourage renewable energy and energy conservation. Many Thaksin-era energy policies were reversed following the 2006 coup.

=== South Thailand insurgency ===
A resurgence in violence began in 2001 in the three southernmost provinces of Thailand with their Muslim, ethnic Malay majority. There is much controversy about the causes of this escalation. Attacks after 2001 concentrated on police, the military, and schools, but civilians (including Buddhist monks) are also regular targets. Thaksin was widely criticised for his management of the situation.

Of three key controversial incidents, the first was the Army's storming of the Krue Se Mosque, where protesters had holed up and were killed.

The second, in October 2004, was the killing of 84 Muslim demonstrators at Tak Bai, when the Army broke up a peaceful protest. Hundreds of detainees were forced at gunpoint to lie shackled and prone in Army trucks, stacked like cordwood. The trucks were delayed from moving to the detainment area for hours. The 84 victims were reported to have been asphyxiated, crushed or died of overheating. The precise nature and cause of death have been subject to controversy and doubt because of lack of transparency and absence of depth in investigations made. There are other reports of many more deaths but these have not been substantiated.

In a third incident, Muslim lawyer Somchai Neelapaijit disappeared, allegedly abducted and killed by police for his role in defending alleged insurgents who claimed to have been tortured. Despite witness testimony and forensic evidence during the court of police investigations and court trials, all allegations against police said to be involved were dropped and the enforced disappearance case closed.

Thaksin announced an escalation of military and police activity in the region. In July 2005, Thaksin enacted an Emergency Decree to manage the three troubled provinces. Several human rights organisations expressed their concerns that the decree might be used to violate civil liberties.

In March 2005, Thaksin established the National Reconciliation Commission, chaired by former prime minister Anand Panyarachun to oversee efforts to bring peace to the troubled South. In its final report in June 2006, the commission proposed introducing elements of Islamic law and making Pattani-Malay (Yawi) an official language in the region along with Thai. The Thaksin administration assigned a government committee to study the report, but nothing came of it.

Thaksin blamed Malaysia's jungle that has occasionally been used to train Islamic militants to cause violence in the south and Indonesia for being an inspiration to the militants.

=== Administrative reform ===
One of the most visible of Thaksin's administrative reforms was the restructuring of government department and ministries, labelled the "big bang." It was hailed as a "historic breakthrough" and "the first major reorganization of ministries since King Chulalongkorn set up Thailand's modern system of departmental government in 1897." Plans had been studied for years to loosen perceived rigidities and inertia of the old system but were not implemented until the Thaksin government. MCOT : TNA English News :

The restructuring was designed to streamline the bureaucracy and focus it on performance and results. New ministries were carved out in Social and Human Security Development, Tourism and Sports, Natural Resources and Environment, Information and Communication Technology, and Culture.

Thaksin transformed the role of provincial governors to that of active policy managers. Historically, central government ministries operated in the provinces through field offices headed by senior officials who reported back to Bangkok, while the Interior Ministry appointed provincial governors whose role was largely ceremonial.

A key component of Thaksin's administrative reform policy, the "CEO-governors" epitomised what was called his "transformation of the operating style of the traditional bureaucracy into a more results-oriented instrument that would be responsive." Piloted in 2001 and introduced in all provinces in October 2003, CEO-governors were put in charge of planning and co-ordinating provincial development and became accountable for overall provincial affairs. The "CEO governors" were assisted by "provincial CFOs" from the Ministry of Finance who reported directly to each governor. Governors were authorised to raise funds by issuing bonds and were given an intensive training course.

The CEO-governors of all 75 provinces at that time came from the appointment of the Minister of Interior Affairs and had greater authority in managing people and money. There was even a special budget allocated, called the "CEO-governor budget," which amounted to tens of million baht. In reality, it was found that this budget was managed and shared among the local members of parliament and aimed at achieving political goals, leading to criticism that it was a budget used to gain support for Thaksin government. It was even accused by academics of being a "hired vision writer" for the government.

After the coup, Prime Minister Surayud Chulanont, drafted the royal decree on the management and preparation of budget plans for the development of provincial and district groups starting in 2008. The "CEO-governor budget" was eliminated and thereby preventing the local members of the parliament from spending the budget to gain votes.

The Thaksin era also saw the opening of a number of government one-stop service centres to reduce red tape for anything from investment to utilities and ID-card processing.

=== Foreign policies ===
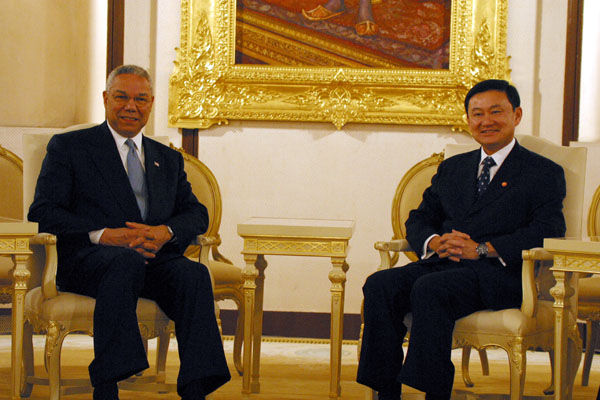
U.S. secretary of state Colin Powell and Thailand Prime Minister Thaksin Shinawatra at Government House in 2002

Thaksin initiated negotiations for several free trade agreements with China, Australia, Bahrain, India, and the US. The latter especially was criticised, with claims that high-cost Thai industries could be wiped out.

Thailand joined the US-led invasion of Iraq, sending a 423-strong humanitarian contingent. It withdrew its troops on 10 September 2004. Two Thai soldiers died in Iraq in an insurgent attack.

Thaksin announced that Thailand would forsake foreign aid, and work with donor countries to assist in the development of neighbours in the Greater Mekong Sub-region.

Thaksin was repeatedly attacked for acting undiplomatically with foreign leaders and the international community. Besides his famous swipe at the UN (see The 'war on drugs' above), there were also allegations of gaffes at international meetings.

Thaksin was keen to position Thailand as a regional leader, initiating various development projects in poorer neighbouring countries like Laos. More controversially, he established close, friendly ties with the Burmese dictatorship, including extending the impoverished country a 4 billion baht credit line so it could conclude a satellite telecom deal with his family business.

Thaksin energetically supported his former foreign minister Surakiart Sathirathai's somewhat improbable campaign to become Secretary-General of the United Nations.

=== Suvarnabhumi Airport ===
Despite debate and long abandonment of the plan due to the stability of the ground for the location of the airport, the Thaksin government pushed to complete the construction of the new Suvarnabhumi International Airport. The airport was opened a week after Thaksin's government was overthrown.

Members of Thaksin's government were accused of corruption in the Suvarnabhumi Airport project. These allegations were used by the military junta to justify the 2006 coup. The junta initiated several investigations into the airport. Nevertheless, investigative panels found that damage to the airport was "minute" and "common." The cost of repairing the damage was estimated at less than one percent of the total airport cost. The junta was accused by its opponents of delaying airport repairs and intensifying the airport's problems to pin further blame on the Thaksin government.

=== Criticism ===
==== Corruption ====
Thaksin was accused of "policy corruption", such as infrastructure and liberalisation policies that, while legal "...abuse the public's interest,..." Supannee Chai-amporn and Sirinthip Arun-rue of the National Institute of Development Administration (NIDA) claimed that policy corruption caused the state to spend 5 to 30 percent more than it otherwise should have spent, costing the state an additional 400 billion baht. Thaksin critics point to more examples of corruption: the Thailand Board of Investment's (BOI) granting tax breaks worth a total of 16.4 billion baht to Shin Satellite for its iPSTAR project in 2003, and the Transport Ministry's decision the same year to abolish the minimum air fare of 3.8 baht per kilometre when Shin Corporation was about to consummate a joint venture with low-cost carrier AirAsia.

After the 2006 coup, the military junta-appointed Assets Examination Committee froze Thaksin's assets based on charges of policy corruption.

Thaksin denied the allegations. "They just made up a beautiful term to use against me. There's no such thing in this government. Our policies only serve the interests of the majority of the people", he said. From 2002 to 2006, the stock price of Shin Corporation increased from 38 to 104 baht, up 173 percent, while the stock price of Shin Satellite fell. In the same period, the Stock Exchange of Thailand (SET) index rose 161 per cent, and the price of other major SET blue chip companies increased vastly more. Industry deregulation caused the market share of AIS to fall from 68 percent to 53 percent.

Transparency International reported that Thailand's reputation for transparency among business executives improved somewhat during the years of the Thaksin government. In 2001, Thailand's Corruption Perceptions Index (CPI) score was 3.2 (ranked 61), whilst in 2005, the CPI was 3.8 (ranked 59).

A study of governance indicators worldwide by the World Bank gave Thailand a lower score on "control of corruption" from 2002 to 2005 under Thaksin when compared to the Democrat-led government of 1998–2000.

In 2008 Thaksin was sentenced to two years' imprisonment in absentia over a corrupt land deal. In a ruling that made him the first Thai politician ever to be convicted of corruption committed while prime minister, Thaksin was found to have violated conflict of interest rules in helping his wife buy land from a state agency at a seemingly low price.

==== Other charges ====
Immediately after the events of March 2010, Abhisit Vejjajiva stated that he would talk to the red shirt leadership, but not to Thaksin. He criticised Thaksin's wealth and extravagance, contrasting the alleged opulence of the premier's house and the humbler, agrarian roots of many of his supporters. Shortly after, he condemned his opponent's self-proclaimed affinity with ordinary people, the "phrai" (Thai: ไพร่), arguing that Thaksin was far closer to the "ammart", or the traditional elites in Thailand's army, bureaucracy, and political parties.

Thaksin's government was accused of exerting political influence in its crackdown on unlicensed community radio stations, and Thaksin brought defamation lawsuits against critical journalists.

== Political crisis of 2005–2006 ==
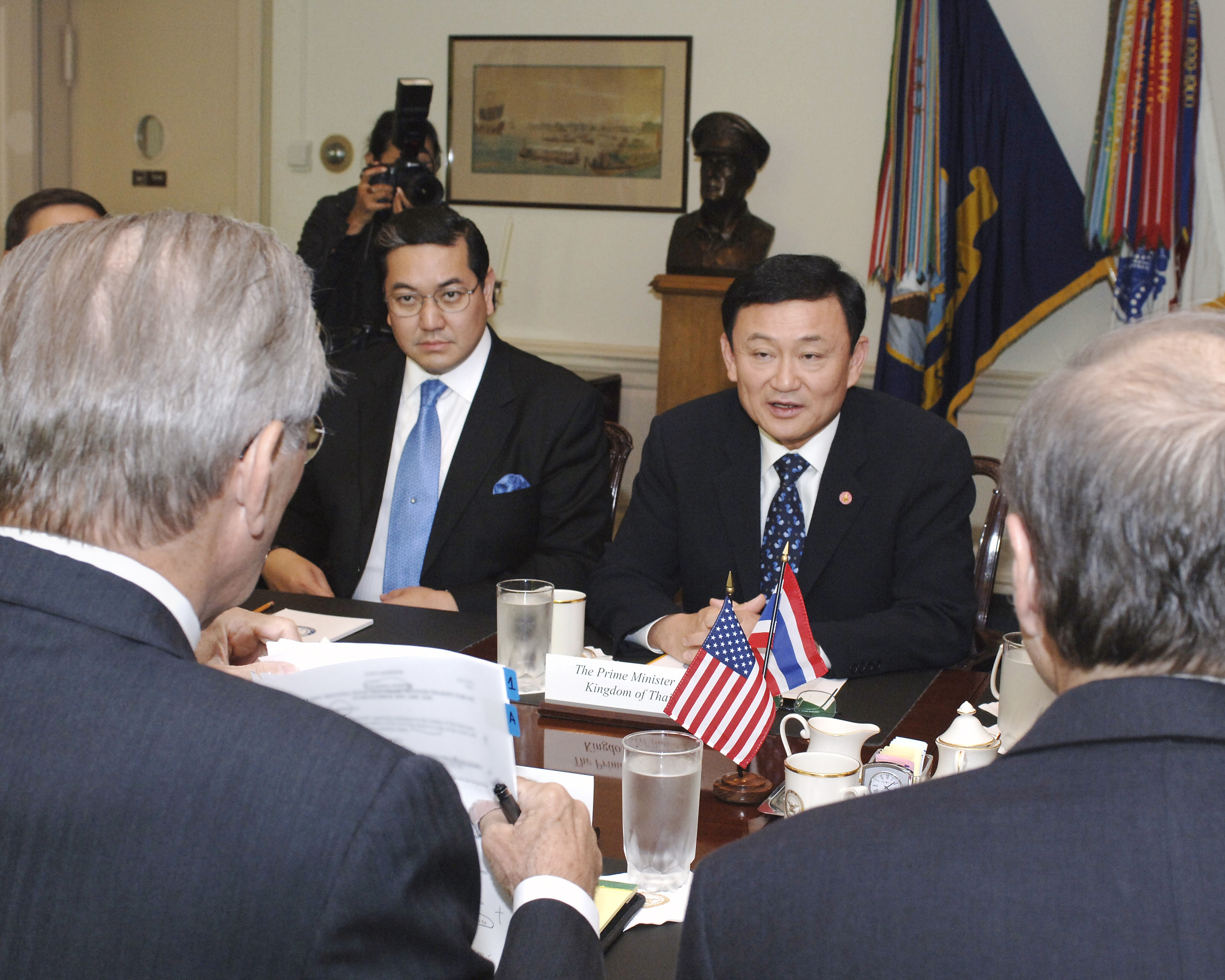
Prime Minister Thaksin Shinawatra and Deputy Prime Minister Surakiart Sathirathai, 19 September 2005

=== 2005 re-election ===
Under the slogans "Four Years of Repair – Four years of Reconstruction" and "Building Opportunities", Thaksin and the TRT won landslide victories in February 2005 elections, winning 374 of 500 seats in parliament. The election had the highest voter turnout in Thai history. But his second term was soon beset by protests, with claims that he presided over a "parliamentary dictatorship".

The political crisis was catalysed by accusations published by media mogul and popular talk show host Sondhi Limthongkul, a former Thaksin supporter who had broken with him. These included accusations that Thaksin:

- Restricted press freedom by suing Sondhi after he printed a sermon by a Luang Ta Maha Bua, a controversial monk.
- Masterminded the desecration of the famous Erawan Shrine

=== Sale of Shin Corporation ===
On 23 January 2006, the Shinawatra family sold their entire stake in Shin Corporation to Temasek Holdings. The Shinawatra and Damapong families netted about 73 billion baht (about US$1.88 billion) tax-free from the sale, using a regulation that made individuals who sell shares on the stock exchange exempt from capital gains tax. Thaksin was the target of accusations of corruption for selling forbidden national assets such as national utility company to a foreign entity in exchange for personal profits and kickbacks. Thai laws at the time disallowed the sale of integral assets of national importance to the public or to any foreign entity, but Thaksin amended the laws to allow such sale.

Protests followed the Shin Corporation sale, led by the People's Alliance for Democracy (PAD), whose leaders included Chamlong and Sondhi. Numbers soon swelled to tens of thousands occupying the area around Government House in Bangkok.

=== House dissolution and election ===
Thaksin announced the dissolution of parliament on 24 February 2006. General elections were scheduled for 2 April.

Thaksin was attacked for calling for snap elections, which in effect prevented any member of parliament from changing parties. In an editorial, The Nation noted it that, "It fails to take into consideration a major fallacy of the concept [of democracy], particularly in a less-developed democracy like ours, in which the impoverished, poorly informed masses are easily manipulated by people of his ilk. And Thaksin's manipulation has been well documented."

Thaksin's TRT Party won the widely boycotted elections, gaining 462 seats in parliament, with a ratio of yes-voters to no-voters of 16:10, not counting non-voters.

However, by-elections were needed for 40 TRT candidates who failed to win the minimum 20 percent required by the 1997 Constitution in uncontested races. The Democrat Party refused to contest them and, along with the PAD, petitioned the Central Administrative Court to cancel them. Chamlong Srimuang declared that the PAD would ignore the elections and "go on rallying until Thaksin resigns and Thailand gets a royally appointed prime minister".

Thaksin had announced on 4 April 2006 that he would not accept the post of prime minister after parliament reconvened, but would continue as caretaker prime minister until then. He then delegated his functions to caretaker Deputy Prime Minister Chidchai Wannasathit, moved out of Government House, and went on vacation.

Elections were held on 25 April and resulted in the TRT winning 25 of the constituencies and losing two. Yet another round of by-elections on 29 April was scheduled for 13 constituencies. The Thai Rak Thai Party was later accused and found guilty of paying smaller parties to contest the election to fulfill the 20 percent rule, while the Democrat Party was accused of paying smaller parties not to. The by-elections were suspended by the Constitutional Court while it deliberated whether or not to annul the main elections. In press interviews in exile, Thaksin was to insist on his technical majority.

=== Invalidation of the elections ===
On 8 May 2006, the Constitutional Court ruled 8–6 to invalidate the April elections based on the awkward positioning of voting booths. The ruling was called a landmark case in "judicial activism". The Democrat Party, which had boycotted the April elections, said they were now ready to contest an October election.

A new election was ordered and later set for 15 October 2006. The court found the Election Commissioners guilty of malfeasance and jailed them. But the election was cancelled when the military seized power on 19 September.

=== The ouster ===
The Thaksin government faced allegations of corruption, authoritarianism, treason, conflicts of interest, acting non-diplomatically, and muzzling of the press. Thaksin was accused of tax evasion, lèse majesté (insulting King Bhumibol), and selling assets of Thai companies to international investors. Independent bodies, including Amnesty International, criticised Thaksin's human rights record. Thaksin was also charged for concealing his wealth during his premiership.

Protests by the People's Alliance for Democracy massed in 2006, and on 19 September 2006 a military junta which later called itself the Council for National Security (CNS) replaced Thaksin's caretaker government in a coup while he was abroad. The Constitutional Tribunal dissolved the Thai Rak Thai party for electoral fraud ex post facto, banning him and TRT executives from politics for five years. The CNS-appointed Assets Examination Committee froze Thaksin and his family's assets in Thailand, totalling 76 billion baht (US$2.2 billion), claiming he had become unusually wealthy while in office. Thaksin and his wife had declared assets totalling 15.1 billion baht when he took office in 2001, although he had transferred many of his assets to his children and associates before taking office.

Thaksin returned to Thailand on 28 February 2008, after the People's Power Party, which he supported, won the post-coup elections. But after visiting Beijing for the 2008 Summer Olympics, he did not return to hear the final supreme court sentence and applied for asylum in the United Kingdom. This was refused, after which he had to move about from one country to another. In October 2008, the Thai Supreme Court found him guilty of a conflict of interest and sentenced him in absentia to two years imprisonment.

The People's Power Party was later dissolved by the Supreme Court, but party members regrouped to form the Pheu Thai Party, which Thaksin also supported. Thaksin is a supporter, and alleged bankroller, of the United Front for Democracy Against Dictatorship (aka "Red Shirts"). The government revoked Thaksin's passport for his role in the UDD's protests during Songkran 2009. On 26 February 2010, the Supreme Court seized 46 billion baht of his frozen assets, after finding him guilty of abnormal wealth. In 2009 it was announced that Thaksin had obtained Montenegrin citizenship through that country's economic citizenship program.

== September 2006 coup ==
On the evening of 19 September 2006, while Thaksin was visiting New York City to attend a UN summit and speak at the Council on Foreign Relations, the army took control of Bangkok. At Government House, some 50 soldiers ordered approximately 220 policemen in the complex to lay down their weapons. Troops also surrounded the Thaicom satellite receiving station and state-run television station Channel 11. By the morning of 20 September, tanks and military vehicles armed with machine guns were stationed at Government House, the Royal Plaza, and Ratchadamnoen Avenue.

Troops participating in the coup were from the 1st and 3rd Army Regions, the Internal Security Operations Command, the Special Warfare Centre, army units from Nakhon Ratchasima and Prachinburi, and navy sailors. According to coup leader Army General Sonthi Boonyaratglin, coup leaders had arrested Deputy Prime Minister Chitchai Wannasathit and Defense Minister Thammarak Isaragura na Ayuthaya.

The military, originally calling itself the Council for Democratic Reform under the Constitutional Monarch (CDRM), issued a statement citing the government's alleged lèse majesté, corruption, interference with state agencies, and creation of social divisions as reasons for the coup. It declared the King of Thailand the head of state, and said elections would be held soon to return democracy to the country. Thaksin departed New York for Great Britain, where he had family.

=== Thai Rak Thai Party ===
Many Thai Rak Thai party members were reported to have resigned from the party in the aftermath of the coup for fear that the party would be dissolved by the junta and its members banned from politics. These included Somsak Thepsuthin and 100 members of the Wang Nam Yen faction. It was not clear whether Suriya Jungrungreangkit, another influential member of the faction, would also resign. Sontaya Kunplome was reported to have led 20 members of the Chonburi faction in resigning from the party.

On 2 October 2006 Thaksin and his former deputy Somkid Jatusipitak resigned from the TRT. Chaturon Chaisang took over as party head.

The TRT was dissolved on 30 May 2007 by the Constitutional Tribunal, which banned over 100 of its executives, including Thaksin, from politics for five years, based on charges that two party executives (Defense Minister Thammarak and Pongsak Raktapongpaisarn) bribed a smaller party to stand in the April 2006 election. The Democrat party was cleared on a similar charge.

=== 2006 Bangkok New Year's Eve bombings ===
On 31 December 2006 and 1 January 2007, several bombs exploded in Bangkok, killing three and wounding a number of bystanders. Prime Minister General Surayud Chulanont accused "those who lost power as a result of the military takeover" of masterminding the bombings, but did not directly identify Thaksin. Thaksin went on CNN to publicly deny any involvement in the bombings. The government did not make any arrests in the case.

=== Legal charges ===
Thaksin's diplomatic passport was revoked on 31 December 2006 after the junta accused him of engaging in political activities while in exile. Thai embassies were ordered not to aid him in his travels.

A junta-appointed Assets Examination Committee (AEC) froze Thaksin's assets and attempted to bring charges against him. The AEC was criticised for being stacked with anti-Thaksin appointees. At one point, AEC Secretary Kaewsan Atibodhi claimed that "evidence and witnesses are useless", when an AEC panel recommended legal action without hearing 300 witnesses or considering 100 additional pieces of evidence. The AEC froze Thaksin's assets.

In January 2007, the Financial Institutions Development Fund (FIDF) complied with an AEC request to file a charge against Thaksin and his wife for their purchase of four 772 million baht plots of land from the FIDF in 2003. The charge was based on an alleged violation of Article 100 of the National Counter Corruption Act, which prohibits government officials and their spouses from entering into or having interests in contracts made with state agencies under their authority.

The AEC also accused Thaksin of issuing an unlawful cabinet resolution approving the spending of state funds to buy rubber saplings.

In March 2007, the Office of the Attorney-General charged Thaksin's wife and brother-in-law with conspiring to evade taxes of 546 million baht (US$15.6 million) in a 1997 transfer of Shin Corporation shares.

The AEC found Thaksin guilty of malfeasance for obstructing competition by imposing an excise tax on telecom operators. Thaksin's Cabinet had approved the relevant executive decree in 2003.

== Purchase of Manchester City Football Club ==
As prime minister, Thaksin had unsuccessfully sought to buy the English Premier League football clubs Fulham and later Liverpool, in what critics claimed was a publicity stunt in response to his political problems.

On 21 June 2007, now out of office, Thaksin bought Premier League club Manchester City for £81.6 million. He became briefly popular with fans (who nicknamed him "Frank"), especially after appointing Sven-Göran Eriksson manager of the club and bringing in prominent players. Eriksson was later critical of Thaksin's running of the club, saying "he [Thaksin] didn't understand football – he hadn't a clue." He sold the club to investors from Abu Dhabi United Group in September 2008 for a reported £200 million.

After selling Manchester City, Thaksin was nominated as "honorary president" but did not have any administrative responsibilities. However, he was later dismissed as honorary club president after the club took a position against him following his conviction and was "on the run" from Thai authorities.

== Convictions and exile ==
In May 2007, Prime Minister Surayud Chulanont said Thaksin was free to return to Thailand, and he would personally guarantee Thaksin's safety. In January 2008 Thaksin's wife Potjaman was arrested on arrival in Bangkok but released on bail after appearing at the Supreme Court, with orders not to leave the country. She was set to be tried for alleged violation of stock-trading and land sale laws.

On 28 February 2008, Thaksin arrived in Bangkok after 17 months in exile. Thaksin stated that he would not re-enter politics and wished to focus on his football interests. In March Thaksin pleaded not guilty before the Supreme Court in one of his two criminal corruption cases. He was ordered to report back on 11 April after the court granted a month-long trip to England.

In June the Supreme Court denied Thaksin's request to travel to China and Britain, since his corruption case was set for trial and was ordered to surrender his passport after arraignment. In July the court assumed jurisdiction over the fourth corruption charge against Thaksin concerning soft loans to Burma. The court also agreed to hear allegations that Thaksin, his former cabinet, and three members of the current government broke anti-gambling laws by setting up the new state lottery in 2003.

Potjaman was found guilty on 31 July and sentenced to three years imprisonment, then released on bail. The Bangkok Criminal Court also convicted her adopted brother Bhanapot Damapong and her secretary, who allegedly held assets for Thaksin by proxy, of tax evasion.

=== Request for asylum in the United Kingdom ===
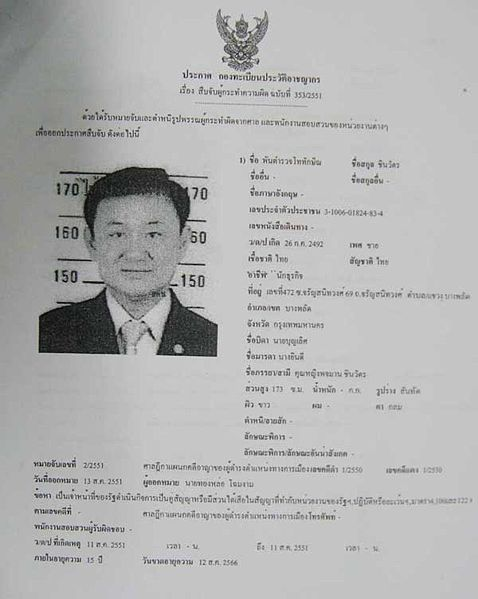
Wanted poster for Thaksin Shinawatra, issued by the Royal Thai Police on 13 August 2008, after his flight to London and failure to appear in court on 11 August 2008

On 10 August 2008, Thaksin and Potjaman violated their bail terms by attending the 2008 Summer Olympics Opening Ceremony in Beijing. Stating that he wished to return to Thailand but claimed it was not currently safe for him and his family. Thaksin sought political asylum in the United Kingdom, claiming his political enemies were interfering with the judiciary. There is no evidence that he proceeded with his request and his asylum case was neither approved nor declined.

The Thailand Supreme Court's Criminal Division for Holders of Political Positions issued a second arrest warrant on 16 September 2008 against Thaksin over another of the four pending corruption cases and ordered suspension of the trial. Several more arrest warrants were issued over his subsequent non-appearance at various corruption trials.

=== Ratchadaphisek land verdict ===
On 21 October 2008, the Supreme Court's Criminal Division for Holders of Political Positions ruled that Thaksin, while prime minister, abused his power to help his wife buy public land at auction, and sentenced him to two years in jail.

Soon after, Thaksin told Reuters, "I have been informed of the result. I had long anticipated that it would turn out this way", and added that the case was politically motivated.

Chief prosecutor Seksan Bangsombun called on Britain to extradite him. Thaksin now denied he was seeking political asylum in Britain.

=== Self-imposed exile ===
On 10 November 2008, a Philippine spokesman said his government would "politely" turn down any request for political refuge from Thaksin due to Manila's "friendly" relations with Bangkok.

The British Government Home Office, meanwhile, revoked Potjaman and Thaksin's visas due to their convictions, while the Bangkok British Embassy e-mailed airlines asking them to disallow either of them to board flights to Britain. In late 2008, Arabian Business reported that the UK froze US$4.2 billion of his assets in the UK. The UK government did not confirm or deny this claim.

Thaksin had reportedly considered sanctuaries such as China, the Bahamas, Nicaragua, and several other countries in South America and Africa. Reports said the Shinawatras were granted honorary citizenship by the Bahamas and Nicaragua, and were building a £5.5 million home in China. As of late-May 2009, he reportedly remained in Dubai. A spokesman claimed Thaksin was travelling on six passports, none of them Thai. In December 2008 Thaksin obtained a residency permit for Germany which was subsequently withdrawn on 28 May 2009 when the German government became aware of the arrangement. Thaksin then obtained status as a diplomat of Nicaragua. Guido Westerwelle, German foreign minister, lifted the travel restriction banning Thaksin from entering Germany on 15 July 2011 after the election victory of Thaksin's proxy party.

In a November 2009 interview, Thaksin told The Times that he was living in Dubai, still had access to about US$100 million of his money outside of Thailand, and was investing in gold mines, diamond polishing, and lottery licenses in various countries.

=== Songkran unrest ===
In mid-April 2009, violent protests of mostly Thaksin supporters calling themselves the National United Front of Democracy Against Dictatorship (UDD) led to the cancellation of the ASEAN summit in Pattaya and a declaration of a state of emergency in Bangkok. Thaksin had given encouragement at UDD rallies via satellite and phone-in link, at one point calling for a "people's revolution". Following suppression of the protests he claimed to have merely been offering "moral support".

Thaksin supported protests by the UDD against the Abhisit Vejjajiva government, demanding Thaksin be allowed to return free from all the earlier corruption charges. Thaksin denied leading the UDD, claiming he only gave them "moral support".

=== Money laundering allegations ===
In April 2009, Privy Councilor General Pichitr Kullavanijaya reported he had been informed by former US ambassador to Thailand Ralph L. Boyce that Thaksin had laundered 100 billion baht (US$2.8 billion) through Cayman Island bank accounts to organise the anti-government protests. Boyce himself said that he had "...no idea why he was cited as a knowledgeable source about where Thaksin may or may not have made deposits, and that he has no such information."

=== Economic advisor to Cambodia ===
On 4 November 2009, it was announced that Thaksin had been appointed as special advisor to the Cambodian government and Hun Sen and stated that Cambodia would refuse to extradite Thaksin because it considered him a victim of political persecution. On 5 November 2009, both countries recalled their ambassadors.

Thai Prime Minister Abhisit Vejjajiva stated this was "the first diplomatic retaliation measure". Stating Cambodia was interfering in Thailand's internal affairs and as a result all bilateral agreements would be reviewed. Sok An, a member of the Council of Ministers and Deputy Prime Minister of Cambodia, said Thaksin's appointment is a decision internal to Cambodia and "conforms to international practice". The mutual withdrawal of ambassadors is the most severe diplomatic action to have occurred between the two countries.

==== Spy controversy ====
On 11 November 2009, Sivarak Chutipong was arrested by Cambodian police for passing the confidential flight plans of Thaksin and Cambodian prime minister Hun Sen to Kamrob Palawatwichai, First Secretary of the Royal Thai Embassy in Cambodia. Sivarak was a Thai engineer working in Cambodia for Cambodia Air Traffic Service, the private firm which managed air traffic control in Cambodia. Sivarak denied that he was a spy, and the Thai government claimed that he was innocent and that the incident was a Thaksin/Cambodian plot to further damage relations between the two countries. The Thai First Secretary was expelled from Cambodia. Sivarak demanded that former First Secretary Kamrob speak out and restore his damaged reputation by confirming he was not involved in a spy ring. Kamrob refused to provide comment to the press throughout the controversy, and Kasit's secretary, Chavanond Intarakomalyasut, insisted that although that there was no misconduct on the part of the First Secretary or Sivarak, there would be no statement from Kamrob.

Sivarak was later sentenced to jail for seven years. Thaksin requested the Cambodian government to pardon Sivarak, and he was soon pardoned by King Norodom Sihamoni and expelled. Deputy Prime Minister Suthep Thaugsuban later accused Sivarak of staging his own arrest in order to discredit the Abhisit government. Former Thai spy chief and Foreign Minister Prasong Soonsiri concurred, claiming, "It has been a set-up from the beginning.

=== Frozen asset seizure ===
==== Prior to the verdict ====
On 26 February 2010, the Thai Supreme Court was scheduled to render its verdict on whether to seize Thaksin's Thai assets, worth 76 billion baht frozen by the AEC after the coup. The AEC froze the assets under the authority of Announcement No. 30 of the military junta. Tensions ran high throughout Thailand. Tens of thousands of government security forces were deployed, particularly in routes leading to Bangkok. However, the UDD denied that it would rally on the date of the verdict. The nine Supreme Court judges had to make a judgment on accusations of abnormal wealth through policy corruption. Policy corruption, was defined by the court as the abuse of powers by implementing economic policies that, while in themselves legal and of potential benefit to society and the economy, also aided companies that were owned in part by the policy maker. The prosecution claimed that Thaksin abused his powers five times while premier.

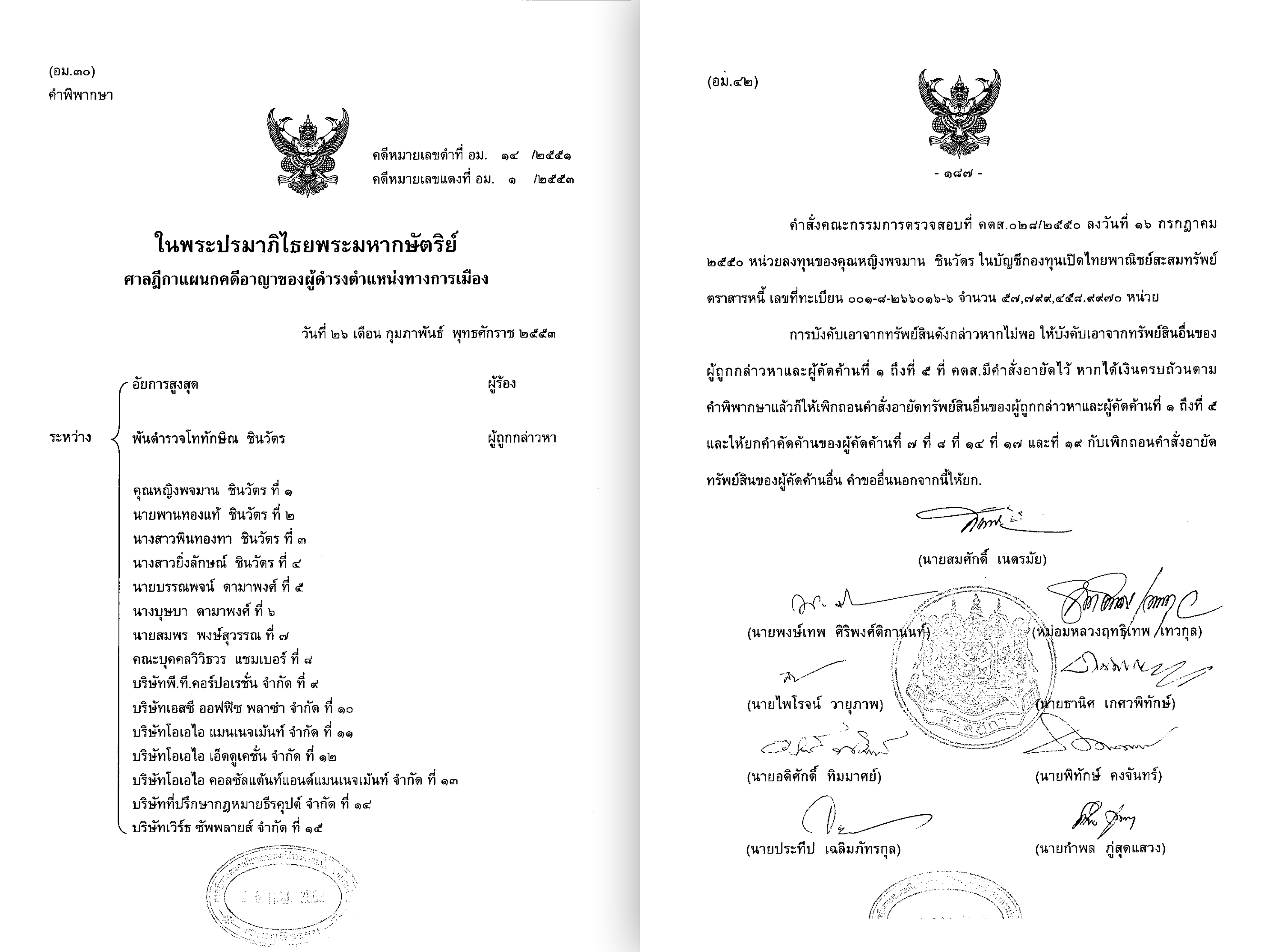
The first and last pages of the verdict with the signatures of the nine supreme court judges

==== The verdict ====
The court first ruled that Thaksin and Potjaman were the real owners of the assets, rather than his children and relatives. The court also ruled that it had the authority to seize assets, based on the announcements of the junta. The court found Thaksin guilty of four out of five policy corruption, and ordered that 46 billion baht be seized. The remaining 30 billion was to remain frozen.

- Count 1: Conversion of telecom concession fees into excise charges. Previously, telecom operators had to pay TOT/CAT a percentage of their revenue as a concession fee (TOT/CAT are state-owned enterprises, although they were going through the process of privatisation). The Thaksin government modified this into a system wherein all operators would instead directly pay the government an equivalent excise tax. The imposition of excise tax here would eventually be passed on to consumers. Thaksin claimed that all operators continued to pay the same total costs. The judges ruled that this benefited AIS while harming TOT, and thus was an abuse of power.
- Count 2: Modification of a revenue sharing agreement on pre-paid mobile services. Previously, telecom operators had to pay TOT a percentage of their revenues for post-paid mobile services. To offer pre-paid services, which generally cost the consumer less, AIS negotiated with TOT to design a revenue sharing agreement for pre-paid services that offered less revenue to TOT, an estimated loss of 14.2 billion baht (revenue reduced from 25 to 20 percent) from 2001 to 2006 and another estimated loss of 56 billion baht (revenue reduced from 30 to 20 percent) from 2006 to 2015. The judges ruled that the terms of the pre-paid agreement harmed TOT while benefiting AIS. The judges did not dispute the fact that TOT's total revenue actually increased substantially as a result of the agreement, but noted that the rise in pre-paid revenue came about while harming TOT's post-paid revenue. The massive growth in Thai mobile penetration from 13 percent in 2001 to 80 percent in 2007, due almost completely to pre-paid services, and the reduction in AIS market share from 68 to 53 percent in the same period were not taken into account by the court.
- Count 3: Modification of mobile roaming agreement. Previously, there were no roaming agreements between mobile operators – subscribers from one operator were not allowed to use services on another operator's network, thus limiting the growth of the mobile industry. Under the Thaksin government, roaming was allowed, with roaming fees deducted from the revenue that AIS and other operators had to share with TOT and other state enterprises. Essentially, TOT helped AIS shoulder the costs of its subscribers roaming on the mobile networks of other operators. This reduced TOT and CAT's income while benefiting the operators. However, the judges ruled that it while benefited AIS, it did so to the benefit of AIS's new owners (Temasek Holdings) rather than Thaksin, and hence was not an abuse of power.
- Count 4: Replacement of ThaiCom 4 with iPSTAR. A previous government had originally contracted with ShinSat to launch and operate ThaiCom 4 as a backup satellite for ThaiCom 3. Instead, ShinSat negotiated with the Thaksin government to launch iPSTAR, at the time the largest commercial satellite in history, which it claimed could offer commercial internet services while also providing backup for ThaiCom 3. However, the claim is not technically possible since iPSTAR does not have C-band transponders as Thaicom 3. Shin Corp's ownership in ShinSat was subsequently reduced from 51% to 40%. The judges found that the changes in ownership and satellite specification change reduced Thailand's communications security by not having the backup satellite for ThaiCom 3 on the one-to-one basis. It also noted that the negotiations allowed ShinSat to launch a satellite with much greater commercial potential than ThaiCom 4 without having to bid for a separate concession agreement.
- Count 5: EXIM Bank loan to Myanmar to pay for ThaiCom services. Thaksin was scheduled to meet with Burmese leaders to negotiate trade deals between the two countries. One of the deals negotiated gave Myanmar a Thai EXIM Bank loan to purchase 376 million baht in satellite services from ShinSat. Thaksin noted that many deals were struck in the negotiations, and that 16 other companies also benefited from the EXIM Bank's loans. The judges ruled that the loans gave preferential treatment to Thaksin, and hence were an abuse of power.

The judges decided to seize 46 billion differences in value of Shin Corp. shares from the date when he came to office and the value when the shares were sold to Singapore's Temasek Holdings in early 2006. Note that, Thaksin had declared around 500 million baht in assets and Pojaman had 8 billion to 9 billion baht while Thaksin served as prime minister. Nevertheless, during that period, Shin shares gained 121%, compared with a 128% gain in the benchmark SET index, while Siam Cement, one of Thailand's premier blue chip companies, gained 717%. The judges did not find that Thaksin was guilty of malfeasance. They also noted that any benefit to the government from Thaksin's policies was irrelevant to the ruling. The government reaped approximately 100 billion baht in increased revenue from changes in the concession agreements alone.

==== Aftermath ====
In an email to his supporters, Thaksin claimed that the court was used as a tool. He also noted how the Thai stock market rose to the benefit of many companies, not just his, and claimed that all charges against him were politically motivated. He thanked his supporters for not protesting while the verdict was being read, and implored them to use non-violent means in the future. Pojaman na Pombejra insisted that tens of billions of baht of her wealth had been given to her children and relatives well before Thaksin took office in 2001 and denied that her children and relatives were nominees of her and her husband. She also denied having any control over Ample Rich and Win Mark, two firms that the AEC had accused of being her nominees. In spite of Pojaman's claim, Thaksin was the authorised signature for Ample Rich through 2005, making him the only individual authorised to withdraw funds from the company's account until he transferred the authority to his children, four years after he took office in 2001. Some UDD members held a small protest in front of the court, but did not disrupt the ruling as the government had predicted they would. The UDD leaders announced that a large-scale protest was scheduled to be held on 14 March 2010.

On the evening of 27 February, M67 grenades were thrown from a motorcycle outside three branches of Bangkok Bank. Nobody was hurt or injured in the attacks. The perpetrators were not caught, and no organisation claimed responsibility for the attacks. Thaksin and the UDD were quick to deny any involvement. An arrest warrant was issued based on sketches of a motorcycle driver.

=== Transfer of Shin Corp. Shares ===
The law does not allow the prime minister to run a side business while holding office. Charges were pressed against Thaksin on wealth concealment while in office. Prior to the wealth declaration of Thaksin and his family when he took office, there had been an appeal to The National Anti-Corruption Commission that there were some suspicions about the numbers in the report.

==== Transferring to maid and driver ====
Thaksin was charged with illegally concealing billions of baht of his wealth by transferring ownership of Shin Corp. shares to his drivers and maids without their knowledge. Thaksin tearfully told the Constitutional Court that it was an honest mistake before the Court acquitted him on the charges.

==== Transferring shares to children who reached maturity ====
There was also a controversy over whether there was any hidden tax evasion when Thaksin and Potjaman transferred their Shin Corporation shares to their children. Panthongtae and Pinthongta Shinawatra were accused of being nominees of their parents.

The transfer of shares from Thaksin and Potjaman to Parnthongtae was claimed to have been a sham, since there was no actual transfer of money. Panthongtae said the shares were sold to him at cost. Thaksin stated he had a written agreement proving the transfer to his son. Prior to the transfer, Panthongtae had signed an agreement with his father to settle a 4.5 billion baht debt from buying 300 million shares of the Thai Military Bank (TMB). However, the actual market value of the TMB shares at that time was only 1.5 billion baht. This showed a "fake debt" of 3 billion baht had been created. The Assets Examination Committee (AEC) discovered that the account of Panthongtae's which had received Shin Corporation's dividend had also been used to transfer money to Potjaman's account, to the amount of 1.1 billion baht.

Pintongtha was also accused of being a nominee for her parents. She said that the money from her mother was a "birthday present". This birthday present was used to buy 367 million shares of Shin Corporation, which left her brother with the same amount. The AEC found the account had been receiving dividends from Shin Corp. There were no transactions between Pintongtha's account and her mother's account. However, the dividend money was used to buy SC Asset shares from WinMark to the amount of 71 million baht and shares from 5 real-estate firms from 2 funds in 2004 worth 485 million baht.

DSI, AEC, and Securities and Exchange Commission discovered that both WinMark and the two funds are owned by Thaksin and his former wife.

== Return to Thailand in 2023 ==
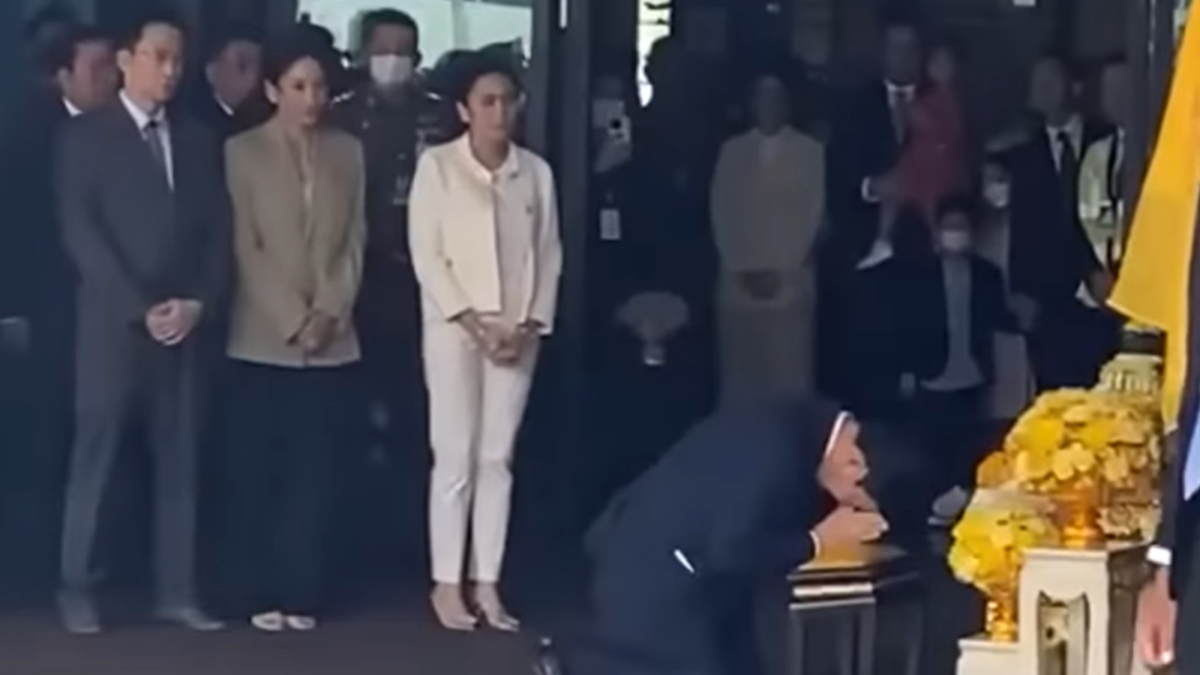
Thaksin at Don Mueang International Airport after returning to Thailand after 15 years of exile

During the run-up to the 2023 general election, Thaksin announced his intent to return to Thailand, after 15 years of self-imposed exile. He said that he was willing to serve his prison sentences in order to finally return home and be with his family. Following several postponements as the government formation process dragged on, he arrived on 22 August, the same day that Pheu Thai candidate Srettha Thavisin would be voted in as prime minister, and was promptly taken to the Supreme Court and then Bangkok Remand Prison to serve a sentence of eight years. Political observers believed that he would be unlikely to serve the entire sentence, and that his return was negotiated as part of a political deal that also brought military-oriented parties into the coalition government.

=== Royal pardon ===
His sentence was commuted from eight years to one year by King Vajiralongkorn on 1 September after he submitted a formal royal pardon request. On 13 February 2024, Thai justice minister Tawee Sodsong announced that Thaksin was among 930 prisoners who had been granted parole on account of age and health. He was released on parole on 18 February, after spending six months in a Bangkok hospital. Shinawatra, wearing a neck brace and sitting beside his daughters Paetongtarn Shinawatra and Pintongta was driven away from the police hospital and arrived at his Bangkok mansion after his release. On 14 March, he made his first public appearance since his release at the City Pillar Shrine in Bangkok wearing a neck brace and accompanied by Paetongtarn, before going to Chiang Mai Province.

=== Legal troubles ===
In May 2024, Thaksin was charged with lèse-majesté by the attorney-general over remarks he made during an interview with South Korean media while in exile in 2015. On 14 June, Thaksin was charged with royal defamation. On 17 August, Thaksin received a royal pardon on the occasion of King Vajiralongkorn's birthday.

On 23 February 2025, Thaksin Shinawatra issued a public apology over the Tak Bai incident. On 22 August, he was acquitted by the Criminal Court of Thailand over the lèse-majesté charges filed against him in 2024.

Shinawatra left Thailand again on 4 September 2025, after a ruling by the Constitutional Court that left him exposed to an arrest warrant. Police said that his plane was allowed to take off because there wasn't, at the moment of departure, any order against him. He reportedly flew to Dubai, and claimed that he did so for the purpose of seeing doctors there and that he intended to return to Thailand. He returned to Thailand on 8 September 2025.

=== Imprisonment ===
On 9 September 2025, the next day, the Supreme Court of Thailand sentenced Thaksin to serve one year in jail as per his sentence commuted by the King, as it deemed that his prison sentence had not been carried out appropriately. The court ruled that he exaggerated the severity of his illness to avoid his prison stay upon his arrival back in Thailand in August 2023, and intentionally prolonged his stay at Police General Hospital to remain out of jail. He was immediately taken to Klong Prem Central Prison in Bangkok to begin his sentence. His appeal for a further royal commutation of his one-year jail term was rejected. On 11 May 2026, he was released from imprisonment as part of an early release scheme for elderly prisoners. On 9 June 2026, Thaksin was pardoned under a royal pardon decree, after having his electronic monitoring device removed.

== Ancestry ==
Ancestors of Thaksin Shinawatra

8. Seng Saekhu
4. Chiang Saekhu
9. Thongdi
2. Loet Shinawatra
5. Saeng Samana
1. Thaksin Shinawatra
6. Charoen Ramingwong
3. Yindi Ramingwong
14. Somphamit, the Prince Chaisongkhram
7. Princess Chanthip na Chiangmai
15. Usa na Chiangmai

== Honours, decorations and awards ==
=== National honours ===
The list of national honours received by Thaksin Shinawatra has been arranged as per the Thai honours order of precedence.

- Thailand:
  - 1996 – Knight Grand Cordon (Special Class) of the Most Exalted Order of the White Elephant
  - 1995 – Knight Grand Cordon (Special Class) of the Most Noble Order of the Crown of Thailand
  - 2001 – Knight Grand Cross (First Class) of the Most Admirable Order of the Direkgunabhorn
  - 2002 – Knight Grand Commander of the Most Illustrious Order of Chula Chom Klao
  - 2003 – Boy Scout Citation Medal of Vajira, First Class

==== Revocation of royal decorations ====
Thaksin Shinawatra's royal decorations were revoked in 2019 after he was convicted of corruption in 2008 and fled Thailand to avoid imprisonment. The Thai government, with royal approval, officially recalled his honors following legal protocol for serious offenses.

=== Foreign honours ===
- Cambodia:
  - Grand Cross of the Royal Order of Sahametrei (2001)
- Bahrain:
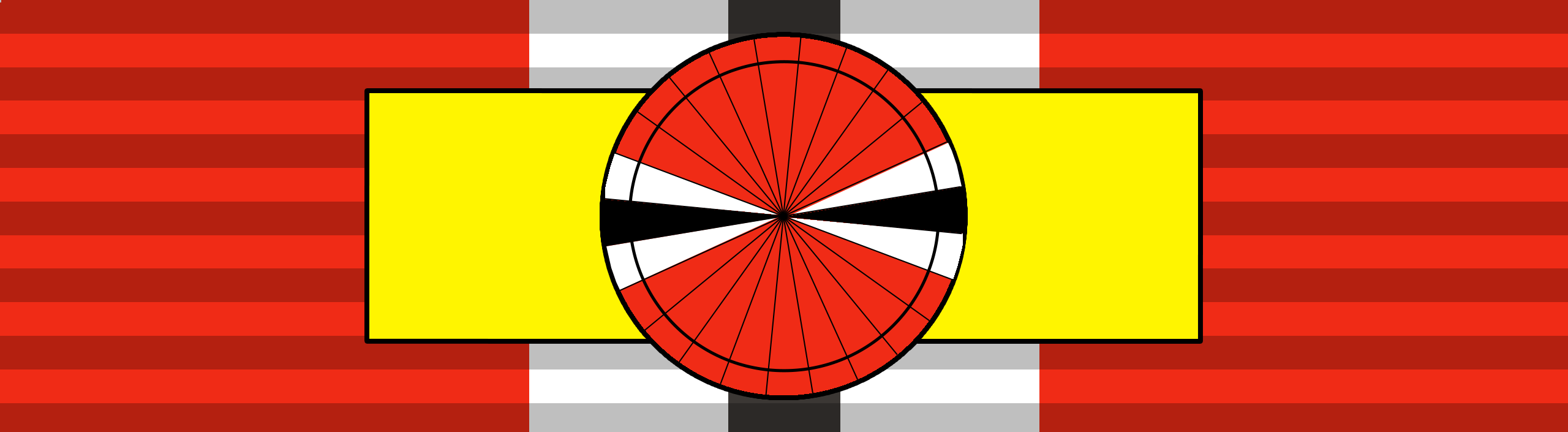
  - Member 1st Class of the King Hamad Order of the Renaissance (2002)
- Brunei:
  - First Class of the Most Blessed Order of Loyalty to the State of Brunei (2002)
- Sweden:
  - Commander Grand Cross of the Royal Order of the Polar Star (2003)
- Netherlands:
  - Grand Cross of the Order of Orange-Nassau (2004)
- Peru:
  - Grand Cross of the Order of the Sun of Peru (2004)

=== Academic rank ===
- 2007 – Visiting Professor of Takushoku University in Tokyo, Japan

=== Awards ===
- Asean Business Man of the Year, from ASEAN Institute for Peace and Reconciliation (AIPR), in 1992
- Telecommunication Development for Social Welfare Award of 1993 from Telecommunication Society of Thailand
- The 1993 Outstanding Telecom Man of the Year Award, honored by the Singapore Business Times as 1 of 12 Leading Asian Businessmen
- Asian CEO of the Year
- Honorary Doctor of Arts (Communication Arts) (Thammasart University, Thailand)
- First Thai to be granted "Lee Kuan Yew Exchange Fellowship" (Singapore)
- 1 of 50 Influential people in The World from Time magazine
- 1 of 3 Thai-Filipino Relations Goodwill from Ambassadors Philippines Embassy in Thailand
- Outstanding Criminal Justice Alumnus Awards from Sam Houston State University
- Distinguished Alumni Award from Sam Houston State University
- The honorary award from the Mass Media Photographer Association of Thailand
- International Forgiveness Award 2004
- Honorary doctorate degree from Plekhanov Russian Academy of Economics
- The ABLF Statesman Award 2012

== See also ==
- List of prime ministers of Thailand
- Thailand political crisis 2005-2006
- Thaksinomics
- Seng Saekhu
- Sondhi Limthongkul
- People's Alliance for Democracy
- Constitution of Thailand
- Tak Bai incident genocide against minority Islam group
- Racism in Thailand

== Notes ==
Political offices
Preceded by Chuan Leekpai	Prime Minister of Thailand; 2001–2006	Succeeded by Chitchai Wannasathit; Acting
Preceded by Chitchai Wannasathit; Acting	Prime Minister of Thailand; 2006	Succeeded by Sonthi Boonyaratglin; President of the Administrative Reform Council
New office	Special Economic Adviser of Cambodia; 2009–2010	Position abolished
Diplomatic posts
Preceded by Vicente Fox	Chairperson of APEC; 2003	Succeeded by Ricardo Lagos
