= 2006 Thai general election =

- 2 April 2006
- All 500 seats in the House of Representatives; 251 seats needed for a majority
- Turnout: 64.77% (▼7.79pp)
Party	Leader	Vote %	Seats	+/–
Thai Rak Thai	Thaksin Shinawatra	59.91	461	+84
Vacant	–	–	39	+39
This lists parties that won seats. See the complete results below.
Prime Minister before	Prime Minister after
Thaksin Shinawatra; Thai Rak Thai	Election results annulled Sonthi Boonyaratglin (CDR) became Prime Minister

General elections were held in Thailand in April 2006. Elections for the lower house of the Thai National Assembly, the House of Representatives, were held on 2 April 2006 and elections for the upper house, the Senate, were held on 19 April 2006. The Constitutional Court later invalidated the House of Representatives election results and ordered a new round of voting.

The ruling Thai Rak Thai (TRT) party of Prime Minister Thaksin Shinawatra won a majority seats in the House of Representatives, partly as a result of the decision by the major opposition parties to boycott the elections. Nearly complete results showed that TRT received 61% of the valid vote and about 460 of the 500 seats. Despite this, Thaksin announced his resignation two days after the election.

Although TRT easily won the election in terms of both votes and seats, the results were seen by Thaksin's opponents and media critics as a rejection of his call for an overwhelming mandate. In parts of Bangkok and in southern Thailand, most TRT candidates were elected on minority votes after the majority of voters used the "abstain" option on their ballot papers. In a number of southern seats TRT candidates failed to poll the required 20% of registered voters, rendering these southern seats invalid and resulting in party dissolution charges against Thai Rak Thai and Democrat Parties. TRT won all the seats in the Northern and North-Eastern (Isan) regions, and also in the Central region apart from Bangkok.

Due to the election result, King Bhumibol Adulyadej took the unprecedented step of calling the elections undemocratic, and the election was declared invalid by the Constitutional Court. New elections were scheduled for October 2006, but were canceled when the military overthrew the government.

== Background ==
The elections followed the decision by Prime Minister Thaksin to dissolve the House of Representatives. King Bhumibol Adulyadej granted Thaksin a dissolution even though the last election was held only in February 2005, and even though Thaksin's party had a huge majority in the House. At the February 2005 election, the TRT won 375 seats out of 500, with its former coalition partner, the Thai Nation Party taking 26 seats. The opposition Democratic Party of Thailand won 96 seats.

Thaksin's decision to call early elections followed a mounting campaign of criticism of his personal financial dealings. In January the government changed regulations for telecommunications companies allowing an increase in foreign ownership from 24% to 49%, and within the same month he and his family sold its stake in Shin Corporation, a leading communication company, for 73 billion baht (about $US1.88 billion), an enormous profit on which the Shinawatras legally paid no tax, even though family members bought and sold shares in the company in a 24-hour period. This sparked a series of angry demonstrations in the capital. Nevertheless, Thaksin's parliamentary position was under no threat.

The English-language newspaper the Bangkok Post reported Thaksin as saying, "I cannot allow mob rule to supersede the law," and citing intelligence reports of "instigators of violence" seeking to exploit the divisive situation as a reason for dissolving the House of Representatives. The country could not suffer a new round of "bruises" when it was still suffering from the violent events of May 1992, with relatives of victims still to be healed, Thaksin said.

Thaksin also cited the impact on the economy of the political situation, pointing to the questions it had raised about the future of megaprojects and the ups and downs on the stock market. "I am ready to accept the decisions of the people. But I will never accept those outside the system who claim to be deciding for the people," he said.

== Opposition boycott ==
On 25 February the Post reported Democrat party leader Abhisit Vejjajiva as saying he was "ready to become a prime minister who adheres to the principles of good governance and ethics, not authoritarianism." The next day, however, it was announced that the Democratic Party, along with other opposition parties, were considering boycotting the elections. At a press conference Abhisit joined the Thai Nation Party's Banharn Silpa-archa and the Mahachon Party's Sanan Kachornprasart and said that the three parties would consult with party members before making a final decision.

Abhisit said that the elections "lacked legitimacy' and were an attempt by Thaksin to "divert public attention." from the Shin Corp scandal. "Boycotting the poll is one option but the parties still have to explore other possibilities allowed by the constitution," he said. Thaksin's behaviour was "exposing the country to a new political system, the Thaksin system, which bent the constitution,". Abhisit said. "The charter was once the people's charter. Now it has been hijacked."

Banharn said the sudden dissolution left opposition political parties "no time to prepare a list of constituency candidates and list candidates." Only Thai Rak Thai was well equipped with wealth, people and power," he said.

On 27 February the three opposition parties announced a boycott of the election after Thaksin reportedly refused to sign a pledge to implement constitutional reforms. The Bangkok Post reported Abhisit as saying that "under the current circumstances" a fair general election was unlikely. What was likely, he said, "was an election that would yield the outcome Mr Thaksin was expecting."

"The prime minister does not respond to the intention of the three political parties," Abhisit said. "He is diverting from the heart of the solution and creating the process that sees only uncertainties and complications. That does not assure us that there will be serious political reform."

Deputy Thai Rak Thai leader Khunying Sudarat Keyuraphan said that the government was doing its best to find a way out of the political crisis. "Dissolving the House to return power to the people is the best way out under this constitution and democracy," she said. "But you do not accept it. What better choice could Thai Rak Thai make?"

The decision by the Democratic Party and the Thai Nation Party to boycott the elections meant that almost the whole of southern Thailand lost its previous political representation, since at the 2005 election, Thaksin's party won only one seat in the south.

== Results ==
Unofficial results published by Bangkok newspapers showed that TRT received over 61% of all valid votes (about 53% of all votes cast), and won about 460 of the 500 seats. Voters in the Central, Northern and North-Eastern regions voted overwhelmingly for TRT candidates, who were unopposed in the great majority of seats in these regions. But the majority of voters in Bangkok and in the Southern region rejected the government. In many constituencies in these areas voters used the "abstain" option on their ballot papers to reject TRT candidates, even when they were running unopposed. TRT received fewer votes than the number of abstention votes in 28 of 36 Bangkok constituencies. In 2005, TRT won 30 of the Bangkok seats.

Party	Party-list			Constituency			Total seats
Party	Votes	%	Seats	Votes	%	Seats	Total seats
Thai Rak Thai Party	16,420,755	59.91	100	15,341,313	60.83	361	461
Thai Farmer Party	675,662	2.47	0	267,196	1.06	0	0
People's Power Party	305,015	1.11	0	267,196	1.06	0	0
Thai Citizen Party	292,895	1.07	0	267,196	1.06	0	0
Dhammacracy Party	255,853	0.93	0	267,196	1.06	0	0
Thai Help Thai Party	146,680	0.54	0	267,196	1.06	0	0
Pattana Chart Thai Party	134,534	0.49	0	267,196	1.06	0	0
Pandin Thai Party	125,008	0.46	0	267,196	1.06	0	0
Blank votes	9,051,706	33.03	–	9,610,874	38.11	–	–
Vacant seats						39	39
Total	27,408,108	100.00	100	25,219,383	100.00	400	500
Valid votes	27,408,108	94.22		25,219,383	86.97		
Invalid votes	1,680,101	5.78		3,778,981	13.03		
Total votes	29,088,209	100.00		28,998,364	100.00		
Registered voters/turnout	44,909,562	64.77		44,778,628	64.76		
Source: Psephos, Thai Rath

== Aftermath ==
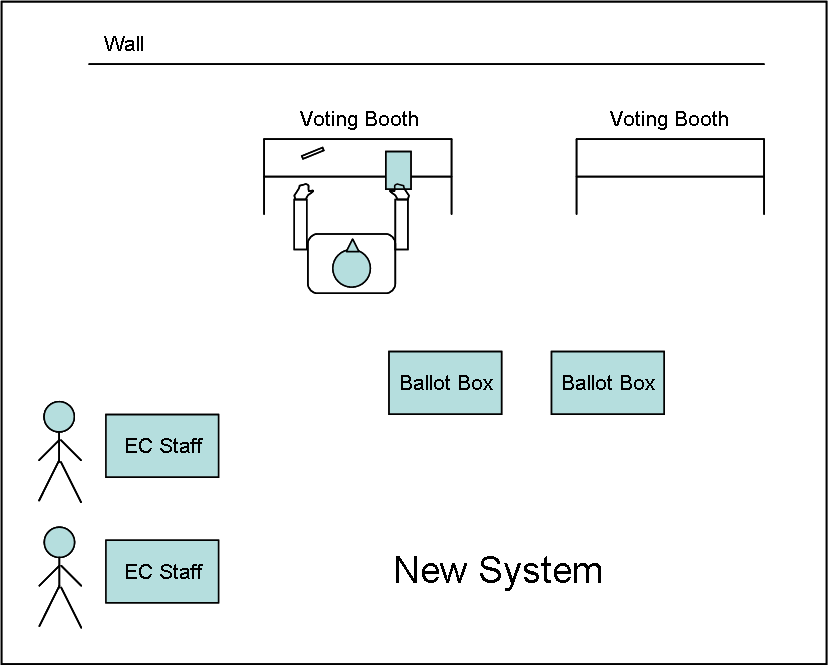
Diagram showing the new system of voting, with back to the public

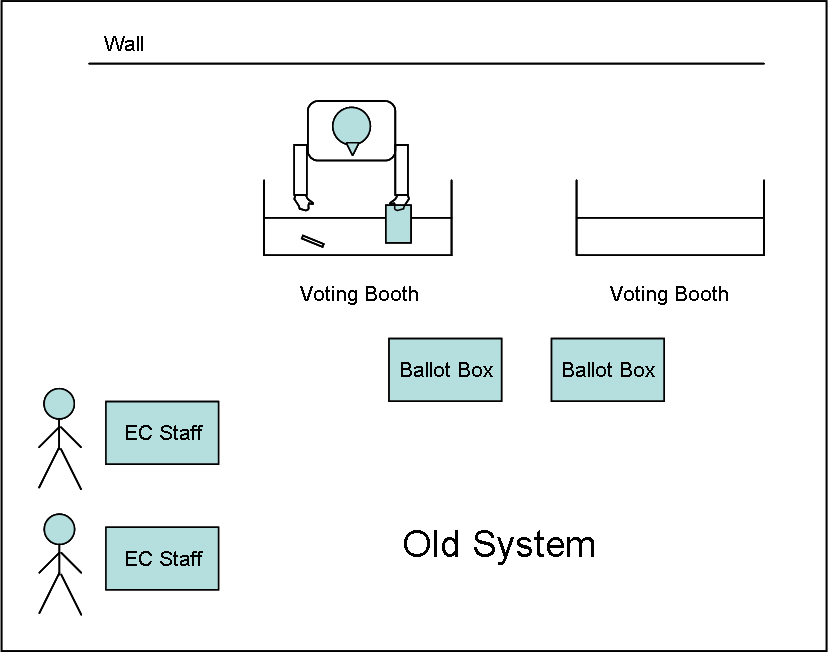
Diagram showing the old system of voting, with face to the public

On 3 April 2006 the People's Alliance for Democracy (PAD) petitioned the Administrative Court to suspend the results of the election and accused the Election Commission of violating voter privacy. The EC repositioned voting booths so that voters' backs were to the public, whereas in previous elections, voters faced the public, with a board one-half meter tall at the front of the booth separating the voter from the public. The EC claimed the new arrangement was designed to prevent various forms of poll fraud including the use of cameras by voters to take photographs of their ballots. After the 2005 election, cameras and cameraphones had been banned from voting stations due to fears that canvassers would demand ballot photographs in return for money. However, the PAD claimed that this allowed onlookers to peek over voters' shoulders and see who they voted for.

After unofficial voting results became public, the PAD declared that it would ignore the results of the election. He further said that the "PAD will go on rallying until Thaksin resigns and Thailand gets a royally-appointed prime minister".

The elections were finally declared invalid by Thailand's Constitutional Court, which found that the positioning of the voting booths violated voter privacy. The Constitutional Court later pressured the Election Commission to resign for its management of the April elections. The Court was unsuccessful in pressuring the EC head to resign; however, it did prevent the Senate from appointing a replacement for commissioner Jaral Buranapansri who had died. This prevented the EC from having a quorum. It later found the remaining Commissioners guilty of malfeasance and jailed them.

On 30 May 2006 the Cabinet decided to hold new elections on 15 October 2006.
