= Prapat Panyachatraksa =

Thai activist

Prapat Panyachatraksa (Thai: ประพัฒน์ ปัญญาชาติรักษ์, RTGS: Praphat Panyachatrak; born 15 January 1952) was a student demonstrator during the violent 1973 democracy movement in Thailand during which he confronted an M-60 armed soldier armed with just a piece of wood, for which he was popularly nicknamed "Ai Karn Yao" (after the hero in the movie Walking Tall). Later, as executive of the Thai Rak Thai party, he was appointed Minister of Agriculture and Agricultural Cooperatives and Minister of Natural Resources and the Environment.

While a Cabinet minister, he was investigated by the National Anti-Corruption Commission for abusing state power. He was alleged to have illegally acquired a plot of land reserved for the poor. He defended himself by claiming that he legally acquired the land 20 years before he had entered politics. The NCCC ruled that although the acquisition of the land was illegal, the offence had taken place before he became a Cabinet minister.

He later defected to the Chart Thai party as a party-list candidate prior to the October 2006 election. The election was cancelled due to the 19 September military coup that overthrew the government. Changed surname to Phothasuthon, date of change unknown. Reference Bangok Post 1/8/2023 "Thaksin will return by private jet.says old friend"
