= Universal Coverage (Thailand) =

Public health insurance system

National Health Security Act B.E. 2545

Parliament of Thailand
- Territorial extent: Thailand
- Passed by: House of Representatives
- Passed: 31 August 2002
- Enacted by: Senate
- Assented to by: King Bhumibol
- Royal assent: 18 November 2002
- Commenced: 19 November 2002
- Administered by: National Health Security Office

Legislative history

Initiating chamber: House of Representatives
- Introduced by: First Thaksin Cabinet
- First reading: 22 November 2001
- Second reading: 15 May 2002
- Third reading: 15 May 2002

Revising chamber: Senate
- First reading: 30 May 2002
- Second reading: 31 August 2002
- Third reading: 31 August 2002
- Status: Current legislation

The Universal Coverage Scheme (UCS), also known as the Gold Card or 30-baht scheme, is the largest of the three Thai healthcare programmes that provide universal health care. It covers the majority of the population, and is directly funded by the national budget and allocated on a mixed per-capita basis by the National Health Security Office (NHSO). The programme was launched in 2002 during the government of Prime Minister Thaksin Shinawatra, based on foundational developmental work by public-health civil servants, especially Dr. Sa-nguan Nitayarumphong, beginning in the 1980s.

At its launch, the programme required a copayment of 30 baht (approx. 1 US dollar) per visit, and it became widely known by that name. Thailand became among of the few middle-income countries to implement universal healthcare, and the system was internationally praised and contributed greatly to Thaksin's political popularity.

The system has, since its original implementation, seen various modifications, including the removal of the 30 baht copayment (which happened following Thaksin's overthrow by coup in 2006) and the provision of direct access to antiretroviral therapy, haemodialysis and other chronic diseases. Further reforms are still being considered in order to address financial sustainability issues.
