= Kiattichai Chaichaowarat =

Thai politician (1938–2026)

Kiattichai Chaichaowarat MPCh, MVM
- เกียรติชัย ชัยเชาวรัตน์

Minister attached to the Prime Minister's Office
- In office 15 August 1997 – 24 October 1997
- Prime Minister: Chavalit Yongchaiyudh
- Preceded by: Chingchai Mongkoltham; Piyanat Wacharaporn
- Succeeded by: Phitak Intrawityanunt

Deputy Minister of Interior
- In office 18 July 1995 – 15 August 1997
- Prime Minister: Banharn Silpa-archa; Chavalit Yongchaiyudh
- Preceded by: Suthas Ngernmuen
- Succeeded by: Asa Meksavan

Deputy Minister of Industry
- In office 29 September 1992 – 11 December 1994
- Prime Minister: Chuan Leekpai
- Minister: Sanan Kachornprasart
- Preceded by: Veera Susangkarakan
- Succeeded by: Pratheung Khamprakorp

Member of the House of Representatives for Udon Thani Province
- In office 22 March 1992 – 9 November 2000
- In office 24 April 1983 – 29 April 1988

Personal details
- Born: 11 December 1938 Udon Thani, Siam
- Died: 22 August 2026 (aged 87) Udon Thani, Thailand
- Party: Social Action (1983–1986); Ruam Thai (1986–1992); New Aspiration Party (1992–2000); Chart Pattana (2000–2004); Chart Thai (2004–2008); Phlang Phonlamuang Thai (2018–2026)
- Spouse: Laksana Chaichaowarat

Kiattichai Chaichaowarat (Thai: เกียรติชัย ชัยเชาวรัตน์; 11 December 1938 – 22 August 2026) was a Thai politician. He served as the President of Office of the Prime Minister from August to October 1997, Deputy Minister of Interior from 1995 to 1997, and Deputy Minister of Industry from 1992 to 1994. He also represented Udon Thani Province as a Member of the House of Representatives from 1983 to 2000.

== Early life and career ==
Kiattichai Chaichaowarat was born on 11 December 1938 in Udon Thani Province, Thailand. He is the son of Siangheng Chaichaowarat, and his wife, Hong Chaichaowarat. He graduated and received a Bachelor of Business Administration from University of the South Pacific in the United States.

Kiattichai started his political career when he represented Udon Thani, where he was first elected to the House of Representatives as a Member of Parliament in the 1983 Thai general election under the party of Social Action Party. He got re-elected to Parliament six times representing Udon Thani across major election cycles in 1983, 1986, March 1992, September 1992, 1995, and 1996, for the prime ministers Chuan Leekpai, Banharn Silpa-Archa, and Chavalit Yongchaiyudh.

== Personal life and death ==
Kiattichai was married to Laksana Chaichaowarat. He died in Udon Thani Province on 22 August 2026, at the age of 87.

== Royal decorations ==
- 1994 – Knight Grand Cordon of the Most Noble Order of the Order of the Crown of Thailand
- 1995 – Knight Commander (Special Class) of the Most Exalted Order of the White Elephant
