= 2005 in Thailand =

- Decades: 1980s; 1990s; 2000s; 2010s; 2020s
- See also: Other events of 2005; Timeline of Thai history

The year 2005 was the 224th year of the Rattanakosin Kingdom of Thailand. It was the 60th year in the reign of King Bhumibol Adulyadej (Rama IX), and is reckoned as year 2548 in the Buddhist Era. The year saw the re-election of Prime Minister Thaksin Shinawatra to his second term in office, becoming the first democratically elected prime minister to complete a four-year term.

== Incumbents ==
- King: Bhumibol Adulyadej
- Crown Prince: Vajiralongkorn
- Prime Minister: Thaksin Shinawatra
- Supreme Patriarch: Nyanasamvara Suvaddhana

== Events ==
=== February ===
- 2005 Thai general election was held on February 6. Prime Minister Thaksin Shinawatra won the election.

=== March ===
- Miss Thailand Universe 2005 took place on March 26. Chananporn Rosjan was the winner.

=== April ===
- 2005 Songkhla bombings took place on April 3.

== See also ==
- 2005 Thailand national football team results
- Miss Thailand Universe 2005
- 2005 Thailand Open (tennis)
- 2005 in Thai television
- List of Thai films of 2005
