= 2003 in Thailand =

- Decades: 1980s; 1990s; 2000s; 2010s; 2020s
- See also: Other events of 2003; Timeline of Thai history

The year 2003 was the 222nd year of the Rattanakosin Kingdom of Thailand. It was the 58th year in the reign of King Bhumibol Adulyadej (Rama IX), and is reckoned as year 2546 in the Buddhist Era. The war on drugs of Thaksin Shinawatra's government was launched this year, resulting in almost 3,000 deaths.

== Incumbents ==
- King: Bhumibol Adulyadej
- Crown Prince: Vajiralongkorn
- Prime Minister: Thaksin Shinawatra
- Supreme Patriarch: Nyanasamvara Suvaddhana

== Events ==
=== January ===
- 2003 Bangkok International Film Festival took place from January 10 to 21 in Bangkok. A list of award winners can be viewed here

=== June ===
- Pak Phanang school shooting took place on June 6 at Pak Phanang school in Nakhon Si Thammarat.

=== October ===
- October 20–21 APEC Thailand 2003 took place in Bangkok, Thailand.

== Births ==
- Theerapong Silachai - weightlifter

== See also ==
- 2003 Thailand national football team results
- Miss Thailand Universe 2003
- 2003 Thailand Open (tennis)
- 2003 in Thai television
- List of Thai films of 2003
