= 2009 in Thailand =

- Decades: 1980s; 1990s; 2000s; 2010s; 2020s
- See also: Other events of 2009; Timeline of Thai history

The year 2009 was the 228th year of the Rattanakosin Kingdom of Thailand. It was the 64th year in the reign of King Bhumibol Adulyadej (Rama IX) and reckoned as year 2552 in the Buddhist Era.

== Incumbents ==
- King: Bhumibol Adulyadej
- Crown Prince: Vajiralongkorn
- Prime Minister: Abhisit Vejjajiva
- Supreme Patriarch: Nyanasamvara Suvaddhana

== Events ==
=== February ===
- Sao Saw Et riot broke out against a scheduled pride parade in Chiang Mai. The event was eventually cancelled.

=== March ===
- Miss Thailand Universe 2009 was held in Bangkok. Chutima Durongdej won the beauty pageant.

=== April ===
- 2009 Thai political unrest ended in April. Protesters were criticizing the government.

=== May ===
- 2009 Asian Wrestling Championships were held in Pattaya from May 2 to May 7.

=== June ===
- 2009 Thailand standoff took place in Yala, Thailand on June 27.

=== July ===
- 30 July: Death Happens, a Thai language horror film is released.

=== October ===
- 2009 PTT Thailand Open ended on October 4. Giles Simon won the singles tournament and Eric Butorac and Rajeev Ram won the doubles tournament.
- Thai Port F.C. won the 2009 Thai FA Cup Final on October 23.

== See also ==
- 2009 Thai Premier League
- 2009 Thai Division 1 League
- 2009 in Thai football
- 2009 Thai political unrest
- 2009 Thailand national football team results
- 2009 Thailand National Games
