= 2006 in Thailand =

- Decades: 1980s; 1990s; 2000s; 2010s; 2020s
- See also: Other events of 2006; Timeline of Thai history

The year 2006 was the 225th year of the Rattanakosin Kingdom of Thailand. It was the 61st year of the reign of King Bhumibol Adulyadej (Rama IX) and is reckoned as the year 2549 in the Buddhist Era. Major events include the celebration of King Bhumibol's Diamond Jubilee, and the intensification of the 2005–06 Thai political crisis, which culminated in a coup d'état on 19 September.

== Incumbents ==
- King: Bhumibol Adulyadej
- Crown Prince: Vajiralongkorn
- Prime Minister:
  - until 5 April: Thaksin Shinawatra
  - 5 April-23 May: Chitchai Wannasathit (acting)
  - 23 May-19 September: Thaksin Shinawatra
  - 19 September-1 October: Council for National Security (junta)
  - starting 1 October: Surayud Chulanont
- Supreme Patriarch: Nyanasamvara Suvaddhana

== Events ==
=== April ===
- 2006 Thai general election took place in April; elections took place for the House of Representatives of Thailand and for the Senate of Thailand. Thaksin Shinawatra won the election to be the next prime minister, but decided to resign two days afterward.

=== June ===
- 9 June – 60th Anniversary Celebrations of Bhumibol Adulyadej's Accession

=== September ===
- 17 September - The HTMS Kut sinks off the coast of Pattaya and becomes an artificial reef.
- 19 September – 2006 Thai coup d'état: Prime Minister Taksin Shinawatra is deposed by the Royal Thai Army. The new Council for National Security was led by Sonthi Boonyaratglin with Surayud Chulanont as the new prime minister

=== December ===
- 2006 Bangkok bombings took place on December 31, 2006 and January 1, 2007. Almost 40 people were injured.

== See also ==
- 2006 Thailand national football team results
- 2006 Thailand National Games
- Miss Thailand Universe 2006
- 2006 Thailand Open (tennis)
- 2006 in Thai television
- List of Thai films of 2006
