= 2008 in Thailand =

- Decades: 1980s; 1990s; 2000s; 2010s; 2020s
- See also: Other events of 2008; Timeline of Thai history

The year 2008 was the 227th year of the Rattanakosin Kingdom of Thailand. It was the 63rd year in the reign of King Bhumibol Adulyadej (Rama IX), and is reckoned as year 2551 in the Buddhist Era. Much of the year was spent under the 2008 Thai political crisis, which saw political protests leading to the dissolution of the ruling People's Power Party by the Constitutional Court.

== Incumbents ==
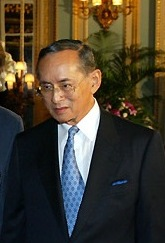
King
Bhumibol Adulyadej

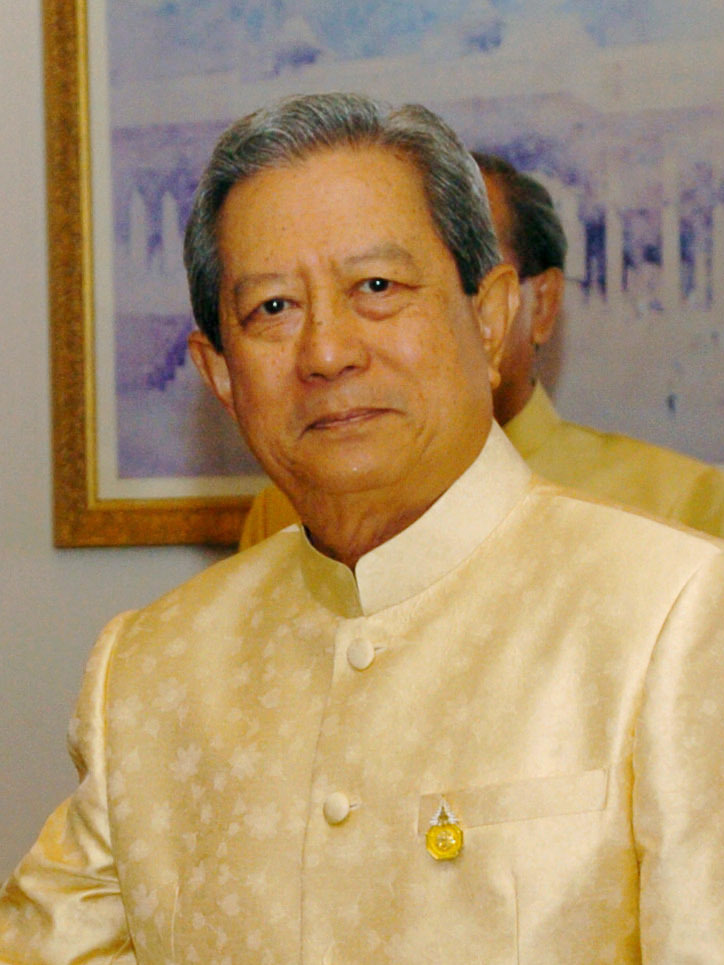
Surayut Chulanon

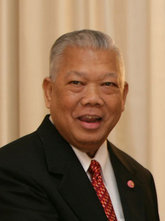
Samak Sundaravej

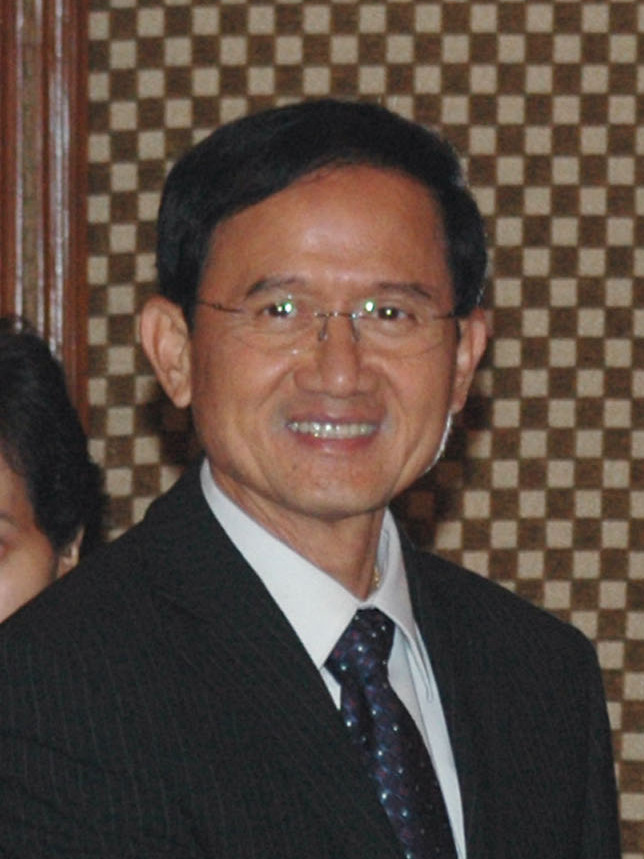
Somchai Wongsawat

- King: Bhumibol Adulyadej
- Crown Prince: Vajiralongkorn
- Prime Minister:
  - until 29 January: Surayud Chulanont
  - 29 January-8 September: Samak Sundaravej
  - 18 September-2 December: Somchai Wongsawat
  - 2 December-15 December: Chaovarat Chanweerakul (acting)
  - starting 17 December: Abhisit Vejjajiva
- Supreme Patriarch: Nyanasamvara Suvaddhana

== Events ==
=== January ===
- January 28 - Parliament chooses People's Power Party leader Samak Sundaravej as Prime-minister-elect.
- 2008 ASEAN ParaGames took place from January 20 to 26.

=== February ===
- February 28 - After returning from exile, former Prime-minister Thaksin Shinawatra is taken into police custody.

=== March ===
- 2008 Thai Senate election took place on March 2.

=== April ===
- Ranong human-trafficking incident took place on April 8. There were 54 reported deaths.

=== May ===
- May 4 - Itthiphol Khunpluem wins the mayoral election in Pattaya, becoming mayor of Pattaya.
- May 25 - Protests in Bangkok are organized by the People's Alliance for Democracy, who oppose a planned constitutional change which will protect Thaksin from corruption charges. These protestors become known as the 'Yellow Shirts' due to their predominant yellow clothing.

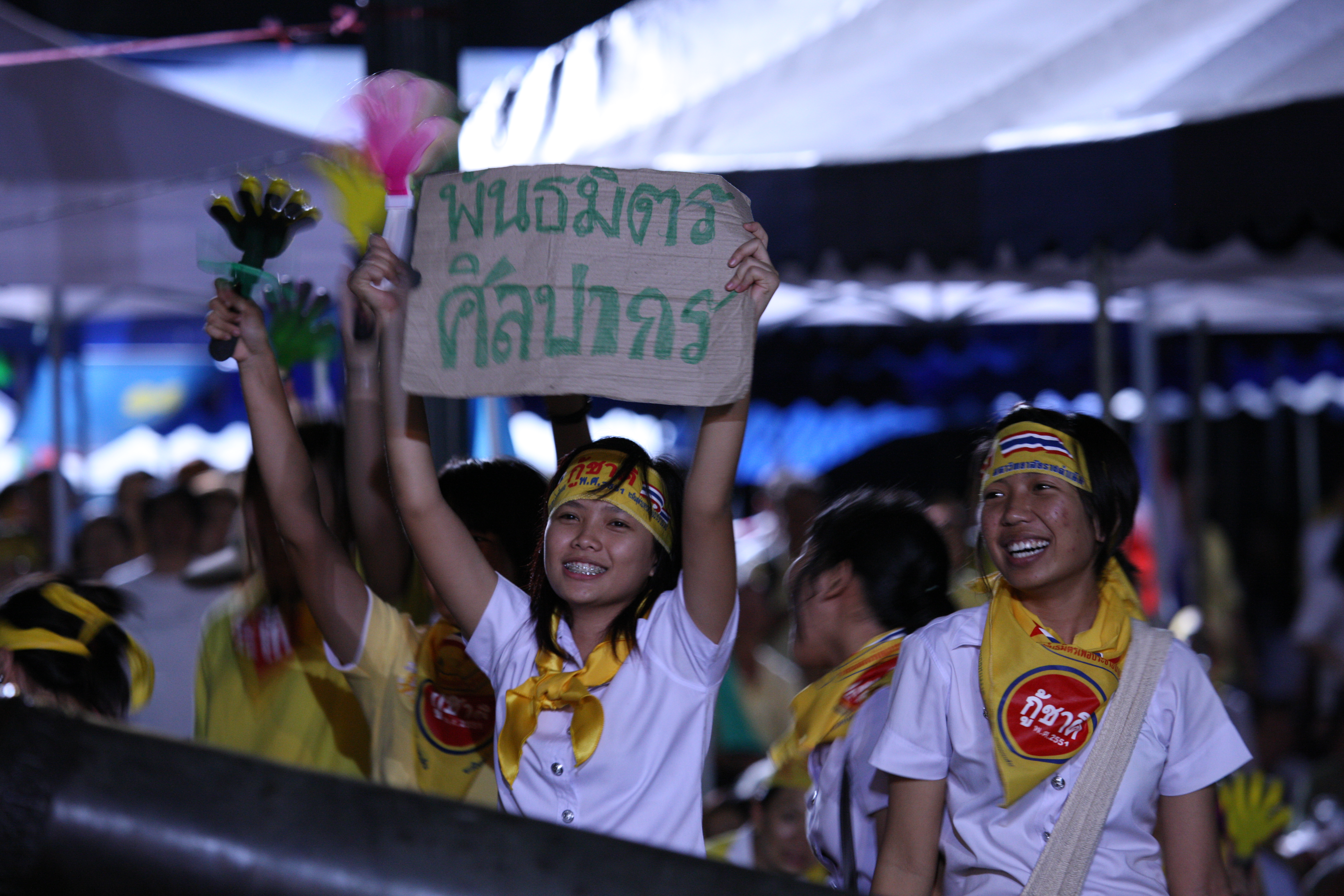
Yellow Shirts protesting

=== August ===
- August 2 – Murder of Khuan Phokaeng: An 18-year-old high school student murdered a taxi driver in Bangkok during a robbery attempt caused by his obsession with the video game Grand Theft Auto.

=== September ===
- September 9 - The Constitutional Court fires Prime-minister Samak Sundaravej over his wishes to continue holding a cooking show he had been hosting since 2006 called Tasting, Ranting. Due to it being illegal for a sitting Prime-minister to hold any other paying job, he was fired after finding it unconstitutional for him to work for Thailand ITV.
- September 17 - Thai lawmakers elect the deputy leader of the ruling People's Power Party and Thaksin's brother-in-law, Somchai Wongsawat as Prime-minister of Thailand.

=== October ===
- 2008 Bangkok gubernatorial election was held on October 5. Incumbent Governor Apirak Kosayothin won the election.
- October 21 - Thaksin is convicted of corruption over a land deal when he was still in office, and is sentenced to two years.

=== November ===
- November 22 - Thai and Australian law enforcement size 192 kilograms of drugs destined for Australia.
- November 25 - Yellow Shirt protesters seize Don Mueang and Suvarnabhumi airports. Hundreds of flights are cancelled whilst thousands of tourists are left stranded in Suvarnabhumi airport - the country's main international airport. Many flights were re-directed to U-Tapao airport in Rayong, while others were led to hotels in Bangkok or Pattaya.
- November 27 - Prime-minister Somchai declares a state of emergency after Don Mueang and Suvarnabhumi airports are occupied by Yellow Shirts.
- November 28 - Due to chaos in Bangkok's airport, Phuket's King's Cup was announced to be dalayed to begin on December 2.
- November 29 - Ambassadors of the European Union issued a joint-statement against the anti-government demonstrators (Yellow Shirtst). The governor of Phuket, Preecha Ruangjan, issues a statement that urges police to crack down on prostitution.

=== December ===
- December 2 - The Constitutional court dissolves the People's Power Party after finding electoral fraud in the 2007 election.
- December 15 - Parliament chooses opposition leader of the Democrat Party, Abhisit Vejjajiva, as the new Prime-minister.

== Deaths ==
- November 23 - Tom McNamara, founder of Baan Rim Pa, in Phuket

== See also ==
- 2008 Thai political crisis
- 2008 Thailand national football team results
- 2008 Thailand National Games
- 2008 in Thai television
- List of Thai films of 2008
