= Carlos Ferreira =

Carlos Ferreira may refer to:

- Carlos Amaral Ferreira, Portuguese Paralympic athlete
- Carlos Ferreira (sailor) (born 1931), Portuguese former sailor
- Carlos Vaz Ferreira (1872–1958), Uruguayan philosopher, writer, and academic
- Carlos Diego Ferreira (born 1985), Brazilian mixed martial artist
- Carlos Ferreira (footballer) (born 1980), Luxembourgian footballer
- Carlos Ferreira de la Torre (1914–1990), Spanish sculptor
- Sebastián Ferreira, also known as Carlos Sebastián Ferreira, (born 1998), Paraguayan footballer
