= Sanoh Thienthong =

Thai politician (born 1934)

Sanoh Thienthong MPCh MWM PPh
- เสนาะ เทียนทอง
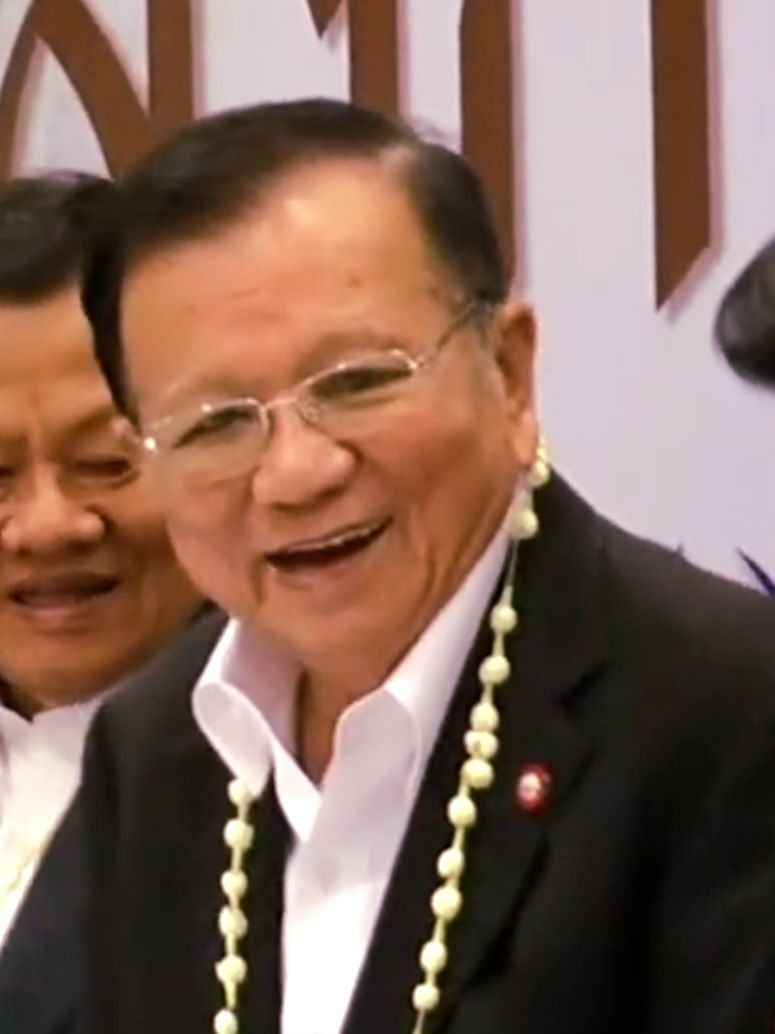

Minister of Interior
- In office 29 November 1996 – 8 November 1997
- Prime Minister: Chavalit Yongchaiyudh
- Preceded by: Banharn Silpa-archa
- Succeeded by: Sanan Kachornprasart

Secretary-general of Thai Nation Party
- In office 17 May 1994 – 31 December 1996
- Preceded by: Banharn Silpa-archa
- Succeeded by: Pongpol Adireksarn

Minister of Public Health
- In office 13 July 1995 – 24 November 1996
- Prime Minister: Banharn Silpa-archa
- Preceded by: Arthit Ourairat
- Succeeded by: Montri Pongpanich

Personal details
- Born: 1 April 1934 (age 92) Prachinburi, Thailand
- Party: Pheu Thai (since 2011); Pracharaj (2006–2011); Thai Rak Thai (2001–2006); New Aspiration (1996–2001); Thai Nation (1975–1996)
- Spouse: Uraiwan Thienthong
- Education: Sripatum University
- Profession: Lawyer; politician

Military service
- Allegiance: Thailand
- Branch/service: Volunteer Defense Corps
- Rank: VDC Gen.

Sanoh Thienthong (Thai: เสนาะ เทียนทอง, RTGS: Sano Thianthong; born 1 April 1934) is a Thai politician. He is a Member of Parliament for the Pheu Thai Party list. Before he joined the Pheu Thai Party in 2011, he was the leader of the minor Pracharaj Party. Earlier functions include Minister of Public Health and Interior Minister. Sanoh played a supporting role in the rise to premiership of Banharn Silpa-archa, Chavalit Yongchaiyudh, Thaksin Shinawatra and Surayud Chulanont

== Education and family ==
Sanoh was born into a Thai Chinese business family involved in the lumber industry. He graduated with a Bachelor of Laws degree from the Sripatum University. He is married with Uraiwan Thienthong, who is also a politician. They have six children together. Among them are Sorawong Thienthong, who is an MP for Sa Kaeo and Surachat Thienthong, who is an MP for Bangkok, after having been product manager for Thai Beverage, the producer of Beer Chang. Sanoh's nephew and niece, Thanit and Trinuch Thienthong, are both MPs for Sa Kaeo. Moreover, Thanit serves as a Deputy Interior Minister in Yingluck Shinawatra's cabinet. Sanoh's brother Witthaya was a long-term MP for Sa Kaeo as well (since 1996, all three Sa Kaeo seats in the House of Representatives have been controlled by members of the Thienthong family), while his sister Kwanruan was a member of the Senate in 2006.

== Political career ==
Sanoh has an influential trucking business, his home district being located near an important checkpoint at the Thai-Cambodian border. Sanoh entered politics with the Thai Nation Party in 1975. One year later, he was elected to parliament representing Prachinburi Province which at the time still contained today's Sa Kaeo Province. From 1986 to 1988, he was Deputy Minister of Agriculture and, for a short phase of less than two months in 1992, Deputy Minister of Transport. When Banharn Silpa-archa became leader of the Thai Nation Party in 1994, he made Sanoh secretary-general. The following year, Banharn became Prime Minister and called up Sanoh to the government, appointing him Minister of Public Health.

In 1996, Sanoh resigned from the Thai Nation Party and joined the New Aspiration Party of Chavalit Yongchaiyudh, and immediately took up the position of secretary-general. After Chavalit had won the election and become Prime Minister, he made Sanoh Minister of the Interior. As a minister, Sanoh Thienthong is said to have coined the term Ya ba ("madness drug") instead of "Ya ma" ("horse drug") for the mix of methamphetamine and caffeine which used to be prevalent in Thailand.

For the election in 2001, he changed to the Thai Rak Thai Party (TRT) of Thaksin Shinawatra. Sanoh was made chief adviser of the party. He was not given a government office, but his wife Uraiwan was appointed minister. Alternately, she led the Ministries of Culture and Labour. Inside the Thai Rak Thai Party, Sanoh led a faction called the "Wang Nam Yen group", named after Sanoh's home district. In 2004, around 70 MPs, mainly from the Northeastern region were affiliated with this group.

After discord with Thaksin, Sanoh Thienthong left TRT on 25 February 2006. After Thaksin had dissolved the parliament, Sanoh spoke at several rallies of the People's Alliance for Democracy (PAD, or "Yellow Shirts"), an anti-Thaksin pressure group. He formed a new party, called Pracharaj Party (Royalist People's Party). Sanoh became leader of the party which declared political reform and the removal of the Thaksin regime as its aims.

On 13 May 2011, he abandoned his Pracharaj Party to join the Pheu Thai Party. He supported the top candidature of Yingluck Shinawatra and on 5 August, it was Sanoh who proposed her election as Prime Minister to the parliament.

Sanoh Thienthong, who has the reputation of a behind-the-scenes powerbroker and king-maker, has been dubbed "Godfather of Wang Nam Yen", or "Godfather of the eastern border"

== Decorations ==
- Knight Grand Cordon (Special Class) of the Order of the White Elephant (1986)
- Knight Grand Cordon (Special Class) of the Order of the Crown of Thailand (1994)
- Knight Grand Cross (First Class) of the Order of the Direkgunabhorn (1997)
