= 1997 in Thailand =

- Decades: 1970s; 1980s; 1990s; 2000s; 2010s
- See also: Other events of 1997; Timeline of Thai history

The year 1997 was the 216th year of the Rattanakosin Kingdom of Thailand. It was the 52nd year of the reign of King Bhumibol Adulyadej (Rama IX) and is reckoned as the year 2540 in the Buddhist Era. It is most significantly marked by the 1997 Asian financial crisis, which began when the Bank of Thailand floated the baht on 2 July, as well as the promulgation of the 1997 constitution of Thailand.

== Incumbents ==
- King: Bhumibol Adulyadej
- Crown Prince: Vajiralongkorn
- Prime Minister:
  - until 9 November: Chavalit Yongchaiyudh
  - starting 9 November: Chuan Leekpai
- Supreme Patriarch: Nyanasamvara Suvaddhana

== Events ==
- 14–15 May – the Thai baht is hit by a massive speculative attack, triggering the 1997 Asian financial crisis
- 2 July – the Bank of Thailand floats the baht, leading to rapid devaluation
- 11 October – Promulgation of the Constitution of the Kingdom of Thailand B.E. 2540
- 1 November – Thai Sky TV Station Broadcasting ceased at 6:00 AM.
- 6 November – General Chavalit Yongchaiyudh submits a letter of resignation from the position of Prime Minister.
- 9 November – Chuan Leekpai assumes the position of Prime Minister for a second term, following General Chavalit Yongchaiyudh.
