= 2004 in Thailand =

- Decades: 1980s; 1990s; 2000s; 2010s; 2020s
- See also: Other events of 2004; Timeline of Thai history

The year 2004 was the 223rd year of the Rattanakosin Kingdom of Thailand. It was the 59th year in the reign of King Bhumibol Adulyadej (Rama IX), and is reckoned as year 2547 in the Buddhist Era.

== Incumbents ==
- King: Bhumibol Adulyadej
- Crown Prince: Vajiralongkorn
- Prime Minister: Thaksin Shinawatra
- Supreme Patriarch: Nyanasamvara Suvaddhana

== Events ==
=== January ===
- 2004 Bangkok International Film Festival took place from January 22 to February 2. Many awards were given out. A list of awards given out can be viewed here.

=== March ===
- Miss Thailand Universe 2004 was a beauty contest held on March 27. Morakot Aimee Kittisara was the winner.

=== June ===
- The New World Department Store partially collapses on 2 June while undergoing demolition of illegally built floors, severely injuring two people, one of whom dies in hospital.

=== July ===
- XV International AIDS Conference, 2004 was held from July 11 to July 16 in Bangkok.

=== August ===
- 2004 Bangkok gubernatorial election was held on August 29. Apirak Kosayodhin, who belonged to the Democrat party, won the election.

=== October ===
- Tak Bai incident occurred on October 25 and resulted in 85 deaths.

=== December ===
- 2004 Indian Ocean earthquake and tsunami occurred on December 26.

== Deaths ==
- 26 December - Poom Jensen

== See also ==
- List of Thai films of 2004
- 2004 in Thai television
- 2004 Thailand national football team results
- 2004 Thailand National Games
- Miss Thailand Universe 2004
- 2004 ASEAN Football Championship
- 2004 Thailand Open (tennis)
