= 1996 in Thailand =

- Decades: 1970s; 1980s; 1990s; 2000s; 2010s
- See also: Other events of 1996; Timeline of Thai history

The year 1996 was the 215th year of the Rattanakosin Kingdom of Thailand. It was the 51st year of the reign of King Bhumibol Adulyadej (Rama IX) and is reckoned as the year 2539 in the Buddhist Era. Major events include the Golden Jubilee of Bhumibol Adulyadej

== Incumbents ==
- King: Bhumibol Adulyadej
- Crown Prince: Vajiralongkorn
- Prime Minister:
  - until 25 November: Banharn Silpa-Archa
  - starting 25 November: Chavalit Yongchaiyudh
- Supreme Patriarch: Nyanasamvara Suvaddhana

== Event ==
=== June ===
- 9 June - Golden Jubilee of Bhumibol Adulyadej

=== November ===
- 25-26 November - His Majesty King Bhumibol Adulyadej welcomes U.S. President Bill Clinton for a State Visit.

== Births ==
- May 5 - Naphat Siangsomboon, actor and model
- June 6 - Chanon Santinatornkul, actor and model
- December 8 - Jakarin Puribhat, actor

== See also ==
- 1996 in Thai television
- List of Thai films of 1996
