= 1995 in Thailand =

- Decades: 1970s; 1980s; 1990s; 2000s; 2010s
- See also: Other events of 1995; Timeline of Thai history

The year 1995 was the 214th year of the Rattanakosin Kingdom of Thailand. It was the 50th year of the reign of King Bhumibol Adulyadej (Rama IX) and is reckoned as the year 2538 in the Buddhist Era.

== Incumbents ==
- King: Bhumibol Adulyadej
- Crown Prince Vajiralongkorn
- Prime Minister:
  - until 19 May: Chuan Leekpai
  - starting 19 May: Banharn Silpa-Archa
- Supreme Patriarch: Nyanasamvara Suvaddhana

== Events ==
- 9 December–17 December – The Southeast Asian Games are held in Chiang Mai.

== Births ==
- 4 January – Sarin Ronnakiat, actor
- 15 February – Engfa Waraha, singer, actress, MC and beauty queen
- 5 July – Phataimas Muenwong, badminton player
- 12 July – Suporn Peenagatapho, footballer
- 8 August – Netiporn Sanesangkhom, political activist (d. 2024)
- 17 October – Abdulhafiz Bueraheng, footballer
- 5 November – Pimnitchakun Bumrungkit, actress

== Deaths ==
- 18 July - Srinagarindra Thai Princess Mother (b. 1900)

== Audio ==
https://archive.org/details/track-02_202311
