= 2009 Thai by-elections =

2009 Thailand parliamentary by-elections
- 11 January 2009

26 of 500 seats to the House of Representatives of Thailand
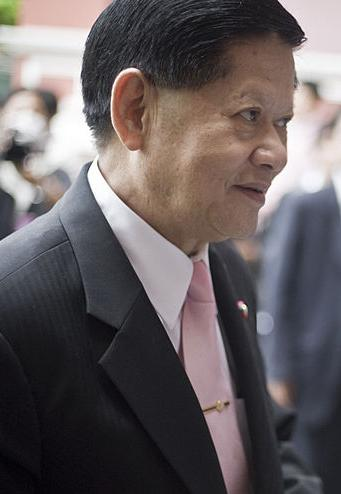

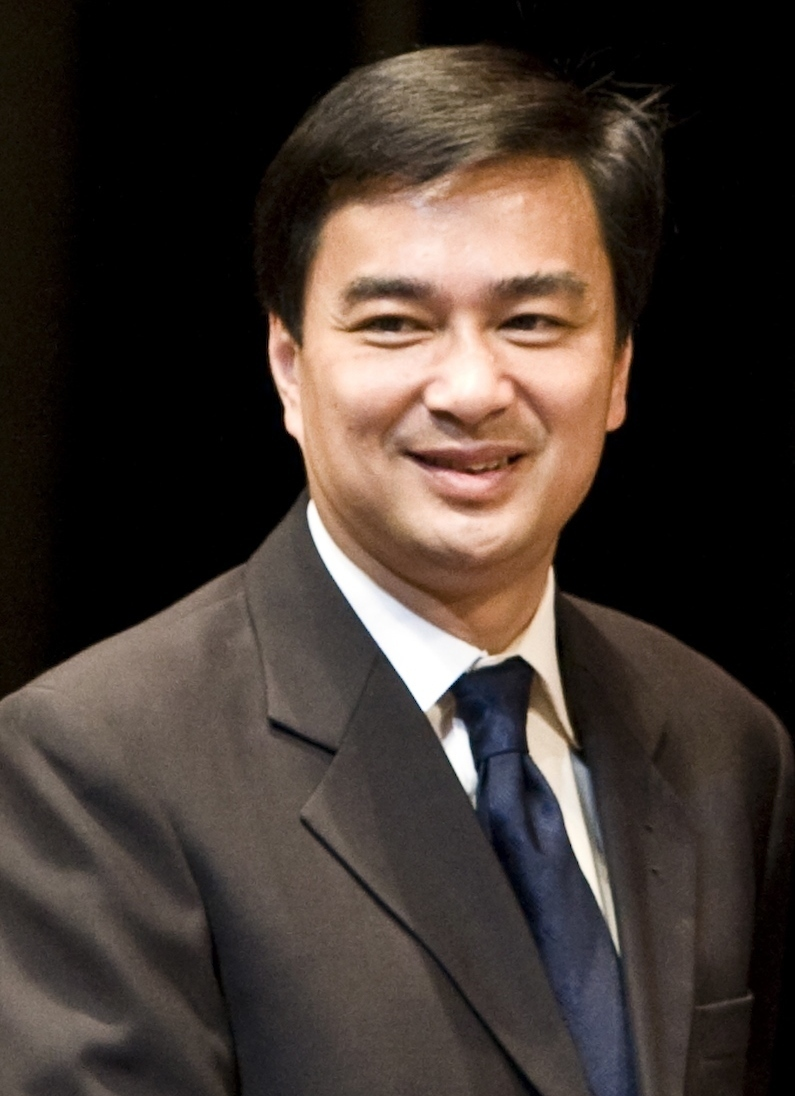
	First party	Second party
Leader	Chumpol Silpa-archa	Abhisit Vejjajiva
Party	Chartthaipattana Party	Democrat
Seats won	10	7

By-elections were held in Thailand on 11 January 2009. The elections were held to fill 26 vacant parliamentary seats. elected by the first past the post voting system.

== Results ==
Party	Bangkok	South	North	North-east	Central	Total
Chartthaipattana Party	-	1	-	1	8	10
Democrat	1	-	1	-	5	7
Pheu Thai	-	-	1	4	-	5
Pracharaj	-	-	-	3	1	4
Puea Pandin Party	-	-	-	2	1	3
Total	1	1	2	10	15	29
Source: Election of Members of House of Representatives B.E.2552

=== North-East ===
==== Nakhon Panom Constituency 1 by-election ====
Party	Candidate	Votes	%
Pheu Thai	Suriya Promdee	48,661	33.13
Puea Pandin Party	Sumali Poonsirikul	47,172	32.11
Pracharaj	Chaiabhisitpao Kamkornruecha	37,599	25.60
New Aspiration	Gomol Hempolchom	2,413	1.64

==== Udontani Constituency 2 by-election ====
Party	Candidate	Vote	%
Pheu Thai	Kiatudom Menasawat	87,477	53.92
Puea Pandin Party	Nathakamol Nonthachot	68,282	44.10
Public People Party	Bunchan Morapat	3,063	1.98

==== Ubolratchatani Constituency 2 by-election ====
Party	Candidate	Vote	%
Puea Pandin Party	Udon Thongprasert	86,690	50.63
Pheu Thai	Sukumrat Salibud	48,667	28.43
Chartthaipattana Party	Pinij Chaitani	33,718	19.69

==== Ubolratchatani Constituency 3 by-election ====
Party	Candidate	Vote	%
Chartthaipattana Party	Udon Jintavej	92,078	52.25
Pheu Thai	Kittipong Tiamsuwan	74,062	42.03
Voice of People	Suriyapan Pakdilon	7,518	4.27

==== Buri Lam Constituency 2 by-election ====
Party	Candidate	Vote	%
Pracharaj	Jakkrit Thongsri	84,673	61.81
Pheu Thai	Jamrus Viangsong	41,903	30.59
Prachachat Thai	Athiwat Boonchat	10,414	7.60

==== Buri Lam Constituency 4 by-election ====
Party	Candidate	Vote	%
Puea Pandin Party	Peerapong Hengsawat	66,180	52.31
Chartthaipattana Party	Jetiya Liangpongpan	55,524	43.89
Pracharaj	Suthatchai Kamolthaisong	4,805	3.80

==== Mahasarakam Constituency 1 by-election ====
Party	Candidate	Vote	%
Pheu Thai	Kachit Chainikom	74,059	39.47
Puea Pandin Party	Kusumalavadee Sirikomud	50,934	27.15
Pracharaj	Aphirach Bannarak	49,470	26.37

==== Roi Et Constituency 1 by-election ====
Party	Candidate	Vote	%
Pheu Thai	Piyarat Muensan	109,601	58.72
Puea Pandin Party	Ratchanee Polsaue	74,539	39.93
New Aspiration	Sunitsa Vetsuwan	2,521	1.35

==== Srisaket Constituency 1 by-election ====
Party	Candidate	Vote	%
Pracharaj	Suta Promdung	66,402	47.02
Puea Pandin Party	Sakulthip Angsakulleard	50,823	35.98
New Aspiration	Chaiyong Ratanawan	24,009	17.00

==== Srisaket Constituency 2 by-election ====
Party	Candidate	Vote	%
Pracharaj	Jirawadee Jungvaranon	88,612	52.55
Ruamjaithai Chatpattana	Malinee Inchat	80,003	47.45

=== North ===
==== Lampang Constituency 1 by-election ====
Party	Candidate	Vote	%	Note
Pheu Thai	Somphot Saithep	95,602	50.99	
Democrat	Mattayom Nipakasem	91,888	49.01	
Public People	Sin Prasatthai	0	0	Disqualify

==== Lampun Constituency 1 by-election ====
Party	Candidate	Vote	%
Democrat	Kayan Vipromchai	85,828	43.53
Pheu Thai	Phetcharavat Wattanapongsirikul	74,535	37.75
Puea Pandin Party	Apaporn Phuttapuan	19,984	10.14

=== ฺCentral ===
==== Bangkok Constituency 10 by-election ====
Party	Candidate	Vote	%
Democrat	Nattapong Thepsuwan	72,909	47.1
Pheu Thai	Charuwong Ruengsuwan	52,243	34.4
Public People	Thanomsak Nuanseth	5,812	3.75

==== Pathumtani Constituency 10 by-election ====
Party	Candidate	Vote	%
Pracharaj	Chanakan Yuenyong	86,078	54.52
Democrat	Apinan Chuybamrong	71,804	45.48

==== Chachoengsao Constituency 1 by-election ====
Party	Candidate	Vote	%
Puea Pandin Party	Natchapol Tanprasert	52,451	52.58
Pheu Thai	Sikarin Chanthasorn	42,042	42.14
Pracharaj	Suthathip Tanprasert	5,267	5.28

==== Nakhon Pathom Constituency 1 by-election ====
Party	Candidate	Vote	%
Democrat	Marut Boonme	104,490	61.48
Pheu Thai	Thanupong Rangsitripong	63,048	37.09
Pracharaj	Saroj Benjasrisawat	2,426	1.43

==== Samut Prakan Constituency 1 by-election ====
Party	Candidate	Vote	%
Democrat	Saracha Veerachatpattana	70,138	55.16
Pheu Thai	Arunlak Kijlerdpairoj	55,170	43.39
Public People	Chokchai Thaipichitburapha	1,848	1.45

==== Saraburi Constituency 2 by-election ====
Party	Candidate	Vote	%
Democrat	Ongat Wongprayoon	72,690	78.73
Puea Pandin Party	Tagoon Chanjamsai	19,636	21.27

==== Singburi Constituency 1 by-election ====
Party	Candidate	Vote	%
Democrat	Chotwut Thanakamanusorn	51,940	48.70
Pheu Thai	Payab Banket	46,909	43.98

==== Ratchaburi Constituency 1 by-election ====
Party	Candidate	Vote	%
Democrat	Yodsak Chivawinyu	144,199	72.69
Pheu Thai	Decha Tulathan	37,190	18.75

==== Lopburi Constituency 1 by-election ====
Party	Candidate	Vote	%
Chartthaipattana Party	Mallika Jirapanvanich	104,968	63.79
Pheu Thai	Prasong Sornmana	41,317	27.46
Public People	Thaipat Prajinkiat	4,210	2.80

==== Suphanburi Constituency 1 by-election ====
Party	Candidate	Vote	%
Chartthaipattana Party	Noppadon Matsri	137,866	31.15
Chartthaipattana Party	Chanchai Prasertsuwan	132,760	30.00
Chartthaipattana Party	Nitiwat Chansawang	129,808	29.33

==== Suphanburi Constituency 2 by-election ====
Party	Candidate	Vote	%
Chartthaipattana Party	Patchari Chantasuthon	108,451	43.81
Chartthaipattana Party	Jeracha Tiangtham	103,746	41.91
New Aspiration	Thaipat Prajinkiat	11,397	4.6

==== Angthong Constituency 1 by-election ====
Party	Candidate	Vote	%
Chartthaipattana Party	Pakin Prisananantakul	72,380	58.27
Pheu Thai	Penchisa Honguppthamchai	36,930	29.73
Farmer National Network	Suvapat Polkang	2,923	2.35

==== Uthaitani Constituency 1 by-election ====
Party	Candidate	Vote	%
Chartthaipattana Party	Adul Luengsomboon	81,442	64.51
Pracharaj	Karundech Phuapattanakul	30,757	24.37

=== South ===
==== Narathiwat Constituency 2 by-election ====
Party	Candidate	Vote	%
Chartthaipattana Party	Niaris Jetaphiwat	47,931	54.40
Pracharaj	Abdulachi Hama	28,390	32.22
Ruamjaithai Chatpattana	Muktar Kila	11,748	13.37
