= Chingchai Mongkoltham =

Thai politician

Chingchai Mongkholtham ชิงชัย มงคลธรรม
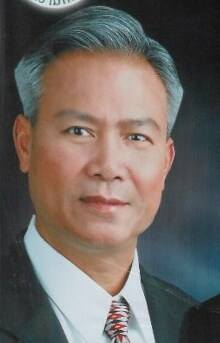

Minister of Education
- In office 15 August 1997 – 6 November 1997
- Prime Minister: Chavalit Yongchaiyudh
- Preceded by: Sukavich Rangsitpol
- Succeeded by: Chumpol Silpa-archa

Personal details
- Born: 24 June 1951 (age 75) Bangkok, Thailand
- Party: New Aspiration Party
- Spouse: Yuvaphan Mongkholtham
- Children: 3
- Education: Mahasarakham University
- Profession: Politician

Chingchai Mongkholtham (Thai: ชิงชัย มงคลธรรม; RTGS: Chingchai Mongkhontham) is a Thai politician and activist currently serving as the leader of New Aspiration Party. He was Minister of Education for three months during 1997 Asian financial crisis. (15/8/1997-8/11/1997)
