= 2002 in Thailand =

- Decades: 1980s; 1990s; 2000s; 2010s; 2020s
- See also: Other events of 2002; Timeline of Thai history

The year 2002 was the 221st year of the Rattanakosin Kingdom of Thailand. It was the 57th year in the reign of King Bhumibol Adulyadej (Rama IX), and is reckoned as year 2545 in the Buddhist Era.

== Incumbents ==
- King: Bhumibol Adulyadej
- Crown Prince: Vajiralongkorn
- Prime Minister: Thaksin Shinawatra
- Supreme Patriarch: Nyanasamvara Suvaddhana

== Events ==
=== March ===
- Miss Thailand Universe 2002 took place on March 23. Janjira Janchome was the winner of the beauty contest.

=== June ===
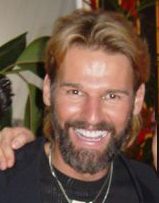
Brian Heidik, winner of Survivor: Thailand

- Survivor: Thailand, a reality television series of Survivor, was filmed from June 10 to July 18 on Ko Tarutao. Brian Heidik was the winner.

=== September ===
- Thailand competed in the 2002 Asian Games, which lasted from September 29 to October 14.

=== December ===
- Thailand began competing in the 2002 Tiger Cup in December. They would eventually win the tournament, which ended on December 29.

== See also ==
- Thailand at the 2002 Asian Games
- 2002 Thailand National Games
- 2002 in Thai television
- List of Thai films of 2002
