= 2000 in Thailand =

- Decades: 1980s; 1990s; 2000s; 2010s; 2020s
- See also: Other events of 2000; Timeline of Thai history

The year 2000 was the 219th year of the Rattanakosin Kingdom of Thailand. It was the 55th year in the reign of King Bhumibol Adulyadej (Rama IX), and is reckoned as year 2543 in the Buddhist Era.

== Incumbents ==
- King: Bhumibol Adulyadej
- Crown prince: Vajiralongkorn
- Prime minister: Chuan Leekpai
- Supreme patriarch: Nyanasamvara Suvaddhana

== Deaths ==
- November 17 - Lek Viriyaphan, businessman and patron of culture (b. 1914)
