= 1999 in Thailand =

- Decades: 1970s; 1980s; 1990s; 2000s; 2010s
- See also: Other events of 1999; Timeline of Thai history

The year 1999 was the 218th year of the Rattanakosin Kingdom of Thailand. It was the 54th year in the reign of King Bhumibol Adulyadej (Rama IX), and is reckoned as year 2542 in the Buddhist Era.

== Incumbents ==
- King: Bhumibol Adulyadej
- Crown Prince: Vajiralongkorn
- Prime Minister: Chuan Leekpai
- Supreme Patriarch: Nyanasamvara Suvaddhana
