= 2007 in Thailand =

- Decades: 1980s; 1990s; 2000s; 2010s; 2020s
- See also: Other events of 2007; Timeline of Thai history

The year 2007 was the 226th year of the Rattanakosin Kingdom of Thailand. It was the 62nd year in the reign of King Bhumibol Adulyadej (Rama IX), and is reckoned as year 2550 in the Buddhist Era.

== Incumbents ==
- King: Bhumibol Adulyadej
- Crown Prince: Vajiralongkorn
- Prime Minister: Surayud Chulanont
- Supreme Patriarch: Nyanasamvara Suvaddhana

== Events ==
=== January ===
- January 1 - Two more bomb blasts strike Bangkok just after midnight, injuring several people, including a foreign tourist whose legs are amputated in the blast. The explosions are near CentralWorld shopping mall, where just hours before thousands of people had gathered for a New Year's Eve countdown celebration and been told to disperse by authorities after seven bombs went off in various parts of the city earlier in the evening.
- January 10 - Thailand's post-coup leaders revoke the diplomatic passport of ousted PM Thaksin Shinawatra and tell local media not to report his comments.
- January 14 - A buddhist man has been beheaded and two others shot in Yala province, Southern Thailand. A handwritten note was found saying "We will kill all Thai Buddhists." Another man was shot dead in a separate attack. A police officer told the Reuters news agency that the note left by the body was signed by a group that called itself the Pattani Fighters, a reference to one of the region's troubled provinces.
- January 14 - A collision between two trains south of Bangkok leaves 3 dead and about 70 injured. A Bangkok-bound train took the wrong track and hit an oncoming service near the resort town of Hua Hin.

=== August ===
- 19 August - A referendum on the new constitution was held in Thailand on 19 August 2007.
- 19 August - Thailand conducted a referendum for the 2007 Constitution of Thailand on August 19. About 56.7% of the people approved the constitution.

=== December ===
- 2007 Southeast Asian Games was held in Nakhon Ratchasima from December 6 to 15.
- 2007 Thai general election took place on December 23. Samak Sundaravej won the election.

== See also ==
- 2007 Thailand national football team results
- 2007 Thailand National Games
- Miss Thailand Universe 2007
- 2007 South Thailand bombings
- 2007 ASEAN Football Championship
- 2007 Thailand Open (tennis)
- 2007 in Thai television
- List of Thai films of 2007
