= 2001 in Thailand =

- Decades: 1980s; 1990s; 2000s; 2010s; 2020s
- See also: Other events of 2001; Timeline of Thai history

The year 2001 was the 220th year of the Rattanakosin Kingdom of Thailand. It was the 56th year in the reign of King Bhumibol Adulyadej (Rama IX), and is reckoned as year 2544 in the Buddhist Era.

== Incumbents ==
- King: Bhumibol Adulyadej
- Crown Prince: Vajiralongkorn
- Prime Minister:
  - until February 9: Chuan Leekpai
  - starting February 9: Thaksin Shinawatra
- Supreme Patriarch: Nyanasamvara Suvaddhana

== Events ==
- January 6 - 2001 Thai general election was held on January 6. Thaksin Shinawatra was elected Prime Minister of Thailand.

== Births ==
- Kunlavut Vitidsarn - Badminton player
