= 1998 in Thailand =

- Decades: 1970s; 1980s; 1990s; 2000s; 2010s
- See also: Other events of 1998; Timeline of Thai history

The year 1998 was the 217th year of the Rattanakosin Kingdom of Thailand. It was the 53rd year in the reign of King Bhumibol Adulyadej (Rama IX), and is reckoned as year 2541 in the Buddhist Era.

== Incumbents ==
- King: Bhumibol Adulyadej
- Crown Prince: Vajiralongkorn
- Prime Minister: Chuan Leekpai
- Supreme Patriarch: Nyanasamvara Suvaddhana

== Events ==
- January–March – The murder of Jenjira Ploy-angunsri, where a female medical student was killed and her body dismembered by her boyfriend, becomes headline news.
- December 6–20 – The 1998 Asian Games are held in Bangkok.
- December 11 – Thai Airways International Flight 261 crashes upon attempted landing at Surat Thani International Airport, killing 101, the second-deadliest air crash in Thailand.

== Births ==
- 11 March – Sahaphap Wongratch, actor
- 3 September - Kanaphan Puitrakul, actor
