= 1996 Thai general election =

- 17 November 1996

All 393 seats in the House of Representatives 197 seats needed for a majority
- Registered: 38,564,593
- Turnout: 62.42% (▲0.38pp)
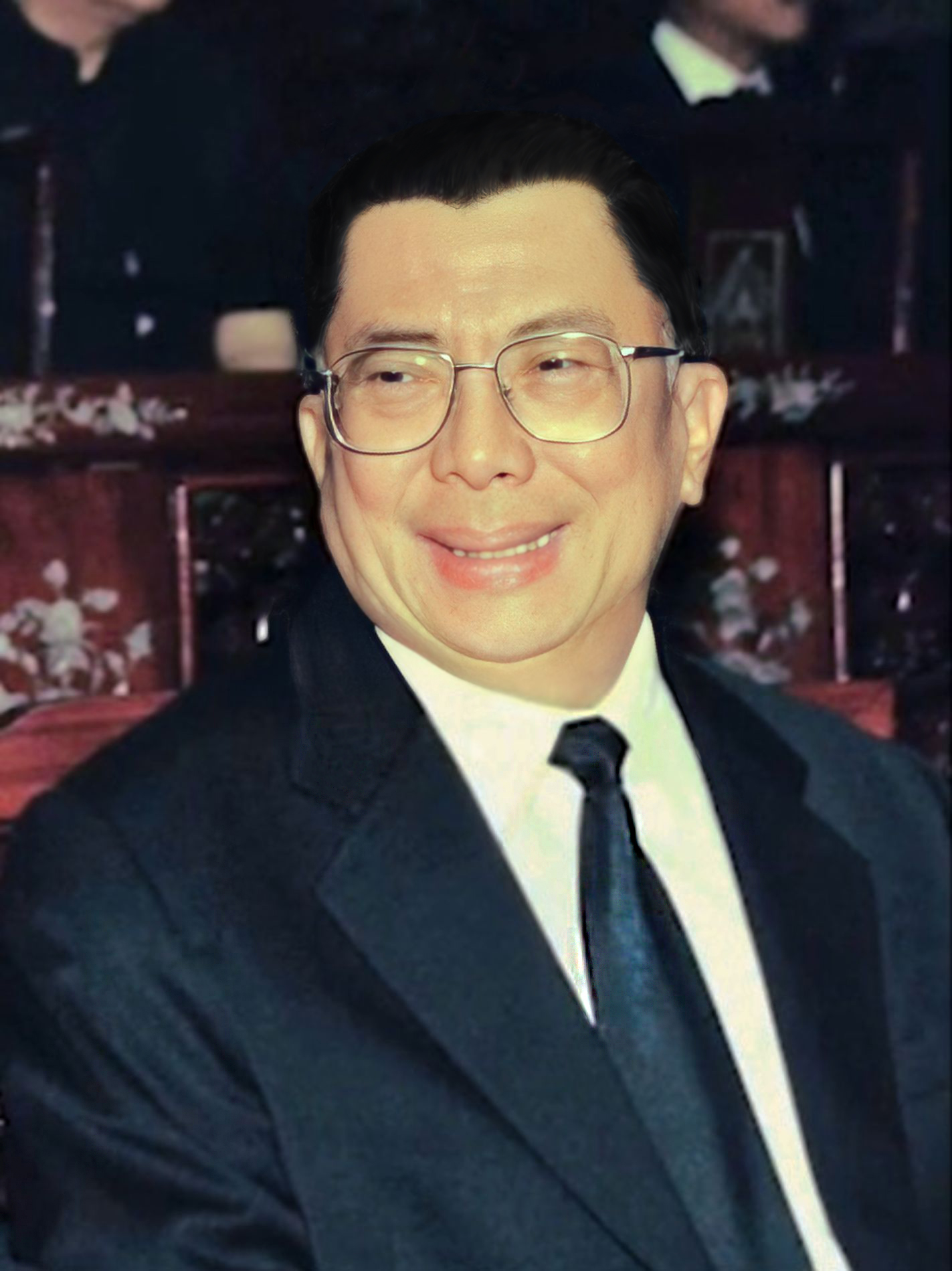

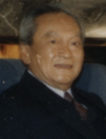

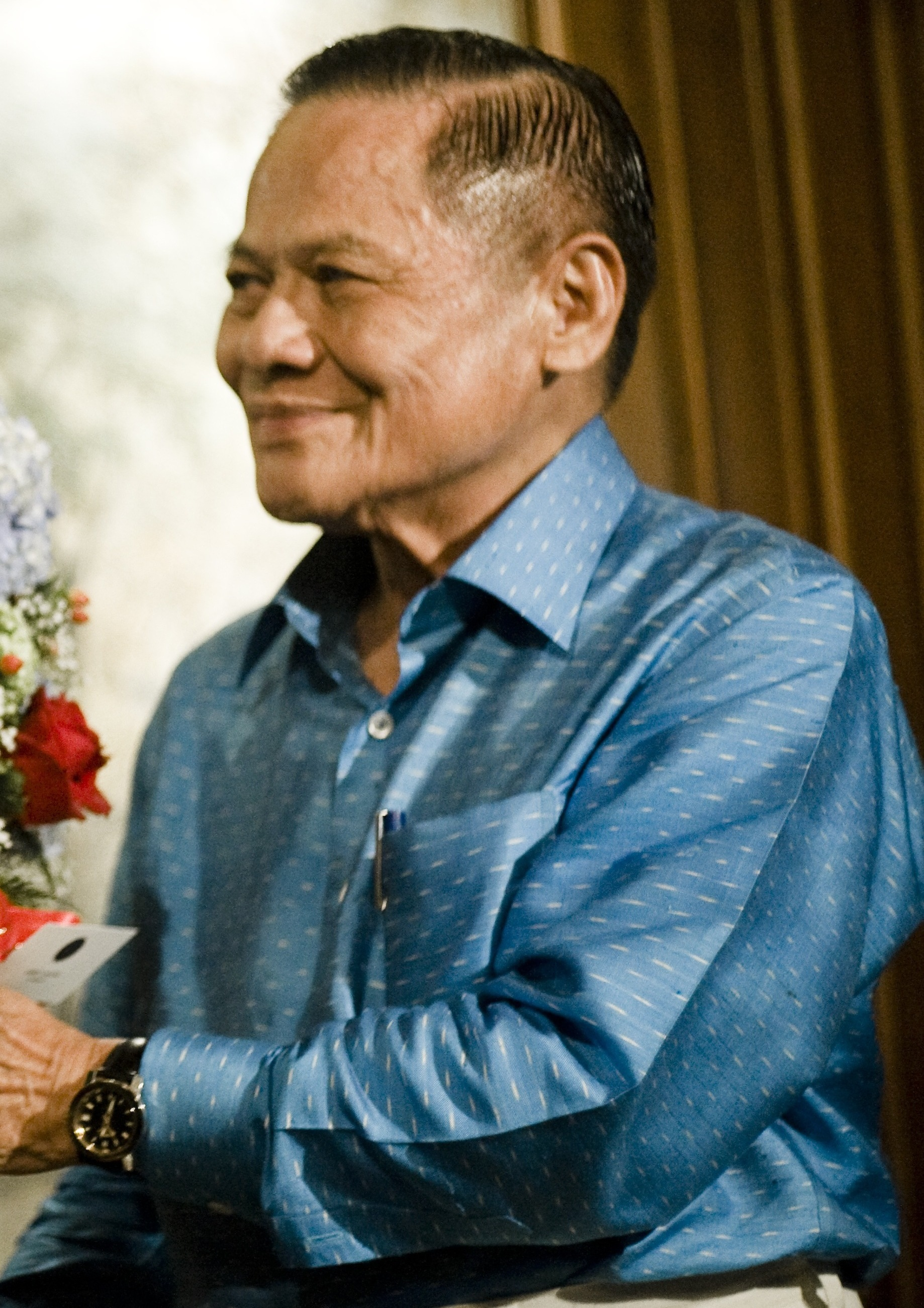

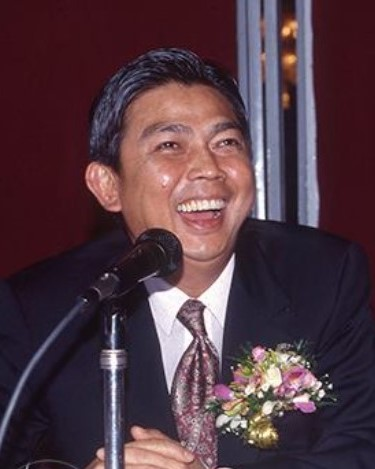
	First party	Second party	Third party
Leader	Chavalit Yongchaiyudh	Chuan Leekpai	Chatichai Choonhavan
Party	New Aspiration	Democrat	National Development
Last election	12.30%, 57 seats	22.28%, 86 seats	11.95%, 53 seats
Seats won	125	123	52
Seat change	▲68	▲37	▼1
Popular vote	16,585,528	18,007,006	7,044,304
Percentage	29.14%	31.78%	12.38%
Swing	▲16.84pp	▲9.50pp	▲0.43pp
	Fourth party	Fifth party
Leader	Banharn Silpa-archa	Montri Pongpanich
Party	Chart Thai	Social Action
Last election	22.83%, 92 seats	3.98%, 22 seats
Seats won	39	20
Seat change	▼53	▼2
Popular vote	5,621,890	3,036,544
Percentage	9.88%	5.33%
Swing	▼12.95pp	▲1.35pp
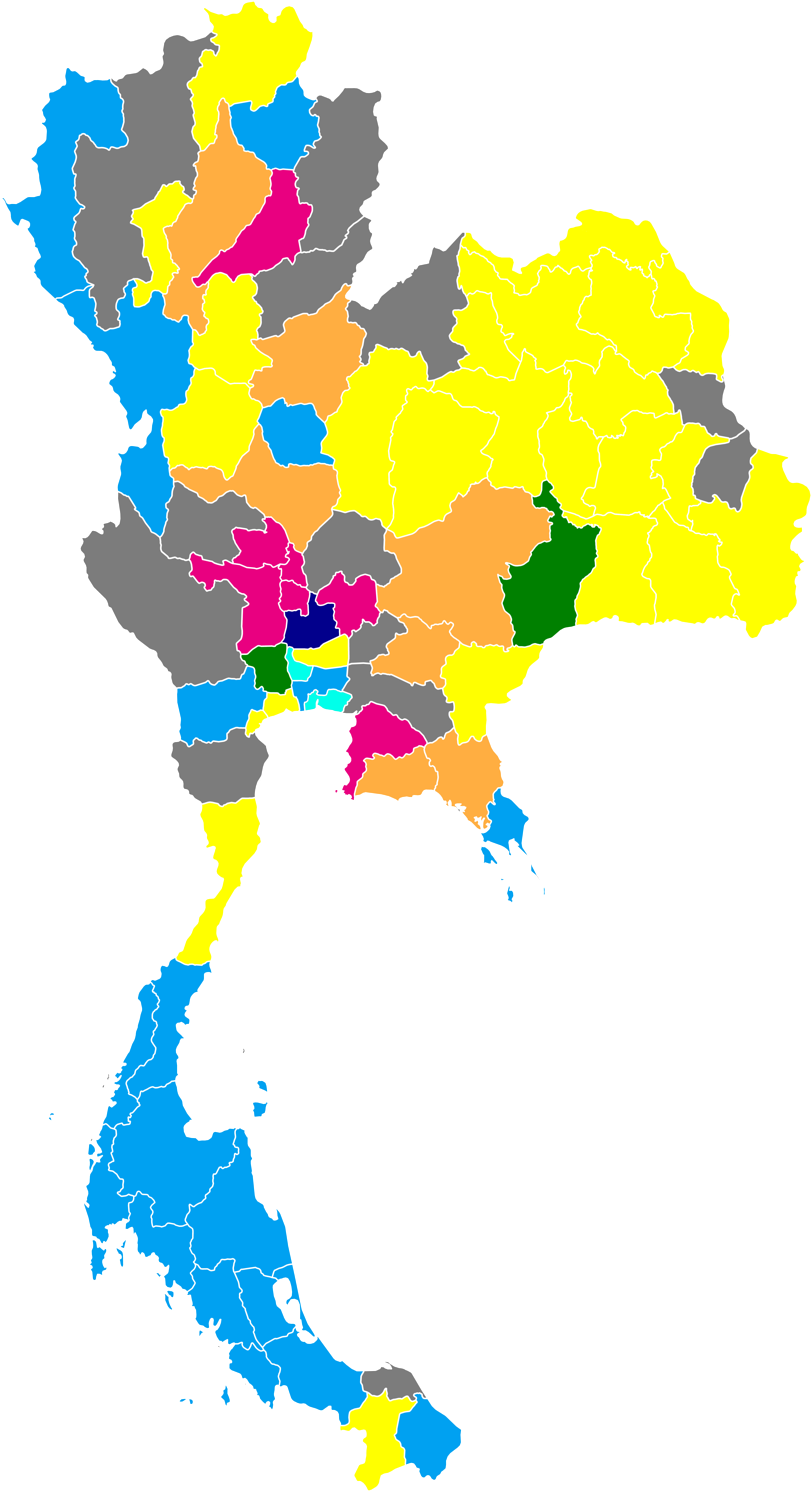
- Majority of seats won by parties by province New Aspiration Democrat National Development Chart Thai; Social Action Solidarity Thai Citizen No majority
Prime Minister before election
Banharn Silpa-archa
Chart Thai
Elected Prime Minister
Chavalit Yongchaiyudh
New Aspiration

Early general elections were held in Thailand on 17 November 1996. The result was a victory for the New Aspiration Party, which won 125 of the 393 seats, despite winning fewer votes than the Democrat Party. Voter turnout was 62.4%.

== Background ==
The previous general elections had been held in July 1995 and resulted in Banharn Silpa-archa of the Thai Nation Party becoming prime minister. However, concerns about Banharn's ability to ensure a strong economy grew after several unpopular cabinet appointments, including the appointment of Surakiart Sathirathai as Finance Minister, a move that met with the disapproval of the business community due to the sharp economic downturn that followed. A growing number of other ministers and deputy ministers were accused of corruption and manipulating the stock exchange for personal profit.

A motion of no confidence was put forward in the House of Representatives in September 1996. Most of the Thai Nation Party's coalition partners deserted the government during the debates. Although they eventually voted for against the motion, they demanded Banharn resign within seven days of the vote. The threats of defection by two coalition partners — the New Aspiration Party (NAP) and the Leading Thai Party — forced Banharn to agree to resign. The terms demanded that he step down and a new cabinet be formed with NAP leader Chavalit Yongchaiyudh as head of government. However, although Banharn agreed to step down, he dissolved the House of Representatives rather than allowing Chavalit to become prime minister.

== Campaign ==
MPs changing parties prior to the elections resulted in the consolidation of the political field into four major parties, and a total of 2,310 candidates from 13 political parties contested the elections.

National issues were more important to urban voters and less important to rural voters. The electorate's biggest concern was the economic slowdown, but the economic platforms of the major parties were not significantly different. Most parties focused on fiscal discipline and reducing the current account deficit.

== Conduct ==
PollWatch called the legitimacy of the election into question and refused to ratify the results. They announced that the elections could not have been clean and fair due to the vast amounts of money used during the election and the abuse of power, intimidation, and violence against voters, as well as open cheating on election day by government officials.

The elections saw a large increase in the amount of money spent on campaigns and an increase in vote-buying. PollWatch estimated that candidates spent around 20 to 30 billion baht on buying votes, and candidates reportedly paid between 100 and 1,500 baht for a single vote, with some even paid 5,000 baht. Vote buying tended to be focused on areas where influence could be purchased relatively cheaply, and most of the vote-buying occurred in the north-east region. Of the 5,294 complaints PollWatch received about malpractice, 2,730 of them were related to vote-buying.

== Results ==
The results showed a close two-way race between the NAP and the Democrat Party. Although the Democrats received the most votes and won 123 seats, the NAP won 125 seats and became the largest party in the House of Representatives. 60% of the MPs were re-elected, and only 22 of the 393 elected members were women. Nearly three-quarters of had bachelor’s degrees or higher, with 58% being under 50 years old.

The results showed a regionalization of support for different parties. The NAP dominated in the north-east, where Chavalit had established a strong base during his period as Army Commander, building ties with the officials and business leaders. The South has long been a Democratic stronghold, with the Democrats having cultivated strong ties with young Muslim voters. Support in Bangkok shifted from the Palang Dharma Party to the Democrats, who gained the support of the city's elite and provincial voters and won 29 of the city's 37 seats.

Party	Votes	%	Seats	+/–
Democrat Party	18,087,006	31.78	123	+37
New Aspiration Party	16,585,528	29.14	125	+68
National Development Party	7,044,304	12.38	52	–1
Thai Nation Party	5,621,890	9.88	39	–53
Social Action Party	3,036,544	5.33	20	–2
Thai Citizen Party	2,330,135	4.09	18	0
Palang Dharma Party	1,550,170	2.72	1	–22
Solidarity Party	1,011,299	1.78	8	0
Seritham Party	708,430	1.24	4	–7
Mass Party	680,204	1.20	2	–1
Thai Party	164,464	0.29	1	New
Liberal Democracy Party	56,804	0.10	0	New
Labour Party	40,798	0.07	0	New
Total	56,917,576	100.00	393	+2
Valid votes	23,438,248	97.37		
Invalid/blank votes	632,502	2.63		
Total votes	24,070,750	100.00		
Registered voters/turnout	38,564,593	62.42		
Source: Nohlen et al.

== Aftermath ==
Chavalit became prime minister, leading a coalition government consisting of the National Development Party, Social Action Party, Thai Citizens' Party, Seritham Party and Mass Party.
