= 2009 in Thai football =

The 2009 season of competitive football in Thailand.

The season began on 7 March 2009 for the Thai Premier League and 21 March 2009 for the Division 1 League. The Division 1 season ended on 17 October 2009, and the Thai Premier League season ended on 18 October 2009.

== Promotion and relegation (pre-season) ==
Teams promoted to Thai Premier League 2009

- Muangthong United
- Sriracha
- Rajnavy Rayong

Teams relegated from Thailand Premier League 2008

- Customs Department Phetchaburi
- Royal Thai Army
- ~~Bangkok Bank~~ (withdraw)

Teams promoted to Thai Division 1 League 2009

- Prachinburi
- Songkhla
- Sisaket

Teams relegated from Thailand Division 1 League 2008

- Phitsanulok
- Raj-Vithi

== Managerial changes ==
Name	Club	Date of departure	Replacement	Date of appointment
Jadet Meelarp	Chonburi	January 2009	Kiatisuk Senamuang	January 2009
Kiatisuk Senamuang	Chula United	January 2009	Carlos Ferreira	January 2009
Prajuk Viengsong	TTM Samut Sakhon	January 2009	Attaphol Puspakom	January 2009
Attaphol Puspakom	TTM Samut Sakhon	April 2009	Kij Meesrisuk	April 2009
Surasak Tansurat	Muangthong United	April 2009	Attaphol Puspakom	April 2009
Prapol Pongpanich	PEA	May 2009	Thongsuk Sampahungsith	May 2009
Hans R. Emser	Bangkok Glass	June 2009	Surachai Jaturapattarapong	June 2009
Pansak Ketwattha	Pattaya United	June 2009	Wisoon Wichaya	June 2009
Christophe Larrouilh	BEC Tero Sasana	June 2009	Tawan Sripan	June 2009
Wisoon Wichaya	Pattaya United	June 2009	Jadet Meelarp	June 2009
Carlos Ferreira	Chula United	August 2009	Pichai Pituwong	August 2009
Kij Meesrisuk	TTM Samut Sakhon	August 2009	Prajuk Viengsong	August 2009
Chatchai Paholpat	Nakhon Pathom	September 2009	Piyapong Pue-on	September 2009

== Diary of the season ==
- 1 March 2009: Chonburi won the Kor Royal Cup beating PEA 1–0 at Suphachalasai Stadium.
- 7 March 2009: The first Thai Premier League matches of the season are played.
- 18 November 2009: Thailand lost to Singapore at home stadium for first time in 34 years, after they lost 0–1 in 2011 AFC Asian Cup qualification.
- 23 October 2009: The Thai FA Cup is won by Thai Port on penalties against BEC Tero Sasana after a 1–1 draw at Suphachalasai Stadium.

== National team ==
=== Friendly matches ===
5 February 2009

Thailand	1–2	Saudi Arabia
Teerasil 89'

Sendai, Japan

28 March 2009
18:00 UTC+7

Thailand	3–1	New Zealand
Teerasil 15', 71'; Tawan 21'

Rajmangala Stadium, Bangkok

8 November 2009
17:00 UTC+7

Thailand	1–1	Syria
Teeratep 60'

Thunderdome Sport Complex, Nonthaburi

29 December 2009
18:30 UTC+7

Thailand	3–0	Zimbabwe
Suttinan 28', 82'; Keerati 85'

Thai-Japanese Stadium, Bangkok

=== King's Cup ===
21 January 2009
19:00 UTC+7

Thailand	2–1	Lebanon
Teerasil 11'; Suchao 22'		El Ali 51'

Surakul Stadium, Phuket
Attendance: 15,000 referee= Prayoon Veerapool (Thailand)

23 January 2009
19:00 UTC+7

Denmark League XI	2–2	Thailand
Olsen 35'; Ilsø 90'		Sutee 66' (pen.), 81'
Penalties
Stokholm (penalty scored); Duncan (penalty scored); Bernburg (penalty scored); Ilsø (penalty scored); Poulsen (penalty scored)	5–3	(penalty scored) Sutee; (penalty missed) Datsakorn; (penalty scored) Anon; (penalty scored) Rangsan

Surakul Stadium, Phuket
Attendance: 15,000
Referee: Sura Sriart (Thailand)

=== Asian Cup qualifiers ===
Thailand is currently in Group E of the 2011 AFC Asian Cup qualification process.

14 January 2009
17:00 UTC+2

Jordan	0–0	Thailand
	Report

Amman International Stadium, Amman
Attendance: 5,000
Referee: Abdulrahman Racho (Syria)

28 January 2009
18:30 UTC+7

Thailand	0–0	Iran
	Report

Rajamangala Stadium, Bangkok
Attendance: 10,000
Referee: Valentin Kovalenko (Uzbekistan)

14 November 2009
19:30 UTC+8

Singapore	1–3	Thailand
Fahrudin 84' (pen.)	Report	Sutee 12' (pen.), 81'; Therdsak 75'

National Stadium, Singapore
Attendance: 22,183
Referee: Hiroyoshi Takayama (Japan)

18 November 2009
18:30 UTC+7

Thailand	0–1	Singapore
	Report	Đurić 38'

Rajamangala Stadium, Bangkok
Attendance: 30,000
Referee: Abdullah Balideh (Qatar)

== Honours ==
Competition	Winner	Details	Match Report
Thai FA Cup	Thai Port	FA Cup 2009; Beat BEC Tero Sasana 5–4 on penalties (1–1 final score)	Report
Queen's Cup	Hallelujah	Queen's Cup 2009; Beat BEC Tero Sasana 1–0	
Thai Premier League	Muangthong United	Thai Premier League 2009	
Division 1 League	Police United	Thai Division 1 League 2009	
Regional League	Raj Pracha-Nonthaburi	Regional League Division 2 2009	
Kor Royal Cup	Chonburi	Kor Royal Cup 2009; Beat PEA 1–0	
Super Cup	Bangkok Glass	Super Cup 2009	
