= Miss Thailand Universe 2005 =

6th Miss Thailand Universe pageant

- Date: 26 March 2005
- Presenters: Sanya Kunakorn
- Venue: Sofitel Centara Grand Bangkok, Bangkok, Thailand
- Broadcaster: BBTV Channel 7
- Entrants: 44
- Placements: 12
- Winner: Chananporn Rosjan; Bangkok

Miss Thailand Universe 2005 was the sixth Miss Thailand Universe pageant, held at Sofitel Centara Grand Bangkok, in Bangkok, Thailand on 26 March 2005. The 44 contestants arrived in Phuket to participate in activities a week earlier, then returned to Bangkok to compete in the final round, which was broadcast live on BBTV Channel 7.

Chananporn Rosjan was crowned Miss Thailand Universe 2005 by Morakot Aimee Kittisara, Miss Thailand Universe 2004. Rosjan subsequently represented Thailand in Miss Universe 2005 pageant in Bangkok, Thailand. She is the first Miss Thailand Universe to win the Best National Costume award.

Runner-up Nusara Suknamai was one of five passengers (including the pilot) traveling in a helicopter belonging to Leicester City Football Club owner Vichai Srivaddhanaprabha, also on board, which crashed on the evening of 27 October 2018, with no survivors.
