= Sukavich Rangsitpol =

Thai business executive and politician

- สุขวิช รังสิตพล

Deputy Prime Minister of Thailand
- In office 25 October 1994 – 11 December 1994
- Prime Minister: Chuan Leekpai
- In office 25 November 1996 – 8 November 1997
- Prime Minister: Chavalit Yongchaiyudh

Minister of Education
- In office 13 July 1995 – 24 November 1996
- Prime Minister: Banharn Silpa-archa
- In office 25 November 1996 – 14 August 1997
- Prime Minister: Chavalit Yongchaiyudh

Personal details
- Born: 5 December 1935 (age 90) Bangkok, Thailand
- Party: New Aspiration (1994–2001); Thai Rak Thai (2001–2006)

Sukavich Rangsitpol (Thai: สุขวิช รังสิตพล RTGS: Sukkhawit Rangsitphon; born 5 December 1935) is a Thai business executive and politician. He served as Deputy Prime Minister (1994, 1996–97) and Minister of Education (1995–97) of Thailand.

== Life and career ==
Sukavich completed a bachelor's degree in political science at Thammasat University in 1960 and the Management Development Program of Asian Institute of Management, Manila in 1976. He started working as a sales representative for Caltex Oil Thailand in 1961, being promoted to sales supervisor, district manager, general sales manager and general manager over the following decades. He finally served as chairman and managing director of that company during the early 1990s.

Sukavich became a Senator in 1987, was appointed to the National Legislative Assembly after the coup d'état in 1991, and returned to the Thai Senate in 1992. Between 1993 and 1994 he was the governor of the Expressway and Rapid Transit Authority of Thailand (ETA).

In 1994, Sukavich joined the New Aspiration Party (NAP) of retired general Chavalit Yongchaiyudh and was appointed deputy prime minister in Chuan Leekpai's cabinet in October of the same year. However, he lost that position after a few weeks. Sukavich was appointed minister of education in Banharn Silpa-archa's cabinet in July 1995. In addition, he was the secretary-general of the NAP from 1995 to 1997.

He was elected to the House of Representatives in 1996, representing Bangkok's 13th constituency. After New Aspiration's electoral victory, Sukavich again was a deputy prime minister in Chavalit Yongchaiyudh's cabinet in addition to his post as Minister of Education. Moreover, he served as Southeast Asian Ministers of Education Organization (SEAMEO) council president in 1996.

Sukavich also lost the deputy premiership in November 1997 when Chavalit was ousted by a no-confidence vote during the Asian financial crisis.

In 2001 Sukavich was re-elected as member of parliament, being number three of the New Aspiration Party list. Together with party leader Chavalit Yongchaiyudh and most of the NAP lawmakers, he switched to the Thai Rak Thai Party (TRT) of prime minister Thaksin Shinawatra later in the same year.

In 2005, he was re-elected once again, this time a representative of the TRT party list. As one of 111 executive members of the TRT, he was banned from political activities for five years after the 2006 coup d'état. He expressed no wish to return to politics after the ban expired.
