= USS LSM-333 =

LSM-1-class landing ship medium

Coordinates: 12.95622°N 100.79329°E

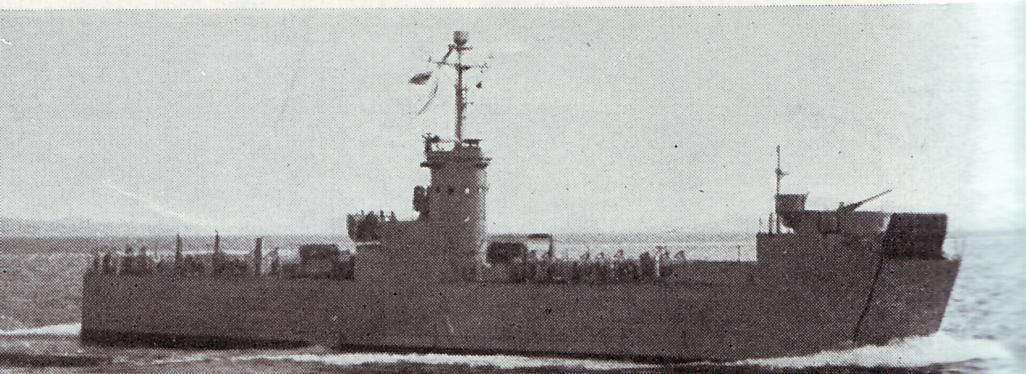
- HTMS Kut

History

United States
- Name: LSM-333
- Builder: Pullman Co., Chicago
- Laid down: 27 June 1944
- Launched: 13 October 1944
- Commissioned: 11 November 1944
- Decommissioned: 28 July 1946
- Stricken: 1946
- Honors and awards: See Awards
- Fate: Transferred to Thailand, October 1946

History

Thailand
- Name: Kut
- Namesake: Kut Island
- Acquired: October 1946
- Commissioned: 20 November 1947
- Decommissioned: 13 January 1989
- Reclassified: LSM-731
- Stricken: 1990
- Identification: Pennant number: LSM-1
- Fate: Sunk as artificial reef, 17 September 2006

General characteristics
- Class & type: LSM-1-class landing ship medium
- Displacement: 520 long tons (528 t) light; 743 long tons (755 t) landing; 1,095 long tons (1,113 t) full load
- Length: 203 ft 6 in (62.03 m) o/a
- Beam: 34 ft 6 in (10.52 m)
- Draft: 3 ft 6 in (1.07 m) forward; 7 ft 8 in (2.34 m) aft; Fully loaded : 6 ft 4 in (1.93 m) forward; 8 ft 3 in (2.51 m) aft
- Propulsion: 2 × Fairbanks-Morse (model 38D81/8X10, reversible with hydraulic clutch) diesels. Direct drive with 1,440 bhp (1,074 kW) each @ 720 rpm, twin screws
- Speed: 13.2 knots (15.2 mph; 24.4 km/h)
- Range: 4,900 nmi (9,100 km) at 12 kn (22 km/h)
- Capacity: 5 medium or 3 heavy tanks, or 6 LVTs, or 9 DUKWs
- Troops: 2 officers, 46 enlisted
- Complement: 5 officers, 54 enlisted
- Armament: 6 × 20 mm AA gun mounts
- Armour: 10-lb. STS splinter shield to gun mounts, pilot house and conning station

USS LSM-333 was a LSM-1-class landing ship medium in the United States Navy during World War II. The ship was transferred to Thailand and renamed HTMS Kut (LSM-1) (Thai: เรือหลวงกูด).

== Construction and career ==
LSM-333 was laid down on 27 June 1944 at Pullman Co., Chicago, Illinois. Launched on 13 October 1944 and commissioned on 11 November 1944.

During World War II, LSM-333 was assigned to the Asiatic-Pacific theater. She took part in the Battle of Okinawa from 28 April to 18 May 1945.

LSM-333 was decommissioned on 28 July 1946 and later transferred to Thailand in October, later that year.

She was struck from the Navy Register in 1946.

The ship was commissioned into the Royal Thai Navy on 20 November 1947 and renamed HTMS Kut (LSM-1). She was later redesignated LSM-731 later in her career.

On 13 January 1989, the ship was decommissioned and stricken in 1990. She sat at the Royal Thai Navy Dock Yard Phachunlachomklao until 17 September 2006, in which she was towed out to Pattaya Bay, to be sunk as the second artificial reef in the area. Since its sinking, it has become a diving site and home to several kinds of fish such as barracuda, rabbitfish, and giant grouper. It sits 30 metres (33 yd) under water.

== Awards ==
LST-333 have earned the following awards:

- American Campaign Medal
- Navy Occupation Service Medal (with Asia clasp)
- World War II Victory Medal
- Asiatic-Pacific Campaign Medal (1 battle star)

== Sources ==
- United States. Dept. of the Treasury (1962). Treasury Decisions Under the Customs, Internal Revenue, Industrial Alcohol, Narcotic and Other Laws, Volume 97. U.S. Government Printing Office.
- Moore, Capt. John (1984). Jane's Fighting Ships 1984-85. Jane's Information Group. ISBN 978-0710607959.
- Saunders, Stephen (2009). Jane's Fighting Ships 2009-2010. Jane's Information Group. ISBN 978-0710628886.
- Fairplay International Shipping Journal Volume 222. United Kingdom: Fairplay Publishing Limited. 1967.
