= Chananporn Rosjan =

Thai model

- Born: Chananporn Rosjan; March 8, 1982 (age 44); Bangkok, Thailand
- Height: 5 ft 7 in (1.70 m)
- Beauty pageant titleholder
- Title: Miss Thailand Universe 2005
- Hair color: Black
- Eye color: Brown
- Major competitions: Miss Thailand Universe 2005 (winner), Miss Universe 2005 (Best National Costume)

Chananporn Rosjan (Thai: ชนันภรณ์ รสจันทน์), nicknamed Nod (Thai: น้อด) is a Thai pilot, model and beauty pageant titleholder who won Miss Thailand Universe 2005.

== Biography ==
Rosjan was educated primarily at Ruamrudee International School in Bangkok, Thailand.

She moved to New York City, United States with her family where her guardian was general consulate. She studied at the Francis Lewis High School and returned to Thailand to study at Sirindhorn International Institute of Technology at Thammasat University where she later received Bachelor of Electrical Engineering.

Besides Thai and English, Rosjan also speaks German and Italian.

== Career ==
She represented Thailand in Junior World Golf Championships held in San Diego, California, between 1992 and 1996.

She now works as a pilot for Thai Air Asia.

== Pageantry ==
On 29 March 2005, Rosjan won the coveted title of Miss Thailand Universe 2005 beating 43 other hopeful young women around the country.

She then went on to compete with 80 other beautiful young women from around the globe in the Miss Universe 2005 pageant held in her home country where she won Best National Costume Award. She was one of the favourites to win the Miss Universe crown but did not place. She was, however, the third Thai woman to win the pageant's Best National Costume Award, the others being Saengduan Manwong in 1969 and Porntip Nakhirunkanok in 1988.

Preceded by Morakot Aimee Kittisara	Miss Thailand Universe; 2005	Succeeded by Charm Onwarin Osathanond
