= Pak Phanang school shooting =

2003 school shooting in Thailand

- Location: 8.356077°N 100.202610°E; Pak Phanang school, Nakhon Si Thammarat, Thailand
- Date: 6 June 2003
- Target: Sicharat Kumsuk
- Attack type: Mass shooting, school shooting
- Weapon: 9mm semi-automatic pistol
- Deaths: 2
- Injuries: 5
- Perpetrator: Anatcha Boonkwan

On 6 June 2003, a mass shooting occurred at the Pak Phanang school in Nakhon Si Thammarat, Thailand. The gunman, then 17-year-old Anatcha Boonkwan (a.k.a. "Nung") fatally shot two of his fellow students, and injured four others, using a semi-automatic pistol. This was apparently due to his argument with classmate Sicharat Kumsuk, who was his actual target.

== Victims ==
The two killed were:

- Kraisorn Kanchanadul, 17
- Wanida Klaewbang, 17

The five injured were:

- Wanida Kaewpan
- Srijaras Khumsuk
- Wuthidej Promthong
- Yodrak Paenthao
- Kanokwan Mokthong

All the injured victims were 17 at the time of the incident.

== Shooting ==
Anatcha Boonkwan, the perpetrator, was a student at the Pak Phanang school. A day prior to the shooting, Boonkwan had a tiff with his classmate, Sicharat Kumsuk. According to Kumsuk, it was a "trading of insults". On 6 June 2003, while students gathered on the school field to listen to a speech, Boonkwan attempted to shoot Kumsuk using a 9mm semi-automatic pistol which he had stolen from his father. His father, realizing that his weapon had been stolen, then rushed to school. He arrived before the younger Boonkwan opened fire. Upon learning of his father's arrival, Anatcha Boonkwan took out the pistol and fired seven shots, but only one hit Kumsuk. The others struck his other classmates. The total death toll was 2, while 4 others were injured. Boonkwan was subsequently arrested by local police.

== Reaction ==
In response to the shooting, then prime minister Thaksin Shinawatra said that the incident was a "deplorable emulation of an example set in western countries". He added that he would "work with the Education Ministry to prevent more school shootings". Friends of Kraisorn Kanchanadul, one of the two who were fatally shot, expressed their desire to "seek revenge" on Boonkwan.

== See also ==
- List of school-related attacks
- Columbine High School massacre
- Walisongo school massacre
