= Pracharaj Party =

Political party in Thailand

Royal People Party พรรคประชาราช
- Leader: Kumpee Suriyasasin
- Secretary-General: Porrapit Kosonjit
- Founder: Sanoh Thienthong
- Founded: January 10, 2006; 20 years ago
- Dissolved: August 14, 2018; 7 years ago
- Headquarters: Nonthaburi, Thailand

Website
- http://www.prp.or.th

The Royal People Party (Thai: พรรคประชาราช, RTGS: Phak Phracharat) was a populist political party in Thailand. The party was established and registered at the Electoral Commission on February 10, 2006, by Sanoh Thienthong, former Thai Rak Thai party chairman.

After the establishment, Sanoh tapped many well known individuals, such as former Deputy Prime Minister Purachai Piemsomboon, Head of the Office of the Attorney General Khunying Jaruvan Maintaka and Secretary General of the Chaipattana Foundation Sumet Tuntivejakul, to be the leader of the party, but all of them turned down the offer. Thus, Sanoh became the leader with Prachai Leophai-ratana elected as Secretary-General and Pramuan Rujanaseri elected as the Deputy Leader.

On September 20, 2007, at the party's annual congress, Sanoh Thienthong was voted unanimously to remain leader, but Prachai Liewpairat became the party's chairman. Anongwan Thepsuthin became the new party's Secretary General.

On October 5, 2007, Prachai set up a press conference and announced his resignation due to policy conflicts. He and the party's Secretary General resigned and became Matchima Party members. Chienchuang Kanlayanamith replaced Anongwan Thepsuthin as the new Secretary General.

On December 2, 2008, the People's Power Party was banned by the Constitutional Court of Thailand due to electoral fraud occurring in the run-up to the 2007 parliamentary election. This action automatically resulted in the dissolution of the governing coalition. Thereafter, the leaders of the party including Uraiwan Thienthong (Sanoh's wife) announced that the party would not join any Democrat-led government coalition.

In 2018, Pracharaj Party was dissolved by order of Election Commission of Thailand.

== 2007 Election ==
The 12 main policies

1. Promotion of sufficiency economy
2. Suppression of corruption and fraud
3. Bring peace back to the South of Thailand
4. Appropriate documentation of land
5. Protection of natural resources
6. Support for poor farmers. Establishment of agricultural cooperatives. Review of Free Trade Agreements
7. Solve debt problems of farmers
8. Free education for students until Grade 12
9. Protection of the rights and interests of organized labor
10. Ensure protection of children's rights, rights of elderly people and rights of people with disabilities
11. Restore public health care
12. Broadening of the tax base

The party has announced that if the party was to win the plurality of votes and thus the right to form the necessary, majority coalition government, the party's deputy leader, Korn Dabbaransi, would become the Prime Minister instead of the traditional policy of the party's leader, Sanoh Thienthong, becoming prime minister.
