= Carlos Ferreira (sailor) =

Portuguese sailor (1931–2017)

Carlos Francisco José de Borja Cabral da Câmara Ribeiro Ferreira (2 May 1931 – 12 January 2017) was a Portuguese sailor who competed in the 1960 Summer Olympics and in the 1964 Summer Olympics. He died on 12 January 2017, at the age of 85.
