= Morakot Sangtaweep =

Thai-British actress

Morakot Aimee Kittisara
- มรกต เอมมี่ กิตติสาระ
- Born: Morakot Aimee Kittisara; 1 February 1984 (age 42); London, England
- Other names: Aimee; Morakot Sangtaweep
- Height: 5 ft 7 in (1.70 m)
- Spouse: Jirayu Sangtaweep (m. 2015)
- Children: 1
- Beauty pageant titleholder
- Title: Miss Thailand Universe 2004
- Agency: Channel 7 (2004–2014)
- Years active: 2004–2022
- Hair color: Black
- Eye color: Brown
- Major competitions: Miss Thailand Universe 2004; (Winner); Miss Universe 2004; (Unplaced)

Morakot Aimee Kittisara (Thai: มรกต เอมมี่ กิตติสาระ; born 1 February 1984) later Morakot Sangtaweep (Thai: มรกต แสงทวีป, RTGS: Morakot Saengthawip) is a Thai-English actress, model, TV host and beauty pageant titleholder who won the Miss Thailand Universe 2004. She was born and raised in London, England. She attended Plashet School and Valentines Sixth Form in London before graduating from Brunel University.

== Pageantry ==
=== Participation ===
On 27 March 2004, Morakot Kittisara was crowned the fifth Miss Thailand Universe in Bangkok, Thailand.

She then went on to represent Thailand at the 53rd Miss Universe pageant, held at the Centro de Convenciones CEMEXPO, Quito, Ecuador, on 1 June 2004, but did not place. The pageant was won by Jennifer Hawkins of Australia.

=== Hosting ===
Morakot co-hosted a national costume competition in the Miss Universe 2005 pageant, held in Thailand. The award was won by Miss Thailand Chananporn Rosjan.

== Filmography ==
=== Television ===
Year	Title	Role	Network	Notes
2004	Longthang Rak	Lerlaksamee	Channel 7	
2005	Sing Motorsai Kab Yaituasab	Khanomphing	Channel 7	
2005	Faa Krajang Dao	Wimanin	Channel 7	
2005	Sueb Sao Rao Rak	Chalida	Channel 7	Cameo
2006	Duay Rang Hang Rak	Piyaphatch	Channel 7	
2006	Lek Lai	Phim	Channel 7	
2007	Girl Cup Rab Huajai Sai Pratoo	Kesorn	Channel 7	
2007	Nongmeow Khiaw Phetch	Phetchnaree	Channel 7	Cameo
2007	Phiang Phuen Fa	Chongkho	Channel 7	
2008	Phoot Maenam Khong	Thor-hook	Channel 7	
2008	Montra Hang Rak	Miki	Channel 7	
2008	Phik Fa La Tawan	Meena	Channel 7	
2009	Saphai Jaided	Srikanda	Channel 7	Cameo
2010	Ngao Huajai	Chidchom	Channel 7	
2010	Khunmor Mor 3	Makongkaew	Channel 7	
2011	Lui	Fangkaew	Channel 7	
2011	Mooban Samranrak	Som	Channel 7	
2012	Krabuebal	Orn-anong	Channel 7	
2012	Ubatihet	Nathalie	Channel 7	Cameo
2013	Aya Ruk	Son	Channel 7	
2013	Fa Jarod Sai	Katchfeeya	Channel 7	
2013	Mor Ruk Mor Pleng	Mor Ruk	Channel 7	Sitcom
2014	Ngao	Chalinee	Channel 7	
2017	Club Friday The Series Season 9: Ruk Tong Laek	Tai	GMM 25	
2019	Pakarang See Dum		Channel 3	

=== Film ===
Year	Title	Role	Notes
2008	Saphai Brue (Scary Daughter In Law)	Nual	

Preceded by Yaowalak Traisurat	Miss Thailand Universe; 2004	Succeeded by Chananporn Rosjan
