= Carlos Ferreira (footballer) =

Luxembourgish footballer

Personal information
- Full name: Joao Carlos Ferreira Capela
- Date of birth: 24 August 1980 (age 46)
- Place of birth: Ettelbruck, Luxembourg
- Position: Midfielder

Youth career
- –2000: Etzella Ettelbruck

Senior career*
Years	Team	Apps	(Gls)
2000–2014	Etzella Ettelbruck	207	(1)
2014–2019	Feulen		(7+)
2019–2020	Sporting Mertzig	4	(0)

International career
2005–2009	Luxembourg	20	(0)
- * Club domestic league appearances and goals

Joao Carlos Ferreira Capela (born 24 August 1980) is a Luxembourgish former footballer who played as a midfielder. He made 20 appearances for the Luxembourg national team between 2005 and 2009.

== Club career ==
Ferreira began his career in the youth ranks of Etzella Ettelbruck. He made his debut for the club in 2000, and won the Luxembourg Cup in his debut season. During the 2011–12 season, he suffered a serious injury in a 6–1 win against Victoria Rosport, which kept him out of action for several months. Following his return from injury, he never played for the first team again, instead primarily playing for the club's reserve team.

In January 2014, Ferreira signed for Feulen. In June 2019, he signed for Sporting Mertzig, where he played four matches in the 2019–2020 season before retiring.

== International career ==
Ferreira was first called up to the Luxembourg national team in 2005 by head coach Guy Hellers. He made his debut on 30 March 2005, in a 4–0 defeat to Latvia, becoming the first footballer of Portuguese descent to represent Luxembourg.

Overall, he made 20 appearances for Luxembourg between 2005 and 2009.

== Personal life ==
During his career, Ferreira gained the nickname "Litti".

== Honours ==
Etzella Ettelbruck

- Luxembourg Cup: 2000–01
- Luxembourg Division of Honour: 2002–03
