= New Aspiration Party =

Thai political party

New Aspiration Party พรรคความหวังใหม่
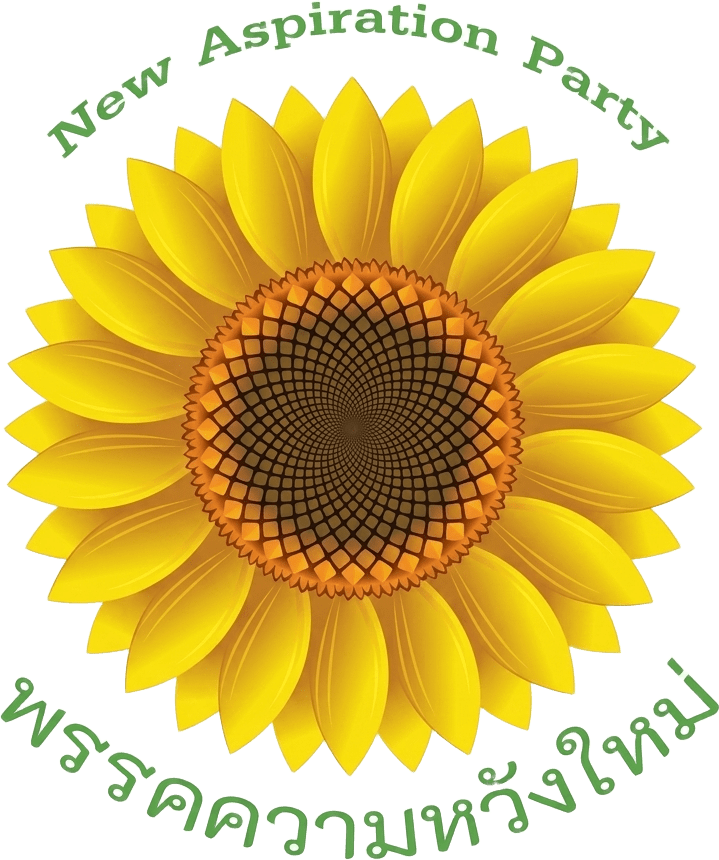
- Leader: Chavalit Yongchaiyudh (1990–2002); Chingchai Mongkoltham (since 2002)
- Secretary-General: Juluek Boonchai
- Founded: 11 October 1990
- Merged into: Thai Rak Thai Party
- Headquarters: Lat Phrao, Bangkok, Thailand
- Ideology: Populism; 1990–1997: Neoliberalism
- Political position: Centre

Website
- www.nap.or.th (Archived 3 March 2000)

The New Aspiration Party (Thai: พรรคความหวังใหม่, romanized: Phak Khwam Wang Mai) is a political party in Thailand. The party was established in 1990 by General Chavalit Yongchaiyudh after his retirement as Commander-In-Chief of the Royal Thai Army. This party won the elections of 1996 and formed a coalition government with Chavalit as Prime Minister. The onset of the Asian Financial Crisis in 1997 diminished the electorate's confidence in the government, and Chavalit was forced to resign.

Discredited as a result of the economic crisis, Chavalit formed a coalition with the populist Thai Rak Thai Party led by Thaksin Shinawatra to take part in the 2001 elections. Shortly after the election, the majority of the New Aspiration Party merged with Thai Rak Thai and Chavalit became the Deputy Prime Minister in Thaksin's cabinet.

After the election in 2001, Thaksin Shinawatra of the Thai Rak Thai Party became prime minister. The New Aspiration Party joined his government. In the following year, the party's majority—including leader Chavalit Yongchaiyudh—merged into the Thai Rak Thai Party. Some members disagreed with this decision: Thita Rangsitpol Manitkul joined the Democrat Party instead, Chalerm Yubamrung revived his Mass Party, and Chingchai Mongkoltham decided to continue the New Aspiration Party.

In the legislative elections on July 3, 2011, the party won 0.08% of the popular vote and no seats in the House of Representatives.

== New Aspiration Party Speaker ==
Name	Portrait	Periods in Office	Election
Wan Muhamad Noor Matha		24 November 1996 – 27 June 2000	1996 (20th)

== New Aspiration Party Prime Ministers ==
Name	Portrait	Start Date	End Date	Election
Chavalit Yongchaiyudh		25 November 1996	9 November 1997	1996 (20th)
