= Chavalit Yongchaiyudh =

Prime Minister of Thailand from 1996 to 1997

Chavalit Yongchaiyudh MPCh MWM TChW RMK PBh LOM PMN CCLH GCM
- ชวลิต ยงใจยุทธ
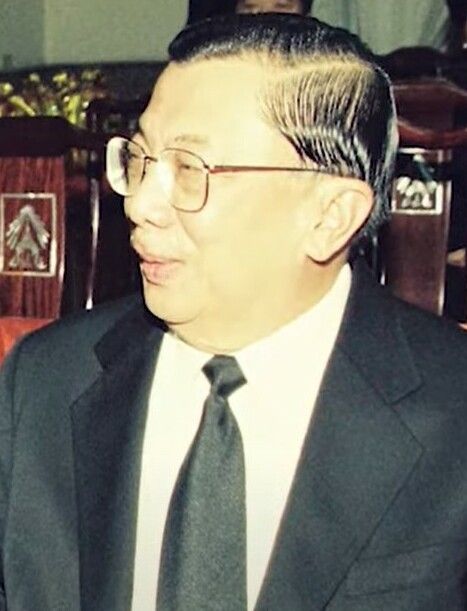

22nd Prime Minister of Thailand
- In office 25 November 1996 – 9 November 1997
- Monarch: Bhumibol Adulyadej
- Deputy: See list: Sukavich Rangsitpol Amnuay Viravan Korn Dabbaransi Montree Pongpanich Samak Sundaravej Thaksin Shinawatra Wiraphong Ramangkun Suwit Khunkitti
- Preceded by: Banharn Silpa-archa
- Succeeded by: Chuan Leekpai

Leader of the Opposition
- In office 26 November 1997 – 30 April 2000
- Prime Minister: Chuan Leekpai
- Preceded by: Chuan Leekpai
- Succeeded by: Chuan Leekpai
- In office 15 May 1992 – 16 June 1992
- Prime Minister: Suchinda Kraprayoon
- Preceded by: Pramarn Adireksarn
- Succeeded by: Pramarn Adireksarn

Deputy Prime Minister of Thailand
- In office 24 September 2008 – 7 October 2008
- Prime Minister: Somchai Wongsawat
- In office 17 February 2001 – 11 March 2005
- Prime Minister: Thaksin Shinawatra
- In office 13 July 1995 – 24 November 1996
- Prime Minister: Banharn Silpa-archa
- In office 14 July 1994 – 25 October 1994
- Prime Minister: Chuan Leekpai
- In office 30 March 1990 – 21 June 1990
- Prime Minister: Chatichai Choonhavan
Ministerial offices
Minister of Defence
In office 17 February 2001 – 3 October 2002
Prime Minister	Thaksin Shinawatra
In office 25 November 1996 – 8 November 1997
Prime Minister	Himself
In office 13 July 1995 – 24 November 1996
Prime Minister	Banharn Silpa-archa
In office 30 March 1990 – 21 June 1990
Prime Minister	Chatichai Choonhavan
Minister of Interior
In office 29 September 1992 – 11 December 1994
Prime Minister	Chuan Leekpai
Preceded by	Pao Sarasin
Succeeded by	Sanan Kachornprasart
Minister of Labour and Social Services
In office 15 September 1993 – 1 January 1994
Prime Minister	Chuan Leekpai
Preceded by	position established
Succeeded by	Paitoon Kaewtong

Member of the House of Representatives
- In office 6 January 2001 – 19 March 2001
- Constituency: Party-list
- In office 22 March 1992 – 28 June 2000
- Constituency: Nonthaburi 1st District (1992–1995); Nakhon Phanom 1st District (1995–2000)

Supreme Commander of the Armed Forces
- In office 1 October 1987 – 31 March 1990
- Preceded by: Supha Gajaseni
- Succeeded by: Sunthorn Kongsompong

Commander-in-chief of the Royal Thai Army
- In office 27 May 1986 – 31 March 1990
- Preceded by: Arthit Kamlang-ek
- Succeeded by: Suchinda Kraprayoon

Personal details
- Born: 15 May 1932 (age 94) Nonthaburi, Siam
- Party: Pheu Thai (2009–2013); People's Power (2007–2008); Thai Rak Thai (2002–2005); New Aspiration (1990–2002; 2011–2015)
- Spouses: Vipha (div.); Prasertsri Chan-aporn (div.); Pankruea Yongchaiyudh (div.); Orathai Sorakan (m. 2018)

Military service
- Allegiance: Thailand
- Branch/service: Royal Thai Army
- Rank: General; Admiral; Air Chief Marshal
- Commands: Commander-in-Chief (1986–1990); Supreme Commander (1987–1990)

Chavalit Yongchaiyudh (Thai: ชวลิต ยงใจยุทธ, RTGS: Chawalit Yongchaiyut, IPA: [t͡ɕʰá.wá.lít joŋ.t͡ɕaj.jút]; born 15 May 1932), also known as "Big Jiew" (บิ๊กจิ๋ว, RTGS: Bik Chio, IPA: [bík t͡ɕǐw]), is a Thai politician and retired army officer, he served as the prime minister of Thailand from 1996 to 1997. From 1986 to 1990, he was the Commander-in-chief of the Royal Thai Army (RTA), and Supreme Commander of the Royal Thai Armed Forces from 1987 to 1990. In 1990, he founded the New Aspiration Party which he led until 2002. At various times he has held the positions of Deputy Prime Minister, Minister of Defence, Minister of the Interior, Minister of Labour and Leader of the Opposition.

== Education and military career ==
Chavalit is of Sino-Thai and Lao descent. His father was an infantry captain. Chavalit attended Triam Udom Suksa School and graduated from Armed Forces Academies Preparatory School Class 1, same class as Surayud Chulanont, and Chulachomklao Royal Military Academy, being appointed second lieutenant in 1953. He served in the RTA Signal Corps and completed advanced training courses at the RTA Signal Corps School, as well as at Fort Monmouth, a US Army Signal Corps School, and with the US IX Corps in Okinawa.

In 1963, he graduated from the RTA Command and General Staff College, and one year later from the United States Army Command and General Staff College at Fort Leavenworth. During the 1960s and 1970s, Chavalit served in the communist insurgency suppression campaign in the jungles of Thailand, and prepared Thai soldiers for their operations in the Vietnam War. During the period after the October 1973 popular uprising, he was considered close to the Thahan Prachathippatai ("Democratic Soldiers") group, even though he did not openly identify as a member of the group.

In 1979, Chavalit was promoted to major-general and Director of Army Operations. Intending to outwit Communist Party of Thailand (CPT) guerillas, he created the pro-government Thahan Phran ("hunter soldiers"), paramilitary units who would use guerilla tactics against the CPT. They took over a significant share of the army's counterinsurgency missions by 1982. However, Chavalit believed that the communists could not be defeated by purely military means, but that combating the political, economic and social causes of the insurgency was also necessary to destroy their popular support. He helped to author cabinet orders 66/2523 (1980) and 65/2525 (1982) of Prem Tinsulanonda's government, which offered amnesty and a return to civil life to surrendering communist fighters. The orders contributed significantly to the demise of the CPT and the end of the insurgency.

In 1982, Chavalit was promoted to lieutenant-general and assistant chief-of-staff, and one year later deputy chief-of-staff of the army. Chavalit's rise to the army's top posts was unusual for a signal corps officer, as its leading positions were traditionally reserved for infantrymen, artillerymen, and "cavalrymen" (i.e., tankers). He owed his exceptional career partly to his close relationship to Prime Minister Prem, being one of his core supporters in the army, but also to his military, strategic, and political acumen.

In 1986, he was appointed commander-in-chief of the RTA, and one year later the supreme commander of the armed forces. Under his leadership, the army began projects for rural development. These included the Isan Khiao ("Green Isan") programme in the underdeveloped northeastern region, and the Khwam Wang Mai ("New Hope") programme in the conflict-ridden southern provinces. These projects were based on the ideas of the former "Democratic Soldiers" and cabinet order no. 66/2523: that economic development and relief of regional disparities involved national security, and were therefore tasks for the army. For these projects Chavalit provided large corporations with lucrative contracts, including the leading Thai agribusiness corporation Charoen Pokphand. Chavalit retired from military service in 1990, at the age of 58.

== Political career ==
Chavalit began his political activity while still serving in the military. From 1984 to 1987, during the "Semi-Democratic" phase, he was an appointed member of the Senate. In 1987, he publicly proposed to have a prime minister directly elected by the people; he was accused of attempting to undermine the monarchy's role, temporarily discrediting his public image. In 1990 he was appointed Defence Minister and Deputy Prime Minister in the administration of Chatichai Choonhavan. During the early 1990s, Chavalit controlled 126 military-run radio stations and two of the country's five television networks. Chavalit agreed to make military stations available for an anti-AIDS campaign. He also agreed to help Meechai Viravaidya spearhead a three-year blitz to halt the spread of the disease.

In 1990, he launched his own party, the New Aspiration Party. His plan was to make it a dominant ruling party, modelled on the Golkar party of Indonesia's President Suharto. The party was backed by the Charoen Pokphand group and its chairman Dhanin Chearavanont. Chavalit used contacts from his time as army commander and head of the "Green Isan" programme to recruit former soldiers, civil servants, and local officials in the Northeast as members of his party.

In March 1992, Chavalit was elected a member of the House of Representatives for a constituency in Nonthaburi Province. Being the leader of the largest non-government coalition party, he was sworn in as Leader of the Opposition. He then served as Minister of the Interior in the cabinet of Chuan Leekpai from 1992 to 1994, and was Deputy Prime Minister and Minister of Defence in the government of Banharn Silpa-archa from 1995 to 1996.

== Premiership (1996–1997) ==
Following the Royal Decree of Parliament Closure a general election was held on 17 November 1996. Chavalit's New Aspiration Party won the most seats. With the support of five coalition parties — National Development, Social Action, Thai Citizens', Liberal Integrity and Mass Party — Chavalit was appointed by royal decree as the 22nd Prime Minister of Thailand on 25 November 1996. However, during his premiership he encountered pressure from many political movements, who forced him to resign on 6 November 1997, in the midst of the Asian financial crisis.

On 14 May and 15 May 1997, the Thai baht, which was then pegged to the US dollar, was hit by massive speculative attacks. Chavalit announced he would not devalue the baht, but in July 1997 the government had no choice but to devalue the currency. This sparked the Asian financial crisis, due to the Thai government's failure to defend the baht against international speculators.

At the time, Thailand had acquired a burden of foreign debt that made the country effectively bankrupt even before the collapse of its currency.

Thailand's booming economy ground to a halt amidst massive layoffs in finance, real estate, and construction, resulting in huge numbers of workers returning to their villages in the countryside and 600,000 foreign workers being sent back to their home countries. The baht devalued swiftly and lost more than half of its value, and the Thai stock market dropped 75% in 1997. Due to this crisis, Chavalit stepped down in November 1997.

According to some observers, King Bhumibol Adulyadej distrusted Chavalit as he saw him as a threat to his so-called "network monarchy", an informal alliance of politicians and officials favoured by the palace.

== Later life ==
Chavalit then once again became Leader of the Opposition in the House of Representatives. The New Aspiration Party quickly lost popularity, as well as the support of the Charoen Pokphand Group, which began supporting Thaksin Shinawatra and his new Thai Rak Thai Party (TRT). After New Aspiration's electoral defeat in 2001, Chavalit abandoned it and switched over to the TRT, taking most party members and lawmakers with him. Subsequently, Chavalit served as Deputy Prime Minister responsible for internal security under Thaksin's premiership from 2001 to 2005 and as Minister of Defence from 2001 to 2002.

After holding the position of deputy prime minister in Somchai Wongsawat's cabinet, on 7 October 2008, he resigned, admitting partial responsibility for violence because of police use of tear gas at a Parliament blockade, injuring 116 protesters. His resignation letter stated: "Since this action did not achieve what I planned, I want to show my responsibility for this operation."

On 2 October 2009, Chavalit joined the Pheu Thai Party, which was composed of loyalists to Thaksin Shinawatra. He insisted that he would be a regular member until the party's executives considered a future role for him. Currently, he is active as a president for a South Thailand insurgency scheme, "Komuniti Pulang Kampong."

Chavalit Yongchaiyudh is the Honorary president of The International Academy of Social Sciences.(Albany, USA)

On 16 May 2022, Yongchaiyudh announced he was planning to form a new political party called Siam Civilized Party, although he will not be the leader of such a party.

On 6 October 2025, Yongchaiyudh was reported to have been in declining health. He was revealed to be bedridden and unable to speak, having also undergone a tracheotomy.

As of May 2026, He is residing in his home in Bangkok.

== Honours ==
=== Royal decorations ===
- Knight Grand Commander (Second Class, higher grade) of the Most Illustrious Order of Chula Chom Klao
- Knight Grand Cordon (Special Class) of the Most Exalted Order of the White Elephant
- Knight Grand Cordon (Special Class) of The Most Noble Order of the Crown of Thailand
- Knight Grand Cross (First Class) of the Most Admirable Order of the Direkgunabhorn
- Knight Commander (Second Class) of the Honourable Order of Rama
- Member of the Order of Symbolic Propitiousness Ramkeerati
- King Rama IX Royal Cypher Medal, 4th Class
- The Victory Medal - Vietnam War
- The Freeman Safeguarding Medal (First Class)
- The Border Service Medal
- Chakra Mala Medal

=== Military ranks ===
- General, Admiral and Air Chief Marshal

=== Volunteer Defense Corps of Thailand rank ===
- Volunteer Defense Corps General

=== Foreign honours ===
- South Vietnam :
  - Gallantry Cross with palm
  - Staff Service Medal, First Class
  - Vietnam Campaign Medal
- United States :
  - Commander of the Legion of Merit (1988)
  - Bronze Star Medal with "V" device
- Malaysia :
  - Honorary Commander of the Order of the Defender of the Realm (P.M.N.) (1988)
  - Knight Grand Commander of the Order of Military Service (P.G.A.T.)
- Indonesia :
  - Army Meritorious Service Star, 1st Class (1987)
- Singapore :
  - Darjah Utama Bakti Cemerlang (Tentera) (1988)
- Belgium :
  - Grand Cordon of the Order of Leopold (1988)
- Philippine :
  - Chief Commander of the Legion of Honor (1997)
- Argentina :
  - Grand Cross of the Order of the Liberator General San Martín(1997)
- Federal Republic of Germany :
  - Grand Cross 1st Class of the Order of Merit of the Federal Republic of Germany
- Cambodia :
  - Grand Cross of the Royal Order of Monisaraphon (2023)

==== Unit Citation ====
- Meritorious Unit Commendation

== See also ==
- New Aspiration Party

Political offices
Preceded by Banharn Silpa-archa	Prime Minister of Thailand; 1996-1997	Succeeded by Chuan Leekpai
