= Vajirañāṇasaṃvara =

Supreme Patriarch of Thailand from 1989 to 2013

Somdet Phra Sangharaja Chao Krommaluang Vajirañāṇasaṃvara
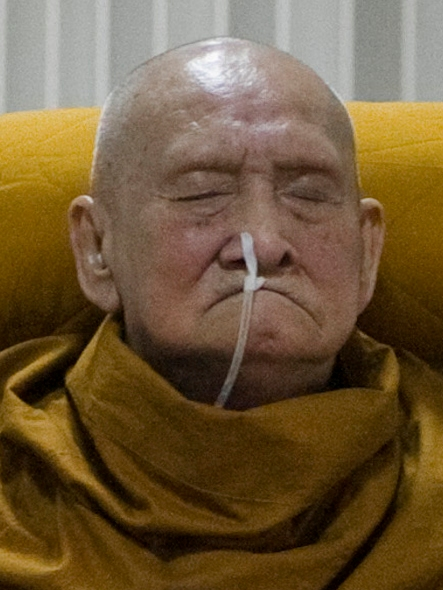
- Krommaluang Vajirañāṇasaṃvara in 2010

19th Supreme Patriarch of Thailand
- In office 21 April 1989 – 24 October 2013
- Preceded by: Jinavaralongkorn
- Succeeded by: Ariyavongsagatanana (Amborn Ambaro)

Personal life
- Born: Charoen Khotchawat; 3 October 1913 Kanchanaburi, Thailand
- Died: 24 October 2013 (aged 100) King Chulalongkorn Memorial Hospital, Bangkok, Thailand
- Other names: Charoen Suvaḍḍhano; Somdet Phra Yannasangwon; Nyanasamvara Suvaddhana

Religious life
- Religion: Buddhism
- Temple: Wat Bowonniwet Vihara
- Order: Dhammayuttika Nikaya
- School: Theravada
- Dharma names: Suvaḍḍhano

Somdet Phra Sangharaja Chao Krommaluang Vajirañāṇasaṃvara^{[a]} (Thai: สมเด็จพระสังฆราชเจ้า กรมหลวงวชิรญาณสังวร; RTGS: Somdet Phra Sangkharat Chao Kromma Luang Wachirayannasangwon; 3 October 1913 – 24 October 2013), né Charoen Khachawat (Thai: เจริญ คชวัตร) and dharma name Suvaḍḍhano (Thai: สุวฑฺฒโน), was the 19th Supreme Patriarch of Thailand. He was appointed to the position in 1989 by King Bhumibol Adulyadej. He turned 100 in October 2013, and died later that month.

== Early life ==
Somdet Phra Nyanasamvara, the 19th monk since the reign of Rama I to hold the title of Supreme Buddhist Patriarch (Sangharaja) of Thailand, was born Charoen Khachawat on 3 October 1913 in Kanchanaburi Province. As a child, he was interested in religion and monastic life; it is said that, as a child, he liked dressing up like a monk, and giving 'sermons' to his friends and family. He completed the equivalent of the 5th grade at a temple school near his home, and was then ordained as a Buddhist novice (samanera) at the age of 14.

Charoen Khachawat traveled to a temple at Nakhon Pathom, 70 km away, where he spent two years studying Pali and Buddhist philosophy. He then moved to Wat Bovoranives in Bangkok, an important temple in the emergent Dhammayutt Order (Thai: Thammayuttika) reform movement, where he completed his basic studies and completed the highest level of Pali studies then available. In 1933, he returned to his old temple in Kanchanaburi to be ordained as a full-fledged monk (bhikkhu).

After passing the better part of a year there, he again traveled to Wat Bovoranives, where he was re-ordained into the Dhammayutt Order, under the supervision of the 13th Thai Supreme Patriarch. During this period in Thailand, it was not uncommon for monks to seek re-ordination under the Dhammayutt Order if their initial ordination had been through a Mahanikaya lineage; the Dhammayutt Order was considered by many to be more careful in its observance of disciplinary rules, and enjoyed great support from the Thai monarchy.

== Rise through the ranks ==
Following his full ordination, Somdet Nyanasamvara rose quickly through the ranks of the Thai Sangha. As Thai ecclesiastic titles often take the form of additions or alterations to monastic names, this necessitated a variety of changes of name and title during the next several years. In 1956, at the age of 43 and under the titular name Phra Dhammavarabhorn, he was appointed guardian and advisor to King Rama IX (Bhumibol Adulyadej) during his royal ordination (by tradition, all Thai monarchs serve as Buddhist monks prior to gaining the throne). Five years later, Somdet Nyanasamvara was named abbot of Wat Bovoranives.

In 1972, he was given the title Somdet Phra Nyanasamvara, the same basic title that he bears today. This was a special monastic title that had not been granted to a Thai bhikkhu in over 150 years. The granting of this title placed Somdet Phra Nyanasamvara in the top tier of the Thai monastic establishment, and set the stage for his being named Supreme Buddhist Patriarch of Thailand (Sangharaja, or "Lord of the Sangha") in 1989 by the king of Thailand.

== Later life ==
By the late 1990s, the Patriarch's health was in serious decline. In early 1999, he stopped attending meetings of the Sangha Council. His attendant and advisors and the other members of the council increasingly managed the day-to-day workings of the Thai Sangha without direct leadership from Somdet Nyanasamvara. By 2003, it was clear that the 90-year-old Sangharaja was unable to effectively fill the position to which he had been appointed. The government appointed a committee of senior monks (selected by monastic rank, not age) to act on behalf of the Sangharaja. The move received widespread support; a poll conducted among Thai monks found that more than 70% supported the appointment of a representative for the Supreme Patriarch. Given the challenges facing the Thai Sangha, the appointment of the representative council seemed like an excellent move. As the committee had the power to act on behalf of the patriarch, they had the opportunity to take up issues that may have been neglected during the absence of the Sangha Council's senior-most member. However, the appointment of a committee to represent the Supreme Patriarch was not without some controversy. Monks close to Somdet Nyanasamvara's camp protested the move as a violation of Thailand's Sangha Act. Government officials countered that these individuals, fearing a loss of prestige or influence if the aging Patriarch was circumvented, were putting their own interests ahead of those of the Sangha.

The Supreme Patriarch allowed materials from his temple, such as ash from incense and powder from bricks, to be made into controversial Jatukham Rammathep amulets. The popularity of the amulets, which are believed by some to have magical powers and cost up to 600,000 baht each, was such that in April 2007, a woman was crushed to death when thousands of people rushed into a school in Nakhon Si Thammarat to buy coupons they could exchange for the amulets. A few weeks after the death, the Supreme Patriarch stopped providing materials for the amulets.

In early 2004, Nyanasamvara was admitted to Chulalongkorn Hospital in Bangkok. He continued to reside at the hospital since then, making only 2 public appearances outside the hospital- the latest in October 2005 to bestow blessings at a ceremony marking his 92nd birthday. By 2005, concerns about the role that the representative council would take were increasingly eclipsed by debate over succession. With the Patriarch's health continuing to decline, focus increasingly turned to Somdet Kiaw (known formally as Somdet Phutthacharn), abbot of Wat Saket. By the terms of Thailand's religious law – modified in 1991 to take the choice of the patriarch away from the king – Somdet Kiaw would become the next Sangharaja automatically. This development was vocally opposed by Phra Maha Bua, a popular monk often believed to be an enlightened arhat.

Phra Maha Bua's supporters claimed that Somdet Kiaw earned his high position in the Sangha hierarchy through corruption and abuse of power, and that he deserved to be defrocked rather than promoted. The controversy gained national prominence when Sondhi Limthongkul and his People's Alliance for Democracy used it to criticize the Thaksin Shinawatra government.

The rancorous succession debate has brought to the forefront long-standing complaints against the amended 1962 Sangha Act (sometimes called the Ecclesiastic Bill) that defines the structure and governance of the Thai Sangha. Created during a period of military dictatorship, the Sangha Act stripped out democratic reforms that accompanied King Mongkut's doctrinal and disciplinary reforms. The act lent greater power to the roll of the Sangharaja, and structured the Sangha along according to a strict hierarchy that stifled dissent and provided few significant roles for younger monks. Thus, while Somdet Nyanasamvara's health has prevented him from taking an active role in reforming the Thai Sangha during the past several years, his death may prompt the biggest reform of all: the creation of a new Sangha Act that will define a more democratic leadership structure for Thailand's largest religious organization.

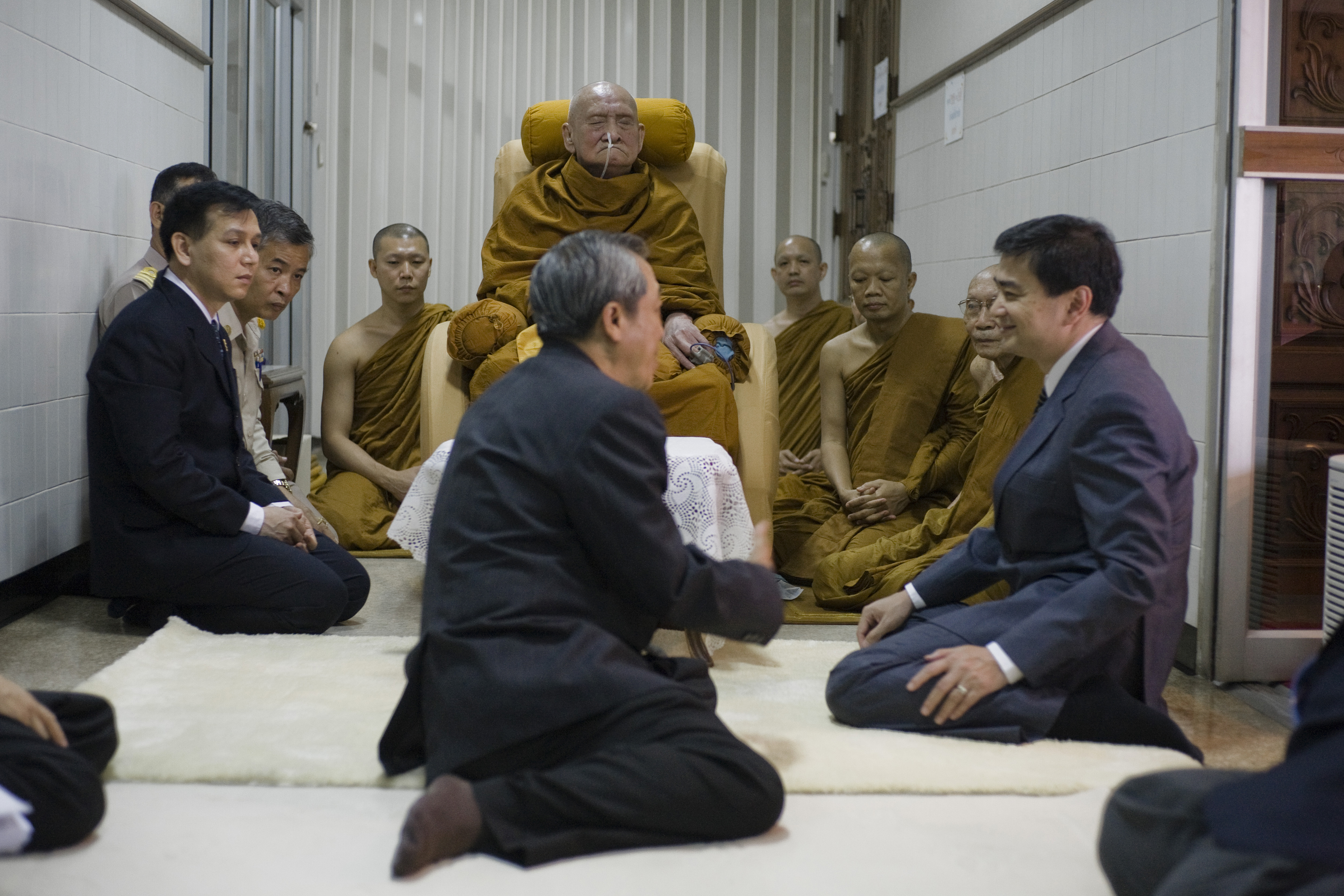
Abhisit Vejjajiva visits Somdet Phra Nyanasamvara at Chulalongkorn Hospital in 2010.

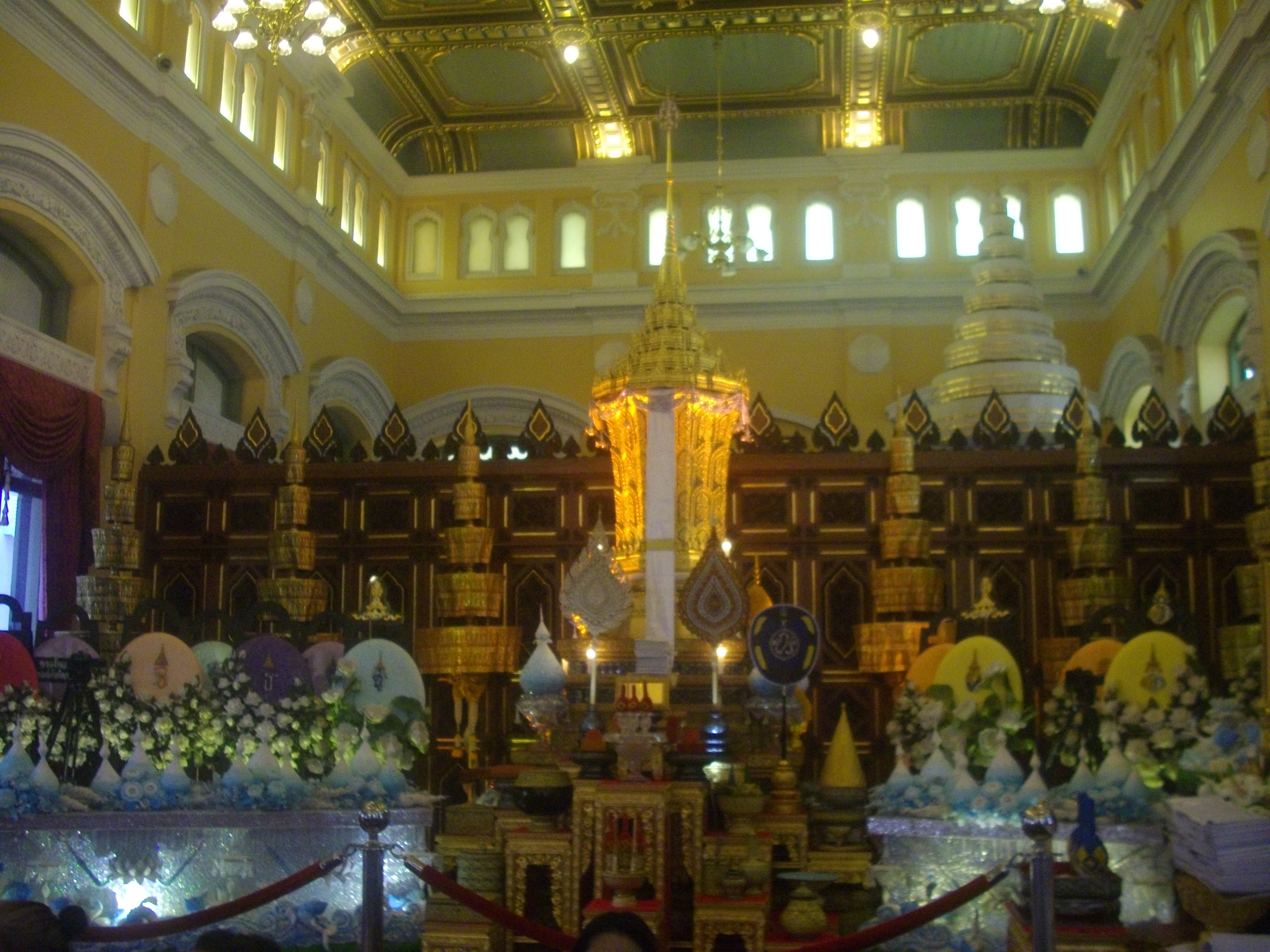
Funerary urn for Somdet Phra Nyanasamvara in 2015.

Styles of Somdet Phra Sangharaja Chao Krommaluang Vajirañāṇasaṃvara
- Reference style: His Holiness
- Spoken style: Your Holiness
- Alternative style: Sir

== See also ==
- Sangharaja
- Supreme Patriarch of Thailand

Buddhist titles
Preceded by Jinavajiralongkorn	Supreme Patriarch of Thailand; 1989–2013	Succeeded by Ariyavongsagatanana (Amborn Ambaro)
