= Yingluck cabinet =

Government cabinet of Thailand

Yingluck Cabinet
- 60th Council of Ministers of Thailand
- 2011–2014
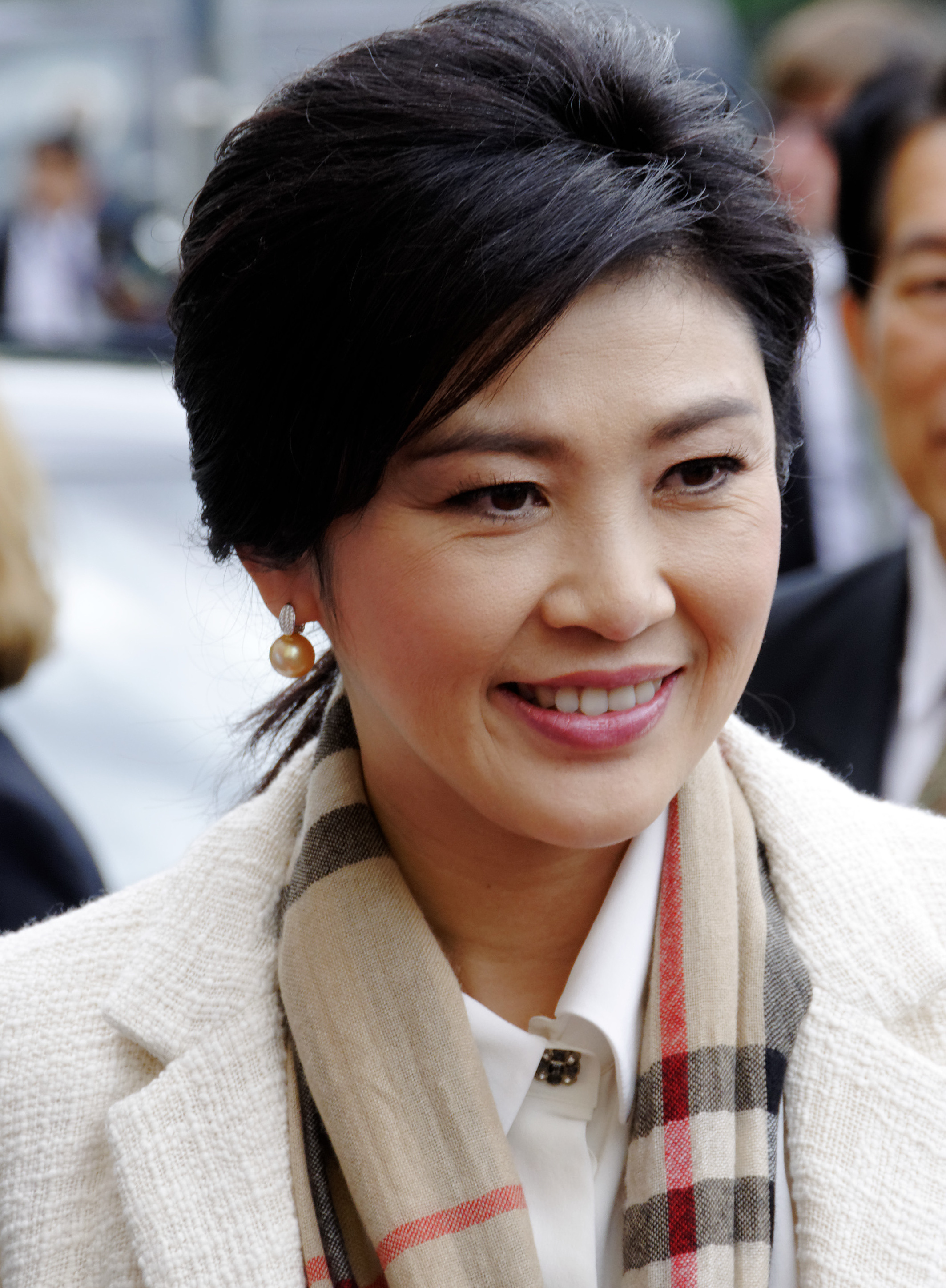
- Date formed: 9 August 2011
- Date dissolved: 22 May 2014

People and organisations
- Monarch: Bhumibol Adulyadej
- Prime Minister: Yingluck Shinawatra (until 7 May 2014); Niwatthamrong Boonsongpaisan (acting)
- Prime Minister's history: 2011–2014
- Deputy Prime Ministers: First appointment (9 August 2011): Yongyuth Wichaidit (until 30 September 2012); Chalerm Yubamrung (until 30 June 2013); Kowit Wattana (until 18 January 2012); Kittiratt Na-Ranong (until 7 May 2014); Chumpol Silpa-archa (died 21 January 2013); Second appointment (18 January 2012): Yuthasak Sasiprapha (until 28 October 2012); Third appointment (28 October 2012): Surapong Tovichakchaikul (until 7 May 2014); Plodprasop Suraswadi (until 7 May 2014); Phongthep Thepkanjana; Fourth appointment (2 April 2013): Yukol Limlaemthong; Fifth appointment (30 June 2013): Niwatthamrong Boonsongpaisan; Pracha Promnok (until 7 May 2014)
- No. of ministers: 24
- Total no. of members: 72
- Member party: Pheu Thai Party; Chartthaipattana Party; Chart Pattana Party; Phalang Chon Party; Mahachon Party; New Democracy Party
- Status in legislature: Coalition government
- Opposition cabinet: Second Abhisit cabinet (De facto)
- Opposition party: Democrat Party; Bhumjaithai Party; Rak Thailand Party; Matubhum Party; Rak Santi Party
- Opposition leader: Abhisit Vejjajiva

History
- Election: 2011 general election
- Legislature term: HoR 24th: 2011–2013
- Budgets: 2012 budget; 2013 budget; 2014 budget
- Predecessor: Abhisit cabinet
- Successor: First Prayut cabinet

The Yingluck Cabinet describes the cabinet selections of Thailand's Prime Minister Yingluck Shinawatra, who served as prime minister from 2011 to 2014. Shinawatra was appointed effective 5 August 2011, and she handed in her cabinet list for endorsement on 9 August 2011. Yingluck and her cabinet were sworn in at Siriraj Hospital where King Bhumibol Adulyadej resided, on 10 August 2011.

She would go on to reorganize the cabinet multiple times. Occasionally either the members of the cabinet or the occasion of the swearing was notable in some way.

== Election of the prime minister ==
5 August 2011; Nomination of Yingluck Shinawatra (PTP) as Prime Minister; Absolute majority: 251/500
Vote	Parties	Votes
Yes	Pheu Thai Party (261), Chartthaipattana Party (19), Chart Pattana Party (7), Phalang Chon Party (7), Mahachon Party (1), New Democracy Party (1)	296 / 500
No	Democrat Party (3)	3 / 500
Abstain	Democrat Party (152), Bhumjaithai Party (34), Rak Thailand Party (4), Matubhum Party (2), Rak Santi Party (1)	197 / 500
Not voting	Democrat Party (4)	4 / 500

== Cabinet Yingluck I ==
Composition of the Council of Ministers before 18 January 2012:

Party key	Pheu Thai Party
Party key	Chartthaipattana Party
Party key	Chart Pattana Puea Pandin Party
Party key	Phalang Chon Party
Party key	Independent

Cabinet of Thailand
Portfolio	Minister	Deputy Minister
Prime Minister	Yingluck Shinawatra	
Deputy Prime Minister	Yongyuth Wichaidit	
Deputy Prime Minister	Pol. Capt Chalerm Yubamrung	
Deputy Prime Minister	Pol. Gen Kowit Wattana	
Deputy Prime Minister	Kittiratt Na-Ranong	
Deputy Prime Minister	Chumpol Silpa-archa	
The Office of the Prime Minister	Surawit Khonsomboon	
	Kritsana Sihalak	
Ministry of Interior	Yongyuth Wichaidit	Chuchat Hansawat
		Thanit Thienthong
Ministry of Justice	Pol. Gen Pracha Promnok	
Ministry of Defence	Gen Yuthasak Sasiprapha	
Ministry of Finance	Thirachai Phuvanatnaranubala	Boonsong Teriyapirom
		Wirun Techapaiboon
Ministry of Foreign Affairs	Surapong Towijakchaikul	
Ministry of Social Development and Human Security	Santi Prompat	
Ministry of Agriculture and Cooperatives	Theera Wongsamut	Pornsak Charoenprasert
Ministry of Transport	ACM Sukampol Suwannathat	Pol. Lt Gen Chat Kuldilok
		Kittisak Hatthasongkhro
Ministry of Natural Resource and Environment	Preecha Rengsomboonsuk	
Ministry of Information and Communication Technology	Grp Cpt Anudith Nakornthap	
Ministry of Energy	Pichai Naripthaphan	
Ministry of Commerce	Kittiratt Na-Ranong	Phum Saraphol
		Siriwat Kachornprasart
Ministry of Labour	Padermchai Sasomsap	
Ministry of Culture	Sukumol Kunplome	
Ministry of Science and Technology	Dr. Plodprasop Suraswadi	
Ministry of Education	Worawat Ua-apinyakul	Boonruen Srithares
		Suraphong Ueng-amphonwilai
Ministry of Public Health	Witthaya Buranasiri	Torpong Chaiyasarn
Ministry of Industry	Wannarat Channukul	
Ministry of Tourism and Sports	Chumpol Silpa-archa	

== Cabinet Yingluck II ==
On 18 January 2012, Yingluck reshuffled her cabinet, assigning six cabinet members to new posts, naming ten new ministers and deputies and dismissing nine members of the government. The regrouping was assessed as a step to increase loyalty to the head of government and a reaction to discontent with the government's management of the flood disaster. Especially noted was the choice of Nalinee Taveesin (Minister in the PM's Office), who is on a U.S. blacklist for alleged business links to Zimbabwean President Robert Mugabe, and Nattawut Saikua (Deputy Minister of Agriculture), the first leader of the United Front for Democracy Against Dictatorship (UDD, or "Red Shirts") in the government. Yingluck's first cabinet had not incorporated any "Red Shirts" activists.

Composition after the reshuffle on 18 January 2012:

Party key	Pheu Thai Party
Party key	Chartthaipattana Party
Party key	Chart Pattana Puea Pandin Party
Party key	Phalang Chon Party
Party key	Independent

Cabinet of Thailand
Portfolio	Minister	Deputy Minister
Prime Minister	Yingluck Shinawatra	
Deputy Prime Minister	Yongyuth Wichaidit (resigned 30 September 2012)	
Deputy Prime Minister	Pol. Capt Chalerm Yubamrung	
Deputy Prime Minister	Gen Yuthasak Sasiprapha	
Deputy Prime Minister	Kittiratt Na-Ranong	
Deputy Prime Minister	Chumpol Silpa-archa	
The Office of the Prime Minister	Woravat Au-apinyakul	
	Nalinee Taweesin	
	Niwatthamrong Boonsongpaisan	
Ministry of Interior	Yongyuth Wichaidit	Chuchat Hansawat
		Thanit Thienthong
Ministry of Justice	Pol. Gen Pracha Promnok	
Ministry of Defence	ACM Sukampol Suwannathat	
Ministry of Finance	Kittiratt Na-Ranong	Tanusak Lek-uthai
		Wirun Techapaiboon
Ministry of Foreign Affairs	Surapong Towijakchaikul	
Ministry of Social Development and Human Security	Santi Prompat	
Ministry of Agriculture and Cooperatives	Theera Wongsamut	Nattawut Saikua
Ministry of Transport	Charupong Ruangsuwan	Pol. Lt Gen Chat Kuldilok
		Chadchart Sittipunt
Ministry of Natural Resource and Environment	Preecha Rengsomboonsuk	
Ministry of Information and Communication Technology	Grp Cpt Anudith Nakornthap	
Ministry of Energy	Arak Chonlathanont	
Ministry of Commerce	Boonsong Teriyapirom	Phum Saraphol
		Siriwat Kachornprasart
Ministry of Labour	Padermchai Sasomsap	
Ministry of Culture	Sukumol Kunplome	
Ministry of Science and Technology	Dr. Plodprasop Suraswadi	
Ministry of Education	Suchart Thadathamrongvej	Sakda Khongphet
Ministry of Public Health	Witthaya Buranasiri	Surawit Khonsomboon
Ministry of Industry	MR Pongsavas Svasti	
Ministry of Tourism and Sports	Chumpol Silpa-archa	

== Cabinet Yingluck III ==
The cabinet was again reshuffled on 27 October 2012. The new Ministers were sworn in by King Bhumibol Adulyadej at Siriraj Hospital where he resided. It was reportedly the first time that the King did not address the Council of Ministers in swearing in them.

Party key	Pheu Thai Party
Party key	Chartthaipattana Party
Party key	Chart Pattana Puea Pandin Party
Party key	Phalang Chon Party
Party key	Independent

Cabinet of Thailand
Portfolio	Minister	Deputy Minister
Prime Minister	Yingluck Shinawatra	
Deputy Prime Minister	Pol. Capt Chalerm Yubamrung	
Deputy Prime Minister	Kittiratt Na-Ranong	
Deputy Prime Minister	Chumpol Silpa-archa	
Deputy Prime Minister	Surapong Towijakchaikul	
Deputy Prime Minister	Dr. Plodprasop Suraswadi	
Deputy Prime Minister	Phongthep Thepkanjana	
The Office of the Prime Minister	Niwatthamrong Boonsongpaisan	
	Warathep Rattanakorn	
	Sansanee Nakpong	
Ministry of Interior	Jarupong Ruangsuwan	Pol. Lt Gen Chatt Kuldilok
		Thanit Thienthong
		Pracha Prasopdee
Ministry of Justice	Pol. Gen Pracha Promnok	
Ministry of Defence	ACM Sukampol Suwannathat	
Ministry of Finance	Kittiratt Na-Ranong	Tanusak Lek-uthai
Ministry of Foreign Affairs	Surapong Towijakchaikul	
Ministry of Social Development and Human Security	Santi Prompat	
Ministry of Agriculture and Cooperatives	Yukol Limlaemthong	Siriwat Kachornprasart
		Yutthapong Jarassathien
Ministry of Transport	Chadchart Sittipunt	Gen Prin Suwannathat
		Prasert Chantararuangthong
Ministry of Natural Resource and Environment	Preecha Rengsomboonsuk	
Ministry of Information and Communication Technology	Grp Cpt Anudith Nakornthap	
Ministry of Energy	Pongsak Raktapongpaisarn	
Ministry of Commerce	Boonsong Teriyapirom	Nattawut Saikua
Ministry of Labour	Padermchai Sasomsap	
Ministry of Culture	Sontaya Kunplome	
Ministry of Science and Technology	Woravat Au-apinyakul	
Ministry of Education	Phongthep Thepkanjana	Sermsak Pongpanich
Ministry of Public Health	Pradit Sinthwanarong	Chonlanan Srikaew
Ministry of Industry	Prasert Boonchaisuk	Thanis Thienthong
Ministry of Tourism and Sports	Chumpol Silpa-archa	

== Cabinet Yingluck IV ==
After another reshuffle, Yingluck's fifth cabinet was announced on 30 June 2013.

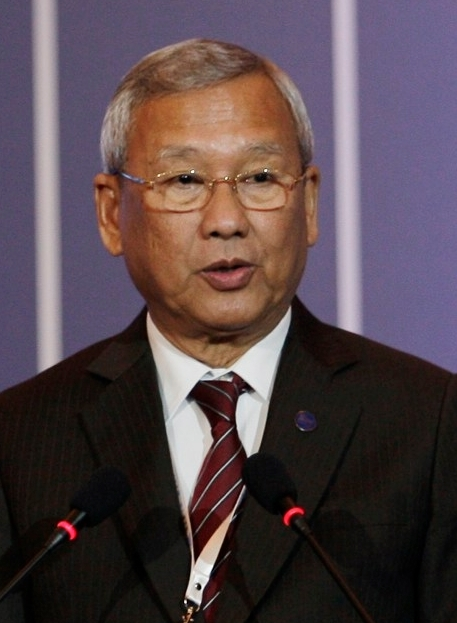
Niwatthamrong, acting prime minister during 8–22 May 2014

Party key	Pheu Thai Party
Party key	Chartthaipattana Party
Party key	Chart Pattana Puea Pandin Party
Party key	Phalang Chon Party
Party key	Independent

Cabinet of Thailand
Portfolio	Minister	Deputy Minister
Prime Minister	Yingluck Shinawatra	
Deputy Prime Minister	Kittiratt Na-Ranong	
Deputy Prime Minister	Surapong Tovichakchaikul	
Deputy Prime Minister	Dr. Plodprasop Suraswadi	
Deputy Prime Minister	Phongthep Thepkanjana	
Deputy Prime Minister	Niwatthamrong Boonsongpaisan	
Deputy Prime Minister	Pol Gen Pracha Promnok	
The Office of the Prime Minister	Warathep Rattanakorn	
	Santi Prompat	
Ministry of Interior	Jarupong Ruangsuwan	Pracha Prasopdee
		Visarn Techateerawat
Ministry of Justice	Chaikasem Nitisiri	
Ministry of Defence	Yingluck Shinawatra	General Yuthasak Sasiprapha
Ministry of Finance	Kittiratt Na-Ranong	Tanusak Lek-uthai
		Benja Louicharoen
Ministry of Foreign Affairs	Surapong Towijakchaikul	
Ministry of Social Development and Human Security	Pavena Hongsakul	
Ministry of Agriculture and Cooperatives	Yukol Limlaemthong	Siriwat Kachornprasart
		Varathep Ratanakorn
Ministry of Transport	Chadchart Sittipunt	Gen Prin Suwannathat
		Pong Chewananth
Ministry of Natural Resource and Environment	Vichet Kasemthongsri	
Ministry of Information and Communication Technology	Grp Cpt Anudith Nakornthap	
Ministry of Energy	Pongsak Raktapongpaisarn	
Ministry of Commerce	Niwatthamrong Boonsongpaisan	Nattawut Saikua
		Yanyong Phuangrach
Ministry of Labour	Pol Capt Dr. Chalerm Yubamrung	
Ministry of Culture	Sontaya Kunplome	
Ministry of Science and Technology	Peerapan Palusuk	
Ministry of Education	Chaturon Chaisang	Sermsak Pongpanich
Ministry of Public Health	Pradit Sinthwanarong	Sorawong Thienthong
Ministry of Industry	Prasert Boonchaisuk	
Ministry of Tourism and Sports	Somsak Phurisisak	
