= 2011 Thai House of Representatives =

24th House of Representatives
←	23rd	25th	→
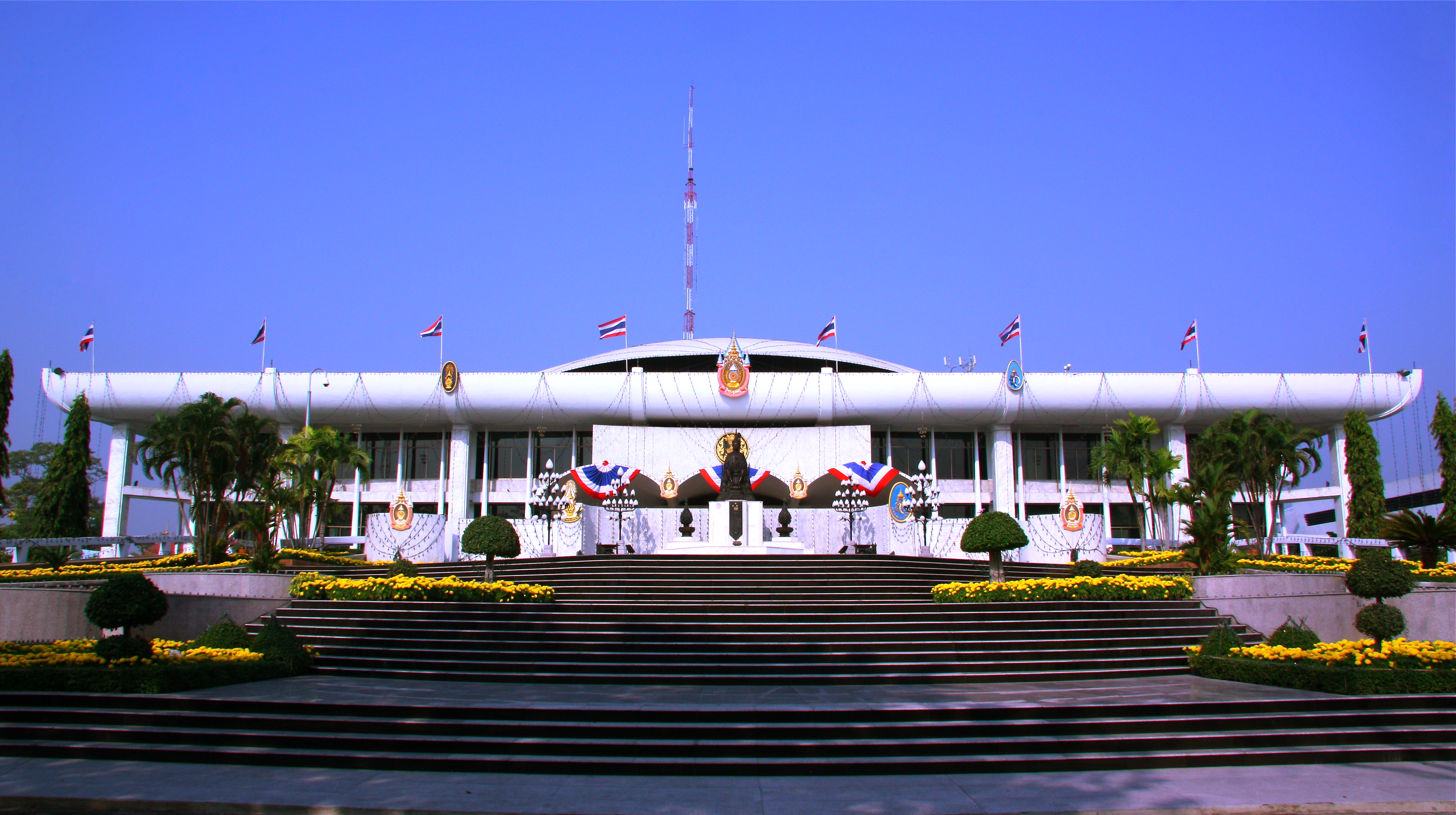
- Old Parliament House, Bangkok

Overview
- Legislative body: National Assembly of Thailand
- Jurisdiction: Thailand
- Meeting place: Parliament House of Thailand
- Term: 3 July 2011 – 9 December 2013
- Election: 2011 Thai general election
- Government: Yingluck cabinet
- Opposition: Democrat Party and 4 opposition parties

House of Representatives
- Members: 500
- Speaker: Somsak Kiatsuranont
- First Deputy Speaker: Charoen Chankomol
- Second Deputy Speaker: Wisut Chainarun
- Prime Minister: Yingluck Shinawatra
- Leader of the Opposition: Abhisit Vejjajiva
- Party control: Pheu Thai Party

Sessions
- 1st: 1 August 2011 – 29 November 2011
- 2nd: 21 December 2011 – 19 June 2012
- 3rd: 1 August 2012 – 29 November 2012
- 4th: 21 December 2012 – 20 April 2013
- 5th: 1 August 2013 – 29 November 2013

Special sessions
- 1st: 29 May 2013 – 19 June 2013
- 2nd: 2 May 2014 – 10 May 2014

This is a list of members of Parliament (MPs) elected for the 24th House of Representatives at 2011 general election.

The list is arranged by electoral district. New MPs elected since the general election and changes in party allegiance are noted at the bottom of the page.

== Graphical representation of the House of Representatives ==
This is a comparison of the party strengths in the House of Representatives of Thailand:

↓
264	19	23	33	161
Pheu Thai	C	O	B	Democrat

== List of MPs elected in the general election ==
The following table is a list of MPs elected, ordered by constituency. As the constituency boundaries have changed, the "notional incumbent" column lists the party estimated to have won the seat at the 2007 election had that election been conducted under the new boundaries, rather than the member that actually held the seat.

Table of contents:

A B C D E F G H I J K L M N O P Q R S T U V W X Y Z Party-list Changes

=== A ===
Constituency	Notional incumbent	Member returned	Notes
Amnat Charoen 1st district	Bhumjaithai	Somying Buabutr (PT)	Incumbent MP Vichian Udomsak (BJT) defeated; first-time MP
Amnat Charoen 2nd district	Democrat	Apiwat Ngenmune (DEM)	Seat held
Ang Thong 1st district	Chartthaipattana	Paradorn Prisananuntagul (CTP)	Seat held
Ang Thong 2nd district	Chartthaipattana	Koravee Prisananuntagul (CTP)	Incumbent MP Pakin Prisananuntagul stood down; seat held; first-time MP
=== B ===
Constituency	Notional incumbent	Member returned	Notes
Bangkok 1st district (Phra Nakhon, Pom Prap Sattru Phai and Samphanthawong)	Democrat	Jermmas Juenglertsiri (DEM)	Seat previously for Dusit, Phra Nakhon, Pom Prap Sattru Phai, Samphanthawong, Bang Rak, Pathum Wan and Ratchathewi; Seat held
Bangkok 2nd district (Pathum Wan, Bang Rak and Sathon)	Democrat	On-anong Kanjanachusak (DEM)	Seat previously for Sathon, Bang Kho Laem, Yan Nawa, Khlong Toei and Watthana; Seat held
Bangkok 3rd district (Bang Kho Laem and Yan Nawa)	Democrat	Mom Luang Apimongkol Sonakul (DEM)	Seat previously for Din Daeng, Huai Khwang, Wang Thonglang and Lat Phrao; Incumbent MP Korn Chatikavanij stood down to run at party-list proportional representation; seat held; previously MP for Bangkok 1st district
Bangkok 4th district (Khlong Toei and Watthana)	Democrat	Anucha Burapachaisri (DEM)	Seat previously for Bang Sue, Lak Si, Chatuchak and Phaya Thai; Seat held
Bangkok 5th district (Dusit and Ratchathewi)	Democrat	Leelawadee Watchalobol (PT)	Incumbent MP Mom Luang Apimongkol Sonakul (DEM) stood down to run at Bangkok 3rd district; first-time MP
Bangkok 6th district	Democrat	Thana Cheeravinij (DEM)	Seat held
Bangkok 7th district (Huai Khwang, Khwaeng Wang Thonglang and Khwaeng Phlapphla)	Democrat	Putthipong Poonnagunt (DEM)	Seat previously for Bang Kapi, Saphan Sung, Min Buri and Lat Krabang; Incumbent MP Pirapan Salirathavibhaga stood down to run at party-list proportional representation; seat held
Bangkok 8th district	Democrat	Sansern Samalapa (DEM)	Seat held
Bangkok 9th district	Democrat	Attavit Suwanpakdee (DEM)	Seat held
Bangkok 10th district (Bang Sue)	Democrat	Cheunchob Kong-udom (DEM)	Seat previously for Rat Burana, Thung Khru, Bang Khun Thian and Bang Bon; Incumbent MP Boonyod Suktinthai stood down to run at party-list proportional representation; seat held; first-time MP
Bangkok 11th district (Lak Si and Khwaeng Sanam Bin)	Democrat	Surachart Thienthong (PT)	Seat previously for Phasi Charoen, Bang Khae and Nong Khaem; Incumbent MP Sakoltee Pattiyakul (DEM) defeated; first-time MP
Bangkok 12th district	Pheu Thai	Karun Hosakul (PT)	Seat held
Bangkok 13th district	Pheu Thai	Group Captain Anudith Nakornthap (PT)	Seat held
Bangkok 14th district	Pheu Thai	Anusorn Puntong (PT)	Seat held
Bangkok 15th district (Bang Kapi)	Pheu Thai	Nut Bantadtan (DEM)	Incumbent MP Danupon Poonnagunt (PT) stood down to run at party-list proportional representation; first-time MP
Bangkok 16th district	Democrat	Pollapoom Viptpoompratet (PT)	Incumbent MP Panich Vikitsreth (DEM) defeated; first-time MP
Bangkok 17th district	Pheu Thai	Vicharn Minchainant (PT)	Seat held
Bangkok 18th district	Democrat	Jirayu Huangsup (PT)	Incumbent MP Samai Jaroenchang (DEM) defeated; first-time MP
Bangkok 19th district	Pheu Thai	Pairoj Issaraseripong (PT)	Seat held
Bangkok 20th district (Lat Krabang)	Pheu Thai	Theerarat Sumrejvanich (PT)	Incumbent MP Danupon Poonnagunt stood down to run at party-list proportional representation; seat held; first-time MP
Bangkok 21st district	Democrat	Narttaya Benjasiriwan (DEM)	Seat held
Bangkok 22nd district	Democrat	Samart Malulim (DEM)	Seat held
Bangkok 23rd district	Democrat	Sutthi Panyasakulwong (DEM)	Seat held
Bangkok 24th district	Democrat	Surun Janpitak (DEM)	Seat held
Bangkok 25th district	Democrat	Nuntapon Weerakulsoonthorn (DEM)	Seat held
Bangkok 26th district	Democrat	Natthapol Theepsuwan (DEM)	Seat held
Bangkok 27th district	Democrat	Sagol Muangsiri (DEM)	Seat held
Bangkok 28th district (Bang Bon and Khwaeng Nong Khaem)	Democrat	Police Colonel Samart Muangsiri (DEM)	Incumbent MP Tawil Praisont stood down; seat held; first-time MP
Bangkok 29th district (Thawi Watthana and Khwaeng Nong Khang Phlu)	Democrat	Ekkanat Promphan (DEM)	Incumbent MP Watchara Pechtong stood down to run at party-list proportional representation; seat held; first-time MP
Bangkok 30th district	Democrat	On-anong Klainok (DEM)	Seat held
Bangkok 31st district	Democrat	Vilas Janpitak (DEM)	Seat held
Bangkok 32nd district	Democrat	Chanin Roongsang (DEM)	Seat held
Bangkok 33rd district	Democrat	Rachada Dhanadirek (DEM)	Seat held
Bueng Kan 1st district	Pheu Thai	Choedpong Rajpongkhan (PT)	New constituency; seat held; previously MP for Nong Khai 2nd district
Bueng Kan 2nd district	Pheu Thai	Trairong Titham (PT)	New constituency; seat held; previously MP for Nong Khai 2nd district
Buriram 1st district (Mueang Buriram except Tambon Sawai Chik, Tambon Mueang Fang, Tambon Song Hong and Tambon Sakae Phrong)	Bhumjaithai	Sanong Thep-aksornnarong (BJT)	Seat previously for Nang Rong, Chamni, Nong Hong, Nong Ki, Pakham, Pakham, Non Suwan, Chaloem Phra Kiat, Lahan Sai and Non Din Daeng; Seat held
Buriram 2nd district (Satuek, Tambon Mueang Pho, Tambon Ta Sao, Tambon Khok Lek, Khaen Dong except Tambon Sa Bua, Ban Dan except Tambon Ban Dan)	Bhumjaithai	Rungsikorn Thimataruka (BJT)	Seat previously for Prakhon Chai, Satuek, Krasang, Ban Kruat, and Phlapphla Chai; Seat held
Buriram 3rd district (Phutthaisong, Na Pho, Ban Mai Chaiyaphot, Tambon Ban Dan, Tambon Sa Bua and Khu Mueang except Tambon Khu Mueang and Tambon Phon Samran)	Bhumjaithai	Sopon Zarum (BJT)	Seat previously for Mueang Buriram, Ban Dan, Huai Rat and Khaen Dong; Seat held
Buriram 4th district (Lam Plai Mat, Tambon Khu Mueang, Tambon Phon Samran, Tambon Thai Samakkhi, Tambon Mueang Fai and Tambon Cho Phaka)	Bhumjaithai	Areeyapon Zarum (BJT)	Seat previously for Lam Plai Mat, Na Pho, Ban Mai Chaiyaphot, Phutthaisong and Khu Mueang; Incumbent MP Peerapong Hengsawas stood down; seat held; first-time MP
Buriram 5th district	Bhumjaithai	Montchai Chartwattanasiri (BJT)	Seat held
Buriram 6th district (Nang Rong, Tambon Charoen Suk, Tambon Sakae Phrong, Tambon Song Hong, Tambon Mueang Fang and Chamni except Tambon Cho Phaka)	Bhumjaithai	Pornchai Srisuriyanyothin (PT)	Incumbent MP Manoch Hengyodmak (BJT) stood down
Buriram 7th district (Nong Ki, Pakham, Non Suwan, Nong Hong except Tambon Thai Samakkhi and Tambon Mueang Fai)	Bhumjaithai	Nudaeng Wankangsai (PT)	Incumbent MP Nuttawut Sukkasem (BJT) stood down; first-time MP
Buriram 8th district (Ban Kruat, Non Din Daeng and Lahan Sai)	Bhumjaithai	Rungroj Tongsri (BJT)	Former Bhumjaithai MP, who was running as Chart Pattana Puea Pandin, Somnuek Hengwanit defeated; seat held
Buriram 9th district	Pracharaj	Jakkrit Tongsri (BJT)	Seat held; previously elected as Pracharaj
=== C ===
Constituency	Notional incumbent	Member returned	Notes
Chachoengsao 1st district	Pheu Thai	Boonlert Pairin (DEM)	Incumbent MP Thitima Chaisang (PT) defeated; first-time MP
Chachoengsao 2nd district	Bhumjaithai	Somchai Assavachaisopon (PT)	Former Puea Pandin MP, who was running as Bhumjaithai, Nutchapol Tanjaroen defeated
Chachoengsao 3rd district	Bhumjaithai	Ros Malipol (PT)	Former Puea Pandin MP, who was running as Bhumjaithai, Pichet Tanjaroen defeated; first-time MP
Chachoengsao 4th district	Pheu Thai	Police Lieutenant General Pitak Jarusombat (DEM)	Incumbent MP Wuttipong Chaisang (PT) defeated; first-time MP
Chainat 1st district	Bhumjaithai	Pontiva Nakasai (BJT)	Seat held
Chainat 2nd district	Pheu Thai	Nuntana Songpracha (BJT)	Incumbent MP Chaiwat Subruangtong (PT) defeated
Chaiyaphum 1st district	Pheu Thai	Ochit Kiatkongchuchai (BJT)	Incumbent MP Prasit Chaiwirattana (PT) defeated; first-time MP
Chaiyaphum 2nd district	Pheu Thai	Mana Lohavanit (PT)	Seat held
Chaiyaphum 3rd district	Pheu Thai	Parichart Charleekleua (PT)	Seat held
Chaiyaphum 4th district	Pheu Thai	Anant Limpakuptatavorn (PT)	Incumbent MP Soontree Chaiwirattana stood down to run at party-list proportional representation; seat held; first-time MP
Chaiyaphum 5th district	Pheu Thai	Jareon Jankomol (PT)	Seat held
Chaiyaphum 6th district	Chartthaipattana	Ponpen Boonsiriwattanakul (PT)	Incumbent MP Chawengsak Rengpaiboonwong (CTP) defeated; first-time MP
Chaiyaphum 7th district	Pheu Thai	Surawit Khonsomboon (PT)	Seat held
Chanthaburi 1st district	Democrat	Tawatchai Anampong (DEM)	Seat held
Chanthaburi 2nd district	Democrat	Yukol Chanawatpanya (DEM)	Seat held
Chanthaburi 3rd district	Democrat	Pongvej Vejjajiva (DEM)	Seat held
Chiang Mai 1st district	Pheu Thai	Tassanee Buranapakorn (PT)	Incumbent MP Surapong Tovichakchaikul stood down to run at party-list proportional representation; seat held; first-time MP
Chiang Mai 2nd district	Pheu Thai	Krissadapon Siampakdee (PT)	Seat held
Chiang Mai 3rd district	Pheu Thai	Chinnicha Wongsawat (PT)	Seat held
Chiang Mai 4th district	Pheu Thai	Wittaya Songkum (PT)	Seat held
Chiang Mai 5th district	Chartthaipattana	Prasit Wuttinunchai (PT)	Incumbent former Ruam Chart Pattana MP, who was running as Chartthaipattana, Krai Darbtham defeated; seat held
Chiang Mai 6th district	Pheu Thai	Julapun Amornvivat (PT)	Seat held
Chiang Mai 7th district	Pheu Thai	Boonsong Teriyapirom (PT)	Seat held
Chiang Mai 8th district	Pheu Thai	Noppakhun Rathpatai (PT)	Seat held
Chiang Mai 9th district	Pheu Thai	Surapol Kiatchaiyakorn (PT)	Seat held
Chiang Mai 10th district	Democrat	Srires Kodkumlue (PT)	Former Puea Pandin MP, who was running as Democrat, Norrapol Tuntimontri defeated; first-time MP
Chiang Rai 1st district	Pheu Thai	Samart Kaewmechai (PT)	Seat held
Chiang Rai 2nd district	Pheu Thai	Surasit Jiemvijuck (PT)	Seat held
Chiang Rai 3rd district	Pheu Thai	Visaradee Techateerawat (PT)	Seat held
Chiang Rai 4th district	Pheu Thai	Rungsun Wanchaithanawong (PT)	Seat held
Chiang Rai 5th district	Pheu Thai	Pichet Chuamuangpan (PT)	Seat held
Chiang Rai 6th district	Pheu Thai	Ittidate Kaewluang (PT)	Seat held
Chiang Rai 7th district	Pheu Thai	La-ong Tiyapairach (PT)	Seat held
Chonburi 1st district	Democrat	Suchart Chomklin (PC)	Incumbent MP Police Major General Veera Anuntagool (DEM) defeated; first-time MP
Chonburi 2nd district	Pheu Thai	Ukrit Tansawat (PC)	Former Democrat MP, who was running as Pheu Thai, Manit Pawasut and incumbent MP Bunjob Roongroj (DEM) defeated; first-time MP
Chonburi 3rd district	Democrat	Ronnatep Anuwat (PC)	Incumbent MP Pramual Aimpia (DEM) defeated; first-time MP
Chonburi 4th district	Democrat	Soravuth Nuangjumnong (DEM)	Seat held
Chonburi 5th district	Democrat	Punsak Gedwatta (PC)	Incumbent MP Thanaroj Rojjanakulset (DEM) defeated; first-time MP
Chonburi 6th district	Democrat	Sukumol Kunplome (PC)	First-time MP
Chonburi 7th district	Democrat	Poramet Ngampichet (PC)	Incumbent MP Pojjanart Kaepaluk (DEM) defeated; first-time MP
Chonburi 8th district	Democrat	Admiral Surapol Jundang (PT)	Incumbent MP Maitri Soyluang (DEM) defeated; first-time MP
Chumphon 1st district	Democrat	Chumphon Junsai (DEM)	Seat held
Chumphon 2nd district	Democrat	Sarawut Onlamai (DEM)	Seat held
Chumphon 3rd district	Democrat	Theerachard Pangviroonrug (DEM)	Seat held
=== K ===
Constituency	Notional incumbent	Member returned	Notes
Kalasin 1st district	Pheu Thai	Boonreun Srithares (PT)	Seat held
Kalasin 2nd district	Pheu Thai	Veeravath Osatanukroh (PT)	Seat held
Kalasin 3rd district	Pheu Thai	Komdej Chaisivamongkol (PT)	Seat held
Kalasin 4th district	Pheu Thai	Peerapetch Sirikul (PT)	Seat held
Kalasin 5th district	Pheu Thai	Nipon Srithares (PT)	Seat held
Kalasin 6th district	Pheu Thai	Prasert Boonruang (PT)	Seat held
Kamphaeng Phet 1st district	Democrat	Pai Lik (PT)	Incumbent MP Sukvichcharn Musikul (DEM) defeated; first-time MP
Kamphaeng Phet 2nd district	Democrat	Preecha Musikul (DEM)	Seat held
Kamphaeng Phet 3rd district	Pheu Thai	Anunt Pol-unnuay (PT)	Incumbent MP Sumrun Sripangwong (DEM) defeated; seat held
Kamphaeng Phet 4th district	Pheu Thai	Parinya Roeksarai (PT)	Seat held
Kanchanaburi 1st district	Pheu Thai	General Somchai Wissanuwong (PT)	Incumbent MP Attapol Pothipipit (DEM) defeated; seat held
Kanchanaburi 2nd district	Bhumjaithai	Chadpun Dejkijsoonthorn (DEM)	Incumbent MP Suntad Jeenapak (BJT) defeated; first-time MP
Kanchanaburi 3rd district	Democrat	Surapong Piyachod (PT)	Incumbent MP Parames Potarakul (DEM) defeated; first-time MP
Kanchanaburi 4th district	Pheu Thai	Pracha Pothipipit (DEM)	Incumbent MP Lieutenant General Ma Po-ngam (PT) stood down
Kanchanaburi 5th district	Pheu Thai	Srisamorn Russameeleuksret (DEM)	Incumbent MP Lieutenant General Ma Po-ngam (PT) stood down; first-time MP
Khon Kaen 1st district	Pheu Thai	Jukkarin Patdamrongjit (PT)	Seat held
Khon Kaen 2nd district	Pheu Thai	Poom Sarapol (PT)	Seat held
Khon Kaen 3rd district	Pheu Thai	Jatuporn Jareonchua (PT)	Incumbent MP Panya Sripanya (BJT) defeated; seat held
Khon Kaen 4th district (Tambon Ban Kho, Tambon Samran, Tambon Non Thon, Tambon Sawathi, Khao Suan Kwang, Ubolratana and Ban Fang)	Bhumjaithai	Mookda Pongsombut (PT)	Incumbent MP Prajak Glawgraharn (BJT) stood down
Khon Kaen 5th district	Pheu Thai	Suchai Srisurapo (PT)	Seat held
Khon Kaen 6th district	Pheu Thai	Somsak Kiatsuranont (Speaker)	Seat held; previously elected as Pheu Thai
Khon Kaen 7th district	Pheu Thai	Nawat Tohjareonsook (PT)	Seat held
Khon Kaen 8th district	Pheu Thai	Duangkhae Unnoppon (PT)	Seat held
Khon Kaen 9th district	Pheu Thai	Lieutenant Preechapol Pongpanit (PT)	Seat held
Khon Kaen 10th district	Pheu Thai	Ruangdej Su-punfai (PT)	Seat held
Krabi 1st district	Democrat	Sakorn Kiewkhong (DEM)	Seat held
Krabi 2nd district	Democrat	Suchin Engchuan (DEM)	Incumbent MP Arcom Engchuan stood down to run at party-list proportional representation; seat held; first-time MP
Krabi 3rd district	Democrat	Pichet Panvichatikul (DEM)	Seat held
=== L ===
Constituency	Notional incumbent	Member returned	Notes
Lampang 1st district	Pheu Thai	Sompoj Saitep (PT)	Seat held
Lampang 2nd district	Pheu Thai	Wasit Payacaboot (PT)	Seat held
Lampang 3rd district	Pheu Thai	Jarus-rit Jandrasurin (PT)	Seat held
Lampang 4th district	Pheu Thai	Ittirut Jandrasurin (PT)	Seat held
Lamphun 1st district	Pheu Thai	Sa-nguan Pongmanee (PT)	Seat held
Lamphun 2nd district	Pheu Thai	Satapon Maneerut (PT)	Seat held
Loei 1st district	Pheu Thai	Preecha Rengsomboonsuk (PT)	Incumbent MP Pattana Sungkasub (BJT) disqualified; seat held
Loei 2nd district	Pheu Thai	Nuntana Timsuwan (PT)	Seat held
Loei 3rd district	Pheu Thai	Plengmanee Rengsomboonsuk (PT)	Seat held
Loei 4th district	Pheu Thai	Wanchai Boossaba (PT)	First-time MP
Lopburi 1st district	Democrat	Pichai Kiatwinaisakul (PT)	Incumbent MP Pongsri Tarapoom (DEM) defeated; First-time MP
Lopburi 2nd district	Chartthaipattana	Mallika Jirapunvanich (BJT)	Incumbent MP Suchart Lainumngern (PT) defeated; seat held; previously elected as Chartthaipattana
Lopburi 3rd district	Pheu Thai	Amnuay Klungpa (PT)	Seat held
Lopburi 4th district	Pheu Thai	Kiat Luangkachornwit (BJT)	Incumbent MP Niyom Vorapanya (PT) stood down to run at party-list proportional representation; first-time MP
=== M ===
Constituency	Notional incumbent	Member returned	Notes
Mae Hong Son 1st district	Democrat	Sombut Yasin (DEM)	Seat held
Maha Sarakham 1st district	Pheu Thai	Surajit Yontrakul (PT)	Seat held
Maha Sarakham 2nd district	Pheu Thai	Chaiwat Tinarut (PT)	Seat held
Maha Sarakham 3rd district	Bhumjaithai	Yuttapong Jarussatien (PT)	Incumbent MP Suchart Chokchaiwattanakorn (BJT) stood down to run at party-list proportional representation
Maha Sarakham 4th district	Pheu Thai	Jirawat Siripanich (PT)	Seat held
Maha Sarakham 5th district	Pheu Thai	Kusumalavadee Sirikomut (PT)	Incumbent MP Subpanyu Siripai and Prayut Siripanich stood down to run at party-list proportional representation; Seat held
Mukdahan 1st district	Bhumjaithai	Anurak Tangpanithanont (PT)	Former Ruam Chart Pattana MP, who was running as Bhumjaithai, Wornsulee Suwanparisut defeated; first-time MP
Mukdahan 2nd district	Chart Pattana Puea Pandin	Boontin Pratoomlee (PT)	Former Puea Pandin MP, who was running as Chart Pattana Puea Pandin, Wittaya Buddeewong defeated; first-time MP
=== N ===
Constituency	Notional incumbent	Member returned	Notes
Nakhon Nayok 1st district	Pheu Thai	Wuttichai Kittitanaesuan (BJT)	Seat held; previously elected as Pheu Thai
Nakhon Pathom 1st district	Democrat	Lieutenant Colonel Sinthop Kaewpijit (CTP)	Incumbent MP Marut Boonmee (DEM) stood down to run at Nakhon Pathom 5th district; first-time MP
Nakhon Pathom 2nd district	Pheu Thai	Ruttakorn Jenkitnarong (PT)	Seat held
Nakhon Pathom 3rd district	Pheu Thai	Korkiat Siriyasatien (PT)	Seat held
Nakhon Pathom 4th district	Pheu Thai	Anucha Sasomsub (PT)	Seat held
Nakhon Pathom 5th district	Pheu Thai	Padermchai Sasomsub (PT)	Incumbent MP Marut Boonmee (DEM) defeated; seat held
Nakhon Phanom 1st district	Bhumjaithai	Yutthajuck Ruengworaboon (PT)	Incumbent MP Suphachai Posu (BJT) defeated; first-time MP
Nakhon Phanom 2nd district	Pheu Thai	Manapon Jaroensri (PT)	Incumbent MP Suriya Promdee stood down; first-time MP
Nakhon Phanom 3rd district	Pheu Thai	Paijit Sriworakan (PT)	Seat held
Nakhon Phanom 4th district	Chart Pattana Puea Pandin	Chukan Kulwongsa (PT)	Former Puea Pandin MP, who was running as Chart Pattana Puea Pandin, Alongkot Maneekat defeated; first-time MP
Nakhon Ratchasima 1st district	Chart Pattana Puea Pandin	Wannarat Channukul (CPN)	Seat held; previously elected as Ruam Chart Pattana
Nakhon Ratchasima 2nd district	Chart Pattana Puea Pandin	Watcharapol Thomornsak (CPN)	Seat held; previously elected as Ruam Chart Pattana
Nakhon Ratchasima 3rd district	Chart Pattana Puea Pandin	Prasert Boonchaisuk (CPN)	Seat held; previously elected as Ruam Chart Pattana
Nakhon Ratchasima 4th district	Chart Pattana	Tasaneeya Ratanasate (PT)	Seat held; previously elected as Ruam Chart Pattana
Nakhon Ratchasima 5th district	Bhumjaithai	Kosol Pattama (PT)	Incumbent MP Pirom Polwiset (BJT) defeated; first-time MP
Nakhon Ratchasima 6th district	Chart Pattana Puea Pandin	Suchart Pinyo (PT)	Incumbent MP Somchai Chadpattanasiri (CPN) defeated; first-time MP
Nakhon Ratchasima 7th district	Chart Pattana Puea Pandin	Atirut Ratanasate (PT)	Incumbent MP Second lieutenant Ranongrak Suvanchavee (CPN) stood down to run at party-list proportional representation; first-time MP
Nakhon Ratchasima 8th district	Chart Pattana Puea Pandin	Jaroonpong Pansrinakorn (PT)	Incumbent MP Anuwat Wisetjindawat (CPN) defeated; first-time MP
Nakhon Ratchasima 9th district	Chart Pattana Puea Pandin	Polpee Suvanchavee (CPN)	Seat held; previously elected as Puea Pandin
Nakhon Ratchasima 10th district	Bhumjaithai	Boonjong Wongtrairut (BJT)	Seat held
Nakhon Ratchasima 11th district	Bhumjaithai	Sumpard Attawong (PT)	Former Puea Pandin MP, who was running as Bhumjaithai, Incumbent MP Jittarawan Wangsupakijkosol defeated; first-time MP
Nakhon Ratchasima 12th district	Chart Pattana Puea Pandin	Pranom Pokum (BJT)	Seat held; previously elected as Puea Pandin
Nakhon Ratchasima 13th district	Matubhum	Sirasit Lerdduaylarb (PT)	Former Pheu Thai MP, who was running as Matubhum, Police Lieutenant Colonel Somchai Pesprasert defeated; seat held; first-time MP
Nakhon Ratchasima 14th district	Pheu Thai	Prasert Janruangtong (PT)	Seat held
Nakhon Ratchasima 15th district	Chart Pattana Puea Pandin	Visit Pittayapon (BJT)	Former Pheu Thai MP, who was running as Chart Pattana Puea Pandin, Boonlert Krutkuntod defeated
Nakhon Sawan 1	Democrat	Songkarn Jitsuthipakorn (DEM)	Seat held
Nakhon Sawan 2	Chartthaipattana	Distut Kumpragob (PT)	Former Pracharaj MP, who was running as Chartthaipattana, Somchai Jareonchairit and incumbent MP Somkuan Ob-om (DEM) defeated; first-time MP
Nakhon Sawan 3	Pheu Thai	Sunchai Wongsoonthorn (PT)	Seat held
Nakhon Sawan 4	Bhumjaithai	Police Lieutenant Colonel Nukul Sangsiri (PT)	Incumbent MP Peeradej Siriwansant (CTP) defeated; seat held; previously elected as Bhumjaithai
Nakhon Sawan 5	Pheu Thai	Tayat Kiatchusak (PT)	First-time MP
Nakhon Sawan 6	Chartthaipattana	Prasat Tonprasert (CPN)	Incumbent MP Niroj Soonthonleka (CTP) defeated
Nakhon Si Thammarat 1st district	Democrat	Apichart Sakdiset (DEM)	Seat held
Nakhon Si Thammarat 2nd district	Democrat	Narisa Aditepvorapun (DEM)	Seat held
Nakhon Si Thammarat 3rd district	Democrat	Witthaya Kaewparadai (DEM)	Seat held
Nakhon Si Thammarat 4th district	Democrat	Apichart Karikarn (DEM)	Seat held
Nakhon Si Thammarat 5th district	Democrat	Prakorb Rattanapun (DEM)	Seat held
Nakhon Si Thammarat 6th district	Democrat	Tepthai Senpong (DEM)	Seat held
Nakhon Si Thammarat 7th district	Democrat	Chinnavorn Boonyakiat (DEM)	Seat held
Nakhon Si Thammarat 8th district	Democrat	Surachet Massadit (DEM)	Seat held
Nakhon Si Thammarat 9th district	Democrat	Pimpattra Vichaikul (DEM)	Seat held
Nan 1st district	Pheu Thai	Sirinthorn Ramasute (PT)	Seat held
Nan 2nd district	Pheu Thai	Chonlanan Srikaew (PT)	Seat held
Nan 3rd district	Pheu Thai	Nattapong Supriyasilp (PT)	Incumbent MP Wanlop Supriyasilp stood down to run at party-list proportional representation; seat held; first-time MP
Narathiwat 1st district (Mueang Narathiwat District and Tak Bai)	Thaen Khun Phaendin	Kuasem Kujinaming (DEM)	Seat previously for Mueang Narathiwat, Yi-ngo, Bacho, Rueso, Si Sakhon, Tak Bai and Su-ngai Kolok Incumbent MP Vaemahadi Vaeda-o (TKP) stood down to run at party-list proportional representation; First-time MP
Narathiwat 2nd district (Su-ngai Padi, Su-ngai Kolok and Waeng)	Chartthaipattana	Surachet Vaeasae (DEM)	Incumbent MP Watchara Yawohasan (CTP) stood down to run at Narathiwat 4st district
Narathiwat 3rd district	Matubhum	Rumree Marma (DEM)	Incumbent Matubhum MP Nujmuddein Uma and Niaris Jetapiwat (CTP) defeated
Narathiwat 4th district	Democrat	Jeaming Totayong (DEM)	Incumbent Chartthaipattana MP Watchara Yawohasan defeated; Seat held
Nong Bua Lamphu 1st district	Pheu Thai	Pitsanu Huttasongkro (PT)	Seat held
Nong Bua Lamphu 2nd district	Pheu Thai	Chaiya Promma (PT)	Seat held
Nong Bua Lamphu 3rd district	Pheu Thai	Wichai Samitr (PT)	Seat held
Nong Khai 1st district	Pheu Thai	Acting sub lieutenant Pongpun Soonthornchai (PT)	Seat held
Nong Khai 2nd district	Pheu Thai	Somkid Baltaisong (PT)	Seat held
Nong Khai 3rd district	Pheu Thai	Chompoo Jantatong (PT)	Seat held
Nonthaburi 1st district	Pheu Thai	Nithat Sinon (PT)	Seat held
Nonthaburi 2nd district	Pheu Thai	Udomdet Rattanasathian (PT)	Seat held
Nonthaburi 3rd district	Bhumjaithai	Walaiphon Atchariyaprasit (PT)	Incumbent MP Manasak Chanprasong (BJT) defeated; first-time MP
Nonthaburi 4th district	Pheu Thai	Montri Tangcharoentavorn (PT)	Incumbent MP Colonel Apiwan Wiriyachai stood down to run at party-list proportional representation; seat held; first-time MP
Nonthaburi 5th district	Democrat	Wanchai Charoennonthasit (PT)	Incumbent MP Thotsaphon Phengsom (DEM) defeated; first-time MP
Nonthaburi 6th district	Democrat	Chalong Riewrang (PT)	Incumbent MP Narong Chantanapradit (DEM) defeated
=== P ===
Constituency	Notional incumbent	Member returned	Notes
Pathum Thani 1st district	Pheu Thai	Sutin Noppakum (PT)	Seat held
Pathum Thani 2nd district	Pheu Thai	Surapong Ung-umponvilai (PT)	Seat held
Pathum Thani 3rd district	Pracharaj	Somsak Jaikleaw (PT)	Incumbent MP Chanakarn Yuenyong (RP) stood down; first-time MP
Pathum Thani 4th district	Pheu Thai	Ponpimol Thammasarn (PT)	Seat held
Pathum Thani 5th district	Pheu Thai	Acting sub-lieutenant Sumeth Rittakanee (PT)	Seat held
Pathum Thani 6th district	Pheu Thai	Chuchart Harnsawat (PT)	Seat held
Pattani 1st district	Democrat	Anwar Salae (DEM)	Seat held
Pattani 2nd district	Democrat	Ismael Benibrohom (DEM)	Seat held
Pattani 3rd district	Bhumjaithai	Anumut Susaror (MB)	Incumbent former Puea Pandin MP, who was running as Bhumjaithai, Nimookta Wabar defeated; first-time MP
Pattani 4th district	Chart Pattana Puea Pandin	Sommut Benjaluck (BJT)	Incumbent MP Yusree Susaror (CPN) stood down; first-time MP
Phang Nga 1st district	Democrat	Kantawan Tontian Kuljanyawiwat (DEM)	Seat held
Phatthalung 1st district	Democrat	Supatcharee Thammapetr (DEM)	Seat held
Phatthalung 2nd district	Democrat	Nipit Intarasombut (DEM)	Seat held
Phatthalung 3rd district	Democrat	Naris Khumnurak (DEM)	Seat held
Phayao 1st district	Pheu Thai	Arunee Chumnarnya (PT)	Seat held
Phayao 2nd district	Pheu Thai	Wisut Chainaroon (PT)	Seat held
Phayao 3rd district	Pheu Thai	Pairoj Tonbunjong (PT)	Seat held
Phetchabun 1st district	Chartthaipattana	Sutus Jansangsri (PT)	Incumbent MP Vijit Ponpruettipun (CTP) defeated
Phetchabun 2nd district	Pheu Thai	Juckkarut Puachuay (PT)	Seat held
Phetchabun 3rd district	Pheu Thai	Yupparach Buain (DEM)	Incumbent MP Narongkorn Chawalsuntati (PT) defeated; first-time MP
Phetchabun 4th district	Pheu Thai	Wanpen Prompat (PT)	Seat held
Phetchabun 5th district	Pheu Thai	Surasak Anunkapant (PT)	Seat held
Phetchabun 6th district	Pheu Thai	Iam Tongjaisod (PT)	Seat held
Phetchaburi 1st district	Democrat	Attapon Pollabutr (DEM)	Incumbent MP Alongkorn Pollabutr stood down to run at party-list proportional representation; seat held; first-time MP
Phetchaburi 2nd district	Democrat	Kumpol Supapang (DEM)	Seat held
Phetchaburi 3rd district	Democrat	Apichart Supapang (DEM)	Seat held
Phichit 1st district	Chart Pattana Puea Pandin	Vinai Pattaraprasit (CTP)	Seat held; previously elected as Ruam Chart Pattana
Phichit 2nd district	Democrat	Narapat Kaewtong (DEM)	Seat held
Phichit 3rd district	Chartthaipattana	Siriwat Kachornprasart (CTP)	Seat held
Phitsanulok 1st district	Democrat	Warong Dechkijwikrom (DEM)	Seat held
Phitsanulok 2nd district	Chartthaipattana	Noppol Luangtongtara (PT)	Former Social Action MP, who was running as Chartthaipattana, Montchai Wiwattanart defeated; first-time MP
Phitsanulok 3rd district	Democrat	Juti Kraileuk (DEM)	Seat held
Phitsanulok 4th district	Pheu Thai	Niyom Changpinij (PT)	Seat held
Phitsanulok 5th district	Democrat	Makorn Machim (DEM)	Seat held
Phra Nakhon Si Ayutthaya 1st district	Chartthaipattana	Kuakul Darnchaivijitr (CTP)	Incumbent MP Surachet Chaigosol (PT) defeated; seat held
Phra Nakhon Si Ayutthaya 2nd district	Pheu Thai	Pong Cheewanun (PT)	Seat held
Phra Nakhon Si Ayutthaya 3rd district	Pheu Thai	Surasak Punjaroenworakul (PT)	Seat held
Phra Nakhon Si Ayutthaya 4th district	Pheu Thai	Wittaya Buranasiri (PT)	Seat held
Phra Nakhon Si Ayutthaya 5th district	Pheu Thai	Ong-art Wachirapong (PT)	Incumbent MP Surachet Chaigosol stood down to run at Phra Nakhon Si Ayutthaya 1st district; seat held; first-time MP
Phrae 1st district	Pheu Thai	Parnhatai Saereeruk (PT)	Seat held
Phrae 2nd district	Pheu Thai	Niyom Vivattanadiskul (PT)	Seat held
Phrae 3rd district	Pheu Thai	Worawaj Auaapinyakul (PT)	Seat held
Phuket 1st district	Democrat	Anchalee Wanich Theppabutr (DEM)	Incumbent MP Tossapon Theppabutr stood down; seat held
Phuket 2nd district	Democrat	Rewat Areerob (DEM)	Seat held
Prachinburi 1st district	Bhumjaithai	Amnart Vilawan (BJT)	Seat held
Prachinburi 2nd district	Social Action	Chayut Pummakarnjana (CTP)	Seat held; previously elected as Social Action
Prachinburi 3rd district	Chart Pattana Puea Pandin	Paecharin Siangjaroen (BJT)	Former Puea Pandin MP, who was running as Chart Pattana Puea Pandin, Kongkris Hongwilai defeated; first-time MP
Prachuap Khiri Khan 1st district	Democrat	Montri Panoinont (DEM)	Seat held
Prachuap Khiri Khan 2nd district	Democrat	Chelermchai Srion (DEM)	Seat held
Prachuap Khiri Khan 3rd district	Democrat	Pramual Pongtavaradech (DEM)	Seat held
=== R ===
Constituency	Notional incumbent	Member returned	Notes
Ranong 1st district	Democrat	Wirach Romyen (DEM)	Seat held
Ratchaburi 1st district	Bhumjaithai	Manit Nopamornbodee (BJT)	Seat held
Ratchaburi 2nd district	Democrat	Boonying Nitikarnjana (BJT)	Incumbent MP Samart Piriyapunyapon (DEM) defeated; first-time MP
Ratchaburi 3rd district	Democrat	Pareena Kraikoopt (CTP)	Incumbent MP Preechaya Kumjaroen (DEM) defeated
Ratchaburi 4th district	Democrat	Chaworalut Chinthammamitr (BJT)	Incumbent MP Yossak Cheevawinyu (DEM) defeated
Ratchaburi 5th district	Chartthaipattana	Boondumrong Prasertsopa (BJT)	Incumbent MP Pareena Pajareeyangkul (CTP) stood down; first-time MP
Rayong 1st district	Democrat	Satit Pitudecha (DEM)	Seat held
Rayong 2nd district	Democrat	Bunyat Jettanajan (DEM)	Seat held
Rayong 3rd district	Democrat	Tara Pitudecha (DEM)	Seat held
Rayong 4th district	Democrat	Vichai Lumsutti (DEM)	Seat held
Roi Et 1st district	Pheu Thai	Warapong Punsila (PT)	Seat held
Roi Et 2nd district	Pheu Thai	Chalard Karmchuang (PT)	Seat held
Roi Et 3rd district	Pheu Thai	Niramit Sujaree (PT)	Former Puea Pandin MP, who was running as Chart Pattana Puea Pandin, Rutchanee Polsue defeated; seat held
Roi Et 4th district	Pheu Thai	Nirun Namuangruck (PT)	
Roi Et 5th district	Pheu Thai	Aim-on Sintuprai (PT)	Incumbent MP Piyarach Muensan stood down; first-time MP
Roi Et 6th district	Pheu Thai	Kitti Somsub (PT)	Seat held
Roi Et 7th district	Pheu Thai	Sakda Kongpetch (PT)	Seat held
Roi Et 8th district	Pheu Thai	Seksit Wainiyompong (PT)	Seat held
=== S ===
Constituency	Notional incumbent	Member returned	Notes
Sa Kaeo 1st district	Pracharaj	Tanis Thienthong (PT)	Seat held; previously elected as Pracharaj
Sa Kaeo 2nd district	Pracharaj	Treenuch Thienthong (PT)	Seat held; previously elected as Pracharaj
Sa Kaeo 3rd district	Pracharaj	Sorawong Thienthong (PT)	Seat held; previously elected as Pracharaj
Sakon Nakhon 1st district	Bhumjaithai	Apichart Teerasawasdichai (PT)	Incumbent MP Taweewat Ritruechai (BJT) stood down
Sakon Nakhon 2nd district	Pheu Thai	Niyom Vejkama (PT)	Seat held
Sakon Nakhon 3rd district	Bhumjaithai	Naris Tongtirach (PT)	Incumbent MP Chalermchart Karoon (BJT) defeated
Sakon Nakhon 4th district	Pheu Thai	Pattana Sappaso (PT)	First-time MP
Sakon Nakhon 5th district	Pheu Thai	Anuruk Boonsol (PT)	Seat held
Sakon Nakhon 6th district	Pheu Thai	Seri Saranun (PT)	Former Pheu Thai MP, who was running as Democrat, Joompot Boonyai defeated; seat held
Sakon Nakhon 7th district	Pheu Thai	Kasem Aooppara (PT)	Seat held
Samut Prakan 1st district	Pheu Thai	Aroonluck Kijlertpairoj (PT)	Seat held
Samut Prakan 2nd district	Pheu Thai	Prasert Chaikijdennapalai (PT)	Seat held
Samut Prakan 3rd district	Pheu Thai	Anusara Youngtrong (PT)	Seat held
Samut Prakan 4th district	Pheu Thai	Worachai Hayma (PT)	Former Pheu Thai MP, who was running as Bhumjaithai, Jirapat Limsakulsirirut defeated; seat held; first-time MP
Samut Prakan 5th district	Pheu Thai	Saliltip Sukkawat (PT)	Former Pheu Thai MP, who was running as Bhumjaithai, Krungsriwilai Sutinpeuk defeated; seat held
Samut Prakan 6th district	Pheu Thai	Rewadee Rassamitat (BJT)	Incumbent MP Naruemon Tharndamrong (PT) defeated
Samut Prakan 7th district	Pheu Thai	Pracha Prasobdee (PT)	Seat held
Samut Sakhon 1st district	Democrat	Kanchit Tubsuwan (DEM)	Seat held
Samut Sakhon 2nd district	Democrat	Boonchu Niltanom (PT)	Incumbent MP Lieutenant commander Sutham Rahong (DEM) defeated; first-time MP
Samut Sakhon 3rd district	Pheu Thai	Nitirut Soonthornvorn (DEM)	Incumbent MP Montol Kraiwatnasorn (PT) defeated; first-time MP
Samut Songkhram 1st district	Democrat	Rungsima Rodrassamee (DEM)	Seat held
Saraburi 1st district	Democrat	Kallaya Rungvijitchai (DEM)	Seat held
Saraburi 2nd district	Pheu Thai	Auttapol Wongprayoon (PT)	Former Pheu Thai MP, who was running as Bhumjaithai, Sub-lieutenant Parapol Adireksarn defeated; seat held; first-time MP
Saraburi 3rd district	Democrat	Watcharapong Kuvijitsuwan (BJT)	Seat held; previously elected as Democrat
Saraburi 4th district	Democrat	Ong-art Wongprayoon (PT)	Seat held; previously elected as Democrat
Satun 1st district	Democrat	Thanin Jaisamutr (CTP)	Incumbent MP Asi Mahamadyoungkee (DEM) defeated
Satun 2nd district	Democrat	Horchalee Marem (DEM)	Seat held
Sing Buri 1st district	Chartthaipattana	Surasarn Pasuk (PT)	Former Democrat MP, who was running as Chartthaipattana, Chotiwut Thanakamanusorn defeated; first-time MP
Sisaket 1st district	Pheu Thai	Thanet Kruarut (PT)	Seat held
Sisaket 2nd district	Pheu Thai	Surachart Charnpradit (PT)	Seat held
Sisaket 3rd district	Bhumjaithai	Udomluck Pengnorapat (BJT)	Seat held
Sisaket 4th district	Pheu Thai	Wiwatchai Hotrawaisaya (PT)	Seat held
Sisaket 5th district	Pheu Thai	Teera Traisaranakul (PT)	Seat held
Sisaket 6th district	Pheu Thai	Weerapol Jitsumrit (PT)	Seat held
Sisaket 7th district	New Aspiration	Manop Jarusdumrongrit (PT)	Former Pracharaj MP, who was running as New Aspiration, Jirawadee Jungwaranont defeated
Sisaket 8th district	Pheu Thai	Paween Saejung (PT)	Seat held
Songkhla 1st district	Democrat	Jua Ratchasee (DEM)	Seat held
Songkhla 2nd district	Democrat	Pirapol Laparojkij (DEM)	Incumbent MP Larbsak Laparojkij stood down; seat held
Songkhla 3rd district	Democrat	Wirat Kunlayasiri (DEM)	Seat held
Songkhla 4th district	Democrat	Chaiwut Pongpaew (DEM)	Seat held
Songkhla 5th district	Democrat	Prapon Ake-uru (DEM)	Seat held
Songkhla 6th district	Democrat	Thaworn Senniam (DEM)	Seat held
Songkhla 7th district	Democrat	Sirichok Sopa (DEM)	Seat held
Songkhla 8th district	Democrat	Police Major General Surin Palare (DEM)	Incumbent MP Naracha Suwit stood down; seat held
Sukhothai 1st district	Democrat	Wirat Viriyapong (DEM)	Seat held
Sukhothai 2nd district	Democrat	Sumpun Tangbenjapol (DEM)	Seat held
Sukhothai 3rd district	Chart Pattana Puea Pandin	Juckkrawal Chaiwirutnukul (BJT)	Former Social Action MP, who was running as Chart Pattana Puea Pandin, Somjet Limpapun defeated; first-time MP
Sukhothai 4th district	Chartthaipattana	Manoo Pookprasert (BJT)	Incumbent MP Araya Choomduang (CTP) defeated; first-time MP
Suphan Buri 1st district	Chartthaipattana	Sorrachud Sujitt (CTP)	Incumbent MP Nitiwat Jansawang stood down; seat held; first-time MP
Suphan Buri 2nd district	Chartthaipattana	Charnchai Prasertsuwan (CTP)	Seat held
Suphan Buri 3rd district	Chartthaipattana	Noppadol Martsri (CTP)	Seat held
Suphan Buri 4th district	Chartthaipattana	Patcharee Pothasuthon (CTP)	Seat held
Suphan Buri 5th district	Chartthaipattana	Saharut Kulsri (PT)	Incumbent MP Jayraja Tiengtham (CTP) stood down; first-time MP
Surat Thani 1st district	Democrat	Thanee Thaugsuban (DEM)	Seat held
Surat Thani 2nd district	Democrat	Suthep Thaugsuban (DEM)	Seat held
Surat Thani 3rd district	Democrat	Sopa Karnjana (DEM)	Incumbent MP Prapon Nilwatcharamanee stood down; seat held; first-time MP
Surat Thani 4th district	Democrat	Chain Thaugsuban (DEM)	Seat held
Surat Thani 5th district	Democrat	Sinit Lertkrai (DEM)	Seat held
Surat Thani 6th district	Democrat	Theerapat Pringsulka (DEM)	Incumbent MP Nipa Pringsulka stood down; seat held; first-time MP
Surin 1st district	Bhumjaithai	Pakorn Mungjaroenpon (BJT)	Seat held
Surin 2nd district	Bhumjaithai	Piyada Mungjaroenpon (PT)	Former Puea Pandin MP, who was running as Bhumjaithai, Kittisak Rungtanakiat defeated; first-time MP
Surin 3rd district	Bhumjaithai	Kunakorn Preechachanachai (PT)	First-time MP
Surin 4th district	Chartthaipattana	Teeyai Poonsrithanakul (PT)	Former Puea Pandin MP, who was running as Bhumjaithai, Sathit Tepwongsirirut and incumbent MP Kunnikar Jaroenpun (CTP) defeated
Surin 5th district	Bhumjaithai	Kroomanit Sungpum (PT)	Former Puea Pandin MP, who was running as Bhumjaithai, Yunyong Ruampattana defeated
Surin 6th district	Bhumjaithai	Police Sergeant Prasit Chaisriya (PT)	Former Puea Pandin MP, who was running as Chartthaipattana, Theeratut Tiewjaroensopa and Former Matubhum MP, who was running as Bhumjaithai, Farida Sulaimarn (BJT) defeated; first-time MP
Surin 7th district	Bhumjaithai	Sombut Srisurin (PT)	Incumbent MP Lertsak Tussanasetr (BJT) defeated
Surin 8th district	Bhumjaithai	Chusak Aektong (PT)	Incumbent Suparuck Kuanha (BJT) defeated; first-time MP
=== T ===
Constituency	Notional incumbent	Member returned	Notes
Tak 1st district	Democrat	Tianchai Suwanpen (DEM)	Seat held
Tak 2nd district	Democrat	Chaiwut Bunnawat (DEM)	Seat held
Tak 3rd district	Democrat	Tanitpol Chaiyanun (DEM)	Seat held
Trang 1st district	Democrat	Sukij Uttopakorn (DEM)	Seat held
Trang 2nd district	Democrat	Satit Wongnongtoey (DEM)	Seat held
Trang 3rd district	Democrat	Somchai Losataponpipit (DEM)	Seat held
Trang 4th district	Democrat	Somboon Utaiwiankul (DEM)	Seat held
Trat 1st district	Democrat	Teera Saluckpetch (DEM)	Seat held
=== U ===
Constituency	Notional incumbent	Member returned	Notes
Ubon Ratchathani 1st district	Pheu Thai	Worasit Kaltinunt (PT)	Seat held
Ubon Ratchathani 2nd district	Democrat	Supachai Srila (DEM)	Seat held
Ubon Ratchathani 3rd district	Democrat	Wuttipong Nambutr (DEM)	Seat held
Ubon Ratchathani 4th district	Pheu Thai	Supol Fongngam (PT)	Seat held
Ubon Ratchathani 5th district	Pheu Thai	Suttichai Jaroonnetr (PT)	Seat held
Ubon Ratchathani 6th district	Chart Pattana Puea Pandin	Pisit Suntapun (PT)	Former Puea Pandin MP, who was running as Chart Pattana Puea Pandin, Udon Tongprasert defeated; first-time MP
Ubon Ratchathani 7th district	Pheu Thai	Chuwit Pitakponpunlop (PT)	Seat held
Ubon Ratchathani 8th district	Democrat	Boonthida Somchai (DEM)	Incumbent MP Issara Somchai stood down to run at party-list proportional representation; seat held; first-time MP
Ubon Ratchathani 9th district	Chart Pattana Puea Pandin	Punya Jintavech (PT)	Former Puea Pandin MP, who was running as Chart Pattana Puea Pandin, Suchart Tontiwanichchanont defeated
Ubon Ratchathani 10th district	Chartthaipattana	Somkid Chueakong (PT)	Incumbent MP Udon Jintavech defeated; first-time MP
Ubon Ratchathani 11th district	Chartthaipattana	Tun Jintavech (CTP)	Seat held
Udon Thani 1st district	Bhumjaithai	Sarawut Petchpanompon (PT)	Incumbent MP Cherdchai Vichienwan (BJT) stood down to run at Udon Thani 2nd district
Udon Thani 2nd district	Pheu Thai	Police Lieutenant Colonel Suratin Pimarnmaykin (PT)	Incumbent MP Cherdchai Vichienwan (BJT) defeated; seat held
Udon Thani 3rd district	Pheu Thai	Anun Sripun (PT)	Seat held
Udon Thani 4th district	Pheu Thai	Kajit Chainikom (PT)	
Udon Thani 5th district	Pheu Thai	Tongdee Manissarn (PT)	Seat held
Udon Thani 6th district	Pheu Thai	Kiatudom Maynasawas (PT)	Seat held
Udon Thani 7th district	Pheu Thai	Jakkapat Chaiyasarn (PT)	Seat held
Udon Thani 8th district	Pheu Thai	Kriengsak Faisee-ngram (PT)	Seat held
Udon Thani 9th district	Pheu Thai	Tiepjutha Kaokham (PT)	Incumbent MP Vichien Kaokham stood down; seat held; first-time MP

== Changes & by-elections ==
- Acting sub-lieutenant Sumeth Rittakanee (PT, Pathum Thani 5th district) resigned his Pathum Thani 5th district seat on 8 March 2012 in order to contest in Pathum Thani Provincial Administration Organization election. At a by-election on 21 April 2012, Kiattisak Songsaeng (DEM) was elected to replace him.
- Chinnicha Wongsawat (PT, Chiang Mai 3rd district) was banned from politics 5 years by supreme court on 19 April 2012. At the by-election on 2 June 2012, Kasem Nimmolrat was elected to replace her.
- Satapon Maneerut (PT, Lamphun 2nd district) died of nephropathy on 14 July 2012. At the by-election on 26 August 2012, Rangsan Maneerat was elected to replace him.
- Kiat Luangkachornwit (BJT, Lopburi 4th district) was disqualified by supreme court on 28 December 2012. At the by-election on 9 February 2013, Pahol Vorapanya (PT) was elected to replace him.
- Suthep Thaugsuban (DEM, Surat Thani 2nd district), Thaworn Senniam (DEM, Songkhla 6th district), Satit Wongnongtoey (DEM, Trang 2nd district), Witthaya Kaewparadai (DEM, Nakhon Si Thammarat 3rd district), Issara Somchai (DEM, Party-list), Chumpol Junsai (DEM, Chumphon 1st district), Putthipong Poonnagunt (DEM, Bangkok 7th district), Ekkanat Promphan (DEM, Bangkok 29th district) and Natthapol Theepsuwan (DEM, Bangkok 26th district) resigned on 11 November 2013 in order to lead 2013 Thai protests.
