= Sompong Amornwiwat =

Thai politician (born 1941)

Sompong Amornvivat MPCh MWM
- สมพงษ์ อมรวิวัฒน์
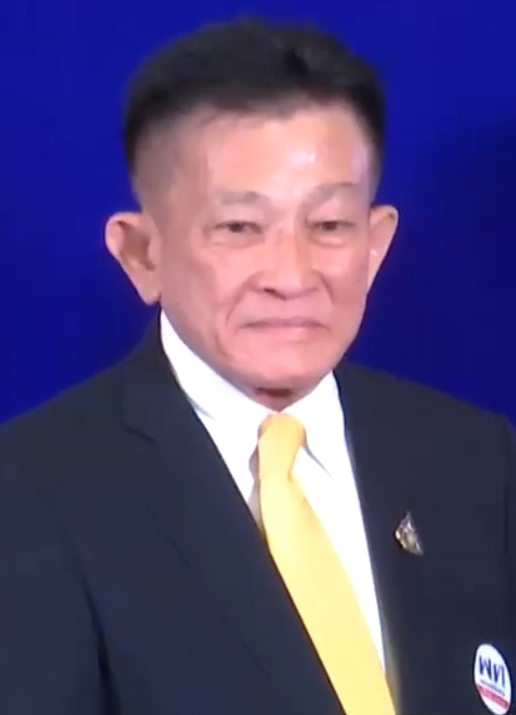
- Sompong Amornvivat in 2019

Leader of the Opposition
- In office 17 August 2019 – 28 October 2021
- Monarch: Vajiralongkorn
- Prime Minister: Prayut Chan-o-cha
- Preceded by: Abhisit Vejjajiva (2013)
- Succeeded by: Chonlanan Srikaew

Leader of the Pheu Thai Party
- In office 12 July 2019 – 28 October 2021
- Preceded by: Viroj Pao-in
- Succeeded by: Chonlanan Srikaew

Deputy Prime Minister of Thailand
- In office 24 September 2008 – 2 December 2008
- Prime Minister: Somchai Wongsawat

Minister of Foreign Affairs
- In office 24 September 2008 – 2 December 2008
- Prime Minister: Somchai Wongsawat
- Preceded by: Saroj Chavanavirat
- Succeeded by: Kasit Piromya

Minister of Justice
- In office 6 February 2008 – 9 September 2008
- Prime Minister: Samak Sundaravej
- Preceded by: Charnchai Likhitchittha
- Succeeded by: Somsak Kiatsuranont

Minister of Industry
- In office 14 April 1992 – 9 June 1992
- Prime Minister: Suchinda Kraprayoon
- Preceded by: Sippanon Kettat
- Succeeded by: Sippanon Kettat

Minister of Labour and Social Services
- In office 5 October 1998 – 9 July 1999
- Prime Minister: Chuan Leekpai
- Preceded by: Trairong Suwankiri
- Succeeded by: Threewut Sukosol
- In office 14 April 1992 – 9 June 1992
- Prime Minister: Chuan Leekpai
- Preceded by: Paitoon Kaewthong
- Succeeded by: Pisan Moonsartsathorn

Personal details
- Born: 3 July 1941 (age 85) Chiang Mai, Thailand
- Party: Pheu Thai
- Other political affiliations: Thai Rak Thai; People’s Power
- Spouse: Phetchari Amornwiwat
- Children: Julapun Amornvivat
- Education: Curry College; Chiang Mai University

Sompong Amornvivat (Thai: สมพงษ์ อมรวิวัฒน์; born 3 July 1941) is a Thai politician for the Pheu Thai Party.

== Early life and education ==
Sompong Amornvivat was born on 3 July 1941. He is the younger brother of Police General Sawat Amornvivat, a former Chief of Police. He graduated from primary and secondary education at Amnuay Silpa School and holds a Bachelor of Business Administration from Curry College in the United States and holds a master's degree in political science (politics and government) from Chiang Mai University.

== Political careers ==
On 2 December 2008, the Constitutional Court of Thailand passed a resolution to dissolve the People's Power Party and cut the political rights of the party executive committee for 5 years each. Therefore, as he was Deputy Prime Minister and the Minister of Foreign Affairs at the time, and the Deputy Leader of the People Power Party, he had to vacate the position and was disqualified for 5 years. During his disqualification period, he attended the senior executive course of the Capital Market Academy of the Stock Exchange of Thailand, in the 11th edition.

In the past, Sompong was the leader of the Group 16, with important members of the Group 16, namely Suchat Tancharoen, Newin Chidchob, Sora-at Klinpratoom under Thai Rak Thai together. After the Thai Rak Thai Party was dissolved, Sompong took over the chairmanship of the Thai Rak Thai Group.

In the 2014 general election of the Thai House of Representatives, he was elected in the roster for Pheu Thai Party, but the election was invalidated. In 2018, He moved to join the Pheu Thai Party and was elected to the position of party leader until in November he resigned from being a member. In the 2019 general election of the Thai House of Representatives he ran in the 5th constituency for Chiang Mai Province in the name of the Pheu Thai Party and was elected.

In 2018, he was nominated as the President of the House of Representatives, and finished in second place behind Chuan Leekpai MP of the Democrat Party, 258 votes to 235, with one abstention. As the leader of Pheu Thai, the largest opposition party in the legislature, Sompong has been the leader of the opposition in the House of Representatives since 2019.

On 28 October 2021, At the Pheu Thai Party Annual General Meeting of 2021 Sompong resigned as Pheu Thai Party leader to provide opportunities for new generations to continue their duties, he will turn to support the strategy and direction of the party.

== Personal life ==
Sompong married with Pecharee Amornvivat, having children as follows business executive Roselyn Amornvivat, oil executive Pongpun Amornvivat, architect and designer Goil Amornvivat and Thai politician Julapun Amornvivat, who is currently serving as Thailand's Deputy Minister of Finance.

== Royal decorations ==
Sompong has received the following royal decorations in the Honours System of Thailand:

- Knight Grand Cordon (Special Class) of The Most Noble Order of the Crown of Thailand
- Knight Grand Cordon (Special Class) of the Most Exalted Order of the White Elephant
