= Wisut Chaiyarun =

Thai politician

- วิสุทธิ์ ไชยณรุณ

Government Chief Whip in the House of Representatives
- In office 22 February 2024 – 7 September 2025
- Prime Minister: Srettha Thavisin; Paetongtarn Shinawatra

Personal details
- Party: Pheu Thai

Wisut Chaiyarun (Thai: วิสุทธิ์ ไชยณรุณ) is a Thai politician serving as Government Chief Whip in the House of Representatives since 2024. Wisut is a member of the Pheu Thai Party.
