= Apiwan Wiriyachai =

Thai politician (1949–2014)

- อภิวันท์ วิริยะชัย
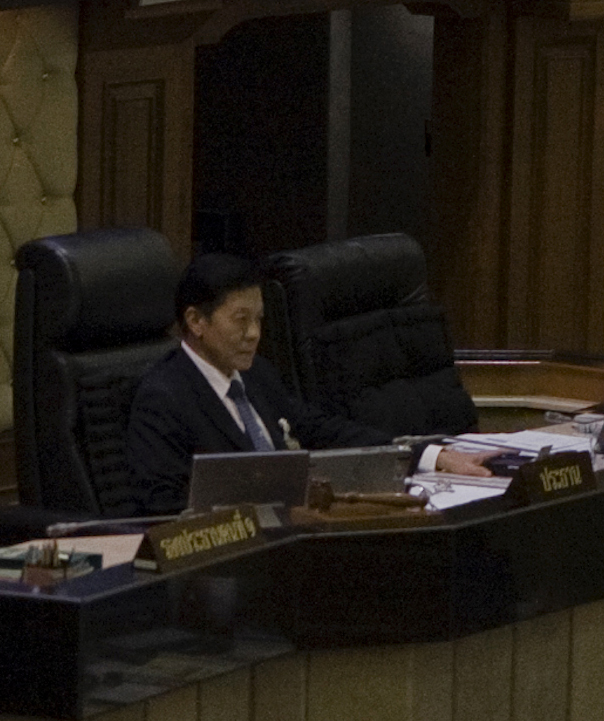
- Apiwan Wiriyachai during No Confidence debate in 2011

Deputy Speaker of the House of Representatives
- In office 22 January 2008 – 10 May 2011
- Preceded by: Lalita Rerksamran
- Succeeded by: Wisut Chainarun

Personal details
- Born: 20 April 1949 Nonthaburi, Thailand
- Died: 6 October 2014 (aged 65) Philippines
- Party: Pheu Thai Party
- Other political affiliations: United Front for Democracy Against Dictatorship
- Spouse: Ratchanee Wiriyachai
- Education: Chulachomklao Royal Military Academy; Illinois Institute of Technology (Ph.D.)
- Profession: Politician; civil servant; army officer
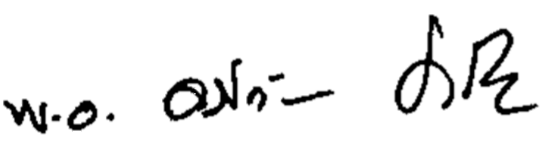
- Signature

Military service
- Allegiance: Thailand
- Branch/service: Royal Thai Army
- Rank: Colonel

Apiwan Wiriyachai (Thai: อภิวันท์ วิริยะชัย; April 20, 1949 – October 6, 2014) was a Thai politician (Pheu Thai Party) and a member of the United Front for Democracy Against Dictatorship.

== Early career ==
In 1996 Apiwan entered politics as a New Aspiration Party MP for the province of his birth. A close confidant of provincial godfather Sanoh Thienthong, Apiwan followed his mentor into the Thai Rak Thai Party and became the party's MP for Nonthaburi in the 2001 general election, a seat he would hold through all subsequent elections. He served as chief of staff to the defence minister from 2002 to 2004.

Following Sanoh's resignation from Thai Rak Thai, Apiwan gravitated towards Thaksin Shinawatra's inner circle.

== Political career ==
Following Pheu Thai's 2011 electoral victory Apiwan was at one point tipped to become the speaker of the house, but his close association with the UDD eventually forced the party to pick Somsak Kiatsuranont instead.

In October 2012 Apiwan proposed that Charupong Ruangsuwan serve as leader of the Pheu Thai Party. His nomination went unchallenged.

In early November 2013 Apiwan was among the seven Red Shirt MPs who voted to pass a controversial amnesty bill that would have pardoned those responsible for the army's massacre of UDD protesters in 2010. The bill met widespread opposition from both the UDD and the opposition, prompting the government to abandon it.

The bill's retraction did not save the government, however. The opposition coalesced into the People's Democratic Reform Committee protest movement which proceeded to paralyse Yingluck Shinawatra's government and ultimately pave the way for a military coup on May 22, 2014. A lèse-majesté charge was filed against Apiwan in the immediate aftermath of the army's seizure of power, prompting him to flee to the Philippines, where he died of a lung infection on October 6.

== Controversies ==
Apiwan believed that the legitimacy of the monarchy rests on the faith and goodwill of the populace, and was an opponent of Thailand's draconian lèse-majesté law, which, in his view, has been used without the king's consent. Apiwan was explicit in his approval of several known republicans or critics of the prevalent ultraroyalism, ranging from Red Shirt activist Sombat Boonngam-anong to the Nitirat Group, and had also praised Somsak Jeamteerasakul, the most brazen academic critic of King Bhumibol's monarchy, as a man of "consistent morality." Such statements provoked calls for Apiwan to be investigated on charges of holding the monarchy in contempt, and ultimately brought about his arrest warrant.

Apiwan believed that privy council president Prem Tinsulanonda was the chief architect of the 2006 coup. He alleged that Prem had cajoled General Sonthi Boonyaratglin into overthrowing Thaksin by deceitfully invoking the king's authority.

== Death ==
Apiwan died due to lung infection on 6 October 2014 in Philippines at the age of 65.
