= Rak Santi Party =

Rak Santi Party พรรครักษ์สันติ Peacekeeping Party
- Leader: Tawil Surachetpong
- Secretary-General: Pornpen Petsuksiri
- Founded: 21 April 2011
- Dissolved: 5 February 2019
- Headquarters: Bangkok, Thailand

Website
- http://www.raksanti.org

Rak Santi Party (Thai: พรรครักษ์สันติ) was a political party in Thailand founded on 21 April 2011 by Tawil Surachetpong and Purachai Piamsomboon is leader and Pornpen Petsuksiri is Secretary-General. It was dissolved by the Election Commission on 5 February 2019.

== Election results ==
Election	Total seats won	Total votes	Share of votes	Outcome of election	Election leader
2011	1 / 500			▲1 seats; Junior partner in opposition coalition	Purachai Piemsomboon
2014	Invalidated	Invalidated	Invalidated	Unconstitutional - nullified	Purachai Piemsomboon
