= Niwatthamrong Boonsongpaisan =

Thai businessman and politician (born 1948)

Niwatthamrong Boonsongpaisan MPCh MWM
- นิวัฒน์ธำรง บุญทรงไพศาล
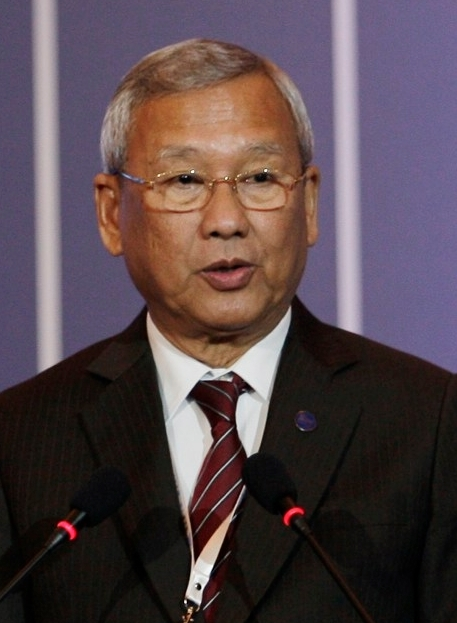
- Niwatthamrong at WTO Ministerial Conference in 2013

Acting Prime Minister of Thailand
- In office 7 May 2014 – 22 May 2014
- Monarch: Bhumibol Adulyadej
- Preceded by: Yingluck Shinawatra
- Succeeded by: Prayut Chan-o-cha

Deputy Prime Minister of Thailand
- In office 30 June 2013 – 22 May 2014
- Prime Minister: Yingluck Shinawatra; Himself (acting)

Minister of Commerce
- In office 30 June 2013 – 22 May 2014
- Prime Minister: Yingluck Shinawatra; Himself (acting)
- Preceded by: Boonsong Teriyapirom
- Succeeded by: Chatchai Sarikalya

Minister to the Office of the Prime Minister
- In office 18 January 2012 – 30 June 2013
- Prime Minister: Yingluck Shinawatra
- Preceded by: Kritsana Seehalak; Surawith Konsomboon
- Succeeded by: Santi Promphat

Member of the House of Representatives
- In office 3 July 2011 – 1 February 2012
- Constituency: Party-list

Personal details
- Born: 25 January 1948 (age 78) Bangkok, Thailand
- Party: People's Power (2007–2008); Pheu Thai (2008–present)
- Spouse: Boonphatcharee Boonsongpaisan
- Children: 2
- Education: Srinakharinwirot University; Chulalongkorn University

Niwatthamrong Boonsongpaisan (Thai: นิวัฒน์ธำรง บุญทรงไพศาล, RTGS: Niwatthamrong Bunsongphaisan, pronounced [ní.wát.tʰam.roŋ bun.soŋ.pʰaj.sǎːn]; born 25 January 1948) is a Thai businessman and politician who served as the acting Prime Minister of Thailand following Yingluck Shinawatra's removal from office by the Constitutional Court of Thailand on 7 May 2014 until his deposition in a coup d'état 15 days after taking office. Before becoming acting premier, he was Deputy Prime Minister and Minister of Commerce, and before that managed the country's rice pledging scheme.

== Early and personal life ==
Niwatthamrong was born on 25 January 1948. He holds a bachelor's degree in education from Srinakharinwirot University and a master's degree in computer science from Chulalongkorn University and is married to Boonphatcharee Boonsongpaisan.

== Business career ==
A close business associate of Thaksin Shinawatra, Niwatthamrong served as the Chairman of the Executive Committee-Media and Advertising front of Shin Corporation since 1995 and as vice-chairman since 2000. He served from 2001 to 2002 as vice-chairman of iTV and from 1993 to 1995, director of that company between 2002 and 2008, and a member of the board of directors between 2008 and 16 March 2010.

== Political career ==
Niwatthamrong served as director of the controversial rice pledging scheme, where rice was bought at inflated prices from farmers and subsequently was left to rot due to lack of buyers. On 30 June 2013 he was appointed Minister of Commerce and a deputy prime minister in the cabinet of Yingluck Shinawatra.

=== Acting Prime Minister ===
On 7 May 2014, Niwatthamrong became acting Prime Minister following the removal of Prime Minister Yingluck Shinawatra and several members of her cabinet from office. On 22 May 2014 he was himself removed from office following a military coup.

== Royal decorations ==
Niwatthamrong has received the following royal decorations in the Honours System of Thailand:

- Knight Grand Cordon (Special Class) of The Most Noble Order of the Crown of Thailand
- Knight Grand Cordon (Special Class) of the Most Exalted Order of the White Elephant
- Companion (Fourth Class) of The Most Admirable Order of the Direkgunabhorn
