= Anudith Nakornthap =

Thai politician

- อนุดิษฐ์ นาครทรรพ
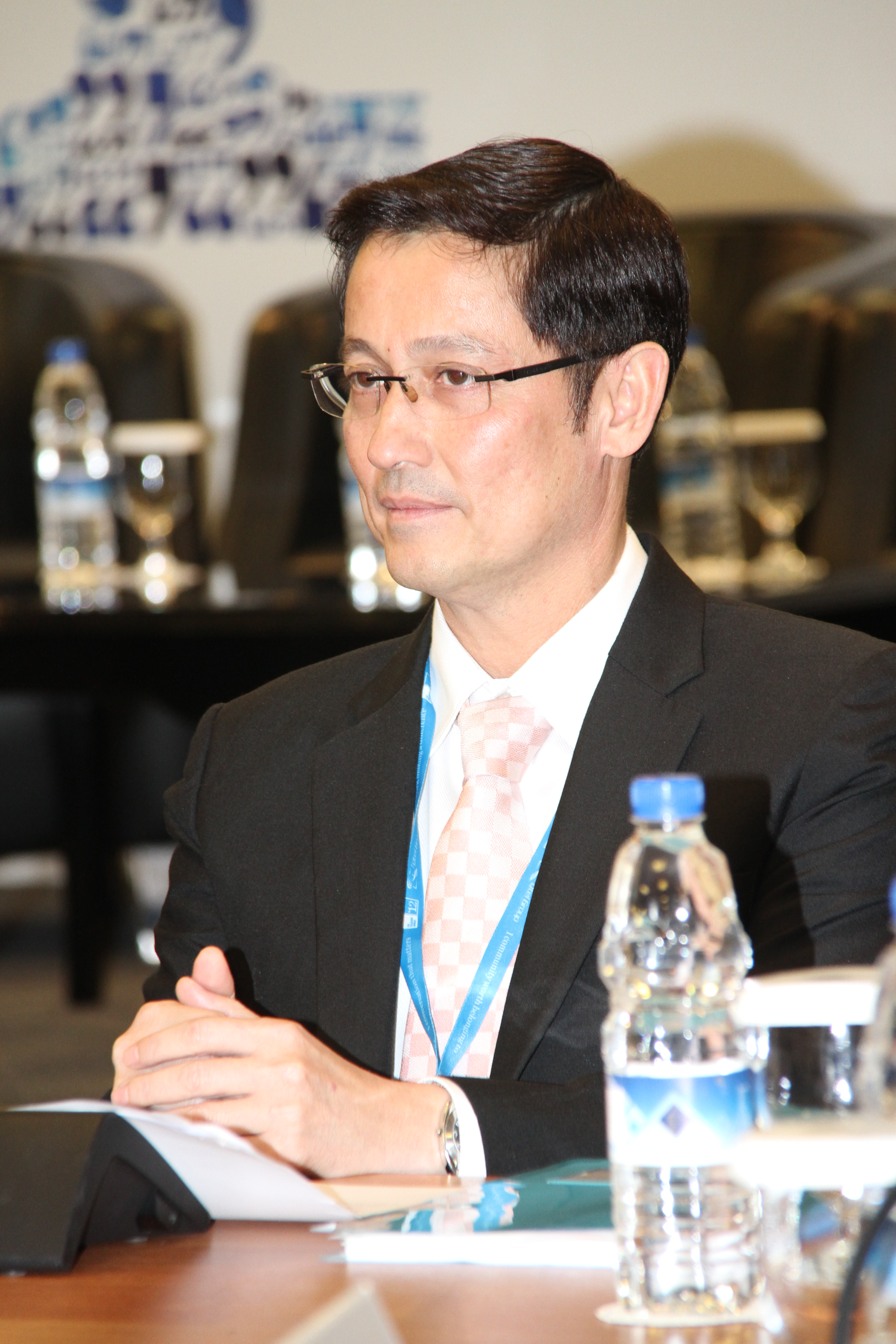
- Anudith at ITU Telecom World 2012

Minister of Information and Communication Technology
- In office 9 August 2011 – 7 May 2014
- Prime Minister: Yingluck Shinawatra
- Preceded by: Juti Krairiksh
- Succeeded by: Pornchai Rujiprapa

Deputy Leader of Thai Sang Thai Party
- Incumbent
- Assumed office 27 January 2023

Personal details
- Born: 7 April 1965 (age 61) Bangkok, Thailand
- Party: Thai Sang Thai Party
- Other political affiliations: Thai Rak Thai Party (2005-2007); People's Power Party (2007-2008); Pheu Thai Party (2008-2023)
- Spouse: Orawan Nakornthap
- Education: Royal Thai Air Force Academy; Sripatum University

Military service
- Branch/service: Royal Thai Air Force
- Rank: Group Captain

Anudith Nakornthap (Thai: อนุดิษฐ์ นาครทรรพ, RTGS: Anudit Nakhonthap; born 7 April 1965), is a politician for Pheu Thai Party and retired Thai Air Force officer. He was Thailand's Minister of Information and Communication Technology under Prime Minister Yingluck Shinawatra from August 2011 to May 2014.

== Early life and education ==
Anudith graduated from Kasetsart University Laboratory School (Class 7), then studied in Armed Forces Academies Preparatory School (Class 23), after which he got a bachelor of science degree in aerospace engineering from the Royal Thai Air Force Academy (Class 30). During his career in the Royal Thai Air Force he completed flight school (Class 82-30-2) in General Dynamics F-16 Fighting Falcon, squadron officer school (Class 76), Aerial Tactical Course (Class 5), Air Command and Staff College (Class 40), and Air Warfare Course (Class 4). He studied for a master's degree at Sripatum University. He further studied politics and governance at King Prajadhipok’s Institute (Class 12), Executives Program, Capital Market Academy (Class 14), Executives Program, Judicial Training Institute (Class 18), and Executives Program, Medical Governance (Class 3).

Anudith took office as Minister of Information and Communication Technology of Thailand on 9 August 2011. Although Anudith became well known as a politician in Thailand when he was elected as member of the House of Representatives from 2007 to 2011, his role in the parliament, began as early as in 2005 when he served as a political secretary for the Minister of Defense and advisor to the Minister of Agriculture and Cooperatives from 2005 to 2006. He was also involved in the energy sector while he was a member of the Committee on Energy of the House of Representatives in 2007-2011, during which he was appointed as Chairman of the Sub-Committee on Renewable Energy Promotion of the House of Representatives.

== Military posts ==
- Fighter squadron pilot Unit1032 (1992)
- Fighter squadron chief Unit1031 (1996)
- Chief of Ariel Operations Unit (1998)
- Staff officer, Cobra Gold Asia-Pacific Military Exercise, 1999
- 102 Fighter Squadron Leader, 2001 (The first squadron Leader when F-16s were operational in the RTAF)

=== Military rank ===
- Group Captain of The Royal Thai Air Force

== Educational and social achievements ==
- Distinguished Student Pilot Award, Royal Thai Air Force Flying Training School
- Top academic achievement, Royal Thai Air Force Flying Training School
- Certificate of Most Dedicated Student Officer Royal Thai Air Force, Squadron Officer School, Class 76
- Certificate of Outstanding Academic Achievement, Royal Thai Air Force, Squadron Officer School, Class 76
- Top Academic Achievement Cherdvudhakard, Royal Thai Air Force Air Command and Staff College, Class 40
- Outstanding Alumni Award on Public Administration and Management Ubol Ruangsuwan, Kasetsart University Laboratory School, 2005
- Outstanding Alumni, Royal Thai Air Force Academy, 2012
- Outstanding Alumni, Air Command and Staff College, 2012
- Honorary Chakdao for Outstanding Alumni in the field of Information and Communications Technology, Armed Forces Academies Preparatory School, 2012

== Political positions ==
- Political secretary for the Minister of Defense (2005–2006)
- Advisor to the Minister of Agriculture and Cooperatives (2005–2006)
- Chairman, Committee on Coordinating and Monitoring for Longan Policy, 2005, Ministry of Agriculture and Cooperatives (2005)
- Vice Chairman, Committee on Re-engineering the Office of Royal Rainmaking and Agricultural Aviation, Ministry of Agriculture and Cooperatives (2005)
- Vice Chairman, Committee on Acquisitions and Supports, the Office of Royal Rainmaking Operations, Ministry of Agriculture and Cooperatives (2005–2006)
- Vice Chairman, Sub-Committee on Anti-Drug Campaign in Northern Bangkok (2005)
- Sub-Committee on Considering and Following-up the Army Budget and Efficiency of Royal Thai Armed Forces, Committee on the Armed Forces (2005–2006)
- Advisor for Chairman of the Committee on Commerce and Intellectual Property, The House of Representatives
- Committee on Energy, The House of Representatives (2005–2006)
- Member of the House of Representatives (2007–2011 & 2011–2013)
- Minister of Information and Communication Technology (2011–2014)
- Secretary-General, Pheu Thai Party (2019–2020 )
