= Julapun Amornvivat =

Thai politician (born 1975)

- จุลพันธ์ อมรวิวัฒน์
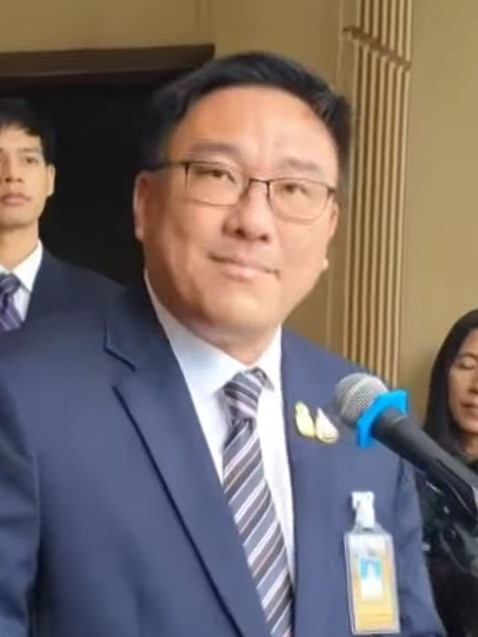
- Julapun in 2023

Minister of Labor
- Incumbent
- Assumed office 30 March 2026
- Prime Minister: Anutin Charnvirakul
- Preceded by: Trinuch Thienthong

Deputy Minister of Finance
- In office 1 September 2023 – 19 September 2025
- Prime Minister: Srettha Thavisin; Phumtham Wechayachai (acting); Paetongtarn Shinawatra; Suriya Juangroongruangkit (acting)

Leader of the Pheu Thai Party
- Incumbent
- Assumed office 31 October 2025
- Preceded by: Chusak Sirinil (acting); Paetongtarn Shinawatra

Member of the House of Representatives
- Incumbent
- Assumed office 8 February 2026
- Constituency: Party-list

Member of the House of Representatives for Chiang Mai province
- In office 6 February 2005 – 12 December 2025
- Preceded by: Yongyuth Suwaphap
- Succeeded by: Somchit Kanthaya

Personal details
- Born: 8 April 1975 (age 51) San Kamphaeng, Chiang Mai Province, Thailand
- Party: Pheu Thai (since 2008)
- Parent: Sompong Amornwiwat (father)

Julapun Amornvivat (Thai: จุลพันธ์ อมรวิวัฒน์, RTGS: Chulaphan Amonwiwat; born 8 April 1975) is a Thai politician who has served as the leader of the Pheu Thai Party since 2025. He has been a member of the House of Representatives since 2005. From 2023 to 2025, he served as deputy minister of finance. From 2021 to 2025, he served as deputy leader of the Pheu Thai Party. He is the son of Sompong Amornwiwat.

== Political career ==
Julapun was first elected to Parliament as a constituency MP for the Thai Rak Thai Party at the 2005 election, beating the incumbent MP, Yongyuth Suwapap, and thus flipping the only remaining seat in Chiang Mai held by the Democrat Party. On April 29, 2011, he took part in a protest organized by the United Front for Democracy Against Dictatorship (UDD) in Chiang Mai.

In 2019, Julapun won his fourth term as an MP, rising to the position of deputy leader of the Pheu Thai Party in 2021. Subsequently, he became Thailand's Deputy Minister of Finance in 2023 under Prime Minister Srettha Thavisin, taking on the responsibility of managing the government's ฿10,000 digital wallet scheme.

Julapun assumed the leadership of the Pheu Thai Party on October 31, 2025, and began serving as Minister of Labor in March 2026 as a member of Anutin Charnvirakul's cabinet.

Political offices
Preceded by Chusak Sirinil; Acting	Leader of Pheu Thai Party; 2025–present	Incumbent
