= Surawit Khonsomboon =

Thai politician (born 1949)

- สุรวิทย์ คนสมบูรณ์

Minister to the Office of the Prime Minister
- In office 9 August 2011 – 18 January 2012
- Prime Minister: Yingluck Shinawatra
- Preceded by: Sathit Wongnongtoey; Ong-arj Klampaiboon
- Succeeded by: Worawat Auapinyakul

Personal details
- Born: 24 April 1949 (age 77) Chaiyaphum, Thailand
- Party: Pheu Thai Party
- Education: Chiang Mai University (MD); Ramkhamhaeng University; University of London

Surawit Khonsomboon (Thai: สุรวิทย์ คนสมบูรณ์, RTGS: Surawit Khonsombun; born 23 April 1949) is a Thai politician and medical doctor. He is a former Member of Parliament representing the Pheu Thai Party. From its electoral victory in 2011 to January 2012 he was Minister in the Office of the Prime Minister in the cabinet of prime minister Yingluck Shinawatra, subsequently he served as Deputy Minister of Public Health until October 2012.

== Family life ==
Surawit was born in Chaiyaphum province on 23 April 1949. He is married to Parnthip Khonsomboon (Thai: ปานทิพย์ คนสมบูรณ์), a politician also representing the Pheu Thai Party. They have two sons and one daughter: Jarudet (Thai: จารุเดจ คนสมบูรณ์); Phawarat (Thai: ภวรัตน์ คนสมบูรณ์) and Thanawat (Thai: ธนวัฒน์ คนสมบูรณ์).

== Education ==
Surawit holds two bachelor's degrees from Chiang Mai University, one in Science and one in Medicine and graduated in 1971 and 1973 respectively. He then received a scholarship from the World Health Organization to study and carry out research in Eyes in Japan and India during 1979–1981. He then obtained another bachelor's degree in law from Ramkhamhaeng University in 1984. In 1987 he completed a diploma in Community Eye Health (DCEH) from the University of London.

Surawit completed a master's degree in public administration from The National Institute of Development Administration (NIDA) in 2001, and recently received an Honorary Doctorate of Arts from Chaiyaphum Rajabhat University in 2009.

== Career ==
Surawit started his career as a doctor in Chaiyaphum Hospital, specialising in EENT. During his 14 years as a doctor he was awarded Outstanding Rural Doctor of the Year (1982) from the Medical Association of Thailand. He is a founder of the Foundation of the Protection of the Eyes in Chaiyaphum province. He is also a board member and helped found The Foundation to Prevent Blindness: Ministry of Health.

== Political career ==
Surawit first entered politics as an MP with the New Aspiration Party in 1992. He won eight consecutive elections included the most recent general election held in July 2011.

His past political appointments include being Assistant Secretary to the Minister of Finance in 1992 and Assistant Secretary to the Minister of Agriculture in 1995. A year later, he held the position of Secretary of the Minister in the Office of the Prime Minister, together with the position of Deputy Secretary of the prime minister. He went on to serve in the same position as Deputy Secretary of prime minister once again in 2005. He is currently a Secretary of the board of directors of MP in the North Eastern Region of Pheu Thai Party. After the Pheu Thai Party's victory in the July 2011 general election, he was appointed as Minister for Office of the Prime Minister in the government of Yingluck Shinawatra on 9 August 2011. In a major cabinet reshuffle on 18 January 2012, he was reassigned to Deputy Minister of Public Health. He lost that post during another reshuffle on 28 October of the same year.
