= 2014 Thai general election =

- 2 February 2014
- All 500 seats in the House of Representatives; 251 seats needed for a majority
- Turnout: 47.72% (▼27.31pp)
Prime Minister before	Prime Minister after
Yingluck Shinawatra; Pheu Thai	Election results annulled Prayut Chan-o-cha (NCPO) became Prime Minister

Early general elections were held in Thailand on 2 February 2014 after Prime Minister Yingluck Shinawatra requested King Bhumibol Adulyadej for the dissolution of parliament more than a year early owing to Thailand's political crisis. Voters elected a new House of Representatives, the lower house of the National Assembly. However, voting was disrupted in 69 of 375 constituencies by the political opposition that had called for a boycott. This made a voting re-run in several constituencies necessary, depending on the security situation in the affected districts and the first voting re-run date was set for 2 March. Results were expected to be announced after voting had taken place in all parts of the country. On 21 March 2014, the Constitutional Court invalidated the elections on grounds that they were not completed within one day throughout the country.

== Background ==
After the ruling Pheu Thai Party attempted to pass an amnesty bill, the opposition accused them of seeking to bring back former Prime Minister Thaksin Shinawatra, who is in self-imposed exile following his conviction for abuse of power. Protests then occurred, sometimes violent, which included demands for the government to resign and the Shinawatra family to quit Thai politics. Following a mass resignation of opposition MPs, on 9 December Yingluck said in a televised address that she had asked the King to dissolve parliament in order to allow the Thai people to resolve the crisis. She said: "At this stage, when there are many people opposed to the government from many groups, the best way is to give back the power to the Thai people and hold an election, so the Thai people will decide." However, anti-government protest leader Suthep Thaugsuban said that the protests would continue till their demands are met, including the formation of an unelected "people's council", as "we have not yet reached our goal. The dissolving of parliament is not our aim." Yingluck also said that she would not resign ahead of the election.

== Organization and changes ==
According to the Election Commission, the organization of this election cost 3.8 billion baht, while the previous election in 2011 cost 3.4 billion baht. The rise of the expenses is due to the increase of the constituencies from 95,000 to 100,000. The Election Commission also said that there were 48 million eligible voters.

== Anti-election campaigns ==
The opposition party, Democrat Party, decided to boycott the election. In response, Yingluck said the election would go ahead as planned.

On 26 December the Election Commission held a session at the Thai-Japanese Stadium in Bangkok in which parties participating in the election were allocated their positions on the ballot papers for the national election of members from party lists. A crowd of "several thousand" protesters from a group called Network of Students and People for Reform of Thailand attempted to disrupt the registration process by forcing their way into the stadium. A truck was driven at the gates in an attempt to break them down. Police responded with tear gas, rubber bullets and water cannon. The violence escalated with firearms being used on both sides. A police Sergeant-Major was shot in the chest and died in hospital. A protester was wounded and later died in hospital. Despite this attempt at disruption, the registration of candidates went ahead, although Election Commission staff had to be evacuated by helicopter when the process was concluded.

Following these events, the president of the Election Commission, Supachai Somcharoen, called for the election to be postponed. "It is not hard to predict that the election will not be smooth, fair and transparent under the current circumstances." In response, Deputy Prime Minister Phongthep Thepkanchana said: "There is no clause in the charter or any other law which authorizes the government to postpone the election date." The Bangkok Post suggested that the Election Commissioners might resign if the government did not postpone the election, or they might postpone it on their own authority, despite lacking legal authority to do so.

In southern Thailand demonstrators prevented candidate registration in 28 constituencies for four successive days. By 31 December, no candidate registrations had taken place in the six southern provinces of Chumpon, Krabi, Phattalung, Songkhla, Surat Thani and Trang. Registration was also partly prevented in Nakhon Si Thammarat and Phuket provinces. All these areas are strongholds of the Democrat Party. Under the Thai Constitution, the House of Representatives cannot sit unless the Election Commission has certified the election of a member for at least 95% of the 375 constituencies. If no candidates are registered for the southern provinces, this requirement will not be met and the new House of Representatives will be unable to meet. The Pheu Thai Party has requested the Election Commission to extend the deadline for candidate registration. The Asian Wall Street Journal suggested that the opposition was "openly begging for another military coup." On 7 January, the National Anti-Corruption Commission (NACC) announced that it would charge 308 members of the outgoing House of Representatives and Senate with "misconduct." The basis of the charge is that these members voted for legislation to change the Senate from a partly elected to a fully elected chamber. The Constitutional Court ruled that this legislation violated section 68 of the 2007 Constitution. Section 68 prohibits an attempt to undermine the "democratic regime of government with the King as Head of State" or to acquire the administrative power by constitutional means, and empowers the Constitutional Court to stop such attempt, to dissolve any political party guilty of it and to disfranchise the executives of the dissolved party for five years. The NACC claimed that since the legislation was found to be unconstitutional, those who voted for it were guilty of misconduct.

== Constitutional Court case ==
Due to violence and obstruction from the protests, the Election Commission said on 11 January that it would either order the adjournment of the election or would request the government to do so. Supachai Somcharoen said the reason for doing so was the EC's failure to register candidates in the 28 southern constituencies. He also suggested that in the 22 constituencies in which only one candidate had registered, voter turnout might not reach the required minimum of 20%. He added that he feared further political violence. However, Prime Minister Yingluck argued that neither the government nor the commission is empowered to cancel or adjourn an election. Deputy Prime Minister Thepkanchana added that if the government adjourned the election, for any reason, beyond the 60-day legal timeframe, it could be taken to court for violating the constitution.

On 23 January, the Commission requested the Constitutional Court to decide if an election can be adjourned and who is the competent authority to do so. The court unanimously agreed to address the case. On 24 January, the court, by seven votes to one, ruled that the government and the election commission could jointly postpone the election. The government then offered to postpone the election with the caveat that there would be an agreement by all parties that the rescheduled election date would not be disrupted or boycotted.

On 28 January the Election Commission held a joint conference with the Council of Ministers and offered to delay the election for three or four months, but that if the government insisted that the election take place as originally scheduled, the commission would seek assistance from the armed forces to ensure peace and order during the election. After the conference, the Commission stated that the election would take place as scheduled because most parts of the country were unhindered by disruption and the delay did not guarantee that unrest would cease. Deputy Prime Minister Surapong Tovichakchaikul accused the Commission of "playing tricks" to bring about a postponement of the election.

== Early voting ==
Early voting for those unable to vote on 2 February began on 26 January. There are an estimated 2 million registered early voters. In the southern provinces and in parts of Bangkok, demonstrators blocked access to polling places and prevented early voting from taking place. There were violent altercations at some polling places between demonstrators and people wishing to vote. One protest leader, Suthin Tharatin, was shot dead at a polling place in Bangkok during a confrontation with voters. Early voting took place without incident in the north, north-eastern and central regions (outside Bangkok) of Thailand. "This is the day when Thailand and the rest of the world saw the true face of the protest movement," said Sunai Phasuk of Human Rights Watch. "They are using thuggery to disrupt the voting process."

== Election day ==
The day before the election there were reports of gunfights between supporters and opponents of the government in Lak Si District, in the northern suburbs of Bangkok. On 2 February, however, the election went ahead as scheduled, with no reports of violence. Voting was unable to take place in the south and in parts of Bangkok, however Prime Minister Yingluck was able to vote at a Bangkok polling place. Security officials said about 130,000 police had been deployed across Thailand, including 12,000 in Bangkok. "The situation overall is calm and we haven't received any reports of violence this morning," said National Security Council chief Paradorn Pattanatabutr. The EC said that voting had been unable to proceed in 42 constituencies in the south and in Bangkok.

Counting of votes began immediately after the close of polling, but the EC said it would not be announcing results because of "problems," including the blocking of advance voting and the failure to hold voting in some constituencies. EC Chairman Supachai Somcharoen stated on Thai television: "Today, we cannot announce the overall results of the election”.

According to the EC, the final turnout for the 2 February elections—counted from 68 provinces and excluding the nine provinces where voting was cancelled—was 47.72 per cent, or 20,530,359 voters (voting was closed prior to the 3 p.m. cut-off time in some areas of these provinces). The highest participation rate was in Chiang Mai, where 827,808 voters, or 75.05 per cent, participated from a total 1,103,069 eligible voters. Of the total ballots cast in Chiang Mai, 530,427, or 64.08 per cent, were valid; 129,983, or 15.7 per cent, were invalid; and 167,398, or 20.22 per cent, were vote-no ballot. For Bangkok Metropolis, a total of 1,133,296 voters, or 25.94 per cent, from a total of 4,369,120 eligible voters cast their votes—775,821, or 68.46 per cent, were valid; 90,923, or 8.02 per cent, were invalid; and 266,552, or 23.52 per cent, were vote-no ballots. The EC announced that as many as 20.1 million out of 43.024 million eligible voters submitted votes in 68 provinces where voting was not disrupted by protestors, with 71.38 percent of those ballots valid, 12.05 percent invalid and 16.57 percent "no-vote". The EC will discuss the 28 constituencies where candidates were prevented from registering prior to the polls due to protest actions and stated that it will consult with legal experts and advisors before arriving at a decision.

On 4 February 2014, the Democrat Party forwarded a request to the Constitutional Court to invalidate the election, in addition to the dissolution of the Pheu Thai Party and the disfranchisement of its executives. As part of their request, the Democrats identified the election an attempt of the government to acquire administrative power by unconstitutional means, in accordance with section 68 of the Constitution, the same section that the Democrats had successfully invoked to request the invalidation of the constitutional amendment in November 2013. Section 68 prohibits an attempt to undermine the "democratic regime of government with the King as Head of State", or to acquire administrative power by constitutional means, and empowers the Constitutional Court to stop such an attempt, to dissolve any political party guilty of it and to disfranchise the executives of the dissolved party for five years. The Pheu Thai Party filed a counter-request in response to the Democrat Party on 5 February, also seeking the dissolution and disfranchisement of its executives on the grounds of section 68. The Pheu Thai Party spokesperson said that the Democrat Party's request to invalidate the election is an attempt to topple the government outside the rule of democracy.

== Re-run in disrupted constituencies ==
A six-hour meeting was convened by the EC on 7 February and EC member Somchai explained afterwards that if elections are to be held in the 28 constituencies in which candidate have not been able to register for polls, a written royal decree from the government is necessary. The meeting unanimously decided to seek such a decree from the government and the EC believes that it can hold new elections in the five provinces of Rayong, Yala, Pattani, Narathiwat and Petchaburi without difficulty. However, Somchai stated: “We are not quite sure if new elections could be successfully held in Prachuap Khiri Khan and Satun which have 222 and 300 polling stations, respectively.", but added that the EC would reassess the situation again on 11 February 2014. EC secretary general Puchong Nutrawong said the EC has scheduled candidacy registration for 4–8 March, 23 March for advance election and 30 March for Senate election.
