= Charupong Ruangsuwan =

Thai civil servant and politician

- จารุพงศ์ เรืองสุวรรณ
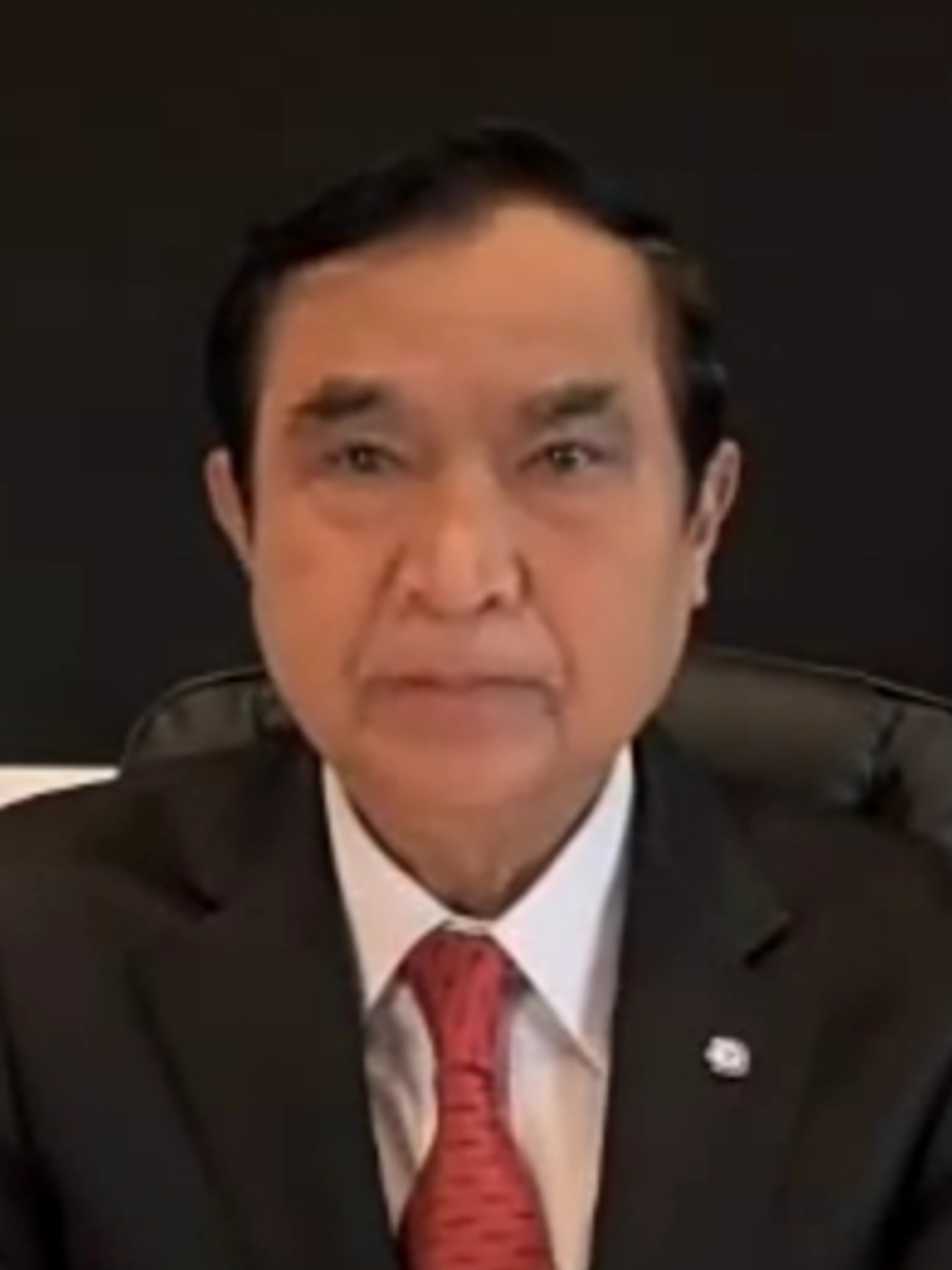
- Charupong Ruangsuwan in 2015

Minister of Interior
- In office 28 October 2012 – 22 May 2014
- Prime Minister: Yingluck Shinawatra
- Preceded by: Yongyuth Wichaidit
- Succeeded by: Anupong Paochinda

Minister of Transport
- In office 18 January 2012 – 28 October 2012
- Prime Minister: Yingluck Shinawatra
- Preceded by: Sukampol Suwannathat
- Succeeded by: Chadchart Sittipunt

Leader of the Pheu Thai Party
- In office 30 October 2012 – 16 June 2014
- Preceded by: Yongyuth Wichaidit
- Succeeded by: Viroj Pao-in

Personal details
- Born: August 15, 1946 (age 80) Bangkok, Siam
- Party: Pheu Thai Party
- Spouse: Suphadtra Ruangsuwan
- Education: Thammasat University; Chulalongkorn University
- Profession: Politician

Military service
- Allegiance: Thailand
- Branch/service: Volunteer Defense Corps
- Rank: VDC Gen. (Honour rank)

Charupong Ruangsuwan (Thai: จารุพงศ์ เรืองสุวรรณ, RTGS: Charuphong Rueangsuwan, first name also transcribed as 'Jarupong'; born 15 August 1946) is a Thai civil servant and politician. Since October 2012 he has been the chairman of the Pheu Thai Party. From January to October 2012, he was the Minister of Transport and Communication, from October 2012 until the military coup d'état in May 2014 the Minister of Interior of Thailand.

== Personal life ==
Charupong's father was the politician Charubutr Ruangsuwan, who served as President of the National Assembly in the 1980s and Member of Parliament representing Khon Kaen Province for six terms (he was also a Seri Thai fighter during World War II, and a scholar of Isan, i.e. Northeastern Thai, culture).

== Education ==
Charupong has graduated from Amnuay Silpa School, and holds a Bachelor of Law from Thammasat University and a Master of Public Administration from Chulalongkorn University. Moreover, he completed a course at the National Defence College of Thailand.

== Career ==
He became an officer of the Department of Provincial Administration, serving as Chief district officer of several districts (amphoe) in Northeastern and Central Thailand. He later changed to the Bangkok Metropolitan Administration (BMA), successively serving as director of Bang Khen district, deputy director of the cleansing department, assistant to the permanent secretary for the BMA, director of the community development department, director of the education department, and deputy permanent secretary for the BMA. In 2002, he returned to the state administration, successively serving as deputy permanent secretary in the Ministry of Social Development and Human Security, permanent secretary in the Ministry of Labour, and permanent secretary in the Ministry of Justice. Coevally, he was the Chairman of the Board of Directors of Bangkok Mass Transit Authority starting from 2003. From 2006 to 2010, he was the rector of Southeast Asia University.

Charupong was a member of the People's Power Party, and after its dissolution by the Constitutional Court in 2008 became a member of Pheu Thai Party. In May 2011, the party chose him as secretary-general. Two months later, Pheu Thai won the general election. After Prime Minister Yingluck Shinawatra's first cabinet reshuffle, Charupong was appointed Minister of Transport and Communication. When Pheu Thai Party chairman and Minister of Interior Yongyuth Wichaidit had to resign over a corruption scandal in September 2012, Charupong succeeded him in both positions. The government, that acted only in caretaker capacity after dissolving the House of Representatives in December 2013, was toppled by a military coup on 22 May 2014. The junta ordered all cabinet members to report to their headquarters, but unlike other politicians Charupong refused to turn himself in. He claims to have taken shelter at an unspecified place in Northeastern Thailand. As a consequence, the National Council for Peace and Order blocked his bank accounts and assets.

On 24 June 2014, Charupong announced the formation of the Organisation of Free Thais for Human Rights and Democracy (OFHD), seeking to restore Thai popular sovereignty in the face of the 2014 Thai coup d'état. The date chosen is the 82nd anniversary of the Siamese Revolution of 1932. The organisation's name recalls the Thai underground resistance movement against Imperial Japan during World War II known as the Free Thai Movement (Thai: เสรีไทย, Seri Thai).

On 24 June 2015, Charupong, acting as Secretary-General of OFHD, in a video uploaded on YouTube warned Thais of the risk Thailand turning into a failed state and detailed three goals of OFHD: (1) abolition of the Privy Council, (2) depoliticization/democratization/normalization of the Thai Army, and (3) depoliticization of the Thai judiciary.
