= Yongyuth Wichaidit =

Thai politician (born 1942)

Yongyuth Wichaidit MPCh MWM
- ยงยุทธ วิชัยดิษฐ

Deputy Prime Minister of Thailand
- In office 9 August 2011 – 30 September 2012
- Prime Minister: Yingluck Shinawatra

Minister of Interior
- In office 9 August 2011 – 30 September 2012
- Prime Minister: Yingluck Shinawatra
- Preceded by: Chaovarat Chanweerakul
- Succeeded by: Charupong Ruangsuwan

Leader of Pheu Thai Party
- In office 7 December 2008 – 3 October 2012
- Preceded by: Suchart Thada-Thamrongvech
- Succeeded by: Charupong Ruangsuwan

Personal details
- Born: July 15, 1942 (age 84) Surat Thani, Thailand
- Party: Pheu Thai
- Education: Chulalongkorn University; NIDA
- Profession: Politician; civil servant

Yongyuth Wichaidit (Thai: ยงยุทธ วิชัยดิษฐ, RTGS: Yongyut Wichaidit; born July 15, 1942, in Surat Thani) is a Thai politician (Pheu Thai Party). He is the younger brother of Democrat politician Thawat Wichaidit.

== Early life and education ==
Yongyuth holds a bachelor's degree in Political science of Chulalongkorn University and a master's degree of National Institute of Development Administration (NIDA).

== Careers ==
Yongyuth was high-rank public servant, served as Permanent Secretary of Ministry of Interior, director-general of the Department of Lands, chairman of the Metropolitan Electricity Authority and chairman of the Audit Committee of the Government Lottery Office.

== Political careers ==
His political functions include assistant minister to Sudarat Keyuraphan, TRT-Health Minister under Prime Minister Thaksin Shinawatra (2003–05) and advisor to Minister of Interior Kowit Wattana in Somchai Wongsawat's PPP-led government (2008), Deputy Prime Minister and Minister of Interior in the government of Yingluck Shinawatra.

On 7 December 2008, Yongyuth Wichaidit was elected to leader of Pheu Thai (For Thai) Party, the main governing party and successor to the dissolved People's Power Party, which is close to ousted former Prime Minister Thaksin. He followed interim leader Suchart Thadathamrongwet in office. On 9 September 2010, Yongyuth announced to resign from the post to clear place for Kowit Wattana, but the voting party members asked him to carry on the leadership.

After his Pheu Thai Party won 2011 general election, he was appointed Deputy Prime Minister and Minister of Interior in the government of Yingluck Shinawatra on 9 August 2011 and resigned on 28 September 2012. His resignation is effective on 1 October 2012. He also resigned from MP and Pheu Thai Party's leader on 4 October 2012. Prior to resignations he was accused of illegal land sale endorsements and later was found guilty by the National Anti-Corruption Commission of misfeasance. According to the Bangkok Post, the Prime Minister of Thailand asked him to resign.

== Royal Decoration ==
- Knight Grand Cordon (Special Class) of the Most Exalted Order of the White Elephant
- Knight Grand Cordon (Special Class) of the Most Noble Order of the Crown of Thailand
