= Ministry of Labour (Thailand) =

Government ministry of Thailand

- กระทรวงแรงงาน
- Seal of three devas: left with scroll (employer), center with sword (government), right with plumb and hoe (employee)

- Flag of three devas: left with scroll (employer), center with sword (government), right with plumb and hoe (employee)

Ministry overview
- Formed: 23 September 1993; 32 years ago
- Jurisdiction: Government of Thailand
- Headquarters: Din Daeng, Bangkok
- Annual budget: 52,594 million baht (FY2019)
- Minister responsible: Julapun Amornvivat, Minister
- Ministry executive: Boonsong Thapchaiyuth, Permanent Secretary
- Website: mol.go.th

The Ministry of Labour (Abrv: MOL; Thai: กระทรวงแรงงาน, RTGS: Krasuang Raengngan) is a Thai government body responsible for overseeing labour administration and protection, skill development, and the promotion of employment in Thailand. The ministry was founded in 1993 as the "Ministry of Labour and Social Services", then later renamed "Ministry of Labour" in 2002.

== Organisation and budget ==
Article 35 of the Act on Reorganization of Ministries, Ministerial Bureaus, and Departments, B.E.2545 (2002), established the following MOL structure:

1. Office of the Minister
2. Office of the Permanent Secretary
3. Department of Employment
4. Department of Skill Development
5. Department of Labour Protection and Welfare (DLPW)
6. Social Security Office

For FY2019, the ministry's budget is 52,594 million baht.

== See also ==
- Thai labour law
