= Surapong Tovichakchaikul =

Thai politician (1953–2020)

Surapong Tovichakchaikul MPCh MWM
- สุรพงษ์ โตวิจักษณ์ชัยกุล
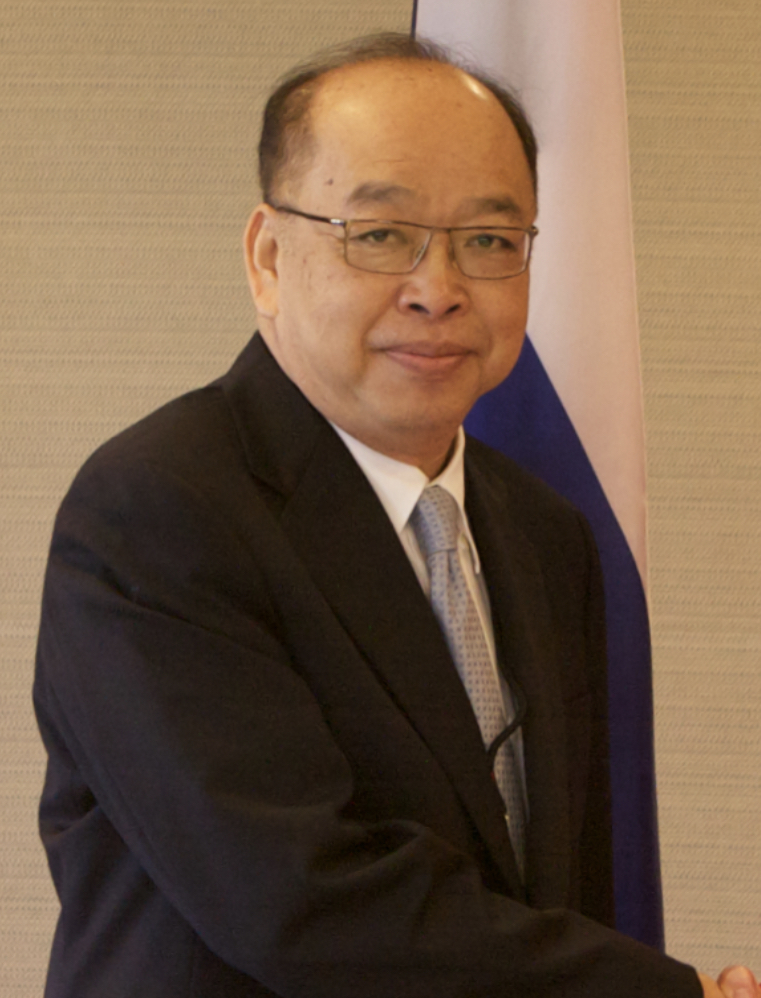
- Surapong Tovichakchaikul in 2011

Deputy Prime Minister of Thailand
- In office 28 October 2012 – 7 May 2014
- Prime Minister: Yingluck Shinawatra

Minister of Foreign Affairs
- In office 9 August 2011 – 7 May 2014
- Prime Minister: Yingluck Shinawatra
- Preceded by: Kasit Piromya
- Succeeded by: Thanasak Patimaprakorn

Personal details
- Born: 1 May 1953 Chiang Mai, Thailand
- Died: 20 May 2020 (aged 67) Bangkok, Thailand
- Party: Pheu Thai Party
- Spouse: Anchalee Tovichakchaikul (div.)
- Relations: Thaksin Shinawatra (cousin in-law)
- Children: Nuttapong Tovichakchaikul; Supisara Tovichakchaikul
- Education: Khon Kaen University; Youngstown State University; University of Akron (Ph.D.)
- Profession: Politician; engineer
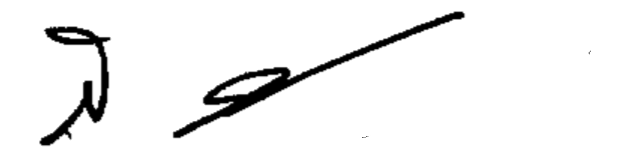
- Signature

Surapong Tovichakchaikul (Thai: สุรพงษ์ โตวิจักษณ์ชัยกุล, RTGS: Suraphong Towichakchaikun; 1 May 1953 – 20 May 2020) was a Thai politician who served as Deputy Prime Minister and Minister of Foreign Affairs of Thailand from 2011 to 2014. He used to be party-list MP and Pheu Thai Party deputy leader.

== Early life ==
Surapong Tovichakchaikul was born on 1 May 1953 at Chiang Mai Province. He was Thaksin Shinwatra's cousin in-law because Sumalee Tovichakchaikul (Surapong's aunt) was married to Satien Shinawatra, Thaksin's uncle. Surapong has 2 children. He earned a Bachelor of Engineering from Khon Kaen University.

== Entry into politics ==
Surapong entered politics when he was elected as the MP for Chiang Mai Province on behalf of the Democrat Party in the 1996 general election. He was also elected Democrat Party executive. In the 2001 general election, he was an MP candidate for the same party but lost to Pakorn Buranupakorn from Thai Rak Thai Party. In 2005 general election, he was a 41st party-list MP candidate for Democrat Party but was not elected. When he was a Democrat Party member, Surapong played an important role in criticizing Thaksin Shinawatra.

Later, Surapong moved to join the Thai Rak Thai Party in 2006. After the 2006 coup d'état the Thai Rak Thai Party was dissolved and he and most of the former Thai Rak Thai Party members joined the People's Power Party. He was elected as MP for Chiang Mai Province again in the 2007 general election on behalf of the People's Power Party under the leadership of Samak Sundaravej.

In 2009, Surapong was among United Front for Democracy Against Dictatorship supporters who signed petition for Thaksin's amnesty. Later, Surapong joined the Pheu Thai Party and was appointed deputy leader of the party in September 2010. In the 2011 general election, he was elected as 20th party-list MP for Pheu Thai Party and was appointed Minister of Foreign Affairs in Yingluck Shinawatra's government. Later, Surapong was also appointed as Deputy Prime Minister. The Yingluck government was ousted in a coup d'état on 22 May 2014.

== Death ==
Surapong died on 20 May 2020 of liver cancer at Siriraj Hospital. He was 67.

== Royal decorations ==
Surapong received the following royal decorations in the Honours System of Thailand:

- Knight Grand Cordon (Special Class) of The Most Noble Order of the Crown of Thailand
- Knight Grand Cordon (Special Class) of the Most Exalted Order of the White Elephant
