= Pheu Thai Party =

Thai political party

Pheu Thai Party พรรคเพื่อไทย
- Abbreviation: PTP (common); PT (official)
- Leader: Julapun Amornvivat
- Secretary-General: Prasert Jantararuangtong
- Spokesperson: Suksit Srichomkwan
- Head of the Family: Paetongtarn Shinawatra
- Founder: Thaksin Shinawatra
- Founded: 20 September 2007; 19 years ago
- Preceded by: People's Power Party (de facto)
- Headquarters: 197 BBD building, Vibhavadi Rangsit Road, Sam Sen Nai subdistrict, Phaya Thai district, Bangkok
- Think tank: CARE; Pheu Thai Academy
- Youth wing: Pheu Thai Institute of Youth
- Membership (2024): 31,734
- Ideology: Liberal conservatism; Economic liberalism; Thaksinomics; Populism
- Political position: Centre-right
- Colours: Red and Blue
- Slogan: หัวใจคือประชาชน (The people are our heart.)
- House of Representatives: 74 / 500
- Bangkok Metropolitan Council (including party affiliates): 4 / 50
- PAO Chief Executives (including party affiliates): 26 / 76

Party flag

Website
- ptp.or.th

The Pheu Thai Party (PTP or PT; /ˌpʌˈtaɪ/ PUH TY; Thai: พรรคเพื่อไทย, RTGS: Phak Phuea Thai [pʰák.pʰɯ̂a.tʰāj], lit. 'For Thais Party') is a major populist, liberal conservative political party in Thailand. It is the third incarnation of the Thai Rak Thai Party, a political party founded by former prime minister Thaksin Shinawatra in 1998. Like the previous incarnations, Pheu Thai is the main political vehicle for the Shinawatra family. It is currently the third largest party in the House of Representatives and has been in government as a junior partner in the ruling coalition since 2026.

The Pheu Thai Party was founded on 20 September 2007, as an anticipated replacement for the People's Power Party (PPP), which the Constitutional Court of Thailand dissolved less than three months later after finding party members guilty of electoral fraud. The People's Power Party was itself a replacement for Thaksin's original Thai Rak Thai Party (TRT), dissolved by the Court in May 2007 for violation of electoral laws.

As of 2023, the PTP has 66,833 members. The party is currently led by Julapun Amornvivat. The party tends to be more popular in the north and northeast of the country.

== History ==
=== Formation and opposition (2008–2011) ===
The PPP was dissolved by the Constitutional Court of Thailand on 2 December 2008. On 3 December 2008, the majority of the former PPP MPs defected to the Pheu Thai Party. In a PTP general assembly, the first executive commission was elected on 7 December 2008. Candidates for the party's leader were: Yongyuth Wichaidit, Apiwan Wiriyachai, former Vice President of the House of Representatives, former health minister Chalerm Yubamrung and former industry minister Mingkwan Saengsuwan. Yongyuth Wichaidit was elected as the party's leader.

In a December 2008 parliamentary session, MPs of five PPP coalition parties decided to endorse Abhisit Vejjajiva as the next prime minister and themselves forming a Democrat-led coalition. The PTP campaigned for their endorsement by the PPP-coalition parties. However, Abhisit had gained their support for the premiership. After that, the party called for a national unity government in which all parties would be involved, with Sanoh Thienthong of the Pracharaj Party as the new premier. This proposal was rejected by the defecting coalition parties and the Democrat Party. On 11 December, Worrawat Eua-apinyakul, then MP for Phrae from PTP, suggested that the party should push for a house dissolution and general elections, with the hope of depriving the prospective coalition of a parliamentary majority. However, The President of the House of Representatives; Chai Chidchob spoke against the plan.

On 15 December 2008, the party elected Pracha Promnok as the party's candidate for prime minister and has since been in opposition to prime minister Abhisit Vejjajiva's coalition government. As an opposition, the party received a rating of 3.75 out of 10 by a majority of respondents in a nationwide survey conducted on 24 and 25 December 2010, by Bangkok University.

In early May 2011, Charupong Ruangsuwan was named the new Secretary General of the party. Following the discovery of illegal timber by Thai authorities, during an August 2014 search at Charupong's son's Mae Hong Son Province resort for buried war weapons and other illegal items, the media reported that both Charupong and his son were no longer present in Thailand.

=== In government (2011–2014) ===
In the 2011 general election, the Pheu Thai Party contested for the first time since its foundation. On 16 May, Thaksin's youngest sister Yingluck Shinawatra was nominated head of PTP's party-list proportional representation and contender of prime minister Abhisit. One of her main issues in the campaign was national reconciliation. The election was expected to be a neck-and-neck contest between Pheu Thai and the ruling Democrats. Unexpectedly, the party won 265 of 500 seats in the House of Representatives on 3 July. Prime Minister Abhisit Vejjajiva acknowledged Pheu Thai's success in the election, and congratulated Yingluck Shinawatra as Thailand's first female prime minister. Despite its absolute majority, the winning party announced that it would form a coalition government with five minor parties. On 5 August, Yingluck was elected prime minister with 296 votes in favour. The election was approved, and Yingluck was formally appointed by the king on 8 August.

=== 2023 general election and Srettha government (2023–2024) ===
During the 2023 Thai general election, Pheu Thai repeated its position that it would not form a coalition with either Palang Pracharat and United Thai Nation due to their involvement in the 2014 coup. Following the 2023 election, the Move Forward party leader and candidate, Pita Limjaoenrat, was denied the position of Prime Minister by Parliament. The coalition was then dissolved and replaced by a Pheu Thai led coalition without Move Forward.

On 7 August, they formed a new coalition to include Bhumjaithai, which won the third largest amount of MPs in the election and on 10 August, the Chart Pattana Kla party joined the coalition with 2 MPs.

On 12 August, Pheu Thai unofficially expanded its coalition again to include the pro-junta parties of Palang Pracharat and United Thai Nation, which both participated or supported the 2014 coup that ousted Pheu Thai prime minister Yingluck Shinawatra, increasing the amount of MPs in the coalition to 315 out of the 500 MPs in Parliament. The move was widely criticized as it broke their election promise to not work with parties linked to the junta.

The coalition contained in order of most MPs: Pheu Thai at 141 MPs, Bhumjaithai at 71, Palang Pracharat at 40, United Thai Nation at 36, Chart Pattana Kla at 2; with Thai Liberal, New Democracy, Plung Sungkom Mai and Thongtee Thai all having one. On 22 August 2023, its candidate Srettha Thavisin was elected 30th Prime Minister after gaining enough votes from Parliament.

In May 2024, 40 military-appointed senators submitted a case accepted by the Constitutional Court requesting the removal of Srettha and Pichit Chuenban under Section 170 (4) and (5) of the Constitution, which concerns the ethics of cabinet ministers. The case was in response to Srettha's appointment of Pichit, who had previously served time in jail for attempting to bribe Supreme Court officials, as a minister of the Prime Minister's Office.

Pichit resigned on 21 May. On 14 August, the constitutional court dismissed Srettha for gross ethics violations. Srettha is the fourth Thai premier in 16 years to be removed by the courts. Srettha expressed surprise over the decision, but said that he would "respect" it.

=== Paetongtarn government (2024–2025) and 2025 political crisis ===
Following the removal of Srettha as prime minister by the Constitutional Court of Thailand on 14 August 2024, Paetongtarn Shinawatra was nominated by Pheu Thai to succeed him. Her nomination was approved by the House of Representatives on 16 August after no alternatives were named by the other parties in the ruling coalition, making her the youngest person and the second woman to become Prime Minister of Thailand. Her premiership was plagued by the return Thaksin, including a vote of no-confidence by the opposition, alleging that she has allowed her father to control the Thai government and does not have her own autonomy to run the country – Paetongtarn survived this and remained in position.

In 2025, tensions on disputed areas of the Cambodian–Thai border escalated to clashes, the political fallout from which would lead to the fall of the Paetongtarn cabinet. A phone call between Paetongtarn and Hun Sen, former prime minister of Cambodia and longtime friend of Thaksin, in which she referred to him as "uncle" and referred to a Thai military commander as part of the "opposing side" was leaked by Hun Sen. These remarks drew widespread condemnation in Thailand, leading to petitions for Paetongtarn's dismissal, and was cited by the Bhumjaithai Party as a reason for withdrawing from her cabinet, precipitating the 2025 Thai political crisis. Paetongtarn would be suspended by the Constitutional Court in July, and removed in August. In the ensuing competition to form a new government, the People's Party, a successor of the Move Forward Party, acted as kingmaker and backed Bhumjaithai over Pheu Thai in a confidence and supply deal, returning Pheu Thai to the opposition.

== Political ideology ==
Similar to its predecessors, the Pheu Thai Party is a populist political party that tends to be more popular among subsistence farmers and the rural working class mostly found in the northern and northeastern regions of Thailand. Leading up to the 2023 general elections, the party campaigned on economically populist policies including cash handouts (฿10,000 digital wallet), expanding healthcare coverage, and raising the minimum wage.

The party is mostly liberal on social issues due to its support for democracy, scrapping of military conscription, decriminalizing sex work, and legalizing same-sex marriage. It is conservative on reforming the lèse-majesté laws and opposes monarchy reforms.

The party is considered pro-business and economically liberal. Under the Yingluck administration (2011–2014), the party passed several cuts in corporate tax and considered reducing corporate income tax even further to boost innovation and business growth.

== Policies ==
=== 2023 manifesto ===
Economic policy

- Raising the minimum wage to ฿600 by 2027
- Raising Thailand's GDP
- Promote cultural and medical tourism
- Introduce a ฿10,000 'digital wallet' for Thais over 16
- Introduce free Wi-Fi in public parks
- Introduce a minimum monthly ฿25,000 salary for workers with a bachelor's degree
- Introduce a monthly retirement fund of ฿3,000 to Thais aged over 60
- Decentralise public hospitals
- Upgrade water management
- Upgrade rail infrastructure
- Construct new rail infrastructure
- Expand Suvarnabhumi Airport
- Expand maternity benefits
- Improve working conditions

Social policy

- Keep the lèse-majesté laws
- Decentralise the central government
- Decentralise public education
- Allow elections for provincial governors
- Rewrite the constitution only to allow elected MPs to vote for a prime minister
- Introduce free HPV vaccinations
- Introduce free medical checkups for Hepatitis C
- Legalize same-sex marriage
- Replace military conscription with a voluntary system

== Pheu Thai Party Prime Ministers ==
Name	Portrait	Start Date	End Date	Election
Yingluck Shinawatra		5 August 2011	7 May 2014	2011 (24th)
Srettha Thavisin		22 August 2023	14 August 2024	2023 (26th)
Paetongtarn Shinawatra		16 August 2024	1 July 2025 (Note: Suspended from her duties by the Constitutional Court from 1 July – 29 August 2025, when the Constitutional Court ruled to remove her from her position with retroactive effect.)	— (26th)

== Pheu Thai Party Speaker ==
Name	Portrait	Start Date	End Date	Election
Somsak Kiatsuranont		3 August 2011	9 December 2013	2011 (24th)

== Organization ==
=== Leadership ===
Leader	Portrait	Took office	Left office	Government		
Leader	Portrait	Took office	Left office	Party	Prime Minister	Term
Paetongtarn Shinawatra		2025 (Unopposed)		PT	Paetongtarn	
Paetongtarn Shinawatra		2025 (Unopposed)		BJT	Anutin	
Julapun Amornvivat		2025 (Elected)		BJT	Anutin	

=== Party structure ===
Since :

- Leader:
  - First Deputy Leader:
  - Second Deputy Leader:
  - Third Deputy Leader:
  - Fourth Deputy Leader:
- Secretary General:
- Deputy Secretaries General:
- Spokesperson:

== Election results ==
=== General elections ===
Election	Total seats won	Total votes	Share of votes	Seat change	Outcome of the election	Election leader
2011	265 / 500	15,744,190	48.41%	▲76 seats	Governing coalition	Yingluck Shinawatra
2014	Election Nullified (Ruled as Unconstitutional)					Yingluck Shinawatra
2019	136 / 500	7,920,630	22.29%	▼129 seats	Opposition	Sudarat Keyuraphan
2023	141 / 500	10,962,522	28.86%	▲5 seats	Governing coalition (until 2025)	Paetongtarn Shinawatra
2023	141 / 500	10,962,522	28.86%	▲5 seats	Opposition (since 2025)	Paetongtarn Shinawatra
2026	74 / 500	5,158,066	15.63%	▼67 seats	Junior partner in governing coalition	Yodchanan Wongsawat

=== Bangkok Metropolitan Administration elections ===
==== Bangkok gubernatorial elections ====
Election	Candidate	Total votes	Share of votes	Outcome
2009	Yuranunt Pamornmontri	611,669	29.06%	Lost ✗
2013	Pongsapat Pongcharoen	1,077,899	40.97%	Lost ✗
2022	Supported Chadchart Sittipunt	1,386,769	52.65%	Elected ✓
2026	Didn't contest			

==== Bangkok Metropolitan Council elections ====
Election	Total seats won	Total votes	Share of votes	Seat change
2010	15 / 61			▼5 seats
2022	20 / 50	620,009	26.77%	▲5 seats
2026 (Note: as Pheu Thai Balanced Life Group)	4 / 50	267,442	12.45%	▼16 seats

==== District Council elections ====
Election	Total seats won	Total votes	Share of votes	Seat change
2010	65 / 361			▲5 seats
