= Puttipong Punnakanta =

Thai politician (born 1968)

- พุทธิพงษ์ ปุณณกันต์
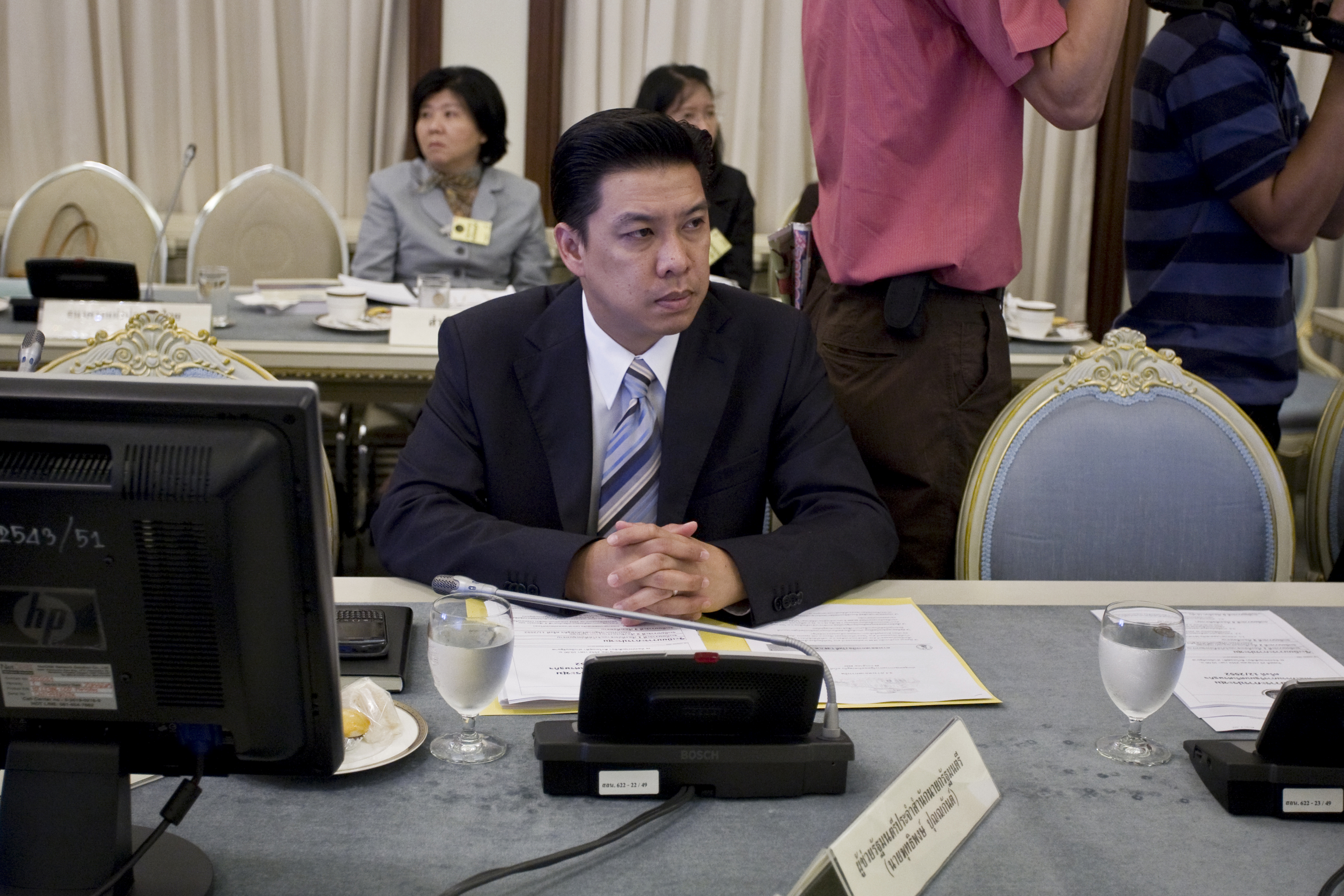
- Phutthipong in 2009

Minister of Digital Economy and Society
- In office 10 July 2019 – 24 February 2021
- Prime Minister: Prayut Chan-o-cha
- Preceded by: Pichet Durongkaveroj
- Succeeded by: Chaiwut Thanakamanusorn

Government spokesperson
- In office 26 August 2018 – 5 February 2019
- Prime Minister: Prayut Chan-o-cha
- Preceded by: Sansern Kaewkamnerd
- Succeeded by: Narumon Pinyosinwat

Personal details
- Born: 20 November 1968 (age 57) New Jersey, U.S.
- Party: Bhumjaithai Party
- Other political affiliations: Palang Pracharath Party (2018–2021); Democrat (2001–2018)
- Spouse: Nusba Punnakanta
- Relatives: Pong Punnakan (grandfather)
- Education: Ohio State University; EU Business School
- Profession: Politician

Puttipong Punnakanta, also written as Buddhipongse Punnakanta (Thai: พุทธิพงษ์ ปุณณกันต์, RTGS: Phutthiphong Punnakan; born 20 November 1968) is a Thai politician. He served as Minister of Digital Economy and Society in the second cabinet of Prime Minister Prayut Chan-o-cha from 10 July 2019 until he was removed from office. In February 2021, he was found guilty of insurrection during protests that led to the 2014 coup d'état. He was released from prison on bail, later in February 2021, which stands in contrast to his sentence still standing at a prison term of seven years.

== Early life and education ==
Puttipong was born on 20 November 1968 in New Jersey, USA. He was nicknamed Bee, the eldest child of Dr.Med. Lurporn and Darika Punnakanta.

He graduated from the Kasetsart University Laboratory School. He received a Bachelor of Economics from Ohio State University, United States in 1992 and he received a Master of Business Administration from EU Business School in Montreux, Switzerland in 1996. Then he returned to work as an assistant project manager of Rajthanee Group and served as an Investment Promotion Officer in Thailand Board of Investment (BOI).

== Political careers ==
In the 2001 election, Puttipong was running for election on behalf of the Democrat Party in Phaya Thai District. While Apirak Kosayothin was the Bangkok governor (2004–2008), he was appointed to the position of Bangkok Spokesperson, he is the first person to accept this position and later was appointed deputy governor of Bangkok to overseeing education and social development, sports and tourism and the commercial aspect of Bangkok.

In 2010, he was appointed to the position of Assistant Minister of Industry and Deputy Spokesman of the Prime Minister's Office In the government of Abhisit Vejjajiva, in conjunction with his tenure as Executive Director of the Democratic Party.

In the Thai 2013–2014 Thai political crisis, Puttipong was one of 9 Democrat Party MPs who resigned from their membership and executive committee and became one of the leaders of the People's Democratic Reform Committee to protest Yingluck Shinawatra government.

In 2018, he joined the government of Prayut Chan-o-cha as Deputy Secretary-General of the Prime Minister (Political) and in October of the same year, he was appointed to serve as a spokesperson for the Prime Minister's Office. In February 2019, Puttipong resigned from the position of the political office to run for election in the name of the Palang Pracharat Party. Later he was appointed Minister of Digital Economy and Society.

On 24 February 2021, the Criminal Court sentenced Puttipong to imprisonment for seven years, resulting in him immediate termination as the Minister of Digital Economy and Society.

Political offices
Preceded by Pichet Durongkaveroj	Minister of Digital Economy and Society; 2019–2021	Succeeded by Chaiwut Thanakamanusorn
