= 2013–2014 Thai political crisis =

Protests and military coup in Thailand

2013–14 Thai political crisis
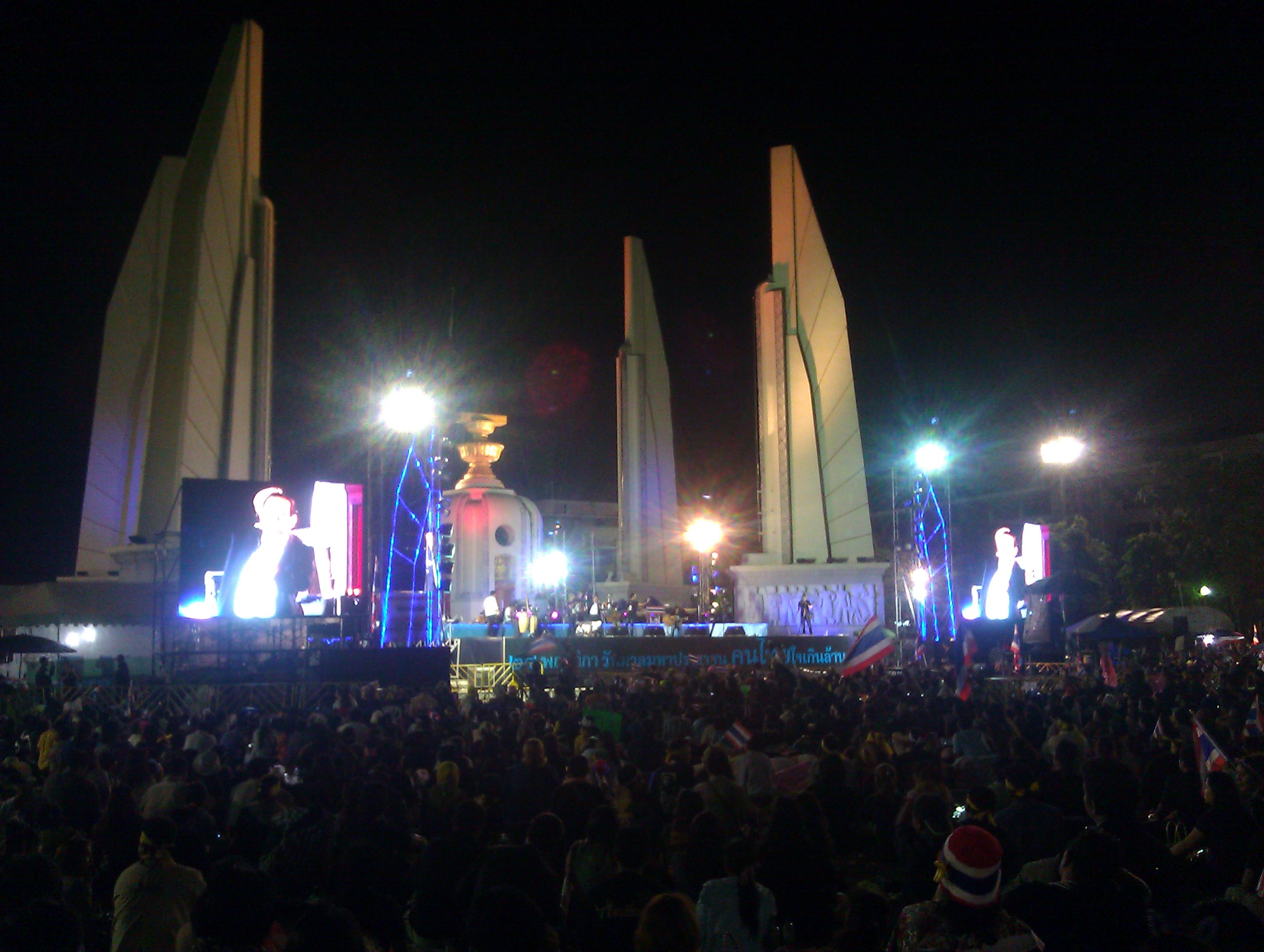
- Protesters at Democracy Monument on 30 November
- Date: 31 October 2013 – 22 May 2014 (7 months and 22 days)
- Location: Thailand
- Caused by: Proposed amnesty bill covering protestors, politicians and the military between 2004 and 2013; Influence of Shinawatra family in Thai politics; Proposed amendment to the 2007 constitution; Center-periphery dissonance; Royal succession
- Goals: Removal of Thaksin-affiliated Pheu Thai Party; Creation of an unelected People's Council to oversee political reforms
- Methods: Street protests; Occupation of government offices; General disruption; Boycott of general election
- Result: Dissolution of House of Representatives on 9 December and new election; Prime Minister Yingluck Shinawatra removed from power; Martial law imposed on Thailand; 2014 Thai coup d'état against the caretaker government; National Council for Peace and Order established

Parties
People's Democratic Reform Committee; Democrat Party	Yingluck cabinet; Pheu Thai Party; United Front for Democracy Against Dictatorship ("Red Shirts")

Lead figures
Suthep Thaugsuban	Yingluck Shinawatra; Niwatthamrong Boonsongpaisan (Acting Prime Minister)

Casualties
- Deaths: 28 (as of 16 May 2014)
- Injuries: 825 (as of 16 May 2014)
- Arrested: 12 (as of 16 January 2014)

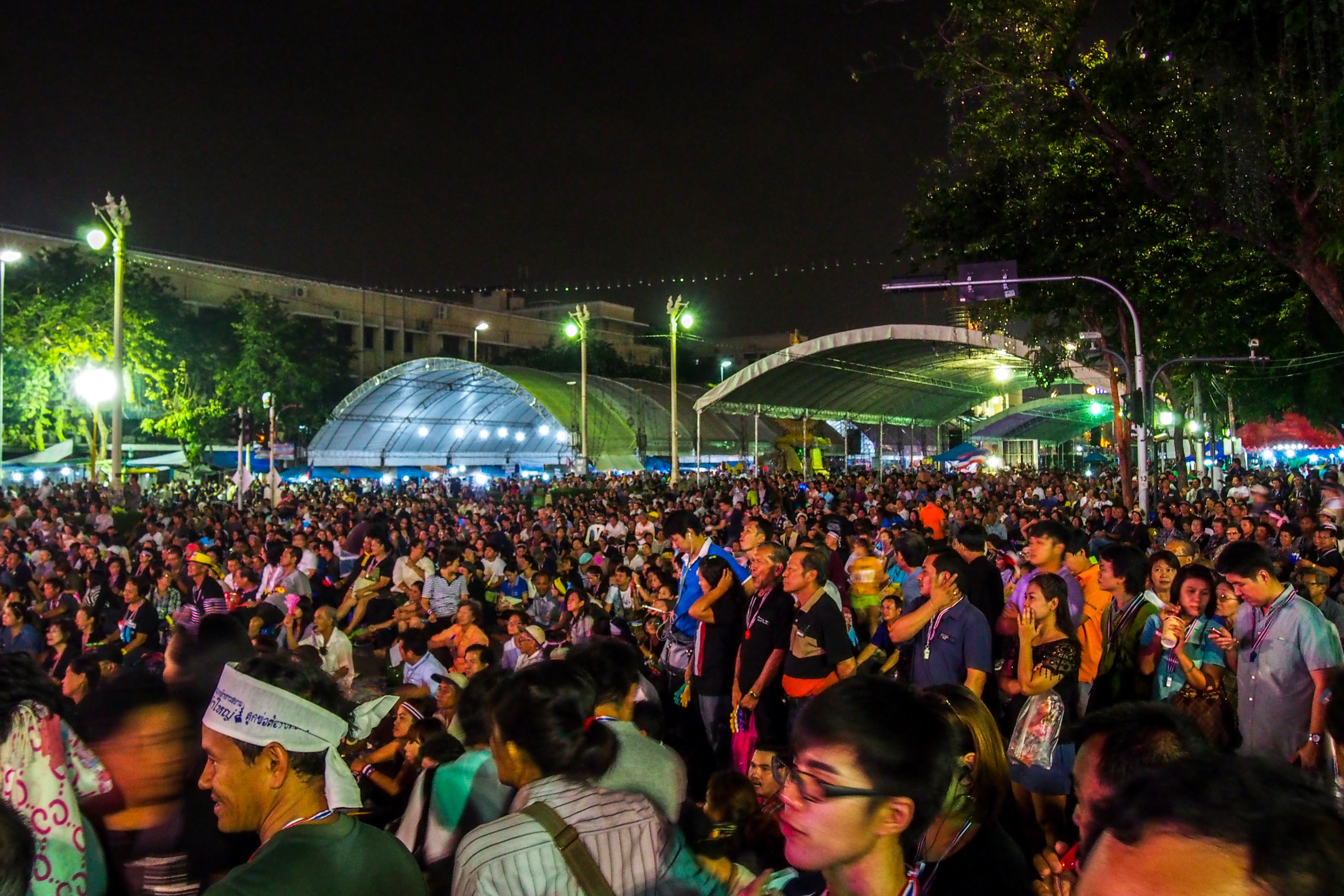
Protests at the Democracy Memorial

The 2013–2014 Thai political crisis was a period of political instability in Thailand. Anti-government protests took place between November 2013 and May 2014, organised by the People's Democratic Reform Committee (PDRC), a political pressure group led by former Democrat Party parliamentary representative (MP) Suthep Thaugsuban. The crisis eventually resulted in the removal of incumbent Prime Minister Yingluck Shinawatra, a coup d'état, and the establishment of a military junta.

The primary aim of the protests was the removal of former prime minister Thaksin Shinawatra's – the brother of Yingluck – influence on Thai politics and the creation of an unelected "people's council" to oversee reforms of the political system. Protesters viewed Thaksin as corrupt and damaging to Thailand's democracy, although he enjoyed strong support in many areas of Thailand, particularly the poorer north and northeast, due to his reforming social programs and economic policies. Political parties allied to Thaksin had won a majority in every election since 2001. Other issues, such as the royal succession, a rural-urban or north-south divide, social inequality, over-centralised bureaucracy, royal and military influence in politics, and class conflict were suggested as factors behind the crisis by analysts and commentators.

Protests were first triggered by a proposed amnesty bill which would have pardoned politicians of various charges from the period following the 2006 coup d'état. Anti-government protestors argued the bill, and a simultaneous government attempt to alter the 2007 constitution, favoured Thaksin and would potentially allow him to return from self-imposed exile due to a corruption conviction. The pro-government Red Shirt movement also opposed the amnesty due to its inclusion of murder charges related to the 2010 military crackdown on pro-Thaksin protests, in which 91 were killed. Opposition from across the political spectrum caused the bill to be rejected unanimously by the Senate of Thailand. Anti-government protests continued however, with demonstrators occupying government offices, blocking major road intersections and holding mass rallies in Bangkok to call for the resignation of Yingluck and her Pheu Thai government. On 8 December 2013, all 153 opposition Democrat Party MPs resigned and Yingluck dissolved the House of Representatives, calling a snap general election for 2 February. Voting was disrupted in areas of Bangkok and southern Thailand by PDRC protesters blocking entry to polling stations, leading to an annulment of the result by the Constitutional Court. Sporadic violence, including shootings, bomb attempts and grenades thrown at protesters led to 28 deaths and over 800 injuries during the course of the protests. On 21 January, Yingluck's government declared a state of emergency in Bangkok and the surrounding areas, to little effect.

Yingluck and nine ministers were removed from office by the Constitutional Court on 7 May 2014 over the controversial transfer of a senior security officer in 2011. Supporters of Yingluck and critics argued that the move was politically motivated and an abuse of judicial power. On 20 May, the Royal Thai Army declared martial law throughout the nation, followed two days later by a coup which removed the government and named General Prayut Chan-o-cha as acting prime minister. In February 2021, three ministers from Prayut's cabinet, Puttipong Punnakanta, Nataphol Teepsuwan and Thaworn Senniam, were found guilty of insurrection during the protests that led to the 2014 coup.

== Background ==
The government of Yingluck came to power in the 2011 elections, in which her Pheu Thai Party won an outright majority. Yingluck is a sister of former prime minister Thaksin, and the Pheu Thai Party was closely aligned with him. Thaksin, who was ousted in a 2006 coup d'état, was living in self-imposed exile to avoid a 2008 corruption conviction and still commanded popular support across much of the country, especially among rural Thais and the urban poor. The Shinawatra family was especially revered in the rural northeast due to the economic and social gains from Thaksinomics: between 2001 and 2011, Isan's GDP per capita more than doubled to US$1,475, while, over the same period, GDP in the Bangkok area soared from US$7,900 to nearly US$13,000.

Several amnesty proposals and amendments to the constitution had been debated by the House of Representatives during Yingluck's premiership. Most of these were popularly perceived as benefiting Thaksin, and were opposed by the Democrat Party. In August 2013, the Pheu Thai-majority House approved a first reading of a draft amnesty bill. Street protests leading up to the parliamentary session were held by an anti-Thaksin group calling itself the "People's Democratic Force to Overthrow Thaksinism" (PEFOT), as well as by the Democrat Party, but these failed to gain momentum. The amnesty bill was handed over to a 35-member scrutinising committee, after which it would be returned to the House for second and third readings.

The committee passed a revised draft of the bill on 18 October 2013. The bill, which in its original form was aimed to absolve civilian protesters, excluding protest and government leaders and the military, was drastically expanded into a "blanket amnesty", covering the period from 2004 to 2013. This would have included the corruption charges laid against Thaksin following the 2006 coup, as well as the murder charges against then Prime Minister Abhisit Vejjajiva and Deputy PM Suthep Thaugsuban related to their conduct during the 2010 mass protests in support of Thaksin.

== Timeline of the events ==
=== Protests against amnesty bill ===
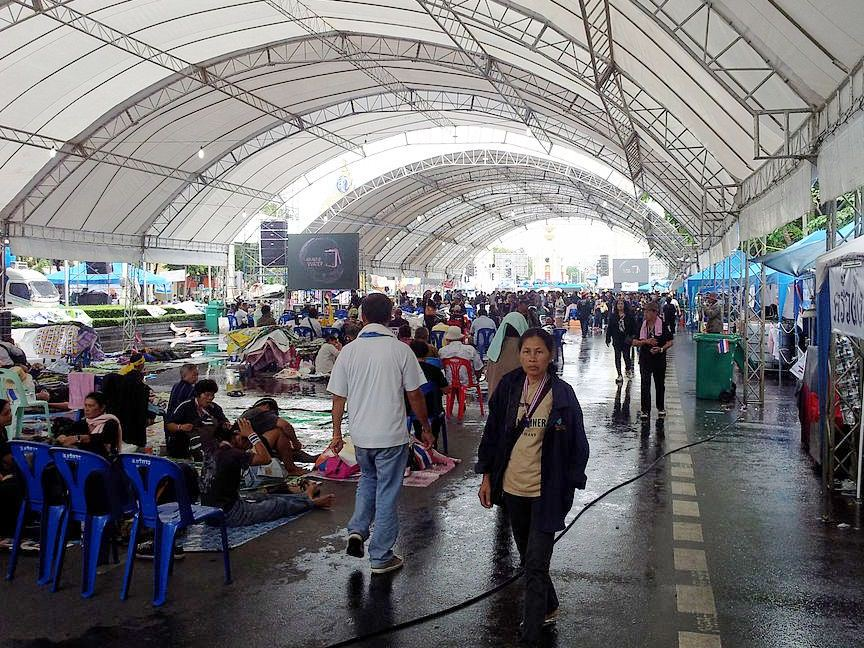
Protesters near the Democracy Monument in Bangkok, November 2013

The bill was passed by the Pheu Thai Party–dominated House of Representatives on 1 November 2013 at around 04:00.

The final draft of the bill would have pardoned protesters involved in various incidents of political unrest since 2004, dismissed Thaksin's corruption convictions, and annulled murder charges against Abhisit and Suthep. The bill sparked opposition from both the Democrat Party and the pro-government Red Shirt movement. Criticism was levelled at the government for passing the vote in the unusual pre-dawn session to prevent opposition. Thaksin's opponents protested against absolving Thaksin of his convictions. Thaksin supporters criticised the bill for absolving those responsible for the crackdown on the 2010 protests. On 4 November 2013, several protests took place in Bangkok, as well as in several provincial cities. Several universities and organisations issued statements condemning the bill. However, an independent poll conducted between 11–13 November reported that the majority of surveyed Thai people wanted the protests to end.

Faced with strong opposition, Yingluck issued a statement, urging the Senate to contemplate the bill with the interests of the people in mind. (Procedurally, the House could not recall the bill after voting; the decision lay with the Senate.) Pheu Thai Party leaders also promised not to revive the bill, or any other amnesty bills, if it was rejected by the Senate. The Senate subsequently voted on the bill on 11 November 2013, unanimously rejecting it. At the same time, the International Court of Justice confirmed Cambodia's sovereignty over disputed territory near the temple of Preah Vihear, prompting fears of further political tension from analysts, although the border remained calm.

Despite the amnesty bill being dropped, protests in Bangkok continued. Suthep and eight other Democrat members of parliament resigned from their positions to lead demonstrations, calling for the general populace to strike and undertake civil disobedience. The protests gradually shifted towards an anti-government agenda, criticising Yingluck and her government for being proxies for Thaksin and being an elective dictatorship. Several groups protested, including Suthep's Civil Movement for Democracy, the Green Politics group, the Network of Students and People for Reform of Thailand (NSPRT), PEFOT, the Dhamma Army, and the State Enterprises Workers' Relations Confederation. Whistle blowing became a symbol of the protests. (Note: Note that the People's Alliance for Democracy (PAD), or "Yellow Shirts", which led protests in 2006 and 2008 had since largely declined in popularity and influence. While there was substantial overlap between the 2013 anti-government protesters and the former PAD, the 2013 protesters did not wear yellow.)

=== Constitutional amendment ===
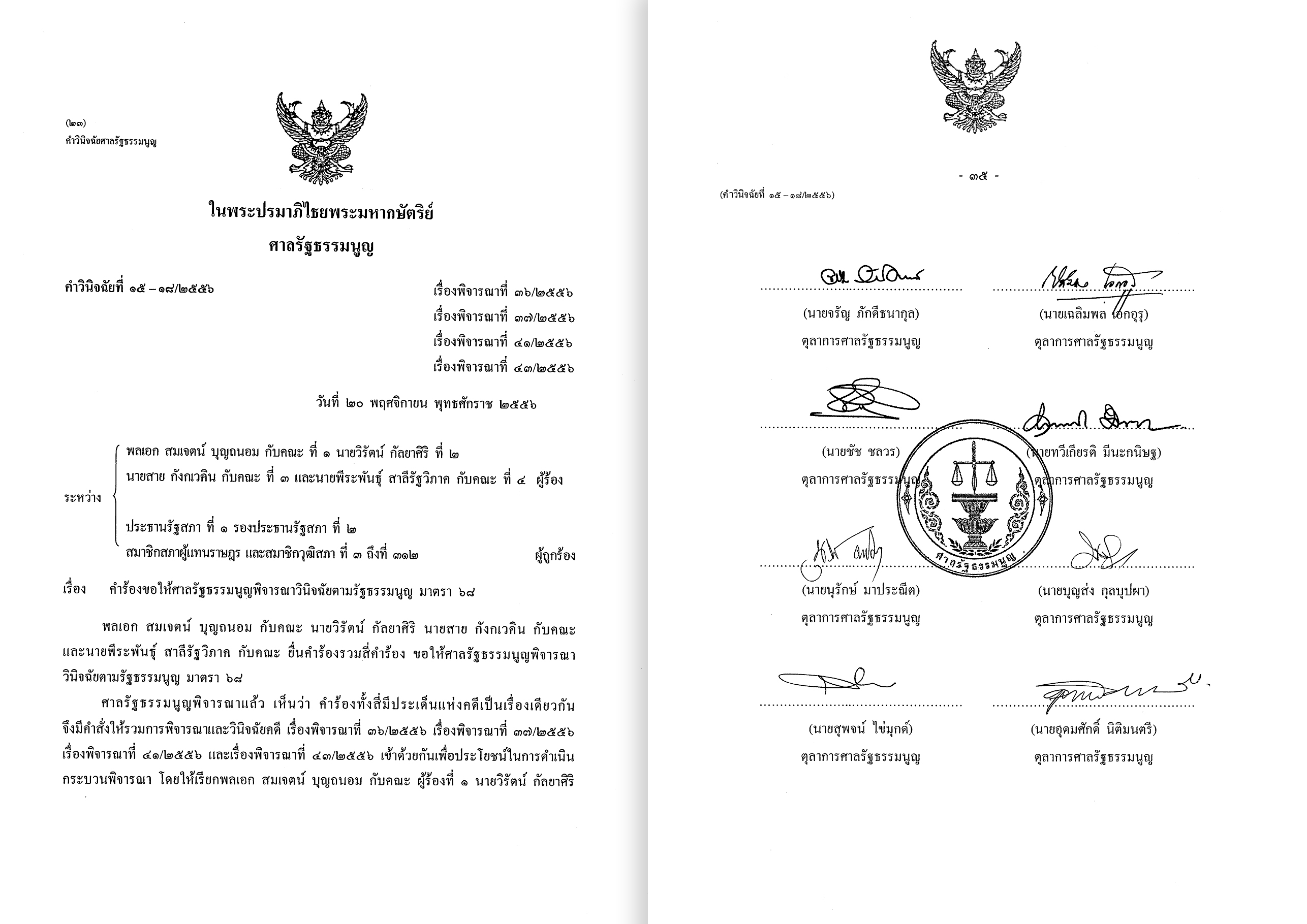
The first and last pages of the Constitutional Court's decision with the signatures of the judges

On 20 November 2013, the Constitutional Court invalidated a government-proposed amendment to the 2007 constitution, which would have restored elements of the 1997 People's Constitution. The major alteration would have been the restoration of a fully elected Senate, but this was blocked by the court, leaving half of the Senate as appointed seats.

The court found that both the proceedings of the amendment and the contents of the new version were unconstitutional. The court ruled that the final draft voted on by the National Assembly was not the same as the one originally considered, and the new draft was brought to the sessions without an introductory motion. The court also decided that the time limit for amending the draft (which left only one day for the filing of amendments) was unlawful, and many MPs were found to have voted on behalf of absent MPs. With regard to the contents, the court said the amendment would have allowed the relatives of the representatives to become senators, weakening the ability of the Senate to scrutinise the House of Representatives. The 1997 constitution did not prohibit relatives of representatives becoming senators and resulted in the National Assembly gaining the infamous nickname "Assembly of Husbands and Wives" (สภาผัวเมีย). The court also held that the conversion of the Senate into a fully elected chamber would destroy the bicameral system.

In its decision, the court stated:

The constitutional amendment pursuant to the petitions is a return to the former defects which are perilous and likely to bring an end to the faith and harmony of the majority of the Thai people. It is an attempt to draw the Nation back into the canal, as it would bring the Senate back to the state of being an assembly of relatives, assembly of family members and assembly of husbands and wives. In consequence, the Senate would lose its status and vigour as the source of wisdom for the House of Representatives, but would merely be an echo of the people from the same group. The principles of the bicameral system would be debased, leading to the monopoly of state powers and the exclusion of the participation of the members of various sectors and professions. The amendment is thus an effort of its initiators to regain the national government power by the means not recognised by the Constitution [...]

Chulalongkorn University Dean of Law Nantawat Boramanand viewed the statement as an expression of disapproval towards the Pheu Thai-dominated House. The court held that it was competent to deal with the case to provide checks and balances to the principles of separation of powers. Some legal scholars argued that the court could not interfere with the constitutional amendment, as the National Assembly was not exercising the legislative power, but the constituent power which is not subject to the system of checks and balances between the three branches.

The Pheu Thai Party rejected the decision, claiming that the court had no jurisdiction over the case, earning the Constitutional Court the nickname "San Khrai Fang" (ศาลใครฟัง; "court heeded by no one"). Although her party ignored the court decision and asserted the legality of the draft amendment, Yingluck withdrew the draft from King Bhumibol Adulyadej on 8 December 2013 before the King signed it into law. The Pheu Thai Party's denial of the court decision resulted in anti-government protest numbers swelling over the following weekend of 23–24 November 2013, with at least 100,000 protesters gathering at the Democracy Monument on Ratchadamnoen Avenue. Protest leaders claimed up to a million people joined the rally. The UDD-led Red Shirts, who had reconciled with the government after the amnesty bill was dropped and had been rallying its supporters at Rajamangala Stadium prior to the court decision, also resumed their counter-protest, with about 40,000 supporters arriving on 24 November.

The National Anti-Corruption Commission (NACC) ruled on 7 January 2014 that it cleared 73 politicians, including Yingluck, in relation to the unsuccessful bid to create a fully elected senate. However, 308 others from the upper and lower houses were found to be in violation of Thai law. The announcement was only based on a preliminary investigation, but if the 308 members were officially found guilty by the commission, they could be banned from politics for five years by the upper house of the National Assembly, which would make the final decision on their cases.

=== Seizure of government buildings ===
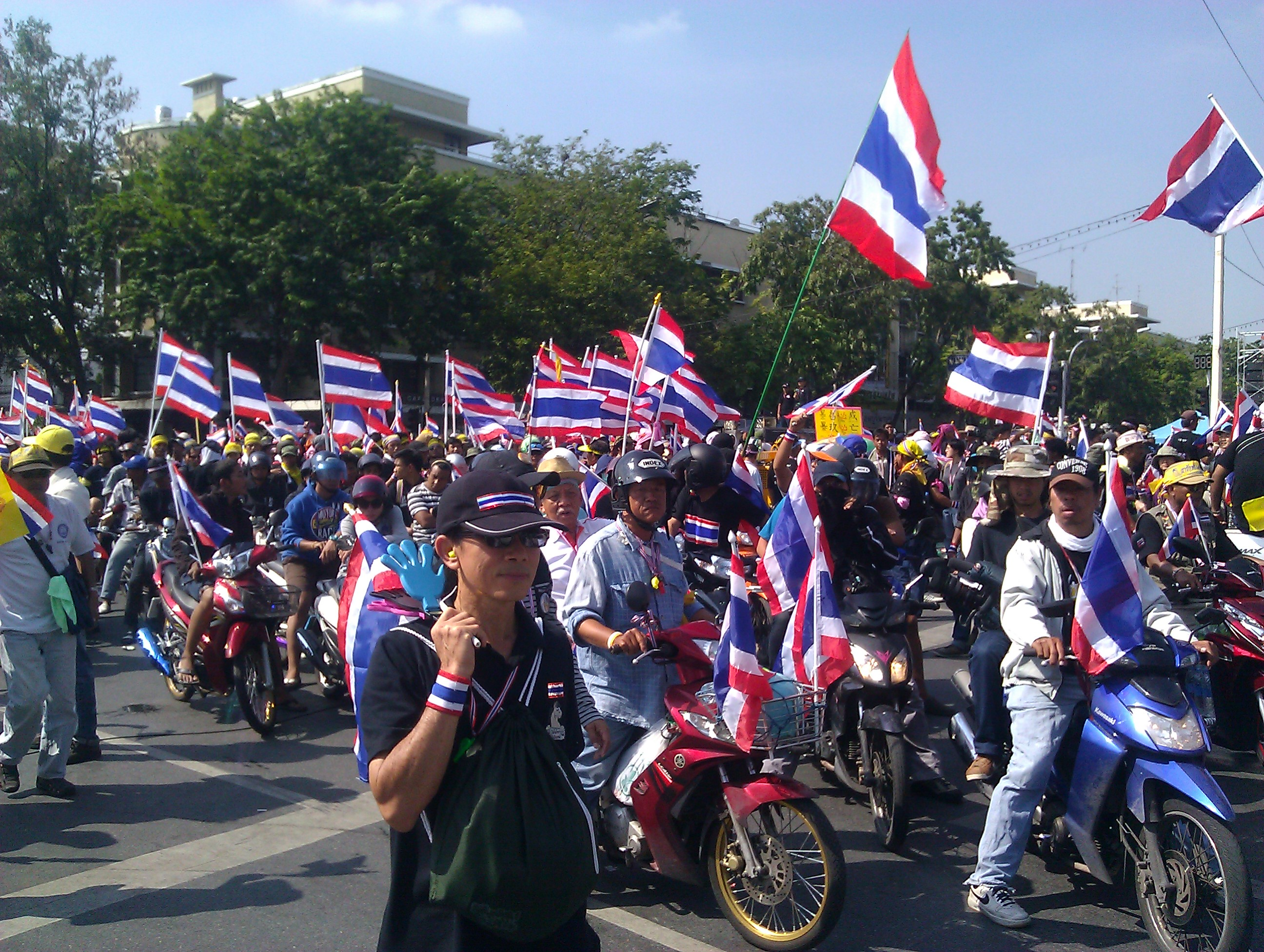
Protesters mobilising on 1 December

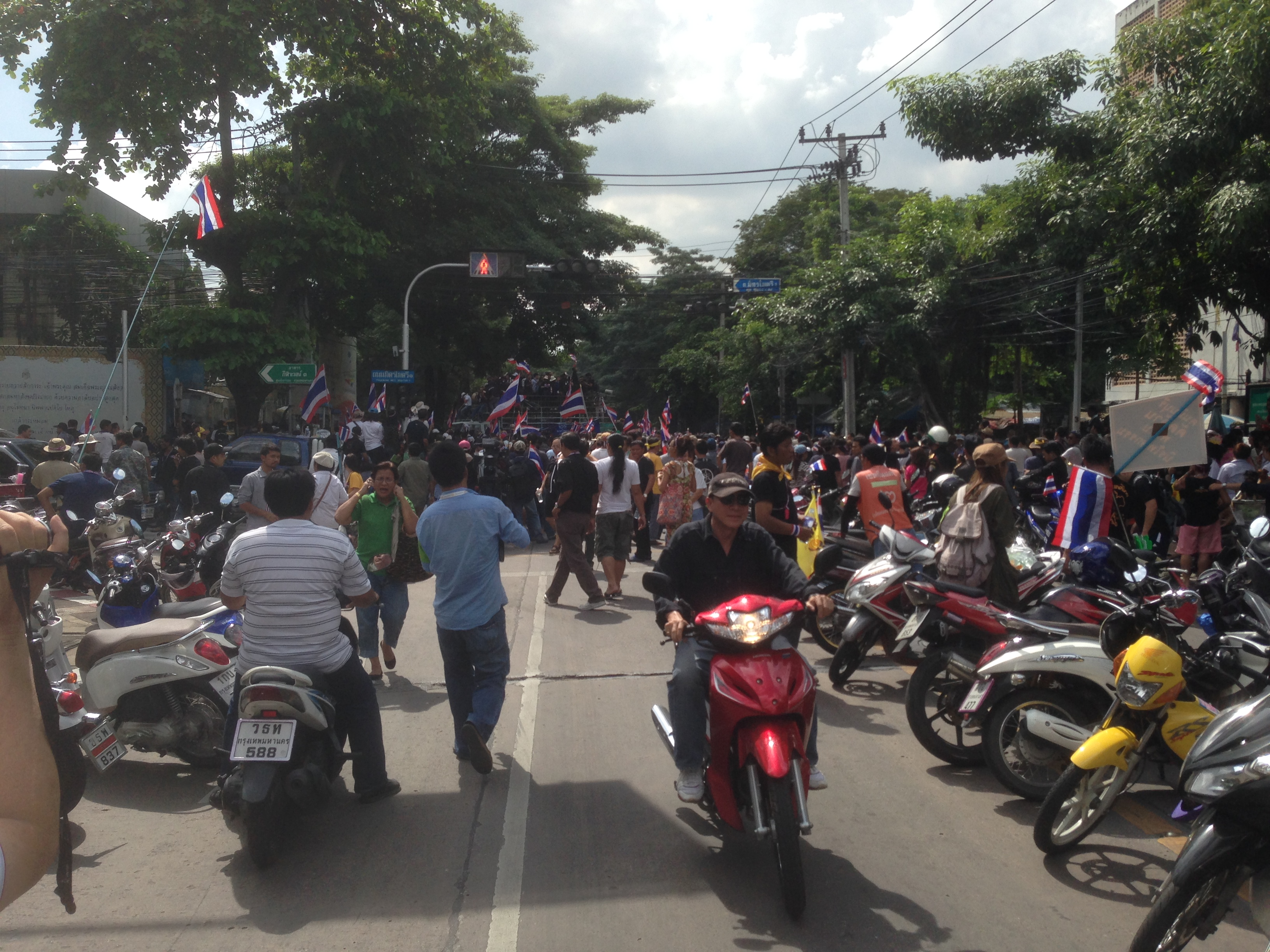
Demonstration at the Ministry of Labour, Bangkok

On 25 November 2013, anti-government protesters from the People's Democratic Reform Committee led by Suthep began marched to several government offices and forced their way inside the Ministry of Finance, the Budget Bureau, the Ministry of Foreign Affairs, and the Public Relations Department, forcing their closure without police intervention, due to government fears that this could result in a repeat 2006 military coup. Yingluck invoked the Internal Security Act (ISA) in all districts of Bangkok and Nonthaburi Province, and the Bang Phli and Lat Lum Kaeo Districts of Samut Prakan and Pathum Thani Provinces respectively. (This was in addition to the central districts of Bangkok, where the ISA had been in effect since the previous month.) However, no direct confrontations between the protesters and security authorities occurred. The protesters continued on 27 November by rallying outside another ten ministry offices, cutting off electricity and forcing the evacuation of the Department of Special Investigation's headquarters, and staging a sit-in at the Chaeng Watthana Government Complex. Protesters also rallied at twenty-four provincial halls, mainly in the south, a traditional Democrat Party base of support.

Protesters broke into the offices of state-owned telecommunications companies CAT and TOT on 30 November, disrupting internet services for several hours.

The protests had been peaceful before short violent clashes on 30 November and 1 December 2013. On the night of 1 December, violence erupted between anti-government Ramkhamhaeng University students and Red Shirt government supporters near Rajamangala Stadium. University students attacked a taxi containing a red shirt supporter. Gunshots were fired at the students, resulting in four deaths and more than fifty people wounded. The gunman was identified by an eyewitness as a Red Shirt protester, while PDRC core member Sathit Wongnongtoey claimed that "police officers had taken off their uniforms and donned red shirts to attack Ramkhamhaeng students in front of the university". UDD leaders subsequently ended their rally the following morning.

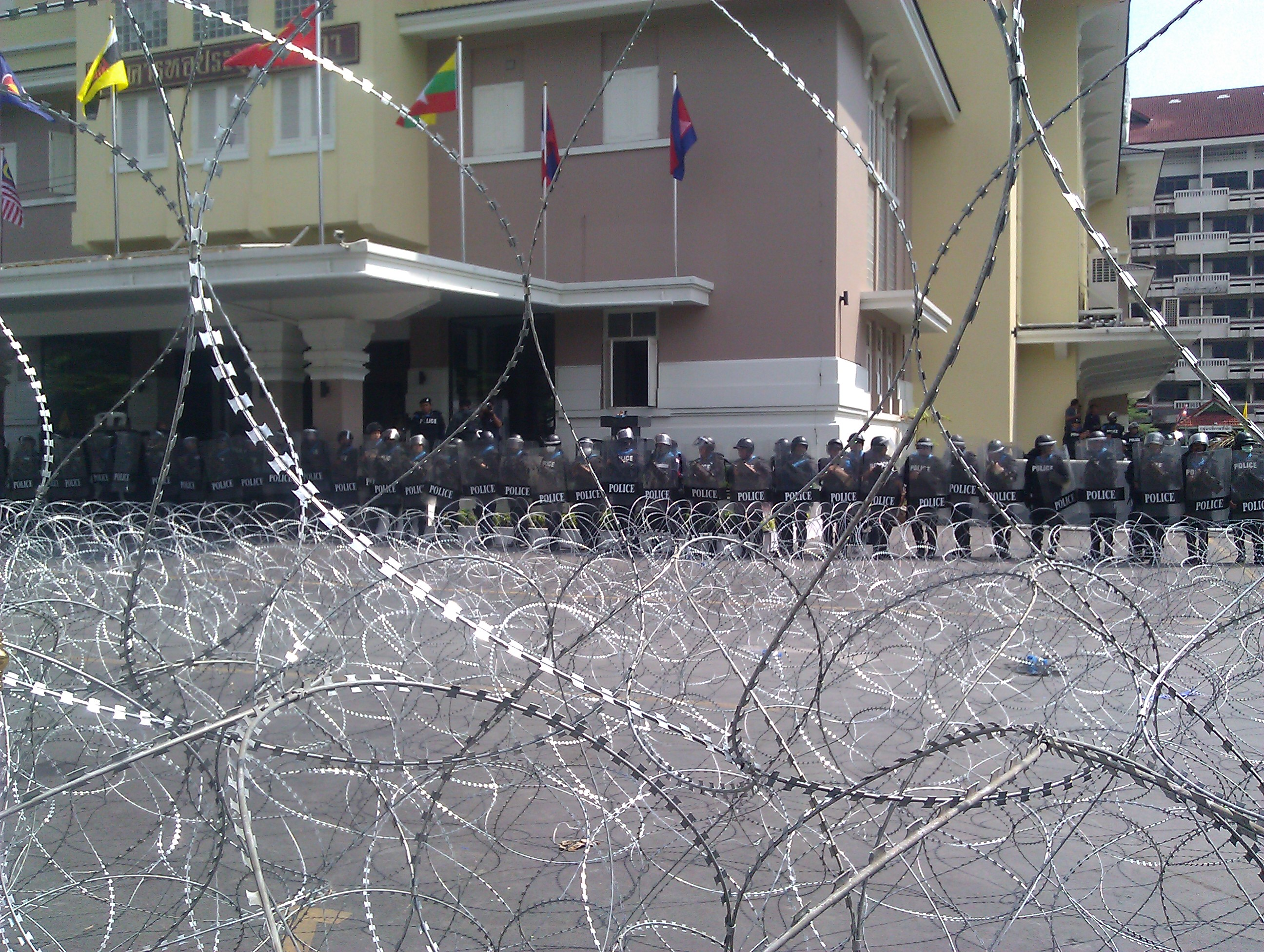
Police guarding a barricade, Ministry of Education, 1 December

Suthep, representing the newly created People's Democratic Reform Committee (PDRC; literal translation of the Thai name: "People's Committee for Complete Democracy with the King as Head of State"), had vowed to overthrow the Yingluck government on 1 December in a "people's coup" attempt. That day protesters tried to force their way into Government House and the Metropolitan Police headquarters, but were halted by police using barricades, tear gas, and water cannons. About 2,700 unarmed soldiers were called in to support the police. That afternoon, Yingluck cancelled planned media interviews and moved to an undisclosed location when the building she was in was surrounded by protesters. Protesters also entered several television stations, including the Thai Public Broadcasting Service, forcing them to broadcast a public address by Suthep, an act condemned by three media organisations. In a televised address, Suthep said that protesters had occupied twelve government buildings, but this claim was denied by the national security chief Paradorn Pattanathabutr. Suthep later unilaterally announced that he had met with Prime Minister Yingluck to deliver an ultimatum "to return power to people" within two days. He reaffirmed his stance that Yingluck's resignation or the dissolution of the House of Representatives was not acceptable, and repeated his calls to replace elected officials with an unelected "People's Council" that would choose leaders. Yingluck had rejected the demands on the basis that suspending the democratic process would be unconstitutional. On 3 December 2013, the police removed barricades and allowed protesters to enter the site, reducing tensions to allow both sides to celebrate King Bhumibol Adulyadej's birthday.

=== Electronic attacks ===
The Digital Attack Map website recorded relatively large scale distributed denial of service (DDoS) attacks against internet services in Thailand corresponding almost directly to the period of demonstrations, 27 November through 20 December 2013.

=== Government dissolution ===
After the King's Birthday, Suthep called for protesters to take to the streets and march to Government House on 9 December in a "final battle". The protest was attended by 160,000 people. On 8 December, all 153 minority Democrat MPs jointly resigned in a move seen as trying to further pressure the government. In response to the intensive protests, Yingluck dissolved the House of Representatives on 9 December 2013 and proposed a general election for 2 February 2014, a date that was later approved by the election commission. The PDRC insisted that the prime minister stand down within 24 hours, regardless of her actions. Yingluck insisted that she would continue her duties until the scheduled election in February 2014, urging the protesters to accept her proposal: "Now that the government has dissolved parliament, I ask that you stop protesting and that all sides work towards elections. I have backed down to the point where I don't know how to back down any further."

Yingluck survived a no-confidence vote in the House of Representatives on 28 November 2013. Meanwhile, supporters of the NSPRT claimed the seizure of army headquarters, demanding that the military join the protests. In response, on 29 November Army Commander Prayut Chan-o-cha urged protest groups not to involve the military and called on rival sides to resolve the crisis peacefully. The government abstained from the use of excessive force, relying on batons, water cannons, and tear gas instead.

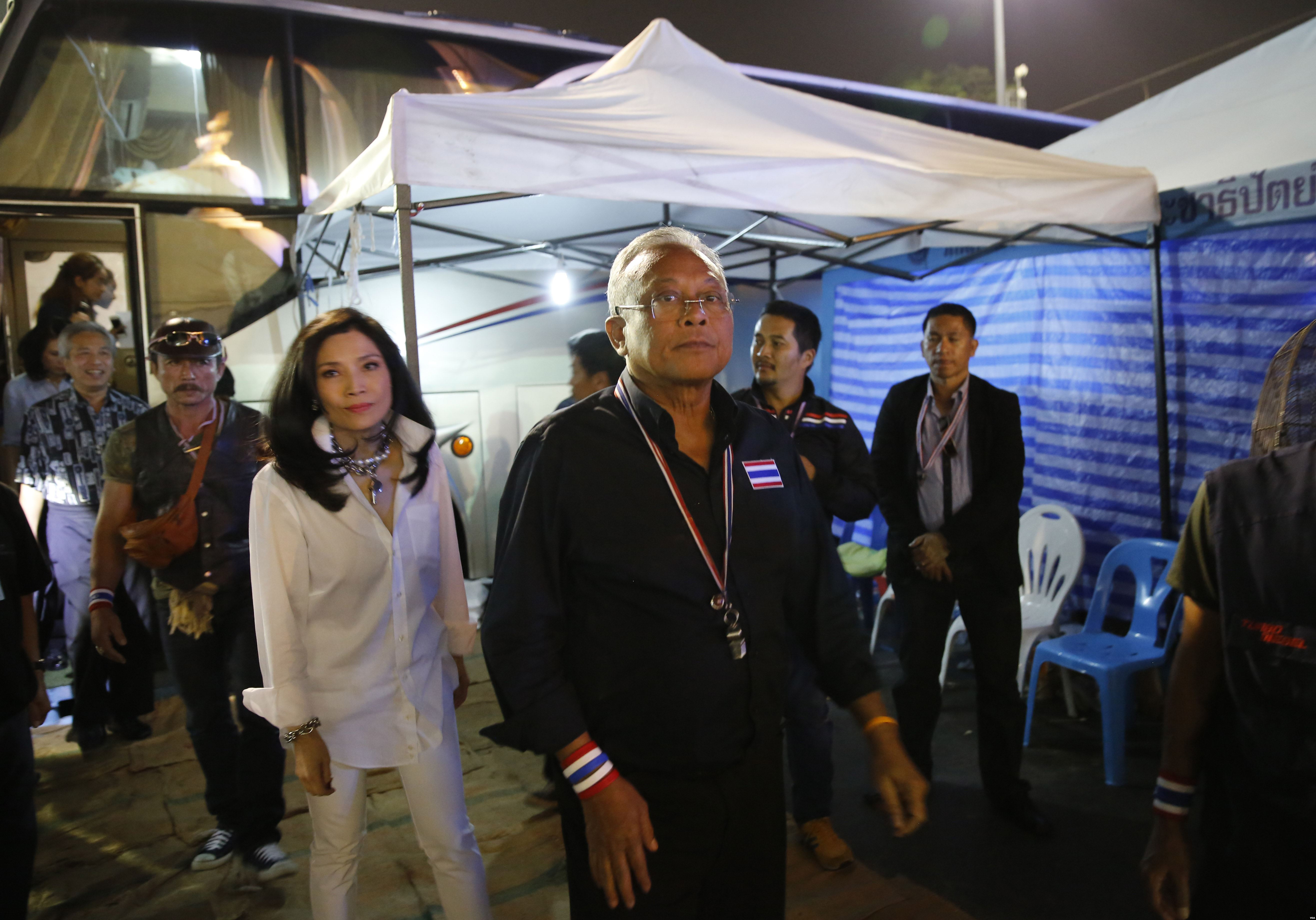
Anti-government protest leader Suthep Thaugsuban, centre, with his wife Srisakul Promphan, in white, arrive at the Democracy Monument, Bangkok, 15 December 2013.

=== Post-government dissolution ===
On 17 December 2013, PDRC secretary Suthep called for rallies with slogans demanding:

- Reform before election
- Immediate resignation of Yingluck and the cabinet
- Establishment of a non-elected People's Council to start a reform process for 12 to 18 months.

On 21 December 2013, the Democrat Party announced that it would boycott the February elections. In response to the EC's registration process for party-list candidates for the scheduled election in February 2014, anti-government protesters marched to the Thai-Japanese sports stadium, the venue of the registration process, on 22 December 2013. Suthep and the PDRC led the protest, with the former declaring, "If the government and the EC still insist on the election, they are challenging the will of the people".

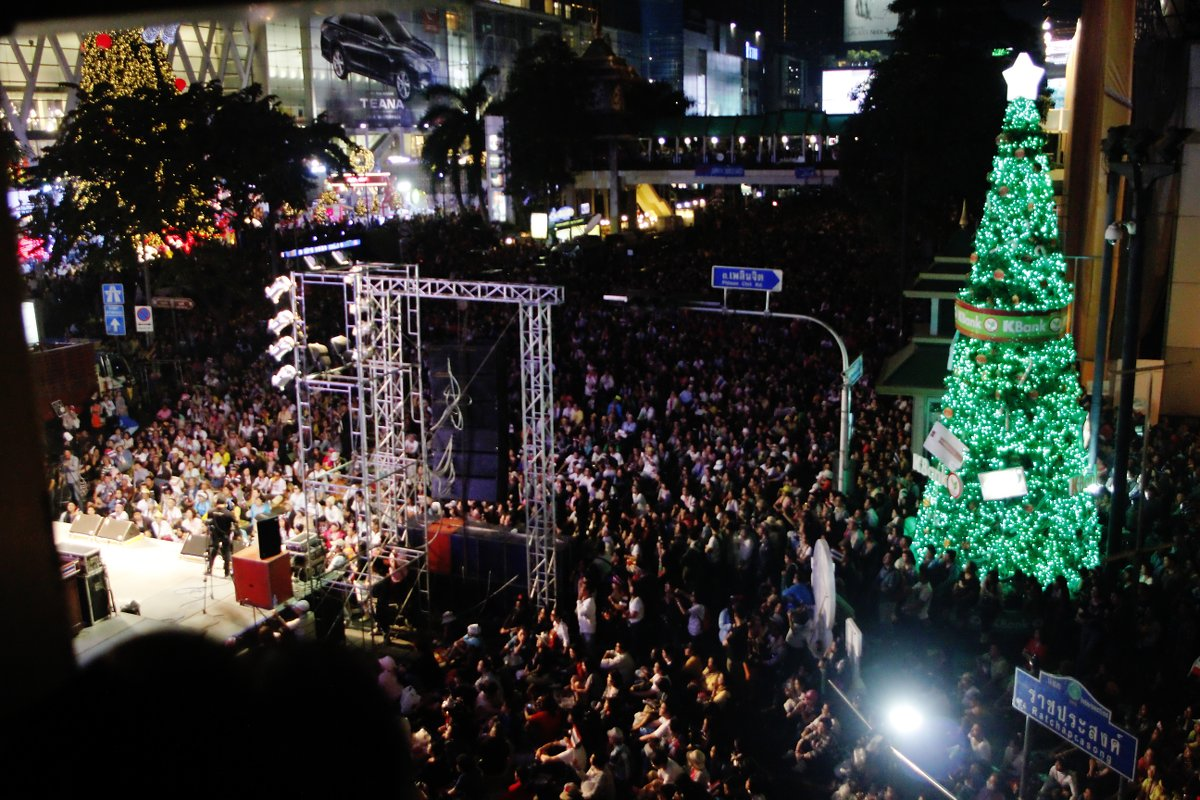
Anti-government protests at Rajaprasong Intersection, Bangkok, 22 December 2013

The PDRC estimated that 3.5 million people participated in the march on 22 December, while security forces claimed that approximately 270,000 protesters joined the rally. According to international sources, tens of thousands of protesters attended. Yingluck and the Pheu Thai Party reiterated their election plan and anticipated presenting a list of 125 party-list candidates to the EC.

On 26 December 2013, protesters at the Thai-Japanese sports stadium clashed with police. Two persons, one of them a police officer, were killed. Protesters armed themselves with sling shots and wore gas masks to fight with police, and around 200 people were injured overall. Due to the escalation in violence, the election commission released a statement in which it urged the government to consider postponing the elections. Deputy Prime Minister Pongthep Thepkanchana responded to the statement on behalf of the government, "February 2, 2014, was set as the election date in the royal decree dissolving Parliament, and there is nothing within the constitution or the law that gives the government the authority to change this date." He explained further that the government remained open to discussions with protesters.

On 27 December 2013, Thailand's army chief General Prayut Chan-o-cha released a statement to the media in which he did not rule out the possibility of a military coup, stating: "Whether it is going to happen, time will tell. We don't want to overstep the bounds of our authority. We don't want to use force. We try to use peaceful means, talks and meetings to solve the problem." During the same period, an arrest warrant was issued for Suthep for insurrection, but police did not act on the order for fear of further disruption.

=== Occupation of Bangkok ===
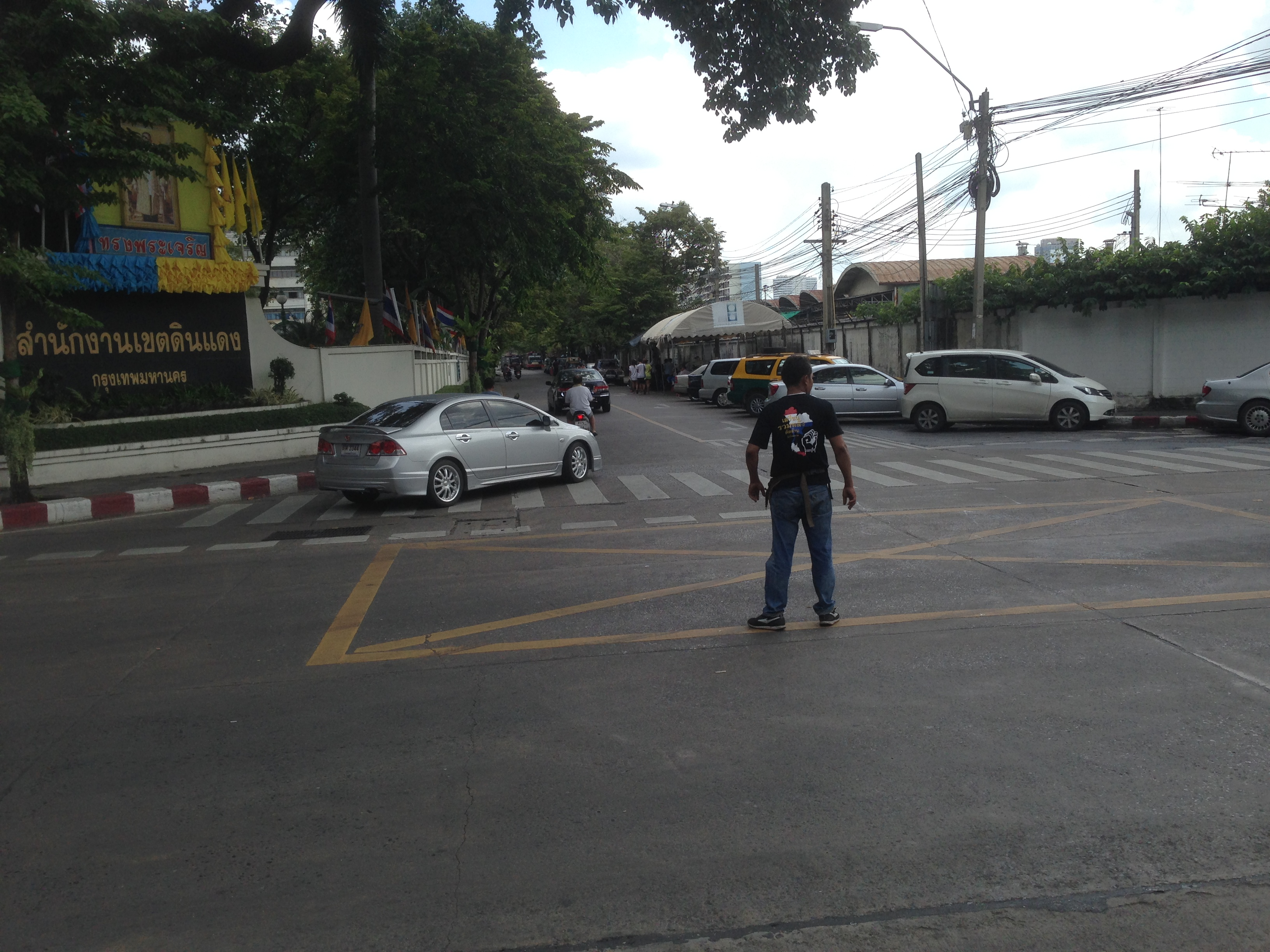
Demonstrator mans a road block near the Ministry of Labour in Bangkok.

As of 28 December 2013, 58 political parties were registered for the 2 February general election, after the EC concluded a five-day registration process on 27 December 2013. On the evening of 27 December, Suthep announced in a speech at the Democracy Monument in Bangkok that the anti-government protesters planned to shut down the Bangkok on 13 January 2014:

Bring your clothes, food and necessities for our victory may take months. Bangkok residents should clear their work before the New Year. We will shut down and occupy Bangkok a few days after the New Year. We won't leave even a single inch to let people in the Thaksin regime to abuse us. Bangkok people who feel uncomfortable will have time to manoeuvre, leaving those with the hearts to fight to join hands in wiping out the Thaksin regime.

As part of the speech, Suthep informed the public that the PDRC emptied its bank account before it was frozen at the order of the Department of Special Investigation (DSI), thereby allowing for the compensation of anyone who incurred damage as a result of the protests. Suthep stated that the relatives of the police officer murdered in the clash on 26 December would be given one million baht and that this sum would apply to any other deaths. Owners of damaged vehicles and motorcycles would also receive financial aid.

On 2 January 2014, Suthep made a speech at the Rajadamnoen boxing stadium. In this speech he explained the plan for the protest action on 13 January, in which he said that he does not "...want Thailand to become a failed state." According to Suthep, in addition to the closure of major intersections—Pathumwan, Suan Lumpini Park, Asoke, Lardprao and Ratchaprasong—all government offices would be disconnected from electricity and water, and government vehicles would be unable to use emergency lanes (left open for ambulances, people needing medical attention and public buses) on those roads that were occupied. At a press conference held on the same day, pro-government leader Jatuporn Promphan launched a new campaign to defend Bangkok against the protesters, whom he called "the elite's network". Jatuporn explained that pro-government forces will "fight under peaceful principles" and that further announcements would be made.

On 4 January 2014, the head of the Center for the Administration of Peace and Order (CAPO), Surapong Tovichakchaikul, announced on live television that anyone who joined the protest movement would be in violation of the Thai Criminal Code. Surapong described Operation Occupy Bangkok as a serious threat to the stability of the nation and revealed that the government will enact a "capital protection" plan, involving the simultaneous use of combined forces, to cope with the shutdown. The involvement of the military was not mentioned in the telecast, but Surapong assured viewers that the government's plan complied with international standards. In a speech at the Democracy Monument on the evening of 4 January, Suthep announced that all of Yingluck's assets would be seized following the defeat of the "Thaksin regime".

On 5 January 2014, Suthep led thousands of protesters through western Bangkok in a pre-shutdown march. According to PDRC spokesman Akanat Promphan, two further pre-shutdown marches were scheduled for 7 and 9 January. On the same day, caretaker Prime Minister Yingluck stated on her Facebook page that an election is the best way for the political conflict to be resolved, "If you don't want the government to return to power, you have to fight us in the election." A clash between supporters from both political factions also occurred on 5 January in Thailand's northern city of Chiang Mai.

On 6 January 2014, Yingluck's secretary general, Suranand Vejjajiva, informed the media that the government might implement an emergency decree in the event of violence during protest actions. To date, the military had maintained its neutrality and the secretary general explained that the government continued to respect this stance. In a second press conference, Caretaker Information and Communications Technology Minister, Anudith Nakornthap, spoke specifically of the possibility of violence, "The government is concerned for the safety of the people. If the demonstration is peaceful and lawful, it can go ahead. But several earlier rallies saw a number of groups violate the law—including the rights of others—by stirring up violence. The government would therefore like to implore those intent on using violence to think again." Also on 6 January, Yingluck confirmed that an emergency decree was a last resort. She remained at her family home to monitor the political situation while police officers guarded her residence. Yingluck also explained that the Internal Security Act (ISA) will be used by the caretaker government to handle the mass protest.

On the same day, Credit Suisse analysts, in a document titled "Thailand Market Strategy", stated: "Our worst-case scenario envisions a multi-year continuation of the events of the past eight years—frequent changes of government, raucous street protests and ever-present tensions—but no serious escalation of violence." In relation to the Thai financial situation, analysts Dan Fineman and Siriporn Sothikul further explained: "For the broader market, a rebound is unlikely until investors are comfortable that the situation will not deteriorate further. We do not believe that we are yet at that point".

Also on the same day, a Red Shirt conference was held in Nakhon Ratchasima Province to discuss the political crisis, including campaigns in response to a possible military coup. Over 5,000 coordinators and activists under the leadership of the United Front of Democracy Against Dictatorship (UDD) heard speeches by UDD chairwoman Thida Thawornseth, who spoke of preparations in the event that the military took power from the Yingluck government. Conference participants also discussed the response of the UDD to Operation Occupy Bangkok.

On 9 January 2014, Yingluck expressed concern about the possibility of third-party involvement on 13 January, explaining that the CAPO will be monitoring the situation from the National Police Bureau office. Yingluck further explained, "violence is sometimes the work of a third party which is a concern...The answer to a resolution for the country does not rest with me. It's a matter of how we can cooperate so that Thailand moves forward and protesters are satisfied. I'm ready to co-operate."

Students from three universities demonstrated against the anti-government movement. Students of Kasetsart University, Silpakorn University, and Srinakharinwirot University lit "candles for peace" at their Bangkok campuses as part of their political action. At Kasetsart University, 1,000 citizens and students were cited:

We, Thai citizens who trust in peace and democracy, would like to use our votes according to the constitution and request the all groups to discuss and compromise to prevent violence. We support all political expressions as soon as they are under the law and do not violate other's rights and freedom. Election by citizens!

At 02:30 on 13 January 2014, the Democrat Party headquarters was struck by bullets fired from a Toyota sedan. No injuries resulted. While the party had not yet joined the shutdown protest, it announced that it would join in boycotting the 2 February election.

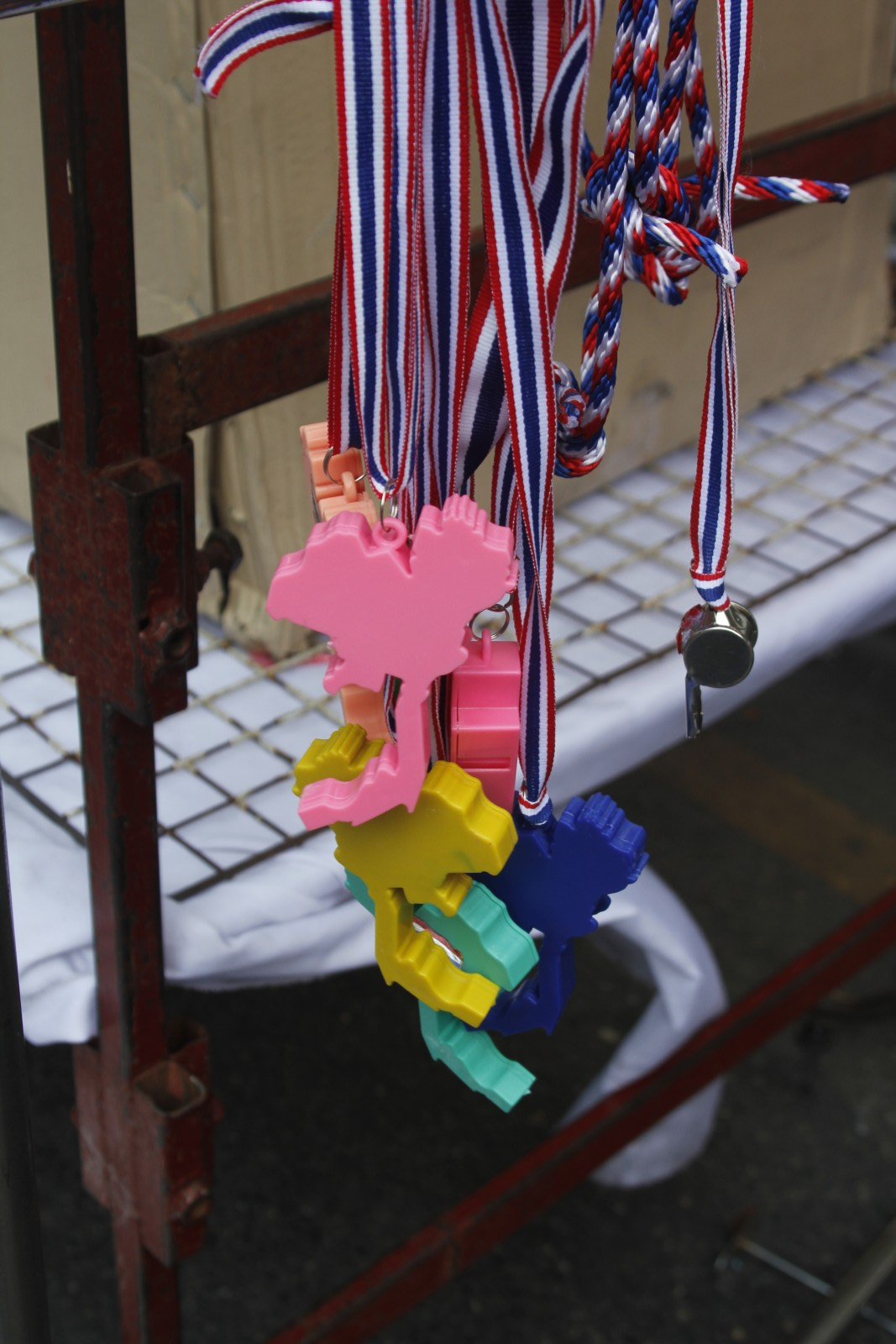
Plastic whistles in the shape of Thailand on sale by anti-government protest groups.

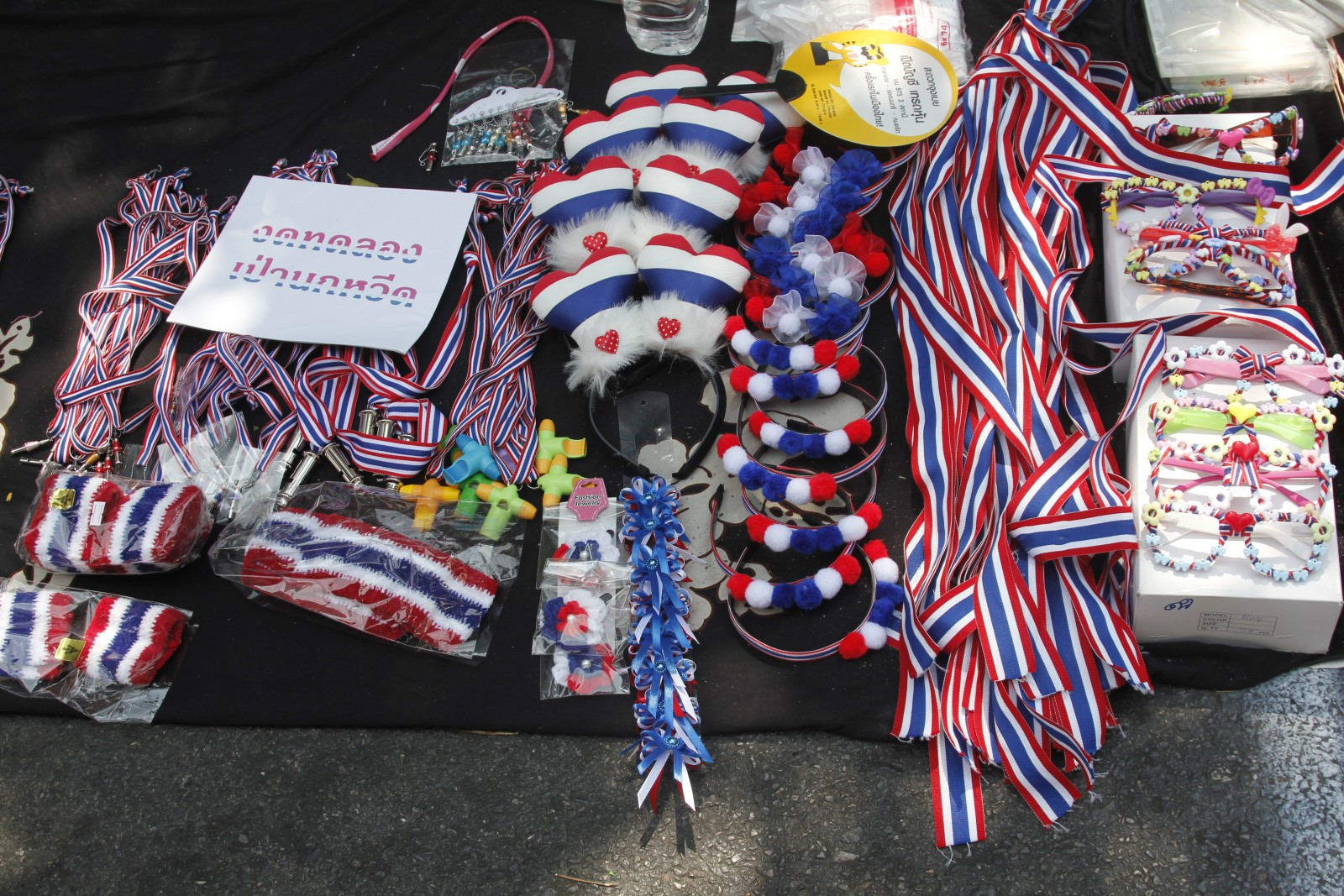
Fashion accessories in the colours of the Thai flag are signature of anti-government protesters during Bangkok shutdown in January 2014.

On the evening of 14 January 2014, another attack was made against the Democrat Party. The attackers attempted to bomb the home of Democrat Party leader Abhisit Vejjajiva. The attack failed and an Explosive Ordnance Disposal (EOD) team discovered a US-manufactured M26 hand grenade pin. EOD team members inferred the hurling of a hand grenade onto the roof of the room where Abhisit's father normally stayed. The Bangkok Metropolitan Administration assisted police investigators in their review through the provision of surveillance tapes. Three men and a woman with four grenades, a gun, and ammunition were arrested at a Sukhumvit Road checkpoint on the same evening.

The political situation became more complicated, with the National Anti-Corruption Commission investigating allegations that Yingluck was criminally negligent in her handling of a surplus rice deal with China. The commission had already implicated Yingluck's former commerce minister and more than a dozen other officials. Were the commission to deliver a guilty verdict, Yingluck would be impeached and forced to stand down.

On 17 January 2014, PDRC security guards reported that two or three explosions were heard at Chaeng Wattana Road, Lumphini Park, Lard Prao intersection, and Suan Pakkad Palace. It was also reported that shots were fired from a black Honda Accord sedan with no injuries. The explosion and gunshots forced activities on the stage of the PDRC to halt temporarily. A hand grenade was also thrown at the Bangkok governor's home but no injury was sustained.

On the same day, another grenade attack near the Lotus Charoenphol shopping mall injured thirty-eight protesters and killed one during a procession led by Suthep. PDRC security officers report that the grenade was launched from a partially demolished three-storey building. At 20:00 that evening, Bangkok Metropolitan Administration's Erawan Emergency Medical Services Centre reported that thirty-eight casualties had been received. The following morning the report was updated to reflect that one person died, the ninth person killed since the 2013 crisis. The Metropolitan Police Bureau said that video clips examined by police showed two men acting in a suspicious manner.

On 19 January 2014, a security guard based at the rally site of the Network of Students and People for Reform of Thailand (NSPRT) on Ratchadamnoen Nok Avenue was hospitalised by a gunshot from an unknown shooter. Journalist Andrew MacGregor Marshall expressed his belief that, "They [PDRC] know that they cannot win the February elections, so they will do all they can to prevent the polls from taking place", concluding that, "the prognosis for Thailand is depressingly bleak."

That afternoon, another bombing attack occurred in which 28 people were injured at the Victory Monument anti-government protest rally site. According to Thaworn Senneam, a former Democrat MP at the rally who believed that he was the target of the bomb, an unidentified man threw an explosive device near a press centre tent behind the rally stage and fled at 13:30. Dr Suphan Srithamma, Director-General of the Health Department, revealed on the day after the incident that four people had been killed and 238 injured in the anti-government protests thus far.

On 19 January 2014, the armed forces remained in neutral. The army's Supreme Commander, General Thanasak Patimaprakorn, urged a peaceful outcome with the interests of the Thai nation of the utmost importance and that any further discussions should be undertaken with an independent mediator present. The general explained, "Both the government and the protesters may lose but the nation will gain. If they don't talk, we won't see the way,..."

Niran Pitakwatchara, commissioner of the National Human Rights Commission (NHRC), stated on 19 January that the Yingluck administration needed to exercise caution in its interactions with PDRC leaders, as arrests may inflame the situation. Niran explained that, as the government would be held responsible for the loss of lives and injuries during the protest actions, government representatives and agents needed to be circumspect in all of their dealings with the protesters to reduce tension. The commissioner stated:

What must be urgently done is to reduce the stance of wanting to arrest PDRC leaders because if such a strong stance continues, the problem would reach a dead end. What's more, do not think of the protesters as the enemy of the government and speed up clarifications and dialogue in a bid to reduce violence.

On 20 January 2014, National Security Council chief Paradorn Pattantabutr informed the Reuters news agency: "We're prepared to use the emergency decree...Everyone involved including the police, the military and the government is considering this option very seriously but has not yet come to an agreement", further explaining, "if their [anti-government protesters] tactics change and they close banks or government offices permanently then the chance for unrest increases and we will have to invoke this law."

On Monday, 3 February 2014, PDRC protesters allowed the re-opening of Lat Phrao and Democracy Monument areas to traffic after protesters dismantled their rally stages at the two locations and moved to strengthen their occupation in and around Lumphini Park.

=== State of emergency ===
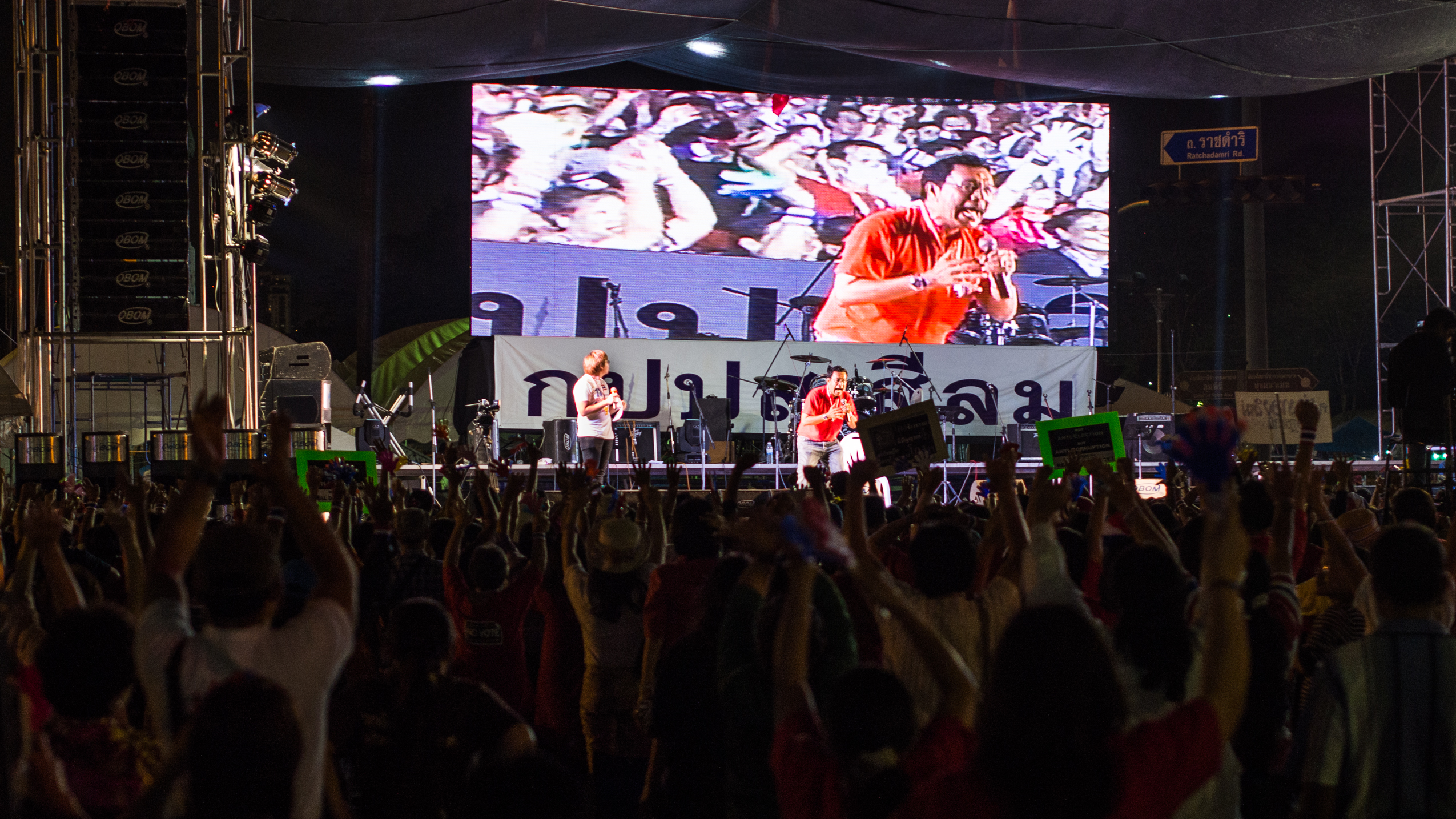
Anti-government protesters gather at the intersection of Si Lom and Rama 4 Roads the day before the scheduled elections

On 21 January 2014, a 60-day state of emergency was declared, providing the government with the authority to invoke curfews, censor the media, disperse gatherings, use military force to "secure order", detain suspects without charge, ban political gatherings of more than five persons and declare parts of the country inaccessible. According to Foreign Minister Surapong Tovichakchaikul, protesters had triggered the decision by blocking government offices and banks, and obstructing government officials from being able to conduct their business and lead their lives in a secure fashion.

On 22 January 2014, Kwanchai Praipana, a leading figure of a pro-government faction, was shot in Udon Thani Province. Police concluded that the attack was politically motivated and used closed-circuit television (CCTV) footage as part of the investigation and reported the involvement of a "bronze pickup truck". Prior to the incident in Udon Thani, three grenade attacks killed one person and resulted in several injuries, but led to no arrests. Following news of the shooting, Suthep remained adamant regarding Operation Occupy Bangkok, stating "We will keep fighting until we win". He threatened to shut down Thailand's air traffic control.

On the same day, the New York Times published an article containing interviews with a number of former and current EC members. EC member Somchai Srisutthiyakorn expressed a belief that the elections needed to be held at a suitable date to ensure that the "election benefits society". Somachai said, "I am afraid that if the election goes ahead, there will be violence and it may lead to a coup". The government had started impeachment proceedings against Somchai during the week of 13 January. The commissioner was accused of "dishonestly exercising or omitting to exercise any of his duties". According to the news article the charges were primarily symbolic, as the duration of the trial would be protracted, lasting many months, with the verdict to be announced well after the elections.

On 24 January 2014, the Thai Constitutional Court declared that the postponement of 2 February election date was the prerogative of its members. At the time of the decision, the original amnesty bill proposal that triggered the first round of protests in late-2013 was no longer up for consideration. A nationwide Bangkok University poll of 1,018 voters revealed that four out of five Thais would cast a ballot on 2 February and more than two million voters had registered for the advance polls, according to an EC statement released on 24 January.

On 26 January 2014, caretaker Labour Minister Chalerm Yoobamrung, (also the CMPO director), publicly announced the impending arrest of Suthep on the charge of leading an insurrection. Chalerm warned that if any loss of life occurred during the arrest, the police should not be blamed. A joint meeting involving the Department of Special Investigation (DSI) and the CMPO held on the same day announced that arrest warrants for 58 protest leaders had been processed. Under the conditions of the emergency decree, those who were arrested could be detained for 30 days before further legal action. DSI Director-General Tarit Pengdith informed the media that negotiations would commence between the CMPO and PDRC leaders to regain government control over occupied state agency offices.

On the same day, Suthin Taratin, a Thai protest leader, was speaking on top of a truck as part of a rally at a polling station where advanced voting was to take place. He was struck by gunfire and later died of his injuries. Three others were injured and PDRC spokesman Akanat Promphan, stepson of Suthep, delivered a public announcement in which he stated: "Prime Minister Yingluck Shinawatra, as the head of the government and the person who declared the state of emergency, must take responsibility for today's incidents, or else the public will revolt and call for justice."

On 27 January 2014, the caretaker Labour Minister (who was also the Director of the CMPO), Chalerm Yoobamrung, announced that protesters hindering access to government buildings would be arrested if they did not leave their positions within 72 hours. Chalerm stated that he will take full responsibility for the process and clarified that only those protesters at government buildings would be affected.

The same day, Yingluck met with the EC to discuss the possibility of postponing the election due to the latter's fear of election day violence. Following a three-hour meeting at the Army Club, caretaker Deputy Prime Minister Pongthep Thepkanchana informed the media that the polling date remained unchanged. Election commissioner Somchai Srisuthiyakorn stated that the EC would organise the 2 February vote to the best of its ability, including the enactment of measures to prevent violence and the staging of a second round of elections to accommodate voters hindered during the inaugural voting stage. Labor Minister Chalerm Yubamrung, recently appointed as the head of the government's crisis response agency, explained that 10,000 police officers would be mobilised to ensure the safety of voters during the election. During the meeting at the Army Club, violence broke out when a PDRC protester was shot in the abdomen. After the shooting, protesters attacked the suspected gunman who turned out to be a police officer. Police claimed that the undercover policeman only fired in self-defence after being attacked by PDRC protesters.

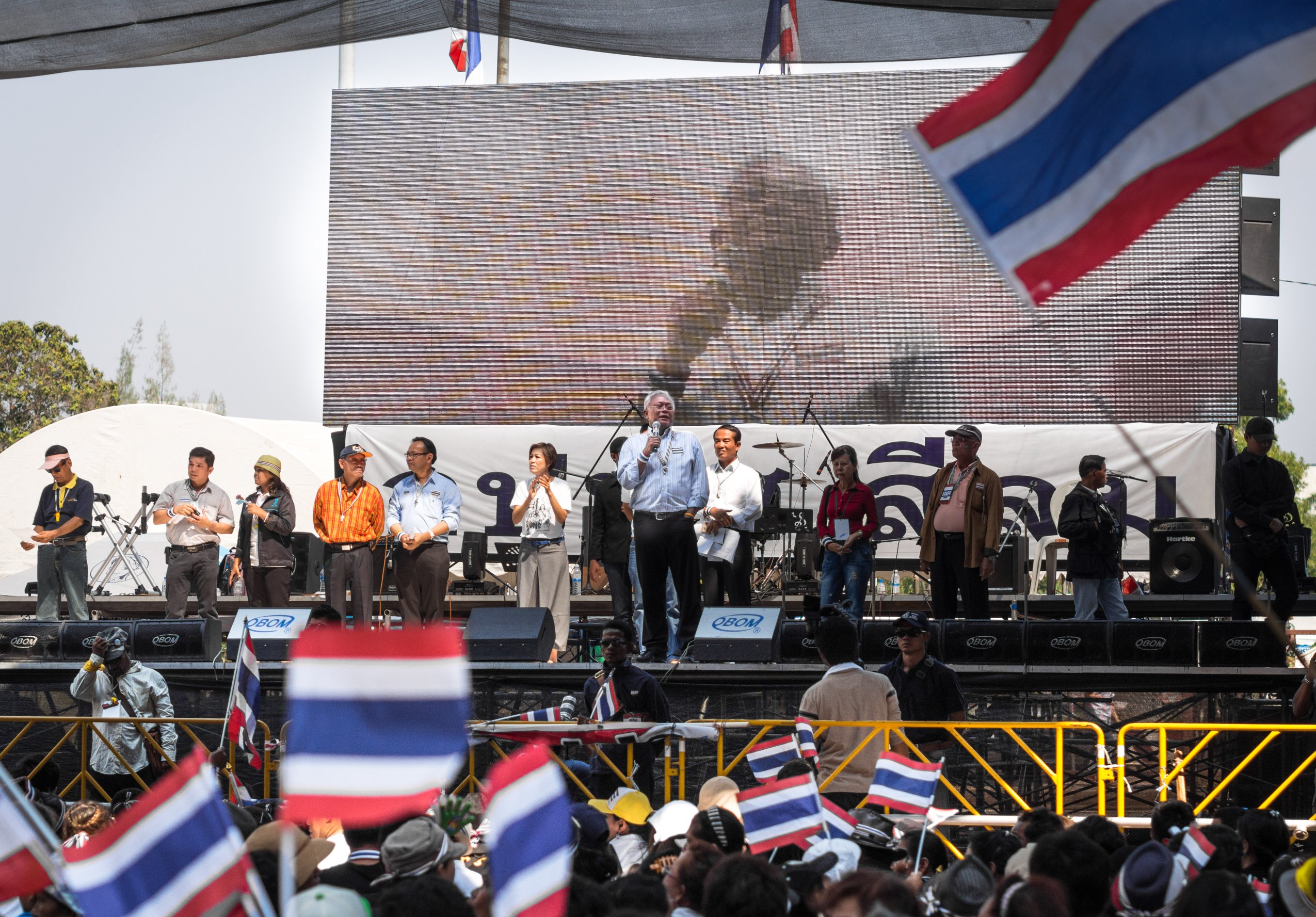
Suthep Thaugsuban speaks on general election day at the Silom anti-government protest site.

On 30 January 2014, further protests were held as part of the anti-election campaign. Protest leader Suthep led protesters through a section of the capital's commercial area, encouraging others to join election day actions to prevent voting. The police announced that a further 190,000 officers would be deployed throughout the nation, with an emphasis on Bangkok and Thailand's ten southern provinces.

On the morning of 31 January, Chalerm was managing affairs at the civil court in Bangkok in response to the PDRC's bid for a court ruling to revoke the emergency decree. A petition was submitted to the court by PDRC core leader Thaworn Senneam and a decision was expected in the afternoon. Chalerm stated that the caretaker government's handling of the election situation would remain the same despite the PDRC submission. However, a new CMPO director would need to be appointed if the civil court sided with the PDRC petition. Chalerm stated, "I plead the premier to allow me to continue the job as I'm ready to work." Chalerm threatened to arrest Suthep following the election.

In Thaksin's hometown of San Kamphaeng, a reporter for the South China Morning Post spoke with pro-government supporters who stated that they were "willing to sacrifice" their lives in support of the ruling Puea Thai Party. Supporters said that they were prepared for Yingluck to relocate the capital to Chiang Mai, with Supon Fumuljaroen, vice-chairman of the United Front for Democracy against Dictatorship (UDD) in Chiang Mai Province, stating, "The majority of red-shirts really like the idea of a separate state. If they stage a coup, we can live without Bangkok." Pichit Tamoon, Chiang Mai general secretary for the UDD, said: "We have police forces on our side and together with the northeast we have the backing of 37 [out of 77] provinces. Yingluck will win." Tamoon also responded to claims that the UDD was stockpiling weapons: "We have no arms but we have the police force on our side."

Suthep explained on the evening of 31 January that a confrontation and violence was not his intention. Suthep declared that polling places would be able to function normally. However, sources also stated that Suthep believed that the election date will be nullified because of various legal problems that would emerge afterwards.

=== February 2014 election ===
Despite an announcement by the PDRC that they would not hinder the election process, advance voting did not take place in 87 constituencies, mostly in Bangkok and the south of Thailand. Disruptions occurred in 10 of Thailand's 76 provinces. Protesters attempted to disrupt advance voting for the scheduled elections, with most gathering in Bangkok. According to EC Secretary-General Puchong Nutrawong, advance voting in the north and northeast had been accomplished with the exception of Surin Province. Of a total of 2.16 million people registered for advance voting nationwide, 916,210 of them in Bangkok, around 440,000 people were prevented from voting. Sunai Phasuk, a Human Rights Watch senior researcher said,

It's a sad day for democracy when the right to vote[...]is assaulted by a political movement that claims to be striving for reform and people's empowerment. Everything that happened today shows they are striving for the opposite.

In total, 48.7 million Thai citizens were eligible to vote for 500 seats in the lower house of parliament that represented 375 constituencies. In the polling booths, voters chose both one candidate and a single political party, while in the 22 constituencies that consisted of only a single candidate, more than 20 percent of the eligible votes must be received to achieve success.

The smooth completion of 2 February election did not resolve Thailand's problematic political situation, as issues of remained: first, due to protester blockades, 28 constituencies across eight provinces—Chumphon, Surat Thani, Songkhla, Phuket, Phatthalung, Trang, Krabi, and Nakhon Si Thammarat—failed to register candidates. Second, the constitution required at least 475 filled seats, or 95 percent of the total number of seats, and disruptions caused by protesters meant that this target could not be reached. The EC, which believed that the final result would fall three seats short, explained that it would be necessary to hold by-elections over several months in problematic constituencies until all 500 members of the parliament's lower house were selected. In the 2011 elections, a 75 percent voter turnout rate was registered.

The lawful distribution of ballots has been hindered by anti-government protesters. Although Lieutenant General Amnart confirmed that police would ensure the safety of those responsible for delivering the ballots, as of 1 January ballot papers stuck at post offices in Chumphon, Nakhon Si Thammarat's Thung Song District, and Songkhla's Hat Yai District were unable to reach southern polling stations.

On 29 January, the Thai army announced is support of the CMPO operation to protect the election. Deputy army spokesman Winthai Suvari provided details of the deployment of military personnel in areas of particular concern and a joint operation with the CMPO to ensure the safety of state officials and others. The army's other key responsibilities involved providing medical aid in areas close to protest sites, as well as traffic co-ordination duties. Assistant national police chief Amnart Unartngarm stated that its 200,000 police officers, plus 1,450 rapid-deployment units, would guard 93,535 polling stations in 76 provinces plus Bangkok.

On 31 January 2014, the EC realised that 44,000 more election officials would be needed on polling day, including 4,000 people to oversee voting booths in the Thai capital. An EC commissioner explained to the media that a total of 93,305 polling stations were being set up nationwide, but staff shortages were worst in the southern provinces, where 90 percent of polling stations were insufficiently staffed. In addition to the staffing problems, ballots for 14 southern provinces remained undelivered at central post offices in the provinces of Chumphon, Nakhon Si Thammarat, and Songkhla. The EC stated that the election should proceed legitimately in more than 66 provinces, with a second opportunity offered on 2 March for those constituencies that were unable to vote. An army spokesman stated that soldiers would protect all polling stations, but explained that force would not be employed to end conflict between voters and anti-government protesters.

Also on 31 January, the EC consulted with a legal team to discuss the issue of the 28 constituencies in the southern provinces where candidate registration did not occur in late-December due to protests. The consultation was in anticipation of the possibility that opponents of the election might file lawsuits to invalidate the election based on the constitutional condition that voting must occur nationwide on a single day. EC chairman Supachai Somcharoen stated that the EC and its legal advisers would carefully examine the constitution to handle the matter, but also explained, "There are several factors that could invalidate the poll. But the EC has no authority to decide. It is the Constitution Court that has the authority to rule on the matter if petitions are lodged."

On the eve of the election date, violence erupted again in Bangkok after PDRC demonstrators blocked the delivery of ballot boxes from the Lak Si District office in northern Bangkok. A group of armed PDRC supporters started a gunfight and numerous gunshots were exchanged, leaving at least six people injured.

As a consequence of the violence, the EC suspended Sunday voting in the Lak Si District. Voting was also cancelled in the provinces of Krabi, Chumphon, Trang, Phangnga, Phatthalung, Phuket, Ranong, Songkhla, and Surat Thani due to a shortage of ballots.

Although Suthep repeatedly claimed that his cause is peaceful and "without weapons", photos and videos of the clash clearly showed protesters wearing the green armband of the PDRC guard with assault rifles. Suthep's statement, affirming that the demonstrations would not obstruct voting, was belied, as anti-government protesters blocked delivery of ballot boxes in addition to preventing people from voting.

According to the EC, the final turnout for 2 February elections—counted from 68 provinces and excluding the nine provinces where voting was cancelled—was 47.72 percent, or 20,530,359 voters (voting was closed prior to the 15:00 cut-off time in some areas of these provinces). The highest participation rate was in Chiang Mai, where 827,808 voters, or 75.05 percent, participated from a total 1,103,069 eligible voters. Of the total ballots cast in Chiang Mai, 530,427, or 64.08 percent, were valid; 129,983, or 15.7 percent, were invalid; and 167,398, or 20.22 per cent, were no-vote ballots. For Bangkok metropolis, a total of 1,133,296 voters, or 25.94 percent, from a total of 4,369,120 eligible voters, cast their votes: 775,821, or 68.46 percent, were valid; 90,923, or 8.02 percent, were invalid; and 266,552, or 23.52 per cent, were no-vote ballots. The EC announced that as many as 20.1 million out of 43.024 million eligible voters voted in 68 provinces where voting was not disrupted by protests, with 71.38 percent of those ballots valid, 12.05 percent invalid and 16.57 percent "no-vote". The EC vowed to discuss the 28 constituencies where candidates were prevented from registering prior to the polls and stated that it would consult with legal experts before arriving at a decision.

=== Arrest warrants for protest leaders ===
Warrants for arrest were approved by the Thai Criminal Court on 5 February 2014 for protest leaders, who insisted that the decision would not affect their campaign even though the Court found sufficient evidence that the leaders had violated the emergency decree imposed in Bangkok, Nonthaburi, and parts of Pathum Thani and Samut Prakan Provinces. According to the warrants, the police could arrest the 19 persons and detain them at Region 1 Border Patrol Police Headquarters at Khlong 5 in Pathum Thani's Thanyaburi District for no more than seven days. The warrants were valid for one year. The court was to be notified of any arrest within 48 hours.

DSI director-general Tarit Pengdith said that the CMPO had sent a team to negotiate with PDRC leaders for the opening of the Interior Ministry. The CMPO would then arrest the PDRC leaders if co-operation was not achieved by 15:00 on 5 February. As of 6 February, the PDRC leaders remained free. On 6 February, Suthep attempted to postpone his indictment on charges of premeditated and attempted murder for ordering, alongside former prime minister Abhisit Vejjajiva, the Centre for the Resolution of the Emergency Situation (CRES) to take action against UDD members in 2010, resulting in more than 90 deaths. The PDRC protest leader had been ordered to report to the prosecution office by 13 February 2014. CMPO head Chalerm informed the media on 6 February that he planned to disguise himself with a moustache, sun glasses, and a hat to arrest Suthep. Chalerm explained that Suthep's hideout was at the Dusit Thani Hotel.

On 7 February, Chalerm warned protesters who were at the Interior Ministry that if they did not leave within four days, 1,000 police officers and defence volunteers would redress the situation. The leading protester at the ministry, Khomsan Thongsri, responded with a commitment to allow workers to carry out their business while the demonstrators remained present at the site. Furthermore, as part of a case that was filed by PDRC co-leader Thaworn Senneam regarding the validity of the emergency decree, the Civil Court provided a 10 February 2014 deadline for the submission of statements by Yingluck, Chalerm, and police chief Adul Saengsingkaew. A ruling was expected on 12 February 2014. Additionally, National Security Council (NSC) Secretary Lieutenant General Paradon Patanatabutr informed the media that 12 teams were formed to enforce the arrest warrants for the 19 PDRC core leaders. He expressed confidence regarding the successful finalisation of the arrests.

The Thai Criminal Court rejected the DSI's submission to obtain warrants for the arrest of 13 PDRC leaders—Somkiat Pongpaiboon, Somsak Kosaisuk, Jitrapat Kridakorn, Sakonthi Pattiyakul, Sombat Thamrongthanyawong, Seri Wongmontha, Thanom Onketphol, Luang Pu Buddha Issara or Suvit Thongprasert, Sawit Kaewwan, Komsan Thongsiri, Suchart Srisang, Dr Rawi Matchamadol and Nopporn Muangthaen—on 24 February 2014. A PDRC lawyer explained that the court dismissed the DSI's request because the facts surrounding the PDRC protests had changed.

=== Compensatory voting ===
On 7 February 2014, a six-hour EC meeting was convened and EC member Somchai explained afterwards that if elections were to be held in the 28 constituencies in which candidates were not able to register for polls, a written royal decree from the government would be necessary. The meeting unanimously decided to seek such a decree. The EC believed that it could hold new elections in the five provinces of Rayong, Yala, Pattani, Narathiwat and Petchaburi without difficulty. However, Somchai stated: "We are not quite sure if new elections could be successfully held in Prachuap Khiri Khan and Satun which have 222 and 300 polling stations, respectively", but added that the EC would reassess the situation again on 11 February 2014. EC Secretary-General Puchong Nutrawong said the EC had scheduled candidacy registration for 4–8 March, 23 March for the advance election, and 30 March for the Senate election.

New election dates were announced by the EC on 12 February 2014 to create voting opportunities for those citizens who were unable to vote during the February elections. Advance voting was to be held on 20 April, while 27 April was the date for constituencies where elections could not take place on 2 February. Somchai, appointed the Election Commissioner, stated that the 27 April date applied to 28 constituencies in the south, and several in Bangkok. The PDRC disapproved of the new election dates.

According to the Wall Street Journal on 13 February 2014, the number of protesters dwindled since December 2013, from 150,000 to around 5,000 people. In his briefing with the media, Chalerm proposed that, following the next round of elections, the government should carry out changes within 18 months to allow for a new election process. Chalerm's statements followed a post by Yingluck on her Facebook page that indicated an openness to the involvement of a third-party broker to help resolve the political conflict.

=== Democrat Party's unsuccessful request for election invalidation ===
On 4 February 2014, the Democrat Party forwarded a request to the Constitutional Court for the invalidation of the election, as well as the dissolution of the Puea Thai Party and the disfranchisement of its executives. As part of their request, the Democrats identified the election as an attempt by the government to acquire administrative power by unconstitutional means, in accordance with section 68 of the constitution, the same section the Democrats had successfully invoked to request the invalidation of the constitutional amendment in November 2013. Section 68 prohibits an attempt to undermine the "democratic regime of government with the King as Head of State", or to acquire administrative power by constitutional means, and empowers the Constitutional Court to stop such an attempt, to dissolve any political party guilty of it and to disfranchise the executives of the dissolved party for five years. The Puea Thai Party filed a counter-request in response to the Democrat Party on 5 February, seeking the dissolution and disfranchisement of the latter's executives on the grounds of section 68. The Puea Thai Party spokesperson said that the Democrat Party's request to invalidate the election is an attempt to topple the government outside the rule of democracy. On 12 February 2014, the Constitutional Court dismissed the requests of the two political parties, citing both sets of claims as ill-grounded.

In an interview with the Bloomberg media company on 7 February 2014, Abhisit stated that he did not vote, explaining: "We are not saying no to elections, we are saying free and fair elections, and we have to build the circumstances to make sure that happens." The former prime minister further explained that he does not support all of the positions that the PDRC takes, but he does "understand the anger and frustration of people over corruption that is taking place, and the anger at intimidation of political opponents which has been going on for I don't know how many years now." In response to the reporter's question, "But why must the government step down when it was legitimately elected with the votes of 16 million people?", Abhisit replied:

They had that mandate, they ran the country for two years and then they betrayed the mandate, betrayed the trust of the people by trying to push through the amnesty bill, which they said they campaigned on during the election, but did not. And that led to mass protests. They dissolved the House and announced a caretaker government. The caretakers cannot pursue policy, so if the people are demanding somebody they can trust to oversee the election after some initial reforms take place, why can't the government make some sacrifices to ensure the country moves forward?

=== Retaking of public space ===
Operation Valentine was enacted on 14 February 2014, a traditional Buddhist holiday in Thailand, as police attempted to reclaim public space from the Students and People Network for Thailand's Reform protest group. Police first assembled at the Royal Plaza before moving onto the Misakawan Intersection to begin the operation. Tents were removed from Rachadamnoen Road on the Makkhawan Bridge, but the protesters had already relocated by the time the police arrived, so no violence occurred. Riot police also cleared a protest site that had been established at a major intersection near Government House and faced no resistance from protesters. Chalerm Yubamrung, chief of the government's special security operations, explained to the media that the operation is an indication of the caretaker government's response to the protest movement. Chalerm explained: "We urge the protesters to go home. If they don't listen, we will have to take further action. We can't let this happen. Our country can't function like this." Police refrained from taking action after a group of demonstrators returned to an intact protest site near Government House. About 1,000 protesters then gathered outside Bangkok police headquarters following the operation.

On the evening of 14 February, Suthep said in a speech that he refused to engage in a discussion with Yingluck, regardless of the presence of a neutral third party, citing previous experience that undermined his confidence in the caretaker prime minister's ability to think for herself. "I am not that crazy to talk with a puppet with someone [Thaksin] pulling the strings from behind."

On the morning of 18 February, nine police companies succeeded in retaking the Energy Ministry site and arrested more than 140 protesters after the protest group refused to leave the area. As the police continued to reclaim five protest sites, the situation deteriorated into violence at the Phan Fah Bridge protest site on Ratchadamnoen Klang Avenue. Protesters resisted police orders by sitting down on the road and praying. Police advanced with little violence and later commenced knocking down a stage and tents. The situation worsened when a growing numbers of protesters obstructed the officers. Police deployed tear gas and rubber bullets to disperse them. As the police moved forward, they were attacked by bombs and gunshots. Police responded with live ammunition, then retreated. A BBC video clip clearly showed a grenade was thrown at police lines from the group of protesters.

As of 19 February 2014, five deaths were registered—one police officer and four civilians—and at least 64 people were injured from the Phan Fah Bridge conflict. A BBC report, published on 18 February, stated that the government announced its intent to reclaim all occupied sites by the end of 23 February 2014.

The Southeast Asian Regional Office for the United Nations Office of the High Commissioner for Human Rights (OHCHR) denounced the protest violence in an official press statement that was released on 21 February 2014:

OHCHR calls on anti and pro-government sides to disassociate themselves from armed groups, and refrain from any form of violence. OHCHR calls on leaders of both sides and security forces to ensure the safety of those genuinely engaging in peaceful demonstrations, and to make sure that all sides strictly comply with the law. OHCHR further calls upon the authorities to carry out a prompt, full and impartial investigation to establish the facts and to ensure accountability for this and other similar violence incidents that have occurred over the past months.

Further violence, deaths, and injuries occurred on 22 and 23 February 2014 at two separate PDRC protest sites in Bangkok and the town of Trat, about 300 km (186 mi) southeast of the Thai capital. In Bangkok, a rally on 23 February occurred outside a large shopping mall on Ratchadamri Road and it was reported that the explosion of a 40mm grenade caused the death of three people, two children and a woman. A male tuk-tuk driver was arrested following the incident.

Gunfire and grenades were responsible for one death and 34 injuries in Trat on the evening of 22 February. Following the incidents of 22 and 23 February 2014, PDRC protesters in Bangkok attempted to hinder the activity of the Shinawatra family's businesses on 24 February, at the Customs Department in Khlong Toey, the Voice TV station, and various ministries.

=== Closure of rally sites ===
On the evening of 28 February, Suthep announced the closure of the rally sites at Prathum Wan, Ratchaprasong, Silom, and Asoke on 2 March 2014, and apologised to those people inconvenienced by the Bangkok occupation. The PDRC relocated to Lumphini Park, marking the end of the "Bangkok Shutdown", where the PDRC rally stage was established. Chaeng Watthana is the only other remaining rally stage, overseen by a senior monk who said: "I will not dismantle or move it [the stage] anywhere" following Suthep's announcement. According to Suthep, from 3 March onwards, boycotts and disruption of the Shinawatra family's business interests will be the primary focus of the anti-government protest movement.

A new leader of the pro-government Red Shirt movement was appointed on 15 March 2014 to replace Tida Tawornseth, at a rally of 10,000 supporters in Ayutthaya, north of Bangkok. Former MP Jatuporn Prompan, who remained involved with legal proceedings that date back to the 2010 political crisis, assumed the leadership position and spoke with the AFP news agency on the following day. The new leader declared that a "big fight" is required in the future, but any Red Shirt action will be "peaceful". Jatuporn referenced the failed anti-government actions in 2006, 2007, and 2008, and stated that the Suthep-led movement "cannot achieve success".

On 20 March 2014, the president of the Thai Farmers body informed the media that farmers from numerous provinces will convene at the Ministry of Commerce to implore the government to stand down. President Ravi Roongreung explained that the government's inefficient handling of farming issues was the primary reason for the protest action.

=== Ombudsman's request for election invalidation ===
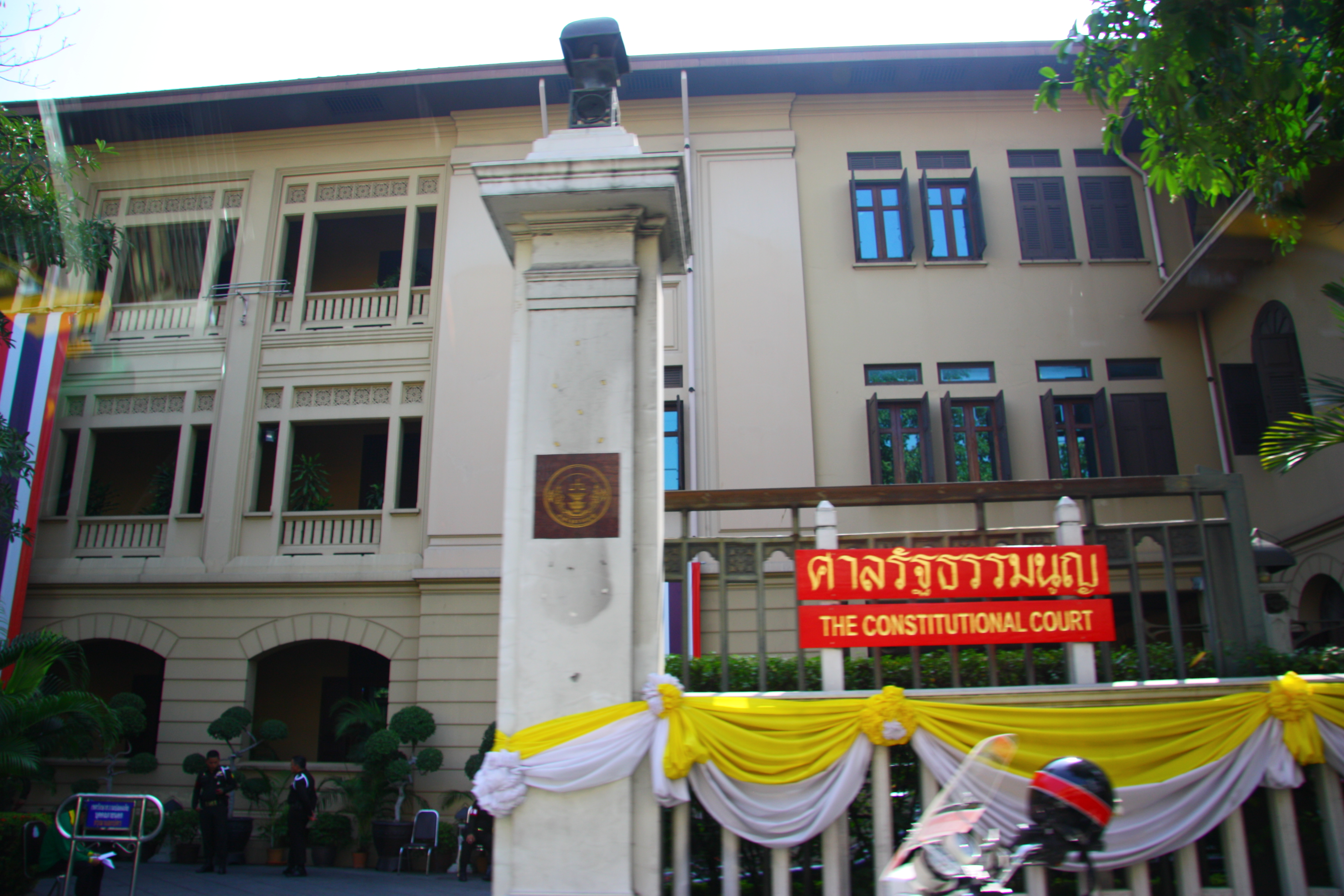
Former seat of the Constitutional Court at Lord Rattanathibet's Mansion on Phahurat Road.

The ombudsman also sought to have the general election of 2 February 2014 invalidated following advice from Thammasat University journalism law lecturer Kittipong Kamolthammawong. The ombudsman's authority concerns constitutionality of law, rather than election-related matters. In light of the limitation of his authority, the ombudsman then filed a request on 6 March 2014 for the Constitutional Court to decide if the royal decree, whereby the House of Representatives was dissolved, was unconstitutional.

On 21 March 2014, the Constitutional Court, by six votes to three, ruled that the royal decree was contrary to the constitution—insofar as it affected the election—when the general election, scheduled for 2 February 2014, could not be completed on that day throughout Thailand. The constitution stipulates that only a royal decree can dissolve the House of Representatives and it must also order a general election to be held on the same day nationwide, within 45 days of the dissolution. According to the court, at the point that the royal decree was deemed unconstitutional, the election also became unconstitutional as a consequence.

The Constitutional Court decision received heavy criticism from academic sectors and the Pheu Thai Party. Thammasat University public law lecturer Piyabutr Saengkanokkul commented that nothing in the royal decree was contrary to the constitution, as it did not fail to comply with the requirements of the constitution mentioned by the court. Chulalongkorn University constitutional law lecturer Kanin Boonsuwan questioned the logic of the decision, because the activity that the constitution required of the decree could not be completed due to hindrance from the anti-government protesters. Chulalongkorn University political science lecturer Pornson Liengboonlertchai added that a law is deemed unconstitutional when its contents are contrary to the constitution, not when it is prevented from being implemented according to the constitution. Legal scholar Verapat Pariyawong noted that the court invalidated the election because it was not completed within one day, but the court refrained from considering why it could not be completed.

Political analyst Kan Yuenyong said, "independent agencies are being quite obvious that they want to remove her [Yingluck] and her entire cabinet to create a power vacuum, claim that elections can't be held and then nominate a prime minister of their choice". Chiang Mai University law lecturer Somchai Preecha-silapakul said he was grieved by the decision and described it as a "constitutional coup". Former judge and former EC member Sodsri Sattayatham criticised the court for freezing the country and encouraged people to vote in the new election to "bring back democracy".

The Pheu Thai Party lamented the decision, stating that the country had lost an opportunity to move on and that the court had established an "infamous standard" by which an entire election can be overturned because of disruptions at some polling stations. Opposition MP Chuwit Kamolvisit issued a similar statement: "[The court has set] a standard that if you want to overturn an election, you just find someones to block a few polling stations....Just do this and you can make the whole election void."

On 21 March, a group of students using the slogan "Respect My Future" gathered at the Democracy Monument and covered it with black cloth to mourn for democracy. Another group launched a campaign called "Respect My Vote" in front of Lord Rattanathibet's Mansion, the Constitutional Court's former seat, with a view to demanding the resignation of the Constitutional Court judges on the grounds that they "devalued the people's votes". Ceremonies were held in Benchasiri Park, Bangkok, featuring floating black balloons and black candles, to bid farewell to democracy and deplore the court. Pheu Thai Party members said they would dress in black for six days in mourning for the six judges who resolved to invalidate the election, while medical officers in Chiang Mai Province also donned black clothing.

The Democrat Party's Ongart Clampaiboon that Pheu Thai should respect the court ruling, and that the next election should not be too early or it might be invalid again. One of the PDRC's co-speakers, Ekkanut, stated immediately after the ruling that PDRC respected the ruling and that Yingluck's government was "stubborn" about finishing the election process while it was not yet ready. He added that this might be a good chance for everyone to co-operate on reform before election. Suthep declined to make any comment on the ruling.

Anti-government protesters applauded the decision and vowed to disrupt new elections until an unelected people's council is achieved.

=== Continued protests and violence ===
Cases of intimidation, violence and criminal activities, committed by PDRC guards and supporters, continued. Police arrested in Surat Thani, Suthep's hometown, a man who confessed to being paid by the PDRC to shoot at pro-government Red Shirt protesters the day before the election at Lak Si, leading to seven people injured and one man paralysed. The "popcorn gunman", who fired an M16 rifle, also admitted that a PDRC guard leader provided him with the weapon. Warrants were issued by the court for the arrest of Issara Somchai, a former Democrat MP from Ubon Ratchathani and PDRC leader, and five PDRC security guards. Issara was accused of ordering his guards to detain, beat, and kill a civilian after they found him with Red Shirt supporters cards. The man was allegedly detained for five days, beaten, tied up and thrown into the Bang Pakong River by anti-government protest guards. A PDRC supporter known as "little Saddam", who was photographed trying to strangle a man who had tried to vote, was also sought.

Pro-government demonstrators from the People's Radio for Democracy Group (PRDG), a faction of the UDD, rallied at the National Anti-Corruption Commission office on 24 March 2014. Four members of the PRDG proceeded to assault a Buddhist monk named Phra Prat, who received minor injuries. According to Phra Prat, he saw protesters assaulting another man, so he complained to the protesters. One of the PRDG attackers claimed that Phra Prat was not a real monk and was going to attack her with his cane. She also blamed the monk for scolding them in the first place.

On 29 March 2014, a group of anti-government protesters from the People's Democratic Reform Committee (PDRC) were led by Suthep on a march around Bangkok streets, from Lumpini Park to the Royal Plaza and parliament. The march eventually returned to Lumpini Park to affirm its stance that reforms must be carried out before a general election is undertaken. While 53 political parties called for a fresh election to be held within 45–60 days, the Democrat Party echoed Suthep's position: the ruling Pheu Thai Party would use the power it won in a fresh election to pass illegitimate laws. The party did not elaborate on its planned involvement in the next election.

At the PDRC rally at Lumpini Park on 5 April 2014, Suthep outlined his strategies in the campaign to remove Yingluck from her role as caretaker. He called on all PDRC local networks to gather lists of their members throughout Thailand and "wait for the day of battle", further explaining that he would lead "a prolonged fight" that will last "for at least 15 days". The outcome of two events were presented as critical to the course of Suthep's future actions: the NACC's ruling on Yingluck and the verdict by the Constitutional Court on whether Yinluck violated the 2007 Constitution. In the event of a guilty finding by the NACC, Suthep asked his supporters to await further instructions. However, if the Constitutional Court ruled against Yinluck, Suthep called for an immediate mass mobilisation so that he could assume the role of "sovereign body" to enact a new charter, akin to the military dictators of the 1960s. Suthep stated as a reassurance: "[I] will be able to order anyone to be executed by firing squad, but I will only freeze assets". If he assumed a ruling position, Suthep stated that he planned to appoint a prime minister and cabinet members at his discretion, followed by a request for approval from Thailand's king, so that he might appoint a National Legislative Assembly and "People's Council"—two unelected legislative bodies—to engage in national "reforms". Suthep expressed a commitment to return power to the Thai people following the implementation of the reforms, but spoke of further street-based protests if his appointed government failed to implement the reforms dictated by the PDRC.

On 25 April 2014 a soldier was removing a barrier placed near the anti-government protest site on Chaeng Watthana when protest guards opened fire at him. The attack ended after the guards viewed his military identification card.

=== Request for removal of Yingluck from office ===
Over two years prior, on 30 September 2011, the Office of the Prime Minister (OPM) transferred Thawin Pliansri from the office of Secretary General of the National Security Council (NSC) to the office of Prime Minister Advisor. Police General Wichian Photphosri, then Commissioner General of the Royal Thai Police (RTP), was appointed as the NSC Secretary General instead, and Police General Priewpan Damapong, elder brother of Thaksin's former wife Potjaman Shinawatra, was appointed as the new RTP Commissioner General. Thawin requested an administrative court to revoke the transfer. The Supreme Administrative Court delivered a final judgment on 7 March 2014 that the transfer was legal, but was unreasonable because it did not appear that Thawin had carried out his duties ineffectively or failed to abide by the policy of the government. The court ordered the OPM to transfer Thawin back to his former office within 45 days. The OPM announced the transfer on 28 April 2014, retroactive to 30 September 2011.

Appointed Senator Paiboon Nititawan then requested the Constitutional Court to remove Yingluck from office, citing that the transfer of Thawin was the exercise of power to interfere with governmental affairs in favour of Yingluck's family or the Pheu Thai Party. The constitution prohibits a representative, senator or minister from, for his or her own sake or for the sake of his or her political party, interfering with regular government affairs, including the transfer, appointment, promotion, demotion, or removal of governmental officers.

On 3 April 2014, the Constitutional Court agreed to address the case and ordered Yingluck to reply within 15 days. Yingluck replied:

1. The transfer was not interference, but the usual exercise of authority which she is legally empowered to exercise.
2. The transfer was not done for the purpose of allowing Priewpan to become the new RTP Commissioner General. The candidates to the office were not selected by her.
3. Even though Priewpan is the elder brother of Potjaman, Potjaman and Thaksin had already divorced.
4. She cannot be removed from office any longer because she had already vacated it when the House of Representatives was dissolved. The constitution prescribes that the council of ministers vacates office upon dissolution of the House of Representatives, but it shall continue to function until a new council is formed.

The final hearing was held on 6 May 2014. The court rendered its decision on 7 May 2014, stating that Yingluck could still be removed from office as her office exists until a new council of ministers is formed. The court decided that the transfer of Thawin involved her personal interest, saying:

[Since] Police General Priewpan is the maternal [great] uncle of the grandchildren of the Respondent, he could be deemed a relative of the Respondent. It is therefore reasonable to believe that the acts of the Respondent were not for the sake of the Nation and its people, but were done with a concealed or hidden intention to favour the Respondent herself or her partisans.

The court then unanimously removed her from office. It also removed nine other ministers voting in favour of the transfer. These ministers were Anudith Nakornthap (Minister of Information and Communication Technology), Chalerm Yubamrung (Minister of Labour), Kittiratt Na-Ranong (Deputy Prime Minister and Minister of Finance), Plodprasop Suraswadi (Deputy Prime Minister), Police General Pracha Promnok (Minister of Justice), Santi Prompat (Minister attached to the OPM), Siriwat Kajornprasart (Deputy Minister of Agriculture and Cooperatives), Surapong Tovichakchaikul (Deputy Prime Minister and Minister of Foreign Affairs) and General Yuttasak Sasiprapa (Deputy Minister of Defence).

The remaining ministers selected Niwatthamrong Boonsongpaisan (Deputy Prime Minister and Minister Commerce) to act as caretaker prime minister in place of Yingluck.

Tight security was placed around court precincts during the televised pronouncement of the decision and the judges left the court immediately after the pronouncement. The court appeared to overturn its own precedent. On 5 February 2014, it dismissed a similar petition against Abhisit Vejjajiva, citing that he had already vacated office upon dissolution of the House of Representatives. The New York Times also noted that the court reached the decision with "unusual speed" as it was delivered just one day after Yingluck gave evidence to the court, while The Wall Street Journal reported that the grounds for which Yingluck was removed were "relatively obscure".

After hearing the decision, Yingluck held a press conference during which she denied all the accusations. The pro-government Red Shirt faction leaders described the decision as a "judicial coup" and said they will hold a mass rally to protest her removal on 10 May 2014, prompting the Constitutional Court to order its own holiday from 8–13 May 2014.

=== Post Yingluck's removal ===
PDRC leader Suthep launched his "final battle" with media intimidation. On 9 May at 09:09, protesters marched to the buildings of Channels 3, 5, 7, 9 and NBT, where they stayed overnight to make sure the stations did not deviate from PDRC-approved coverage. According to Suthep, these media agencies are "mouthpieces" of the government and must be convinced to refrain from broadcasting any more pro-government "propaganda". They must not report the news on behalf of the tyrants any longer, because it distorts the truth, adding that he intended to ask for co-operation from these stations to broadcast his speech once "victory" is achieved.

The Thai Journalists Association, the Thai Broadcast Journalists Association, and human rights groups condemned the PDRC move. The intimidation campaign occurred previously during the Bangkok Shutdown campaign.

Meanwhile, those led by Luang Phu Buddha Issara went to CMPO headquarters, where violence erupted between protesters and police. Protesters dismantled barricades and demanded that CMPO send out a representative to talk to them within five minutes. When the five minutes had passed, the protesters broke in, causing police to fire tear gas and water cannons at them. The protesters withdrew. The violence resulted in four protesters injured, included the leader himself.

The following day, after negotiations with Col Sombat Thanyawan, deputy commander of the Cavalry Centre who supervised security at Government House, Suthep and the PDRC were granted permission to enter the Santi Maitree building. The Santi Maitree is the building at Government House where the cabinet ministers' offices are located. The building was to be used as an office and meeting place for the PDRC.

The UDD staged a rally at Aksa Road on 10 May to show support for the recently removed Yingluck and other cabinet members. "I plead with the president of the Supreme Court, which is one of the three pillars of democracy, to reconsider thoroughly the demands by Mr Suthep and the subsequent proposal made by the not-yet-validly nominated Senate speaker to hold a meeting and appoint a new prime minister," said Jatuporn Prompan, leader of the UDD. The Red Shirt leader warned that any attempt by the Supreme Court and the Senate to discuss "unlawful" demands for an interim government could steer Thailand toward a civil war.

The PDRC relocated their main rally site from Lumphini Park to Ratchadamnoen Nok Avenue, not far from Government House on 11 May. A clean up operation took place in Lumphini Park two days later.

=== Coup d'état ===
On 20 May 2014, the Royal Thai Army intervened by declaring martial law nationwide and establishing a military command to resolve the situation. The caretaker government stated that the army never sought its opinion on the martial law declaration. The army insisted that the move was not a coup d'état and the government remained in office.

On the evening of 22 May 2014, the army formally staged a coup against the caretaker government and formed a junta called National Peace and Order Maintaining Council (NPOMC) to govern the country. On 21 August 2014 army chief General Prayut Chan-o-cha was appointed prime minister by a legislature he had handpicked.

== Rice-pledge scheme crisis ==
Concurrent to the 2013–2014 political crisis in Thailand, the rice-pledge scheme has been a significant issue for the caretaker government. Following the dissolution of parliament on 9 December 2013, Yingluck and her Cabinet neglected to approve a renewed budget for the rice pledge. As of 31 January 2014, the caretaker government had not only defaulted on the payments that are owed to the nation's rice farmers as part of the scheme, but caretaker Finance Minister Kittiratt Na Ranong does not have access to the Bt130 billion that is required to resolve the situation. In its reduced "caretaker" capacity, the Finance Ministry is constitutionally barred from borrowing money that would create obligations for the next government.

The sum of Bt130 billion has been owed to the nation's rice farmers since October 2013 and, as of 31 January 2014, more than 200 farmers have sought the help of the Lawyers' Council with representation in a class action against the government. While the rice farmers of Thailand are the lowest class in the Thai social hierarchy, they are also traditionally a key component of the Pheu Thai Party's political base. As of 31 January 2014, rice farmers, predominantly from the North and Central regions, have blocked highways to protest against the government and have also stated that they may travel to Bangkok to join the anti-government protest. Many farmers are bankrupt as a result of the outstanding payments and at least three farmers under the scheme have committed suicide.

The Thai Ministry of Commerce announced on 4 February 2014 that China cancelled a contract to purchase more than a million tonnes of rice due to a continuing investigation of the Anti-Corruption Commission into a rice purchase policy administered by Yingluck. The protesting farmers announced that they would intensify their protest on 6 February 2014 by blocking all of Thailand's major roads, even though many farmers from the north of the country could not afford to participate. The protesting rice farmers—1.4 million farmers in total have been affected—are seeking compensation from the Bank for Agriculture and Agricultural Co-operatives (BAAC), as they believe that the bank can recoup the payment from the government at a later time; however, the BAAC has stated that it relies upon the government for funds. Additionally, a number of farmers from the Central provinces might travel to Bangkok and demand payment in front of the Commerce Ministry on 6 February.

Suthep announced to supporters in Silom on 6 February that one potential solution to the rice farmers predicament is to sell the government's 8 million-tonne stock of pledged rice; however, PDRC-organized protesters would need to forcibly enter secured warehouses to retrieve the rice. One of the PDRC core leaders stated that Suthep would embark on a public walk on 7 February to collect donations for the rice farmers. According to Rangsan Srivorasart, Permanent Secretary for Finance, on 7 February, a confidential plan involving Thailand's banks will ensure that the rice farmers will be paid through a Bt130 billion loan. Rangsan stated that several options existed to obtain the necessary funds.

In a statement to the media on 11 February, Yingluck stated that the government possessed the financial means to pay all outstanding debts to the nation's rice farmers and was adamant that the payments will be honoured at the stipulated prices. However, a Bangkok Post report, published on 12 February 2014, states that the National Anti-Corruption Commission (NACC) is expected to bring formal charges against Yingluck following the collation of evidence to substantiate a case regarding the rice scheme. NACC deputy secretary-general Witthaya Akhompitak said on 11 February that the NACC expects to press charges against the caretaker Prime Minister.

Witthaya explained that if the NACC panel accumulates enough evidence, Yingluck, who is also chairwoman of the National Rice Policy Committee, would be in violation of Section 157 of the Criminal Code for dereliction of duty and, if charged, will be permitted to present her case to the panel—the panel will then decide if the indictment of Yingluck is justified. The case dates back to mid-January 2014 and, if the case is taken to court, Yingluck would be required to step down from all official roles. Meanwhile, caretaker Commerce Minister Niwatthamrong Bunsongphaisan stated that a cabinet meeting held on 11 February approved a central budget of Bt712 million to pay a total of 3,921 undocumented farmers under the rice scheme and the budget will be forwarded to the EC for endorsement between 11 and 14 February 2014.

On the evening of 12 February, Thai Rice Association president Prasit Boonchoey warned that around 50,000 rice farmers to oust the caretaker government due to the outstanding payments. Prasit spoke on one of the PDRC protest stages, confirming that he had spoken with other farmer leaders from the western, lower northern, and upper central regions in regard to escalating the protest action. On the morning of 13 February, another group of farmers were escorted by lawyers from the Lawyers Association of Thailand to file legal charges against the caretaker government for fraudulent conduct. On the evening of 14 February, farmer leader Dhaicharn Mata warned Yingluck that the consequences will be "unpredictable and uncontrollable" if the farmers demands are not met.

Rice farmers used a truck to overcome razor wire barricades at one of Yingluck's temporary offices in the Chaeng Wattana area. The caretaker prime minister refused to meet with the farmers, but government officials identified the dissolution of parliament in December 2013 as the cause of the payment delay. Caretaker Finance Minister Kittiratt Na-Ranong informed the media that Bt2 billion had already been paid and a further Bt3.39 billion is owed to the farmers. He said the government will pay the remainder of the debt through the state-owned agricultural bank: "Considering the (bank's) capacity in handling daily payments, it is expected that all payments will be made within six to eight weeks."

On 18 February 2014, Yingluck delivered a speech to respond to the desperation of the rice farmers and detailed how the issue will be resolved. Yingluck also explained that the anti-government protest movement has acted as an obstacle to the successful continuation of the scheme, which she claimed had been functional during its first two years of existence prior to the 2013–2014 political crisis. Yingluck affirmed that, regardless of the obstacles, she would "persist in fighting for the farmers"; however, the caretaker prime minister called upon the co-operation of Thailand's banks, whereby loans would be granted to the Bank of Agriculture and Agricultural Cooperatives (BAAC) for the payment of rice farmers:

With a solid guarantee under the law, there are no reasons for the banks and their unions to fear that their money would be used in the wrong way. The government is responsible for every baht. Moreover, the country's financial institutions are very strong with high liquidity. They can comfortably provide loans to help farmers without taking too much risk.

Yingluck further stated that the BAAC will extend the debt repayment time by six months due to the hardships endured by the farmers, in addition to increasing the loan limit for the upcoming crop season. The speech was telecast nationwide by the Television Pool of Thailand.

However, also on 18 February, the National Anti-Corruption Commission released a statement charging Yingluck with improperly handling the government's rice subsidy scheme. The Commission states that the scheme involved the government's purchase of farmers' crops for prices up to 50 per cent higher than global prices over a two-year period. The caretaker prime minister received a summons to face the Commission's charges on 27 February 2014, and her impeachment and removal from official duties is one potential outcome.

EC member Somchai Srisutthiyakorn announced on 4 March 2014 that the caretaker government received the approval of the EC to pay the rice farmers who joined the rice-pledging scheme with Bt20 billion from the nation's central fund. The money will be dispensed as a loan to the government, which will use the revenue from rice sales to repay the amount by 31 May 2014.

Led by monk Phra Buddha Issara, a group of farmers dumped rice at the Government Lottery Office (GLO) on 22 March 2014, leading to the closure of the office for the day. The monk demanded that the GLO use lottery sale funds to purchase 100 tonnes of rice from farmers and stated that the Office needs to pay the farmers at least THB12,000 for each tonne of rice.

== Impact of political crisis ==
On 23 December 2013, the Thai baht dropped to a three-year low due to the political unrest in the preceding months. According to Bloomberg News, the Thai currency lost 4.6 percent over November and December, while the main stock index also dropped (9.1 percent). A chief Japanese trader on emerging Asian markets told Bloomberg News: "There is no reason to buy the baht or Thai assets while the protests continue."

In terms of tourism, Thailand's Association of Domestic Travel reported a decrease of US$125 million worth of tourist revenue around Christmas and New Year compared to the same period in 2012. The Thai-Chinese Tourism Alliance Association has projected that, for Q1 2014, Chinese arrivals are expected to drop 60 per cent from 900,000 compared with the same period in 2013 (in 2013, Chinese nationals were responsible for the highest level of tourism in Thailand). On 6 January, Singapore Airlines stated that it will cancel 19 flights due to the political situation in Bangkok, while travel agencies have experienced a decline in patronage.

The Bank of Thailand reported on the second day of the anti-government Operation, 14 January 2014, that 135 different bank branches had been affected. It said 36 branches announced full day closure, including three Bangkok Bank branches, 17 Krungthai branches and five Siam Commercial branches, while 99 others closed ahead of regular business hours, including 72 Thai Military branches and 10 CIMB branches.

According to data compiled by Thailand's Financial Ministry, Bloomberg L.P. and the Stock Exchange of Thailand, foreign investors have withdrawn US$3 billion (nearly THB100 billion) from Thai stocks since protests began on 31 October 2013. Analysts are commenting on the benefits being reaped by Thailand's neighbouring countries and the Thai Stock Exchange has traced approximately THB6.3 billion that has moved to Indonesian shares.

On 23 January 2014, Tourism and Sports Minister Somsak Phurisisak stated that the total number of visitors to Thailand will drop to one million in January 2014, half of the usual tourist population for the month. A representative from Barclay's, a UK multinational banking and financial services company, reiterated the repetitive history of the protest movement and further explained: "It's not the first time this has happened. What's damaging is perceptions, investment and tourism. It's all reversible at the moment, but as time goes by some of it will become permanent."

On 27 January 2014, the Erawan Center, an emergency medical service unit of the Bangkok Metropolitan Administration (BMA), announced that 10 deaths had occurred during the anti-government protests, while 571 injuries had been documented. An increase in tension has been identified in the lead-up to 2 February elections.

According to a 12 February media report, Bangkok businesses were hopeful for a resolution to the political unrest, as the financial impact had become more problematic. CentralWorld, one of Southeast Asia's largest shopping plazas, reported that customer traffic was down 20 per cent from 2013, Japanese department store operator Isetan's Bangkok location had been closing an hour earlier, the Ratchaprasong district's accommodation venues experienced a 60 per cent decline in patronage, and only 5,000 tourists were frequenting popular foreign backpacker destination Khaosan Road on a daily basis, representing a 50 per cent drop. On the same date, the central Bank of Thailand downgraded its GDP growth projection for 2014 from 4 per cent to 3 per cent.

An economic data report published on 17 February stated that GDP increased 0.6 per cent in the last three months of 2013, the country's lowest level of growth since the first quarter of 2012. The data also showed that the nation's currency has weakened by 4 per cent since the commencement of the protests. Bank of Thailand spokeswoman Roong Mallikamas stated that the monetary policy as of 17 February is sufficient to accommodate the nation's needs.

On 13 April 2014, Thitinan Pongsudhirak, a Thai academic based at Chulalongkorn University's Institute of Security and International Studies in Bangkok, assessed the 2014 political crisis for the East Asia Forum, a joint initiative of the East Asian Bureau of Economic Research (EABER) and the South Asian Bureau of Economic Research (SABER). Thitinan writes that "Yingluck's days are numbered" and foresees two potential outcomes for Thailand: "If it is a government that includes both sides of the divide, Thailand may be able to navigate a way out. But if it is a partisan anti-Thaksin interim government, more tumult and turmoil can be expected." The academic expresses his support for a democratic process, as he concludes with the statement, "Thais must realise that the starting point for any democracy is the will of the majority and that autocratic rule in Thailand ultimately cannot last."

The private Thai think tank Kasikorn Research Center (KResearch) reported in mid-April 2014 that Thailand was at risk of entering into a recessionary period due to the ongoing political turmoil in the nation. The Center presented data that indicated an absence of growth in Thai exports during the first quarter of 2014, similar to the final quarter of 2013, while a minus growth of 1.8 percent continued beyond this period. The think tank predicted about 1.8 percent growth for Thailand's economy over 2014; however, Bangkok Bank executive vice-president Kobsak Pootrakool estimated an annual growth of around 2 to 3 percent, as well as an expansion of 5 to 7 percent in exports as a result of a recovering global economy.

The political crisis initially raised fears of a violent response from supporters of Thaksin, who felt disenfranchised after the governments they had elected in the prior five general elections were removed before completing their terms.

=== Legal sanctions ===
In 2016, Vivat Yodprasit, better known as the popcorn gunman, was sentenced to 37 years in prison for a murder that was linked to the crisis.

== See also ==
- 2005–06 Thai political crisis
- Public opinion of the 2006 Thai coup d'état
- 2008 Thai political crisis
- April 2009 Thai political unrest
- Cambodian–Thai border stand-off
- 2014 interim constitution of Thailand
- 2019 Thai general election
- List of protests in the 21st century
- Rubbish Collection Organization
