= Chaiwut Thanakamanusorn =

Thai politician

- ชัยวุฒิ ธนาคมานุสรณ์
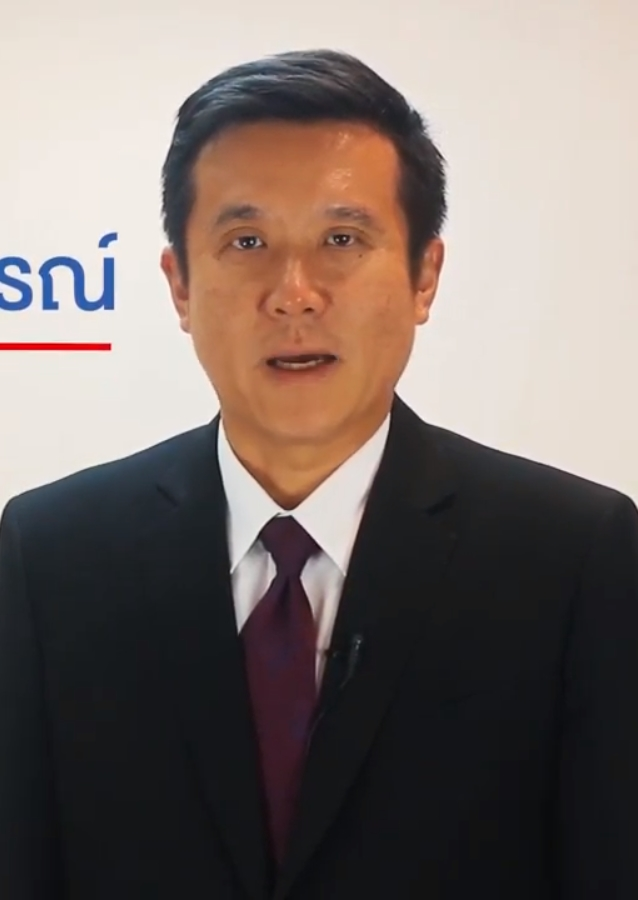

Minister of Digital Economy and Society
- In office 23 March 2021 – 1 September 2023
- Prime Minister: Prayut Chan-o-cha
- Preceded by: Puttipong Punnakanta
- Succeeded by: Prasert Jantararuangtong

Personal details
- Born: 2 November 1971 (age 54) Sing Buri, Thailand
- Party: Rak Chart party
- Other political affiliations: Chart Thai; Palang Pracharath (Until 2025)
- Spouse: Kankanit Haewsantati (divorced)
- Education: Chulalongkorn University; University of Southern California
- Profession: Politician

Chaiwut Thanakamanusorn (Thai: ชัยวุฒิ ธนาคมานุสรณ์, RTGS: Chaiwut Thanakhamanuson; born 2 November 1971) is a Thai politician. He served as Minister of Digital Economy and Society in the second cabinet of Prime Minister Prayut Chan-o-cha. He replaced Puttipong Punnakanta who was removed from office after being found guilty of insurrection during protests that led to the 2014 coup d'état.

== Early life and education ==
Chaiwut was born on 2 November 1971 in Bang Phutsa Sub-district, Mueang Sing Buri District, Singburi Province. Chaiwut graduated a high school education from Triam Udom Suksa School and graduated with a bachelor's degree in engineering from Chulalongkorn University and then Master of the Engineering from University of Southern California, USA and Master of Arts in Economics from Chulalongkorn University.

== Careers ==
Chaiwut used to be a lecturer in the Faculty of Business Administration at Rangsit University and used to work at Kasikorn Bank. He worked as an Engineer at Gulf JP Company Limited and was the Executive Director of Community Relations, Gulf Energy Development Public Company.

During his tenure as Digital economy minister, in 2023, personal data of 55 million Thais were leaked to hackers, to which he responded by blocking the website and threatening to hunt them down.

== Royal decorations ==
- 2020 – Knight Grand Cordon (Special Class) of The Most Exalted Order of the White Elephant
- 2008 – Knight Grand Cordon (Special Class) of The Most Noble Order of the Crown of Thailand

Political offices
Preceded by Puttipong Punnakanta	Minister of Digital Economy and Society; 2021–present	Incumbent
