= Prasert Jantararuangtong =

Thai politician

- ประเสริฐ จันทรรวงทอง
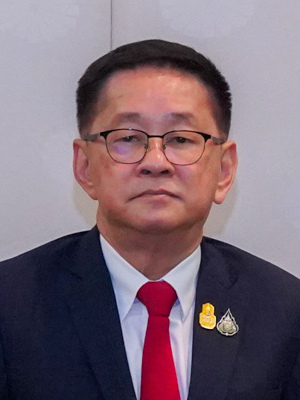

Deputy Prime Minister of Thailand
- In office 3 September 2024 – 19 September 2025
- Prime Minister: Paetongtarn Shinawatra: Suriya Juangroongruangkit (acting) Phumtham Wechayachai (acting)

Minister of Education
- Incumbent
- Assumed office 30 March 2026
- Prime Minister: Anutin Charnvirakul
- Preceded by: Narumon Pinyosinwat

Minister of Digital Economy and Society
- In office 1 September 2023 – 19 September 2025
- Prime Minister: Srettha Thavisin Paetongtarn Shinawatra: Suriya Juangroongruangkit (acting) Phumtham Wechayachai (acting)
- Preceded by: Chaiwut Thanakamanusorn
- Succeeded by: Chaichanok Chidchob

Deputy Minister of Transport
- In office 27 October 2012 – 30 June 2013
- Prime Minister: Yingluck Shinawatra
- Minister: Chadchart Sittipunt
- Preceded by: Chatch Kuldilok; Chadchart Sittipunt
- Succeeded by: Pong Chivanant

Personal details
- Born: 1 April 1960 (age 66) Sikhio, Nakhon Ratchasima, Thailand
- Party: Pheu Thai Party (2008–present)
- Other political affiliations: Thai Rak Thai (2001–2007); People's Power (2007–2008)
- Spouse: Wipa Jantararuangtong
- Education: Kasetsart University (BS); National Institute of Development Administration (MPA)

Prasert Jantararuangtong (Thai: ประเสริฐ จันทรรวงทอง, RTGS: Prasoet Chanthararuangthong; born 1 April 1960) is a Thai politician, currently serving as Deputy Prime Minister of Thailand since 2024 and Minister of Digital Economy and Society since 2023.

== Biography ==
Prasert was born on 1 April 1960, in Sikhio district, Nakhon Ratchasima province. His nickname is "Kai." He completed his lower primary education at Mongkolkul Wittaya School and his upper primary education at Thai Wattana Pracharath School. He attended Amnuay Silpa School for lower secondary education and Bodindecha (Sing Singhaseni) School for upper secondary education.

He holds a Bachelor of Science degree in Economics and Business Administration from Kasetsart University and a Master of Public Administration from the National Institute of Development Administration (NIDA).

Prasert remains in the cabinet.despite previously facing a probe by the Department of Special Investigation (DSI) and being referred to the National Anti-Corruption Commission.

== Royal decorations ==
Prasert has received the following royal decorations in the Honours System of Thailand:

- 2011 – Knight Grand Cordon of the Most Exalted Order of the White Elephant
- 2008 – Knight Grand Cordon of The Most Noble Order of the Crown of Thailand
