= List of political families in Thailand =

Several political families have been active in the politics of Thailand. Names in bold indicate the individual was/is a Prime Minister of Thailand.

== A ==
=== Amornwiwat family ===
- Sompong Amornwiwat – Leader of the Opposition (2019–2021), Leader of the Pheu Thai Party (2019–2021), Deputy Prime Minister of Thailand (2008), Minister of Foreign Affairs (2008), Minister of Justice (2008), Minister of Industry (1992), Minister of Labour and Social Services (1998–1999), (1992)
  - Julapun Amornvivat, son of Sompong – Deputy Finance Minister (2023–present)

=== Aphaiwong family ===
- **Khuang Aphaiwong** – Member of the People's Party, Founder and Leader of the Democrat Party, 4th Prime Minister of Thailand (1944–1945, 1946, 1947–1948)
  - Lekha Aphaiwong, Khuang's wife – M.P. for Bangkok, the Democrat Party, Member of the Senate (1949–1951)
  - Chiat Aphaiwong, half-brother of Khuang – Prime Minister's Secretary-General (1945–1946)
  - Chavalit Aphaiwong, cousin of Khuang and Chiat – Secretary-General of the Democrat Party (1949–1951), M.P. for Phra Tabong Province, the Democrat Party, M.P. for Chonburi Province, the Democrat Party
  - Prayoon Aphaiwong, grandson of Khuang – the Democrat Party M.P. for Phibunsongkhram Province
    - Asawin Aphaiwong, Prayoon's son, and great-grandchild of Khuang – Secretary-General of the Thai Motherland Party, the Democrat Party candidate for Bangkok M.P., Founder of the Thais United National Development Party, Executive Committee Member of the New Politics Party
  - Tridao Aphaiwong Sukhum, great-grandchild of Khuang, and cousin of Asawin – the Bangkok Metropolitan Administration (BMA) Spokeswoman (2013–2017)
  - Phubet Aphaiwong, great-grandchild of Khuang, and cousin of Tridao and Asawin – the Democrat Party candidate for Bangkok M.P.

== B ==
=== Bantadtan family ===
- Banyat Bantadtan – Leader of the Opposition (2003–2005), Leader of the Democrat Party (2003–2005), Deputy Prime Minister of Thailand (2000), Minister of Interior (2000), Minister of Science and Technology (1986–1989), Minister to the Office of the Prime Minister (1983–1986)
  - Nutt Bantadtan, son of Banyat – Democrat Party M.P. for Bangkok

== C ==
=== Chanpitak family ===
- Vilas Chanpitak – M.P. for Bangkok with the Palang Dharma Party and the Democrat Party
  - Surun Chanpitak, brother of Vilas – the Democrat MPDC, Bangkok Yai District, M.P. for Bangkok, the Democrat Party

=== Charnvirakul family ===
- **Chavarat Charnvirakul** – Acting Prime Minister of Thailand (2008), Leader of the Bhumjaithai Party (2009–2012), Deputy Prime Minister of Thailand (2008), Minister of the Interior (2008–2011), Minister of Public Health (2008), Minister of Social Development and Human Security (2008)
  - **Anutin Charnvirakul**, son of Chavarat – 32nd Prime Minister of Thailand (2025–Present), Deputy Prime Minister of Thailand (2019–2025), Leader of the Bhumjaithai Party (2012–present), Member of the House of Representatives (2019–present), Minister of Interior (2023–2025), Minister of Public Health (2019–2023), Deputy Minister of Public Health (2005–2006) and (2004), Deputy Minister of Commerce (2004–2005)

=== Chidchob family ===
- Chai Chidchob – Speaker of the House of Representatives and President of the National Assembly of Thailand (2008–2011)
  - Newin Chidchob, son of Chai – Minister to the Office of the Prime Minister (2005–2006)
    - Chaichanok Chidchob, son of Newin, grandson of Chai – Secretary-General of the Bhumjaithai Party (2024–present), Member of the House of Representatives (2023–present)
  - Saksayam Chidchob, son of Chai – Minister of Transport (2019–2023)
  - Permpoon Chidchob, son of Chai – Minister of Education (2023–present)

=== Choonhavan family ===
- **Phin Choonhavan** – Prime Minister de facto of Thailand (1947), Deputy Prime Minister of Thailand (1951–1956), Minister of Agriculture (1953–1957), 15th Commander-in-chief of the Royal Thai Army (1948–1954)
  - **Chatichai Choonhavan**, son of Phin – 17th Prime Minister of Thailand (1988–1991), Deputy Prime Minister of Thailand (1986–1988), Minister of Industry (1976), Minister of Foreign Affairs (1975–1976)
    - Kraisak Choonhavan, son of Chatichai, grandson of Phin – Deputy Leader of the Democrat Party (2008–2011)
  - Pramarn Adireksarn, son-in-law of Phin and brother-in-law of Chatichai – Leader of the Opposition (1992–1994), (1983–1986), Deputy Prime Minister of Thailand (1980–1983), (1976), (1975–1976), Minister of Interior (1990–1991), (1988–1990), Minister of Industry (1990), Minister of Agriculture and Cooperatives (1976), Minister of Defence (1975–1976)
    - Pongpol Adireksarn, son of Pramarn – Deputy Prime Minister of Thailand (2001–2005), Minister to the Office of the Prime Minister (1995–1996), Minister of Foreign Affairs (1992)
    - Korn Dabbaransi, grandson of Phin, nephew of Chatichai – Deputy Prime Minister of Thailand (2002–2003), (1998–2000), (1996–1997), Minister of Science and Technology (2004–2005), Minister of Public Health (1998–2000), Minister of Industry (1996–1997), Minister to the Office of the Prime Minister (1988–1990)

=== Chuenglertsiri family ===
- Jermmas Chuenglertsiri – M.P. for Bangkok, the Democrat Party, the Democrat MPDC, Pom Prap Sattru Phai District
  - Ek Chuenglertsiri, Jermmas's husband – the Democrat Party's vote canvasser, the Democrat MPDC, Pom Prap Sattru Phai District
  - Nipapan Chuenglertsiri, daughter of Ek and Jermmas – the Democrat MPDC, Pom Prap Sattru Phai District

== J ==
=== Juangroongruangkit family ===
- Suriya Juangroongruangkit – Deputy Prime Minister of Thailand (2024–present), (2005–2006), Minister of Transport (2023–present), (2002–2005), Member of the House of Representatives (2023–2024), Minister of Industry (2019–2023), (2005–2006), (2001–2002), Deputy Minister of Industry (1998–1999)
  - Thanathorn Juangroongruangkit, Suriya's nephew – Leader of the Future Forward Party (2018–2020), Member of the House of Representatives (2019)
  - Pongkawin Juangroongruangkit, Suriya's nephew – Minister of Labour (2025–present)

== K ==
=== Kanchanachoosak family ===
- Orathai Thanajaro (née Kanchanachoosak) – M.P. for Bangkok with the Palang Dharma Party and the Thai Rak Thai Party party-list
  - Onanong Kanchanachoosak, Orathai's cousin – M.P. for Bangkok, the Democrat Party
  - Pinit Kanchanachoosak, brother of Onanong, and cousin of Orathai – the Democrat MPDC, Samphanthawong District

=== Keyuraphan family ===
- Sudarat Keyuraphan – M.P. for Bangkok with the Palang Dharma Party and the Thai Rak Thai Party party-list, the Thai Rak Thai Party candidate for Governor of Bangkok, Minister of Agriculture and Cooperatives (2005–2006), Minister of Public Health (2001–2005), Deputy Minister of the Interior (1996), Deputy Minister of Transport (1994–1995), Founder and Leader of the Thai Sang Thai Party
  - Sompon Keyuraphan, father of Sudarat – M.P. for Nakhon Ratchasima Province, M.P. party-list with the People's Power Party and the Puea Thai Party

=== Khunpluem family ===
- Somchai Khunpluem – Mayor of Saen Suk Municipality, Chonburi Province
  - Sontaya Kunplome, son of Somchai – Mayor of Pattaya City (2018–2022)
  - Wittaya Khunpluem, son of Somchai – President of the Chonburi Provincial Administration Organization
  - Itthiphol Khunpluem, son of Somchai – Minister of Culture (2019–2023), Mayor of Pattaya City (2008–2016)
  - Narongchai Khunpluem, son of Somchai – Mayor of Saen Suk Municipality, Chonburi Province

=== Kwanmuang family ===
- Aswin Kwanmuang – 16th Governor of Bangkok (2016–2022)
  - Pongsakorn Kwanmuang, son of Asawin – the Bangkok Metropolitan Administration (BMA) Spokesperson (2019–2022), the Democrat Party candidate for Bangkok M.P.

== L ==
=== Leekpai family ===
- **Chuan Leekpai** – Leader of the Democrat Party (1991–2003), Prime Minister of Thailand for two non-consecutive terms (1992–1995, 1997–2001)
  - Kit Leekpai, Chuan's brother – President of the Trang Provincial Administration Organization (PAO)
  - Surabot Leekpai, Chuan's son and Kit's nephew – the Democrat Party M.P. party-list
  - Thanompong Leekpai, nephew of Chuan and Kit, and cousin of Surabot – M.P. for Trang Province, the United Thai Nation Party

=== Limjaroenrat family ===
- Pita Limjaroenrat – Leader of the Move Forward Party (2020–2023), Member of the House of Representatives (2019–2024)
  - Pongsak Limjaroenrat, Pita's father – Adviser to the Minister of Agriculture and Cooperatives
  - Padung Limjaroenrat, Pita's uncle and Pongsak's brother – Secretary to the Interior Minister, Aide to Prime Minister Thaksin Shinawatra

== P ==
=== Pamornmontri family ===
- Prayoon Pamornmontri – Member of the People's Party, Member of the Seri Manangkhasila Party
  - Yuranunt Pamornmontri, son of Prayoon – M.P. for Bangkok, the Thai Rak Thai, the Pheu Thai Party candidate for Governor of Bangkok
  - Yodmanu Pamornmontri, son of Prayoon, brother of Yuranunt – the Chart Pattana Party candidate for Bangkok M.P.

=== Phibunsongkhram family ===
- **Plaek Phibunsongkhram** – 3rd Prime Minister of Thailand (1938–1944, 1948–1957), Supreme Commander of the Armed Forces (1940–1943), Commander-in-Chief of the Royal Thai Army (1938–1944, 1947–1948)
  - Nitya Pibulsonggram, son of Plaek – Minister of Foreign Affairs (2006–2008), Thai Ambassador to the United States (1996–2000)

=== Pitutecha family ===
- Sakhon Pitutecha – Headman of Bang But Sub-district, Ban Khai District, Rayong Province
  - Piya Pitutecha, son of Sakhon – M.P. for Rayong Province with the Chart Pattana Party and the Chart Thai Party, President of the Rayong Provincial Administration Organization
  - Thara Pitutecha, son of Sakhon, brother of Piya – M.P. for Rayong Province with the Thai Rak Thai Party and the Democrat Party
  - Srettha Pitutecha, son of Sakhon, brother of Piya and Thara – President of Rayong Provincial Administration Organization Council, Chairman of Bankhai United F.C.
  - Sathit Pitutecha, son of Sakhon, brother of Piya, Thara and Srettha – M.P. for Rayong Province, the Democrat Party, Deputy Minister of Public Health, Deputy Leader of The Democrat Party
  - Pasin Pitutecha, grandson of Sakhon, nephew of Piya, Thara, Srettha, Sathit – the Democrat Party candidate for Rayong Province M.P.
  - Chatchai Pitutecha, grandson of Sakhon, nephew of Piya, Thara, Srettha, Sathit, cousin of Pasin – the Democrat Party candidate for Rayong Province M.P.

=== Pramoj family ===
- **Seni Pramoj** – Member of Free Thai, 6th Prime Minister of Thailand (1945–1946, 1975, 1976), Leader of the Democrat Party (1968–1979)
- **Kukrit Pramoj**, brother of Seni – 13th Prime Minister of Thailand (1975–1976), Secretary-general of the Democrat Party (1946–1948), Founder and Leader of the Social Action Party
  - Seri Pramoj, son of Seni, nephew of Kukrit – M.P. for Bangkok, the Democrat Party, the Democrat Party candidate for Nakhon Pathom Province M.P.

=== Prompow family ===
- Thamanat Prompow – Minister of Agriculture and Cooperatives (2023–2024; 2025–present), Member of the House of Representatives (2019–present), Deputy Minister of Agriculture and Cooperatives (2019–2021)
  - Akara Prompow, brother of Thamanat – Deputy Minister of Agriculture and Cooperatives (2024–present)

=== Punnakanta family ===
- Pong Punnakanta – Minister of Transport (1958–1969), Minister of Industry (1969–1971)
  - Puttipong Punnakanta, grandson of Pong – M.P. for Bangkok, the Democrat Party, Government Spokesperson (2018–2019), Minister of Digital Economy and Society (2019–2021), Member of the Palang Pracharath Party, Member of the Bhumjaithai Party
  - Danuporn Punnakanta, grandson of Pong, brother of Puttipong – the Phue Thai Party M.P. party-list, the Phue Thai Party Spokesperson

== R ==
=== Rattakul family ===
- Bhichai Rattakul – Leader of the Democrat Party (1982–1991), Minister of Foreign Affairs (1975–1976), Deputy Prime Minister (1983–1990, 1997–2000), Speaker of the House of Representatives, and President of the National Assembly (2000)
  - Bhichit Rattakul, son of Bhichai – 12th Governor of Bangkok (1996–2000), Leader of the Thai Motherland Party (2000–2002)
  - Anatchai Rattakul, son of Bhichai, and brother of Bhichit, the Democrat Party candidate for Bangkok M.P., Senatorial Candidate for Bangkok

== S ==
=== Shinawatra family ===
- **Thaksin Shinawatra** – 23rd Prime Minister of Thailand (2001–2006)
  - **Yingluck Shinawatra**, sister of Thaksin – 28th Prime Minister of Thailand (2011–2014)
  - **Somchai Wongsawat**, brother-in-law of Thaksin and Yingluck – 26th Prime Minister of Thailand (2008)
    - Yodchanan Wongsawat, son of Somchai, nephew of Taksin – Pheu Thai candidate for Prime Minister of Thailand (2026)
  - **Paetongtarn Shinawatra**, daughter of Thaksin, niece of Yingluck – 31st Prime Minister of Thailand (2024–2025)

=== Silpa-archa family ===
- **Banharn Silpa-archa** – 21st Prime Minister of Thailand (1995–1996)
  - Chumpol Silpa-archa, brother of Banharn – Deputy Prime Minister of Thailand (2011–2013), Minister of Tourism and Sports (2008–2013), Minister of Education (1997–1998), Leader of the Chartthaipattana Party (2009–2013)
  - Varawut Silpa-archa, son of Banharn – Minister of Social Development and Human Security (2023–present), Leader of the Chartthaipattana Party (2022–present)
  - Kanchana Silpa-archa, daughter of Banharn – Leader of the Chartthaipattana Party (2018–2022), Deputy Minister of Education (1999–2001)

=== Sirilatthayakorn family ===
- Itthi Sirilatthayakorn – Deputy Minister of Agriculture and Cooperatives (2024–2025)
  - Atthakorn Sirilatthayakorn, son of Itthi – Deputy Minister of Agriculture and Cooperatives (2024–2025)

=== Somchai family ===
- Issara Somchai – Minister of Social Development and Human Security (2009–2011), M.P. for Ubon Ratchathani Province, the Democrat Party
  - Boonthida Somchai, daughter of Issara – M.P. for Ubon Ratchathani Province with the Democrat Party and the Bhumjaithai Party.

=== Srivikorn family ===
- Chalermpan Srivikorn – Deputy Prime Minister (1990–1991), Secretary-general of Solidarity Party (1989–1991), Secretary-general of the Democrat Party (1979), Minister of Industry (1979)
  - Pimol Srivikorn, son of Chalermpan – M.P. for Bangkok, the Thai Rak Thai Party
  - Taya Teepsuwan (née Srivikorn), daughter of Chalermpan, sister of Pimol – Bangkok Deputy Governor, Member of the Democrat Party
    - Nataphol Teepsuwan, husband of Taya, son-in-law of Chalermpan – M.P. for Bangkok, the Democrat Party, Director of the Democrat Party, Minister of Education (2019–2021), Member of the Palang Pracharath Party

=== Sundaravej family ===
- **Samak Sundaravej** – 25th Prime Minister of Thailand (2008), Leader of the People's Power Party (2007–2008), 13th Governor of Bangkok (2000–2004), Founder and Leader of the Thai Citizen Party (1979–2001)
  - Sumitr Sundaravej, Samak's brother – M.P. for Bangkok, the Thai Citizen Party, Leader of the Thai Citizen Party (2001–2019), Member of the Democrat Party

== T ==
=== Thaiseth family ===
- Chada Thaiseth – Deputy Minister of Interior (2023–2024)
  - Mananya Thaiseth, sister of Chada, Deputy Minister of Agriculture and Cooperatives (2019–2023)
  - Sabida Thaiseth, daughter of Chada – Minister of Culture (2025–present), Deputy Minister of Interior (2024–2025)
  - Weerachart Rasamee, son-in-law of Chada – Mayor of Talukdoo municipality, Uthai Thani Province (?–2023)

=== Thienthong family ===
- Sanoh Thienthong – Minister of Interior (1996–1997), Minister of Public Health (1995–1996)
  - Surachart Thienthong, son of Sanoh – Candidate for Member of the House of Representatives (2023)
  - Sorawong Thienthong, son of Sanoh – Minister of Tourism and Sports (2024–present), Member of the House of Representatives (2023–present)
  - Surakiat Thienthong, son of Sanoh – Member of the House of Representatives (2023–present)
  - Kwanruen Thienthong, sister of Sanoh – Member of the House of Representatives (2023–present), Member of the Senate (2006)
    - Trinuch Thienthong, daughter of Kwanruen – Minister of Labor (2025–present), Minister of Education (2021–2023)

=== Thaugsuban family ===
- Suthep Thaugsuban – Deputy Prime Minister of Thailand (2008–2011), Minister of Transport (1997–2000)
  - Akanat Promphan, son-in-law of Suthep – Minister of Industry (1997–present), Secretary-general of United Thai Nation Party (2022–present), Member of the House of Representatives (2023–present)
  - Chane Thausuban, brother of Suthep – M.P. for Surat Thani Province, the Democrat Party, the Action Coalition for Thailand Party candidate for Surat Thani M.P.
  - Thani Thaugsuban, brother of Suthep and Chane – M.P. for Surat Thani Province, the Democrat Party, the Action Coalition for Thailand Party candidate for Surat Thani M.P., and President of the Surat Thani Provincial Administration Organization (PAO)

== V ==
=== Vejjajiva family ===
- **Abhisit Vejjajiva** – 27th Prime Minister of Thailand (2008–2011), Leader of the Democrat Party (2005–2019)
  - Athasit Vejjajiva, Abhisit's father – Deputy Minister of Public Health (1991–1992)
  - Suranand Vejjajiva, Abhisit's cousin and Athasit's nephew – Minister attached to the Prime Minister's Office (2005–2006), Secretary-General of the Prime Minister's Office (2012–2014), the Thai Rak Thai Party M.P. party-list, the Palang Dharma Party candidate for Bangkok M.P.
  - Pongvej Vejjajiva, cousin of Abhisit and Suranand and nephew of Athasit – M.P. for Chanthaburi Province with the Thai Rak Thai Party and the Democrat Party.
  - Parit Wacharasindhu, nephew of Abhisit, Suranand, and Pongvej, and grandson of Athasit. – the Democrat Party candidate for Bangkok M.P., and the People's Party party-list M.P.

== W ==
=== Wangsuphakijkosol family ===
- Weerasak Wangsuphakijkosol – Deputy Transport Minister (2021–2023), Deputy Transport Minister (2019–2021)
  - Sudawan Wangsuphakijkosol, daughter of Weerasak – Minister of Culture (2024–2025), Minister of Tourism and Sports (2023–2024)

== X ==
=== Xanthavanij family ===
- Somkiat Xanthavanij – M.P. for Bangkok, the Democrat Party
  - Apimuk Xanthavanij, Somkiat's son – the Democrat MPDC, Bang Kho Laem District, the Democrat Party candidate for Bangkok M.P.

== Y ==
=== Yubamrung family ===
- Chalerm Yubamrung – M.P. for Bangkok, the Democrat Party, Leader of the Mass Party (1986–1993, 1995–1998, 2004), Deputy Prime Minister (2011–2013), Minister of Labour (2013–2014), Minister of Public Health (2008), Minister of Interior (2008), Minister of Justice (1995–1996), Minister to the Office of the Prime Minister (1988–1990)
  - Nawarat Yubamrung, brother of Chalerm – BMA Council Member for Nong Khaem District
  - Wan Yubamrung, son of Chalerm and nephew of Nawarat – M.P. for Bangkok, the Pheu Thai Party, Member of the Palang Pracharath Party
  - Duang Yubamrung, son of Chalerm, and nephew of Nawarat, and brother of Wan – the New Aspiration Party candidate for Bangkok M.P.
