= Somsak Prissanananthakul =

Thai politician (born 1951)

Somsak Prissanananthakul สมศักดิ์ ปริศนานันทกุล

Minister of Agriculture and Cooperatives
- In office 24 September 2008 – 2 December 2008
- Prime Minister: Somchai Wongsawat
- Preceded by: Theera Sutabut
- In office 6 February 2008 – 9 September 2008
- Prime Minister: Samak Sundaravej
- Succeeded by: Theera Wongsamut

Minister of Education
- In office 9 July 1999 – 9 November 2000
- Prime Minister: Chuan Leekpai
- Preceded by: Panja Kesornthong
- Succeeded by: Kasem Wattanachai

Personal details
- Born: 24 April 1951 (age 75) Ang Thong, Thailand
- Party: Bhumjaithai Party; Chartthaipattana Party (until 2018)
- Spouse: Raveewan Prissanananthakul
- Children: Paradorn Prissananantakul
- Education: Ramkhamhaeng University
- Profession: Politician

Somsak Prissanananthakul (Thai: สมศักดิ์ ปริศนานันทกุล, RTGS: Somsak Pritsanananthakun; born April 27, 1951) is a Thai politician. He served as Minister of Education, Minister of Agriculture and Cooperatives, and chief advisor of Chartthaipattana Party. In 2007 he criticized NRC members for focusing their campaign on removing Thaksin Shinawatra members. In 2008 he said he would fight gaming addiction and reduce it by 70% within 90 days by using more than 1000 Royal Thai Police officials to police gaming shops in Bangkok. In 2010 he was defeated by Thaksin Shinawatra in Thai General Elections. On October 14, 2013 as a Deputy House Speaker he said Samak Sundaravej should reconsider his ban on freedom of speech. On March 26, 2014, he said that Thailand would be ready to join Association of Southeast Asian Nations in 100 days.
