= Suphan Buri =

Suphan Buri สุพรรณบุรี
- Town
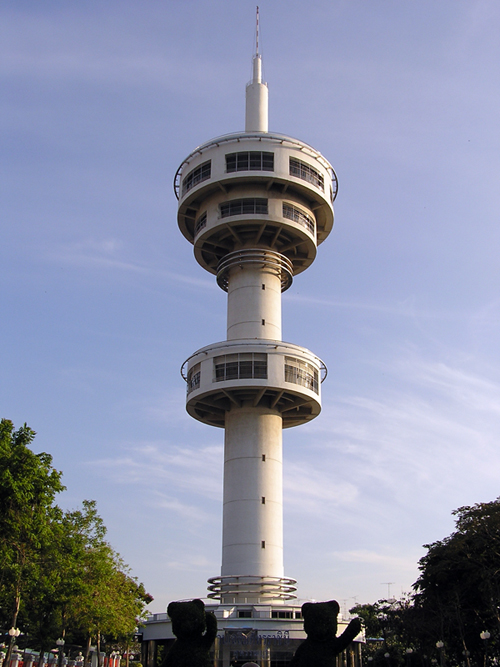
- Banharn-Jamsai Tower

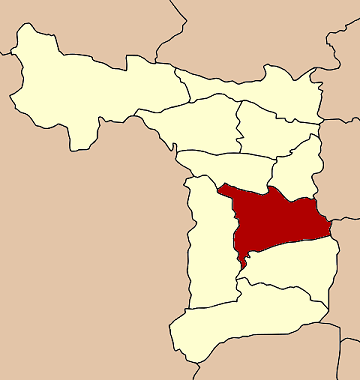
- Location in Suphan Buri Province
- Coordinates: 14°28′3″N 100°07′01″E
- Country: Thailand
- Province: Suphan Buri
- District: Mueang Suphan Buri

Population (2006)
  - Total: 26,656
- Time zone: UTC+7 (ICT)

Suphan Buri (Thai pronunciation: [sù.pʰān būrīː]) is a town (thesaban mueang) in central Thailand. It covers tambon Tha Philiang and parts of tambons Rua Yai and Tha Rahat, all within the Mueang Suphan Buri District. As of 2006 it had a population of 26,656. The town is 101 km north-northwest of Bangkok.

== Geography ==
Suphan Buri lies on the Tha Chin River (known locally as the Suphan River), at an elevation of 11 metres (36 ft). The surrounding area is low-lying and flat, with rice farms covering much of the land.

== Climate ==
Suphan Buri has a tropical wet and dry climate (Köppen climate classification Aw). Winters are quite dry and very warm. Temperatures rise until April, which is very hot with the average daily maximum at 36.9 °C (98.4 °F). The monsoon season runs from May through October, with heavy rain and somewhat cooler temperatures during the day, although nights remain warm.

Climate data for Suphan Buri (1991–2020, extremes 1952-present)
Month	Jan	Feb	Mar	Apr	May	Jun	Jul	Aug	Sep	Oct	Nov	Dec	Year
Record high °C (°F)	36.2 (97.2)	39.8 (103.6)	41.0 (105.8)	42.5 (108.5)	42.6 (108.7)	39.3 (102.7)	38.8 (101.8)	38.6 (101.5)	37.5 (99.5)	36.9 (98.4)	36.7 (98.1)	35.5 (95.9)	42.6 (108.7)
Mean daily maximum °C (°F)	32.1 (89.8)	34.1 (93.4)	35.9 (96.6)	37.3 (99.1)	36.3 (97.3)	35.1 (95.2)	34.3 (93.7)	34.2 (93.6)	33.8 (92.8)	32.8 (91.0)	32.2 (90.0)	31.3 (88.3)	34.1 (93.4)
Daily mean °C (°F)	26.1 (79.0)	27.7 (81.9)	29.3 (84.7)	30.7 (87.3)	30.3 (86.5)	29.5 (85.1)	29.0 (84.2)	28.7 (83.7)	28.6 (83.5)	28.3 (82.9)	27.3 (81.1)	25.7 (78.3)	28.4 (83.2)
Mean daily minimum °C (°F)	21.1 (70.0)	22.7 (72.9)	24.5 (76.1)	25.8 (78.4)	26.0 (78.8)	25.8 (78.4)	25.3 (77.5)	25.1 (77.2)	24.9 (76.8)	24.6 (76.3)	23.0 (73.4)	20.8 (69.4)	24.1 (75.4)
Record low °C (°F)	9.2 (48.6)	12.0 (53.6)	14.9 (58.8)	20.0 (68.0)	20.9 (69.6)	22.0 (71.6)	22.0 (71.6)	22.0 (71.6)	21.7 (71.1)	18.0 (64.4)	14.5 (58.1)	10.0 (50.0)	9.2 (48.6)
Average precipitation mm (inches)	4.9 (0.19)	5.6 (0.22)	28.2 (1.11)	54.3 (2.14)	119.8 (4.72)	92.5 (3.64)	99.3 (3.91)	117.8 (4.64)	218.8 (8.61)	187.0 (7.36)	43.2 (1.70)	7.0 (0.28)	978.4 (38.52)
Average precipitation days (≥ 1.0 mm)	0.5	0.6	2.0	3.5	8.7	8.8	9.7	10.6	13.8	11.3	2.8	0.7	73
Average relative humidity (%)	71.3	71.9	72.3	70.8	73.9	75.2	75.9	76.7	79.7	79.8	74.0	69.4	74.2
Mean monthly sunshine hours	226.3	211.9	238.7	204.0	155.0	114.0	117.8	58.9	108.0	145.7	186.0	226.3	1,992.6
Mean daily sunshine hours	7.3	7.5	7.7	6.8	5.0	3.8	3.8	1.9	3.6	4.7	6.2	7.3	5.5
Source 1: World Meteorological Organization
Source 2: Office of Water Management and Hydrology, Royal Irrigation Department (sun 1981–2010)(extremes)

== History ==
The moated settlement that Karen Mudar records as Suphanburi encloses 366 ha, which makes it one of the three largest on the central plain, after Nakhon Pathom and beside Phraek Si Racha, and one of the seven regional centres in her four-level administrative hierarchy; the region assigned to it holds nine moated settlements, and its moat, unlike several others on the plain, shows no sign of enlargement within the first-millennium period she covers. Her sample consists of moated settlements carrying Dvaravati material culture, which she dates as a group from the beginning of the 6th century, some five centuries before the traditional foundation of the town; she dates no individual site, and the Suphanburi moat has not been dated on its own.

Baker and Pasuk connect the town's beginnings to the decline of U Thong. On their account the people of U Thong may have moved some 30 kilometres north-east, and the plan of the town they reached is a hybrid. It stands in a bend of the river, closed by a moat measuring 1.9 by 0.7 kilometres, with a major forest temple outside the walls in the Dvaravati manner, but the moat is a strict rectangle rather than the usual conch shape and a relic stupa in Angkorian style stands at the centre. They hold that both the walls and the stupa may date to the 12th century.

Kilns at Ban Bang Pun, on the Suphan river north of the town, were making large stoneware jars in the Southern Song period of the 12th and 13th centuries, on a technology brought from southern China. Sherds from them have been found as far away as the Phetchaburi city wall and the mouth of the Khaem Nu in Chanthaburi.

19th-century Siamese historian and statesman Damrong Rajanubhab speculated that the city was founded under the name Suvarnapurī around 1350, around the time when nearby U Thong was plagued by an epidemic. U Thong was the capital of the Kingdom of Suphannaphum, one of the mueang of the Dvaravati period, in which Ramathibodi I had reigned before founding Ayutthaya, the capital of the homonymous kingdom in the same period. U Thong's ancient name was Suphannaphum or Suvarnabhumi (literally: the origin or birthplace of gold), which was probably abandoned when the water shortage epidemic raged and Suvarnapurī was founded along the Tha Chin River. Ramathibodi appointed his brother-in-law Khunluang Pha Ngua as governor of Suvarnapurī, who gave the city its present name Suphanburi and who would become king of Ayutthaya in 1370 with the name Borommarachathirat I.

Later, Suphanburi remained a frontier town between Siam and the kingdoms that alternated in modern day Burma. Several battles were fought in its surroundings between the Siamese and Burmese armies until the first half of the 19th century. The most important was the one that took place on January 18, 1593 in Nong Sarai, a few kilometers northwest of the city. The battle was in progress, when the Siamese king Naresuan challenged the heir to the throne of the Toungoo dynasty to a duel on the back of elephants to decide the fate of the clash. Within minutes Naresuan killed his rival, the Burmese troops withdrew and Ayutthaya thus gained independence after 29 years of vassalage at Pegu's court. The provincial coat of arms still remembers this duel.

The municipality took on its present form during the reign of Mongkut (1851-1868), when the central nucleus was unified with the neighboring settlements. Suphanburi underwent major changes in the years between the 20th and 21st centuries at the behest of Banharn Silpa-Archa, a wealthy entrepreneur native of the city who was prime minister of Thailand between 1995 and 1996. Banharn was accused of spending the 90% of the national budget for the Suphanburi Province. Among the various infrastructures he had built, many of which took the name Baharn-Jaemsai (Jaemsai is the name of his wife), there are seven schools, a 123-meter high tower in the city center, another tower where a clock and a series of pedestrian bridges that cross wide, almost deserted streets.

== Culture ==
Suphan Buri is the place where Luk thung Superstar Pumpuang Duangjan was buried and is sometimes called the Thai Nashville, as it is an important center of the music industry.

== Transportation ==
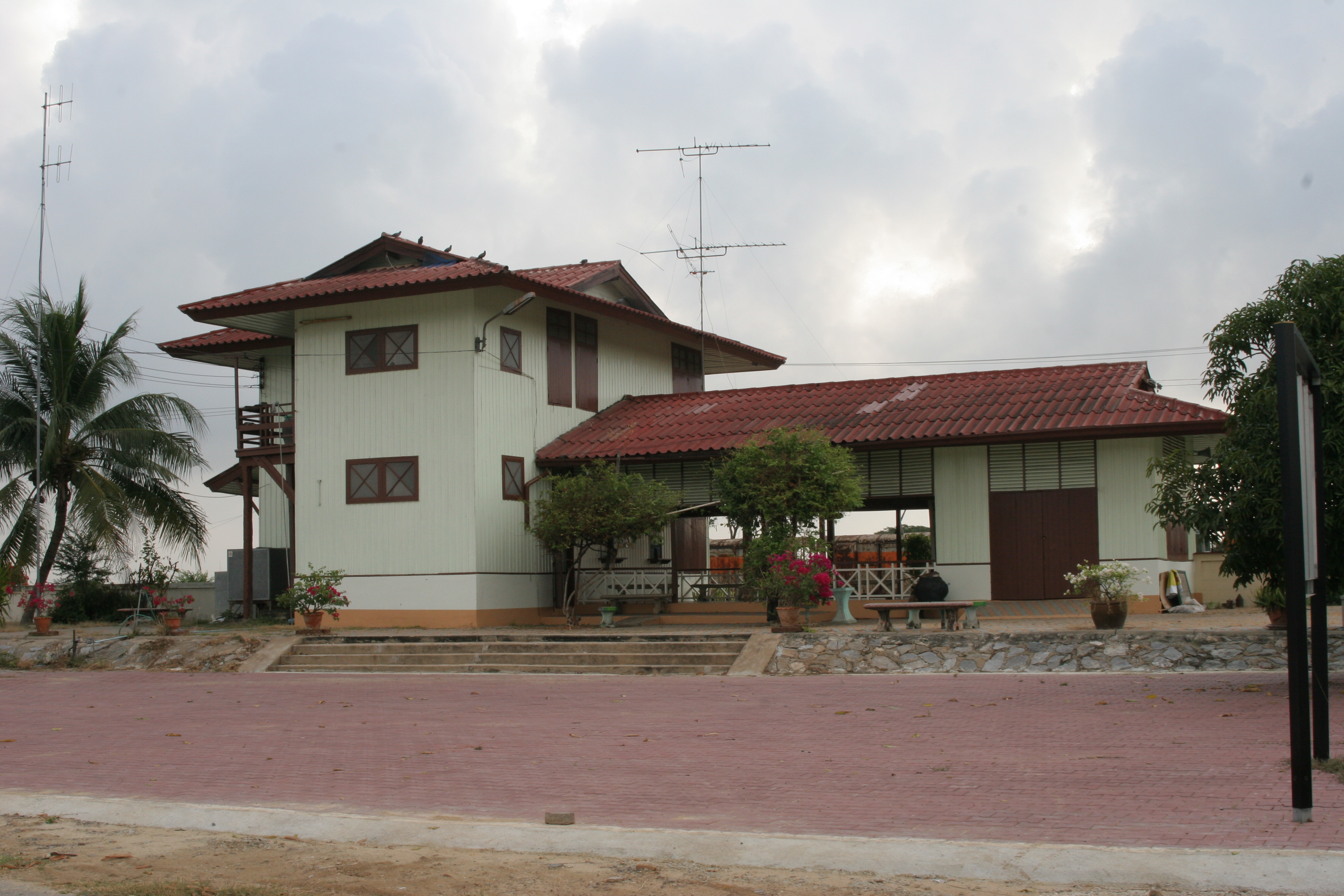
Suphan Buri Railway Station

Suphan Buri is at the end of a 157-kilometre (98 mi) branch line of the State Railway of Thailand's southern line. The branch meets the main line at Nong Pla Duk Junction near Ban Pong.

Route 340 passes through Suphan Buri, leading north to Chai Nat and south to Bang Bua Phong. Route 321 leads west and then south to Nakhon Pathom. Route 329 leads east to Bang Pahan. Route 3195 leads northeast to Ang Thong.

== Gallery ==
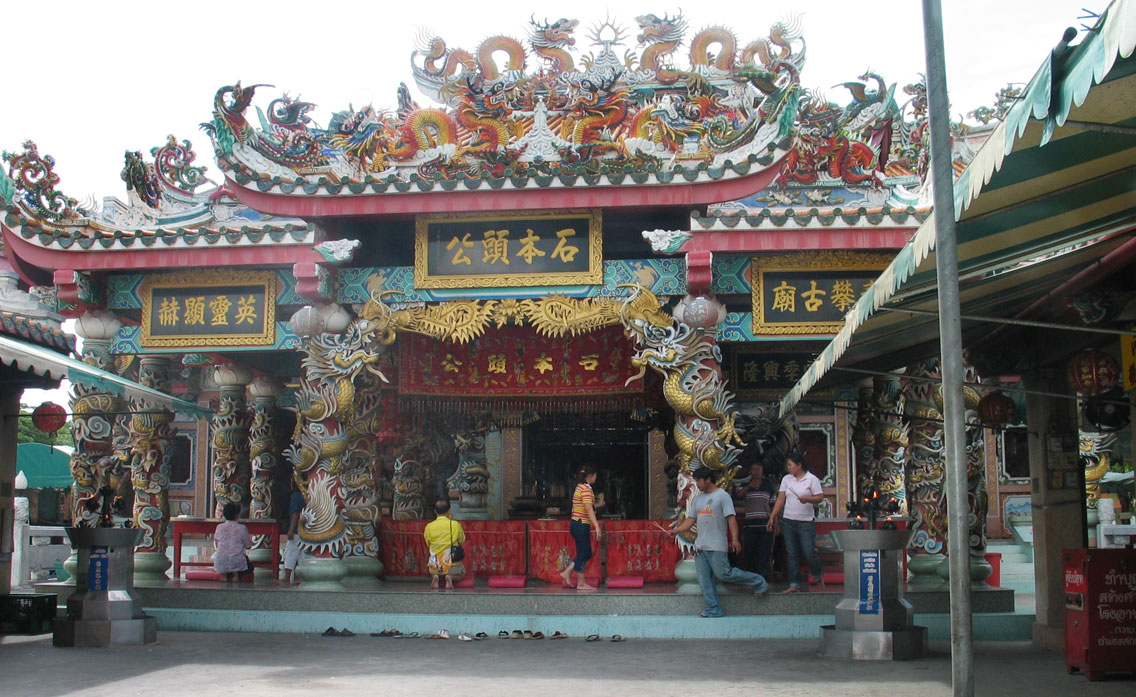
The City Pillar is housed in a Chinese temple

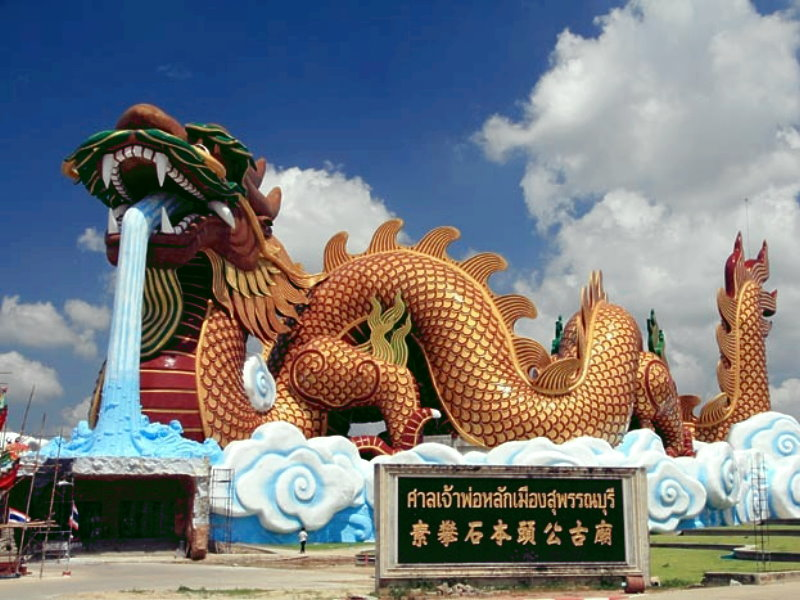
Gate City Pillar Shrine, Suphan Buri

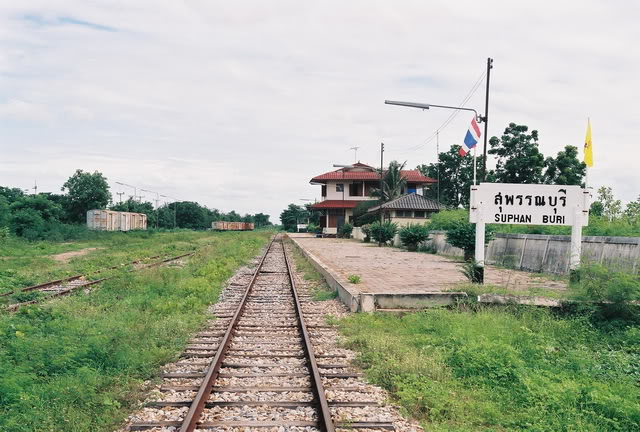
Suphan Buri Railway Station

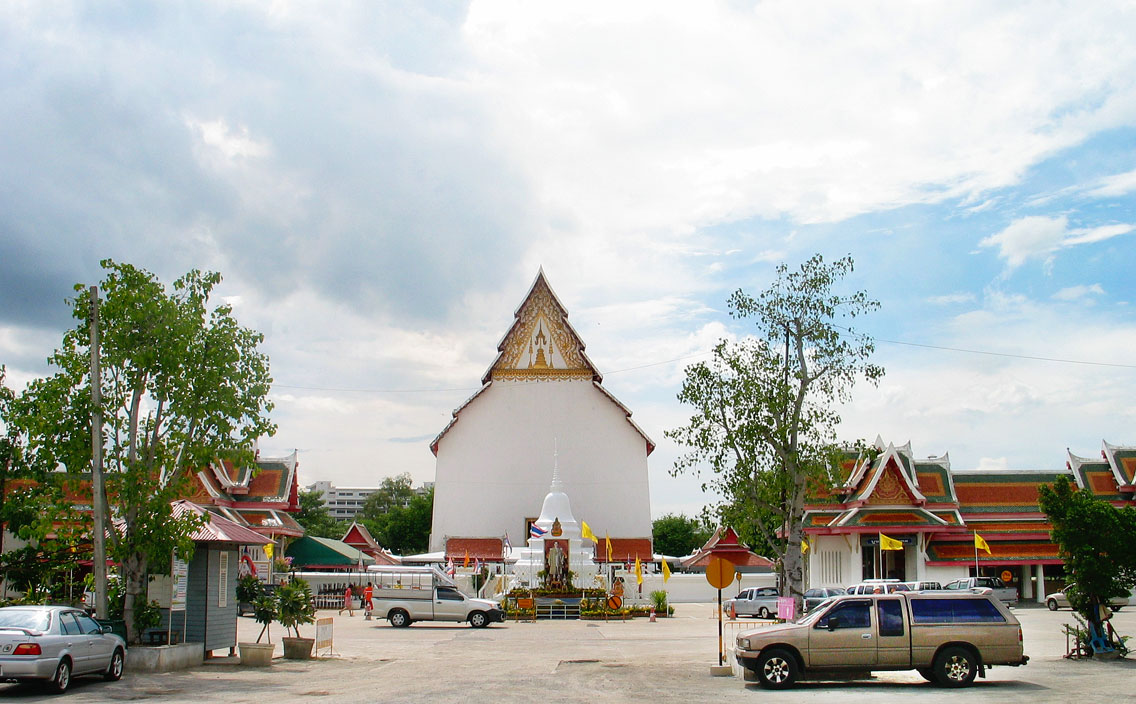
Wat Pa Le Lai
