= Phibunsongkhram (disambiguation) =

Plaek Phibunsongkhram (1897–1964) was a prime minister of Thailand.

Phibunsongkhram may also refer to:

- Phibunsongkhram province, former province of Thailand corresponding to Cambodian Siem Reap Province

== Surname ==
People with the surname Phibunsongkhram, also spelled Pibulsonggram—members of the Pibulsonggram family—include:

- Plaek Phibunsongkhram, anti-communist ruler of Thailand (1897–1964)
- Nitya Pibulsonggram, Thai career diplomat and politician (1941–2014)
- Krissanapoom Pibulsonggram, Thai singer and actor (b. 1996)
