= Choonhavan =

Choonhavan is a surname, used by members of the Choonhavan family.

Notable people with the surname include:

- Boonruen Choonhavan (1920–2021), Thai socialite and wife of Chatichai
- Chatichai Choonhavan (1920–1998), Thai army officer, diplomat, and politician, son of Phin
- Kraisak Choonhavan (1947–2020), Thai politician, son of Boonruen and Chatchai
- Phin Choonhavan (1891–1973), Thai military leader and politician
