= Banharn-Jamsai Tower =

Coordinates: 14.4719°N 100.1184°E

- หอคอยบรรหาร-แจ่มใส
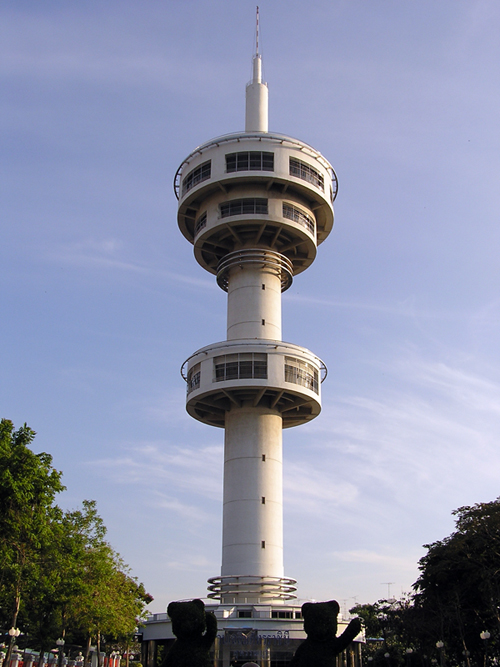
- Banharn-Jamsai Tower
- Interactive map of the Banharn-Jamsai Tower area

General information
- Status: Completed
- Type: Tower
- Location: Suphan Buri, Thailand
- Owner: Town of Suphan Buri

Height
- Height: 123.25 m (404.4 ft)

Other information
- Parking: Yes

Banharn-Jamsai Tower (Thai: หอคอยบรรหาร-แจ่มใส; RTGS: ho khoi Banhan Chaemsai ) is the tallest tower in Thailand, and a main attraction of Suphan Buri Province. It in Chaloem Phatthara Rachinee Park, Tambon Tha Pee Leang, Mueang Suphan Buri District. It is named after former prime minister Banharn Silpa-archa and his wife Jamsai Silpa-archa.

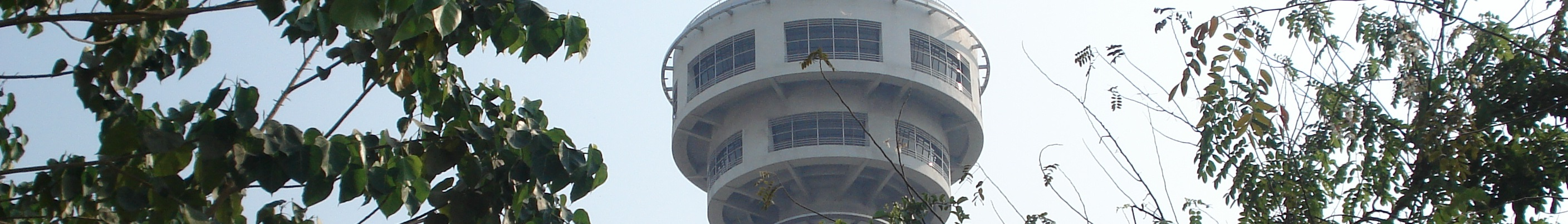
Barnharn-Jamsai Tower pod

== Detail ==
- Floor 1: entrance and souvenir shop
- Floor 2: food center and view point
- Floor 3: view point and souvenir shop
- Floor 4: view point (with telescopes) and historical exhibition
