= Theera Wongsamut =

Thai politician

- ธีระ วงศ์สมุทร

Minister of Agriculture and Cooperatives
- In office 20 December 2008 – 2 December 2012
- Prime Minister: Abhisit Vejjajiva; Yingluck Shinawatra
- Preceded by: Somsak Prissanananthakul
- Succeeded by: Yukol Limlamthong

Leader of the Chartthaipattana Party
- In office 19 March 2013 – 26 October 2018
- Preceded by: Chumpol Silpa-archa
- Succeeded by: Kanchana Silpa-archa

Personal details
- Born: 15 December 1948 (age 77) Nakhon Si Thammarat, Thailand
- Party: Chartthaipattana Party
- Spouse: Warunyu Wongsamut
- Education: Kasetsart University
- Profession: Politician

Theera Wongsamut (Thai: ธีระ วงศ์สมุทร, RTGS: Thira Wongsamut; born 15 December 1948) is former minister of Agriculture and Cooperatives of Thailand. He is also leader of the Chartthaipattana Party until 2018.

== Early life and education ==
Theera graduated high school from Pak Phanang School in Nakhon Si Thammarat and Triam Udom Suksa School in Bangkok. After finishing high school he Studied a bachelor's degree in the engineering irrigation field from Kasetsart University in 1970 and a master's degree in business administration from Kasetsart University.

== Party activity ==
He was elected leader of the Chartthaipattana Party on 19 March 2013. He replaced Chumpol Silpa-archa, who died on 21 January 2013.

== Experiences ==
Theera Wongsamut had much experience before becoming Minister of Agriculture and Cooperatives. He starts his career as Engineer in Construction Division, Royal Irrigation Department in 1971. Then he was appointed as Deputy Director-General of Irrigation Department, Ministry of Agriculture and Cooperatives in 1998. Until 2006 he was appointed as Deputy Permanent Secretary of Ministry of Agriculture and Cooperatives. Finally, he was Director-General of Royal Irrigation Department, Ministry of Agriculture and Cooperatives. In the 2008 Abhisit Vejjajiva and Yingluck Shinawatra government, he was appointed as Minister of the Ministry of Agriculture and Cooperatives.
