= Kanchana Silpa-archa =

Thai politician (born 1960)

- กัญจนา ศิลปอาชา
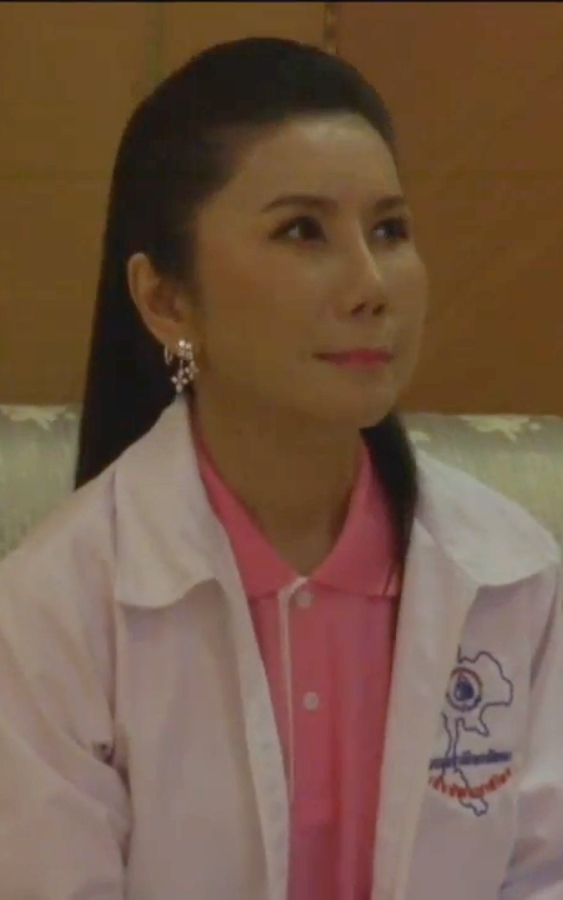
- Kanchana Silpa-archa in 2018

Leader of the Chartthaipattana Party
- Incumbent
- Assumed office 12 December 2025
- Preceded by: Varawut Silpa-archa
- In office 26 October 2018 – 10 October 2022
- Preceded by: Theera Wongsamut
- Succeeded by: Varawut Silpa-archa

Deputy Minister of Education
- In office 9 July 1999 – 6 January 2001
- Prime Minister: Chuan Leekpai
- Preceded by: Phairot Losunthorn
- Succeeded by: Wichai Tansiri

Personal details
- Born: 15 February 1960 (age 66) Suphan Buri, Thailand
- Party: Chartthaipattana Party (2014–present)
- Other political affiliations: Thai Nation Party (1995–2008)
- Parents: Banharn Silpa-archa (father); Jamsai Silpa-archa (mother)
- Relatives: Chumpol Silpa-archa (uncle); Varawut Silpa-archa (brother)
- Education: B.S. in Statistics Chulalongkorn University; M.B.A. University of Wisconsin

Kanchana Silpa-archa (Thai: กัญจนา ศิลปอาชา, RTGS: Kanchana Sinlapa-a-cha; born 15 February 1960) is a Thai politician who has served as the leader of the Chartthaipattana Party. She previously served as Deputy Minister of the Ministry of Education from 1999 to 2001.

== Early life ==
Kanchana was born on 15 February 1960 at Chao Phraya Yommarat Hospital in Suphan Buri, Thailand. She is one of the three children of former Prime Minister Banharn Silpa-archa and Jamsai Silpa-archa. She is the niece of former Deputy Prime Minister Chumpol Silpa-archa.

In 1996, she was dragged by her father, who was facing allegations of corruption and incompetence, while being interviewed by the media after she called for his resignation.

== Education ==
Kanchana completed her lower secondary education at Rajini School and at Triam Udom Suksa School for her higher secondary education. She graduated in 1981 with a first-class honor in a bachelor's degree in statistics from the Faculty of Commerce and Accountancy from Chulalongkorn University and went on to graduate in 1983 with a master's degree in business administration from the University of Wisconsin–Madison.

== Political career ==
From 1995 to 2008, Kanchana was a member of the Thai House of Representatives representing Suphan Buri Province. During Prime Minister Chuan Leekpai's second administration, she was appointed as Deputy Minister of the Ministry of Education.

She also became a member of the National Legislative Assembly in 2006 after the coup d'etat.

Upon the dissolution of the Thai Nation Party on 2 December 2008 by the Constitutional Court of Thailand due to electoral fraud charges, she was one of the party executives who were banned from participating from Thai politics for five years. After the ban lapsed, she rejoined politics by filing her candidacy as the second party-list representative under the Chartthaipattana Party.

On 26 October 2018, the Chartthaipattana Party convened to elect its new leader. Kanchana was nominated for the position alongside fellow party member Theera Wongsamut. However, Theera declined the nomination which paved the way for Kanchana to become the party's new leader. Prior to the convention, her brother Varawut Silpa-archa was speculated to lead the party.
