= Chumpol Silpa-archa =

Thai politician (1940–2013)

Chumpol Silpa-archa MPCh MWM
- ชุมพล ศิลปอาชา
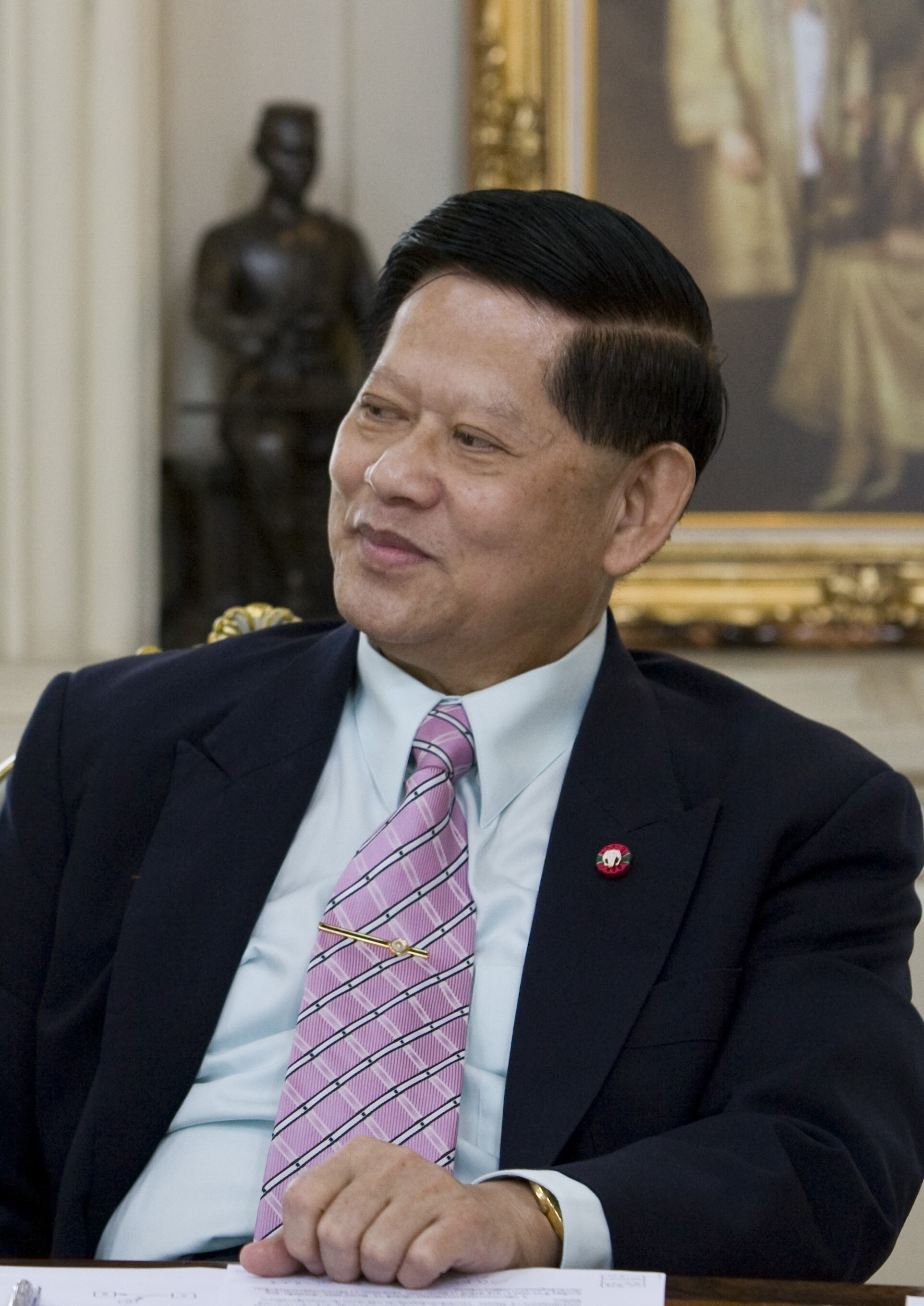
- Chumpol Silpa-archa in 2009

Deputy Prime Minister of Thailand
- In office 9 August 2011 – 21 January 2013
- Prime Minister: Yingluck Shinawatra

Minister of Tourism and Sports
- In office 20 December 2008 – 21 January 2013
- Prime Minister: Abhisit Vejjajiva (until 2011); Yingluck Shinawatra
- Preceded by: Weerasak Kowsurat
- Succeeded by: Somsak Phusrisak

Minister of Education
- In office 14 November 1997 – 1 October 1998
- Prime Minister: Chuan Leekpai
- Preceded by: Chingchai Mongkoltham
- Succeeded by: Panja Kesornthong

Leader of the Chartthaipattana Party
- In office 24 January 2009 – 21 January 2013
- Preceded by: Krit Rattanakaminee
- Succeeded by: Theera Wongsamut

Personal details
- Born: 6 June 1940 Suphan Buri, Thailand
- Died: 21 January 2013 (aged 72) Bangkok, Thailand
- Party: Chartthaipattana Party
- Other political affiliations: Thai Nation Party (until 2008)
- Spouse: Duangmarn Silpa-archa
- Relatives: Banharn Silpa-archa (brother); Kanchana Silpa-archa (niece)
- Education: Thammasat University; Syracuse University
- Profession: Politician
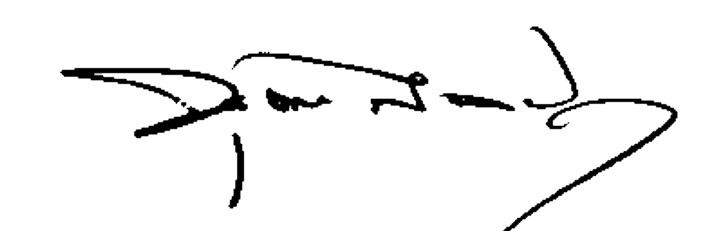
- Signature

Chumpol Silpa-archa (Thai: ชุมพล ศิลปอาชา, RTGS: Chumphon Sinlapa-a-cha, IPA: [t͡ɕʰum.pʰon sǐn.lá.pà.ʔaː.t͡ɕʰaː]; 6 June 1940 – 21 January 2013) was a Thai politician who served in the government of Thailand as Minister of Tourism and Sports from 2008 to 2013; he was also Deputy Prime Minister from 2011 to 2013. Beginning in January 2009, he was the president of the Chartthaipattana Party. He was the younger brother of Prime Minister Banharn Silpa-archa.

== Early life ==
Born at Suphanburi, Chumpol held a Bachelor of Laws from the Thammasat University and an MPA from the Syracuse University.

== Political career ==
He worked as a civil servant and political science lecturer at the Thammasat University, before he entered politics in 1979. A member of the conservative-populist Thai Nation Party, he represented Suphan Buri Province in parliament. In the following years he held different high-rank government positions. In 1986 and 1992, he was Vice President of the House of Representatives. From 1997 to 1998 he was Minister of Education in Chuan Leekpai's cabinet. As he was no member of the Thai Nation Party's executive board, he was, unlike his brother, not banned from political activity by the Constitutional Court's ruling of 2 December 2008. So he could, as his brother's proxy, become leader of the Chartthaipattana Party, which is the de facto successor of the dissolved Thai Nation Party. After his grouping broke the coalition with the People's Power Party and joined the Democrat-led government, Chumpol became Minister of Tourism and Sports under Prime Minister Abhisit Vejjajiva.

When the Pheu Thai Party led by Yingluck Shinawatra won the 2011 elections, Chumpol changed sides again, and directed his Chartthaipattana Party into the coalition with Pheu Thai. He kept the Tourism and Sports portfolio and was additionally appointed Deputy Prime Minister, on 9 August 2011.

== Death ==
Chumpol died of heart failure on 21 January 2013, around 09:30 hours, at Ramathibodi Hospital, while holding the offices of Deputy Prime Minister and Minister of Tourism and Sports.

== Royal Decorations ==
Chumpol Silpa-archa has been decorated with the Special Class of both the Order of the White Elephant and the Order of the Crown of Thailand.
