= Varawut Silpa-archa =

Thai Minister of Social Development and Human Security since 2023 (born 1973)

- วราวุธ ศิลปอาชา
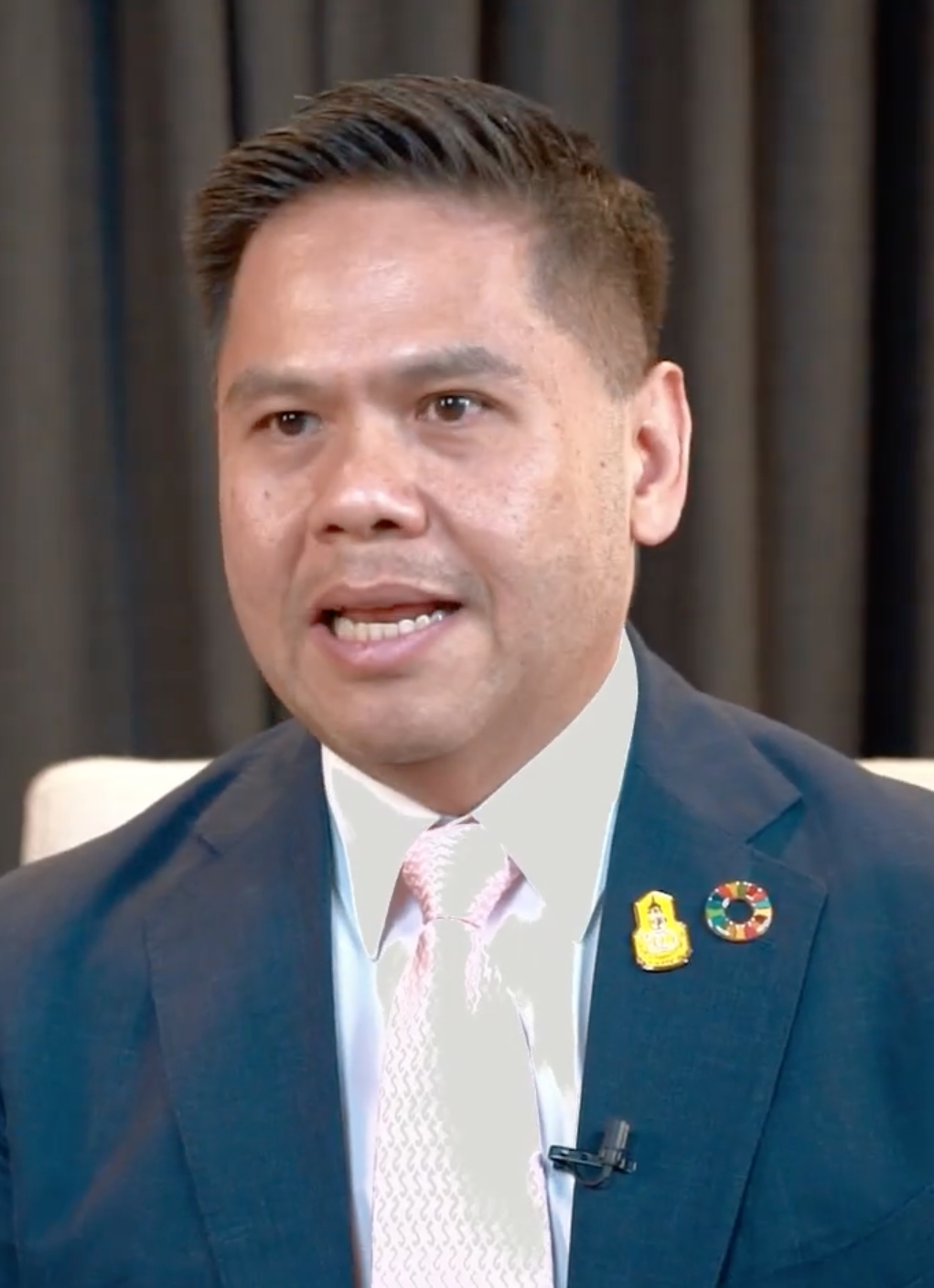
- Varawut in 2023

Minister of Industry
- Incumbent
- Assumed office 30 March 2026
- Prime Minister: Anutin Charnvirakul
- Preceded by: Thanakorn Wangboonkongchana

Minister of Social Development and Human Security
- In office 1 September 2023 – 19 September 2025
- Prime Minister: Srettha Thavisin; Paetongtarn Shinawatra
- Preceded by: Juti Krairiksh
- Succeeded by: Akara Prompao

Leader of the Chartthaipattana Party
- In office 3 October 2022 – 12 December 2025
- Preceded by: Kanchana Silpa-archa
- Succeeded by: Kanchana Silpa-archa

Minister of Natural Resources and Environment
- In office 10 July 2019 – 1 September 2023
- Prime Minister: Prayut Chan-o-cha
- Preceded by: Surasak Karnjanarat
- Succeeded by: Patcharawat Wongsuwan

Member of the House of Representatives
- In office 24 March 2019 – 16 April 2026

Personal details
- Born: 11 July 1973 (age 53) Bangkok, Thailand
- Party: Bhumjaithai
- Other political affiliations: Thai Nation (1995–2008); Chartthaipattana (2013–2025)
- Spouse: Suwanna Silpa-archa
- Relations: Chumpol Silpa-archa (uncle); Kanchana Silpa-archa (sister); Teekhree Sila-archa (daughter); Rittana Silpa-archa (son); Palomporn Sila-Archa (son)
- Parents: Banharn Silpa-archa (father); Jamsai Silpa-archa (mother)
- Education: University College London; University of Wisconsin–Madison

Varawut Silpa-archa (Thai: วราวุธ ศิลปอาชา, RTGS: Warawut Sinlapa-acha; born 11 July 1973) is a Thai politician who has served as Minister of Industry under the second cabinet of Anutin Charnvirakul, Also former Minister of Social Development and Human Security from 2023 to 2025 under the coalition government of Prime Minister Srettha Thavisin and Paetongtarn Shinawatra cabinet until 2025. Previously, he served as Minister of Natural Resources and Environment in the second cabinet of Prime Minister Prayut Chan-o-cha.

== Early life and education ==
Varawut Silpa-archa was born on 11 July 1973 at Bang Khun Phrom Subdistrict, Phra Nakhon District, Bangkok. His nickname is "Top". He is the youngest son of Banharn Silpa-archa, a former leader of the Chart Thai Party, and former Prime Minister of Thailand with Khunying Jamsai Silpa-archa. Within his family life, he is married to Suwanna Silpa-archa and has three children.

Varawut graduated from primary and secondary grades 1-2 from Saint Gabriel's College and attended high school in England. He holds a bachelor's degree in B.Eng. (Mechanical Engineering), University College London, United Kingdom, and a master's degree MBA in Finance and Banking, University of Wisconsin–Madison in the United States.

== Political careers ==
Varawut entered the political path following his father by being a member of the House of Representatives Suphan Buri Province in 2001, 2005 and 2007 under the Thai Nation Party and received the position of Deputy Minister of Transport in the government of Prime Minister Somchai Wongsawat. In 2008, he was disqualified from politics for five years because he was an executive director of the Chart Thai Party, which the Constitutional Court judges had decided to dissolve.

Later, in the 2019 Thai general election, he was elected on the party-list system and was appointed Minister of Natural Resources and Environment in the government of Prime Minister Prayut Chan-o-cha.

== Personal life ==
He is married to Suwanna Silpa-archa (née Raiwin), President of the Figure and Speed Skating Association of Thailand/Vice President of the Olympic Committee of Thailand, who is the younger sister of Kung- Ravich Raiwin, a famous actor, and the older sister of Ying- Kanya Raiwin, a famous presenter and actress. They have 3 children together: Teekhree Silpa-Archa (Thames), a member of the Thai national figure skating team, Rittana Silpa-archa (Big Ben) and Palomporn Silpa-archa (Austin).

== Royal decorations ==
Varawut has received the following royal decorations in the Honours System of Thailand:

- 2020 - Knight Grand Cordon of the Most Exalted Order of the White Elephant
- 2008 - Knight Grand Cordon of The Most Noble Order of the Crown of Thailand

Political offices
Preceded by Juti Krairiksh	Minister of Social Development and Human Security; 2023–present	Incumbent
