= Samak Sundaravej =

Prime Minister of Thailand in 2008

Samak Sundaravej MPCh MWM PPh TCW
- สมัคร สุนทรเวช
- Samak in 2008

25th Prime Minister of Thailand
- In office 29 January 2008 – 9 September 2008
- Monarch: Bhumibol Adulyadej
- Deputy: See list: Somchai Wongsawat; Mingkwan Saengsuwan; Sooraphong Suebwonglee; Sahas Banditkul; Sanan Kachornprasart; Suwit Khunkitti; Kowit Wattana; Man Phatnothai
- Preceded by: Surayud Chulanont
- Succeeded by: Somchai Wongsawat
Ministerial offices
Minister of Defence
In office 6 February 2008 – 9 September 2008
Prime Minister	Himself
Preceded by	Boonrod Somthat
Succeeded by	Somchai Wongsawat
Minister of Interior
In office 8 October 1976 – 19 October 1977
Prime Minister	Thanin Kraivichien
Preceded by	Seni Pramoj
Succeeded by	Kriangsak Chamanan

13th Governor of Bangkok
- In office 23 July 2000 – 28 August 2004
- Preceded by: Bhichit Rattakul
- Succeeded by: Apirak Kosayodhin

Member of the House of Representatives
- In office 23 December 2007 – 30 November 2008
- Constituency: Party-list Area 6
- In office 26 January 1975 – 1 June 2000
- Constituency: Bangkok 6th District (1975–1976); Bangkok 1st District (1976–2000)

Leader of the People's Power Party
- In office 24 August 2007 – 30 September 2008
- Preceded by: Supaporn Tienkaew (de jure); Chaturon Chaisang (as Acting Leader of the Thai Rak Thai Party; de facto)
- Succeeded by: Somchai Wongsawat (acting)

Personal details
- Born: 13 June 1935 Bangkok, Siam (now Bangkok, Thailand)
- Died: 24 November 2009 (aged 74) Bumrungrad International Hospital, Watthana, Bangkok, Thailand
- Party: People's Power (2007–2008)
- Other political affiliations: Democrat (1966–1976); Thai Citizen (1978–2001)
- Height: 1.79 m (5 ft 10 in)
- Spouse: Surat Sundaravej
- Education: Thammasat University; Chulalongkorn University; Bryant & Stratton College

Military service
- Allegiance: Thailand
- Branch/service: Volunteer Defense Corps
- Rank: VDC Gen. (Honour rank)

Samak Sundaravej (Thai: สมัคร สุนทรเวช, (Note: In this Thai name, the person is referred to by his given name, Samak, and not by his surname, Sundaravej.) RTGS: Samak Sunthorawet, pronounced [sā.màk sǔn.tʰɔ̄.rā.wêːt]; 13 June 1935 – 24 November 2009) was a Thai politician who briefly served as the Prime Minister of Thailand and Minister of Defence in 2008, as well as the leader of the People's Power Party in 2008.

== Early life and family ==
Samak was born in Bangkok, Thailand to Phraya Bamrungratchaboriphan (Samian Sundaravej) and his wife Khunying Amphan Bamrungratchaboriphan (née Amphan Chittakon). He was of Chinese ancestry (ancestral surname Lee (李)) and had five siblings. According to Samak himself, his Chinese ancestors came to Thailand in the late 18th century. Samak studied at Saint Gabriel's College and Assumption Commercial College, then graduated from Faculty of Law, Thammasat University. He also received diplomas from Chulalongkorn University and Bryant & Stratton College.

Besides being a politician, Samak was a well-known television chef. For seven years before the military coup of September 2006, he had hosted a cooking show called Tasting, Ranting on the Thailand ITV television network and on Royal Thai Army Radio and Television. He said when he became prime minister that he would resume his career as a TV chef and did so, though warned not to. It is illegal for a government minister to hold any other paying job, and on 9 September 2008, the full bench of the Constitutional Court ruled it was unconstitutional for him to work for a private company (Thailand ITV) and therefore disqualified him from office.

Samak was married to Khunying Surat Sundaravej, a financial adviser to the Charoen Pokphand Group. They had two children.

== Political career ==
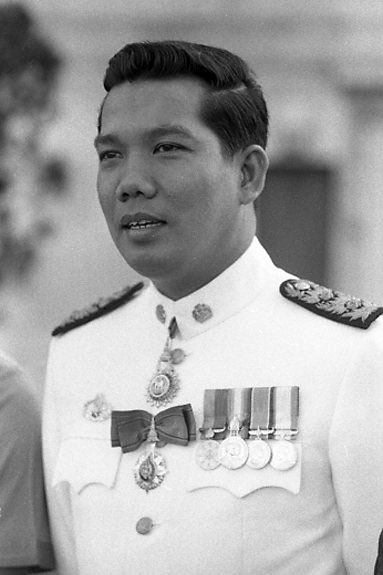
Samak Sundaravej (1976)

In 1968, Samak joined the opposition Democrat Party. Having strong ties to the military, Samak became head of the party's right-wing faction. In the 1976 general election, he defeated M. R. Kukrit Pramoj and became Deputy Interior Minister in the cabinet of M. R. Seni Pramoj. He quickly became prominent for arresting several allegedly leftist activists.

In late August 1976, Seni sent Samak to Singapore to try to persuade Field Marshal Thanom Kittikachorn not to return to Thailand. However, writer Paul M. Handley claims Samak was a close confidant of Queen Sirikit and was told to guarantee royal support for the exiled Field Marshal. This is apparently supported by Samak's claim during a cabinet meeting that the King had not opposed Thanom's return.

On 5 October, Samak was removed from his ministerial position, and in reaction organised an anti-government demonstration calling for the dismissal of three liberal Democrat ministers he branded as "communists". He was prominent in the events leading to the 6 October 1976 massacre at Thammasat University, in which leftist students protesting against the return of a former military dictator were killed by rightwing mobs. In interviews he gave to CNN and al-Jazeera in 2008, Samak denied any involvement in the attacks that left at least 46 dead, and he insisted only one person was killed intentionally.

Following 6 October 1976, Samak became Minister of the Interior in the administration of Tanin Kraivixien, an anti-Communist royalist with a reputation for honesty. Samak immediately launched a campaign that caused the arrest of hundreds of alleged leftists, including many writers and other intellectuals.

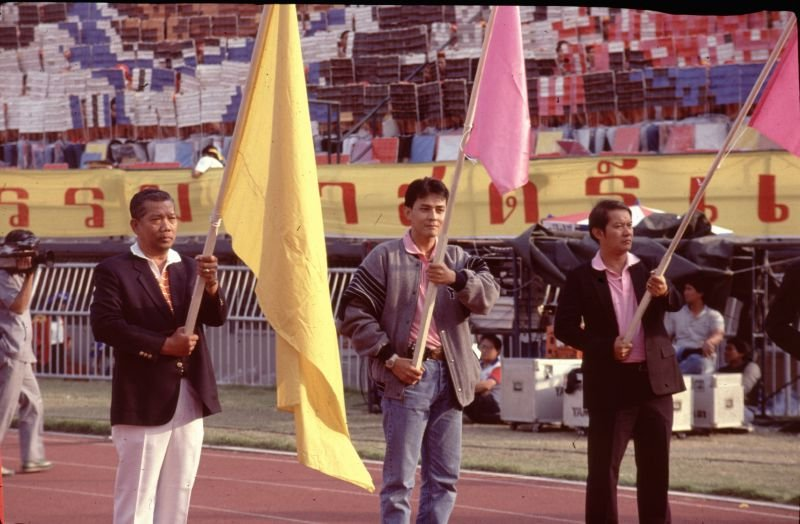
Samak (left) in 1980

In 1979, Samak founded the right-wing Thai Citizens' Party. In the 1979 General Elections, it defeated the incumbent Democrat Party by winning 29 of the 39 seats in Bangkok. In the 1983 General Elections, it extended its base to 36 seats, and did not suffer greatly from the Democrat surge in 1986.

In 1992, as Deputy Prime Minister in the military-appointed Suchinda administration, Samak justified the military's brutal suppression of pro-democracy demonstrators by declaring the government had the right to do so as long as the United States could send its troops to kill people in other countries, referring to the Gulf War which defeated Saddam Hussein's Iraq in 1991. He remained unrepentant and continued to stand by his justification, stating the military was merely trying to restore law and order after the pro-democracy demonstrators, whom he branded as "troublemakers", had resorted to "mob rule".

== Prime Minister of Thailand (2008) ==
From 2001 to 2006, Thai Rak Thai was the ruling party under Prime Minister Thaksin Shinawatra, its founder. In 2006 the military staged a bloodless coup to remove Thaksin, who was then acting as interim prime minister between elections, from power. His Thai Rak Thai party was dissolved on 30 May 2007 by the military appointed Constitutional Tribunal for violation of election laws. Members of the dissolved party immediately organised a new party called the People's Power Party.

In 2007, the People's Power Party came to power in the first election since the military coup the previous year. Samak, then the party's leader, became Prime Minister of Thailand. He was promptly accused of being a proxy for the exiled Thaksin, resulting in massive street protests by the People's Alliance for Democracy. He was convicted of libel on an old charge and was sentenced to two years in jail, though the sentence was suspended pending appeal. On 25 September 2008, the Appeals Court upheld the two-year jail sentence. Samak jumped bail and left for the United States to receive cancer treatment.

=== Censure (no-confidence) motion ===
The Democrat Party, led by Sathit Wongnongtoei, on 18 June 2008 submitted to Deputy House Speaker Somsak Kiartsuranan a censure motion of no-confidence against Samak Sundaravej and 7 cabinet ministers in the parliament, to oust his coalition government. The marathon debate was held on 28 June.

Amid 4 months in power and public street protests by the People's Alliance for Democracy (PAD), Samak and all 7 cabinet members survived the no-confidence motion. The 3 days of censure debate were finally terminated by the voting session on 27 June. As predicted by opposition leader Abhisit Vejjajiva, of 442 MPs present, Samak got 280 votes of confidence and 162 votes of no-confidence.

=== Resignations and impeachment ===
Samak Sundaravej's 5-month-old government was in great trouble on 10 July 2008 after Pattama the third top official in the ruling People Power Party (PPP) resigned from this post, effective Monday. The deputy leader of the party Yongyut Tiyapairat, was banned from politics for 5 years, after the Supreme Court affirmed vote buying charges against him. Then, Chiya Sasomsub was removed from office by another supreme court, for illegally concealing his wife's assets. The Constitutional Court ruled on 8 July that Noppadon and the entire cabinet violated the charter by failing to ask parliamentary approval for a Cambodia deal. Noppadon signed the agreement on June, to support Cambodia's bid to seek World Heritage status for the 900-year-old temple of Preah Vihear. The Opposition filed a petition with deputy Senate Speaker Nikom Wairatpanit to impeach Noppadon Pattama over Preah Vihear Temple issue. Sathit Wongnongtoei submitted 141 signatures of MPs. Noppadon was accused of violating Article 190 and 270 of the Constitution. The Opposition filed the motion before Noppadon stepped down.

=== 2008 political crisis ===
Although the campaigns demanding Samak resign from the premiership were abundant, he remarked, "I will never resign in response to these threats. I will not dissolve the House. I will meet the king today to report what's going on." Later Samak met with King Bhumibol Adulyadej at Hua Hin palace.

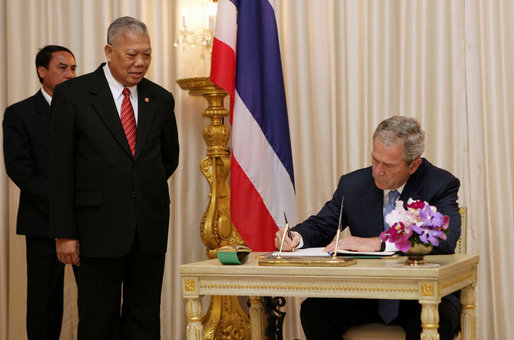
President George W. Bush signs guest book with Prime Minister Samak Sundaravej in the Ivory Room of the Government House

A few days after, 30,000 protesters led by the People's Alliance for Democracy occupied Samak's Government House compound in central Bangkok so as to force him and his advisers to work out of a military command post. Riot police entered the occupied compound and delivered a court order for the eviction of protesters. Chamlong Srimuang ordered 45 PAD guards to break into the main government building on Saturday. 3 regional airports remain closed and 35 trains between Bangkok and the provinces were cancelled. Protesters raided the Phuket International Airport tarmac on the resort island of Phuket Province resulting in 118 flights cancelled or diverted, affecting 15,000 passengers.

Protesters also blocked the entrance of the airports in Krabi and Hat Yai (which was later re-opened). Police issued arrest warrants for Sondhi Limthongkul and 8 other protest leaders on charges of insurrection, conspiracy, unlawful assembly and refusing orders to disperse. Meanwhile, Gen Anupong Paochinda stated: "The army will not stage a coup. The political crisis should be resolved by political means." Samak and the Thai Party ruling coalition called urgent parliamentary debate and session for 31 August.

On 2 September 2008, following the clashes between the pro and anti-government protesters which led to at least one pro government protesters death, Sundaravej declared a controversial state of emergency. The state of emergency was lifted on 14 September 2008.

On 9 September of the year, the Constitutional Court of Thailand delivered a decision disqualifying Sundaravej from the premiership in accordance with the complaints lodged by the Senators and the Election Commission of Thailand. However, Samak's People's Power Party vowed to vote him back to the premiership, and he did not decline this nomination for prime minister as Kuthep Suthin Klangsang, PPP's deputy spokesman, said in a press release on 12 September: "Samak has accepted his nomination for prime minister. Samak said he is confident that parliament will find him fit for office, and that he is happy to accept the post. A majority of party members voted Thursday to reappoint Samak. Samak is the leader of our party so he is the best choice."

Despite objections from its coalition partners, the PPP, in an urgent meeting, unanimously decided to renominate Samak Sundaravej. Five coalition parties, namely Chart Thai, Neutral Democratic, Pracharaj, Puea Pandin and Ruam Jai Thai Chart Pattana, unanimously agreed to support the People Power party (PPP) to set up the new government and vote for the person who should be nominated as the new prime minister. Chart Thai deputy leader Somsak Prissanananthakul and Ruam Jai Thai Chart Pattana leader Chettha Thanajaro said the next prime minister who will be nominated on Friday. Caretaker prime minister Somchai Wongsawat said PPP secretary-general Surapong Suebwonglee will notify the 5 parties who the PPP nominates to take office again. Some lawmakers, then said that they would propose an alternate candidate. Meanwhile, Thailand's army chief Gen. Anupong Paochinda said he backed the creation of a unity government that would include all the country's parties, and he also asked for the lifting of a state of emergency that Samak imposed on 2 September.

==== Abandonment ====
Embattled Samak abandoned his bid to regain his Thailand Prime Minister post, and Teerapon Noprampa said Samak would also give up the ruling People's Power Party (PPP) leadership.

Somchai Wongsawat – the fugitive ex-P.M. Thaksin Shinawatra's brother-in-law, was ratified by the National Assembly of Thailand as Prime Minister of Thailand on 17 September, winning 298 votes against 163 votes for Abhisit Vejjajiva.

== Court decision ==
The Senate President lodged a complaint with the Constitutional Court of Thailand (ConCourt) on 2 June 2008, and the Election Commission of Thailand (ECT) submitted a similar complaint 29 July 2008. The complaints requested the ConCourt to decide whether the premiership of Samak Sundaravej is terminated upon Section 91, Section 182 Paragraph One (7) and Section 267 of the Constitution of the Kingdom of Thailand (2007).

On 9 September 2008, 15.30 hours, the ConCourt with Justice Chat Chonlaworn sitting as the President rendered its decision as follows:

1. The essence of the first complaint (Senators' Complaint) could be summarised as follows: as Samak was a holder of the political position as a prime minister, he was under the subject of Section 267 of the Constitution of the Kingdom of Thailand (2007) prohibiting the Prime Minister and Ministers from having any position in a partnership, a company or an organisation carrying out business with a view to sharing profits or incomes or being an employee of any person. However, Samak, who acknowledged the purpose of Section 267, continued to work for the Face Media Co., Ltd. as emcee of two cookery shows, Chim Pai Bon Pai (Tasting and Grumbling) and Yok Khayong Hok Mong Chao (All Set at 6 am), and ceased from such works just when the ECT received a complaint concerning the case. Therefore, the Senators exercised their right under Section 91 requesting the President of the Senate to submit their complaint to the ConCourt to make a decision as said.

2. The essence of the second complaint (ECT's Complaint) could be summarised as follows: On 17 April 2008, Senator Ruangkrai Leekijwattana lodged with the ECT a complaint that Samak, pending his premiership, worked for Face Media Co., Ltd. which was a private company having commercial purpose. This was in breach of Section 267 of the Constitution of the Kingdom of Thailand (2007) and led to the termination of his premiership as of the date the said prohibited act was performed. The ECT has appointed an inquisitorial panel to look into the case and discovered that it was a prima facie case, so it unanimously resolved to forward the case to the ConCourt to make a decision as said.

3. Samak, after having received a quo warranto, represented to the accusation through submitting the letters dated 30 June 14 and 25 August 2008 to the ConCourt, stated that:

- 3.1) he received no remuneration for being the emcee of both cookery TV programmes, but only 5,000 Baht as travelling costs.
- 3.2) he held no interests, shares or positions in the Face Media Co., Ltd. as well as received no salaries or other benefits from the said company.
- 3.3) as being the emcee of both programmes, he has been invited, not employed. This meant he was not an employee under the definition prescribed in the Labour Protection Act, BE 2541 (1998) and the Announcement of the Ministry of Interior Re: Labour Protection (No. 111).
- 3.4) as he has been seen on the said programmes after having assumed the premiership, those shows were pre-recorded for months and he has already ceased from being the emcee prior to having been in office.

4. The Constitutional Court considered that:

- 4.1) The spirit of this Constitution is to prevent against the conflict of interest which may cause the condition of misconduct—the condition compelled to choose between self-interest and public interest—to be occurred. Should a holder of the position offered by the public be mindful on his own interest beyond the public interest, he could conduct an abuse of his power. Therefore, the accomplishment of the spirit of the Constitution is not only to construct the term "employee" through the definition under the Civil and Commercial Code, the law on labour protection or the law on taxation, as each law contains different spirit and purposes of enforcement; as well as the said laws are at the lower class than the Constitution. The term "employee" under the Constitution holds broader meaning than that of any other laws, and should be interpreted in a general path. For which the Official Dictionary of Thai Words by the Royal Institute, 1999 Version defined the term "employee" that "a person who works for any job; a person who agrees to work for other person, irrespective of how he is called."
- 4.2) Samak gave an interview in the Sakul Thai Magazine vol 47 (Tuesday 23 October 2001) pp 37 that he was monthly paid 80,000 Baht for being the emcee of the said programmes. And pursuant to the letter Samak replied to the Face Media Co., Ltd. on 25 December 2007 that he will do this work [being the emcee] without receiving anything as usual, this kind of letter has never been made by Samak prior to being enquired by the ECT. As well as the affirmation of Samak that he had received only the travelling costs from the Company was in contrary to the witnesses' testimonies and to the taxation evidences showing that what Samak previously received was the payments for working, not only the travelling costs as he represented.
- 4.3) As Samak defended himself that the programmes aired after he was in office and were pre-recorded months before he came in; however, in one of the said programmes Samak stated that: "... Came again those people who wanted to find a person to replace Mr Samak as boisterously appeared on the news. Yes, that group, the group which delivered an ultimatum to Mr Samak to resign. They newly discovered that the programme 'Tasting and Grumbling' was in breach of law. Because, as I assumed the premiership ... and you know, they said that it [the Constitution] told that I was unable to be a temporary employee, permanent employee ... But, I have to fill my words into your ears that after having been in the premiership for three months, I am engaging in such work still. Because I have got some counsels from the top legal advisers that ..." This was a defence contrary per se.
- 4.4) These were the clear traces of guilt. According to the conclusion of fact, it could be concluded that Samak was an employee to the said Company. Moreover, three Constitutional judges deemed that Samak portrait and the picture of rose apple mocking Samak’s nose using as a logo of the "Tasting and Grumbling" programme as well the status of being an emcee and the use of the name "Tasting and Grumbling", a popular quote of Samak, were the acts of engaging in a joint affair with a commercial purpose which were in breach of Section 267 of the Constitution. And another six judges deemed that it was not necessary to further decide as to what position Samak held in the said Company, as he was manifestly breached the law.

5. Therefore, the ConCourt, by the unanimous resolution, held that Samak has performed the acts in breach of Section 267 of the Constitution of the Kingdom of Thailand (2007) which individually led to the termination of his premiership in accordance with Section 182 Paragraph One (7) of which, and called forth the vacating from office of the entire Council of Ministers under Section 180 Paragraph One (1). However, as the premiership has individually been terminated, all Ministers other than Samak could remain in office as a caretaker government and continuing their functions until the new Council of Ministers is sworn in.

=== Reactions following the decision delivery ===
Karn Tienkaew, deputy leader of Samak's People's Power Party, said it planned to propose a parliamentary vote Wednesday on returning Samak to power: "Samak still has legitimacy. The party still hopes to vote him back unless he says no. Otherwise we have many other capable candidates."

On 10 September 2008, however, the PPP shied away from their earlier statement they would renominate Samak and was apparently looking for an alternative candidate instead; with the new PM then scheduled to have bern nominated on 12 September 2008.

People Power Party's deputy spokesman Kuthep Suthin Klangsang, on 12 September 2008, announced that: "Samak has accepted his nomination for prime minister. Samak said he is confident that parliament will find him fit for office, and that he is happy to accept the post. A majority of party members voted Thursday to reappoint Samak. Samak is the leader of our party so he is the best choice." Despite objections from its coalition partners, the PPP, in an urgent meeting, unanimously decided to renominate Samak Sundaravej. 5 coalition parties, namely Chart Thai, Matchima Thipataya, Pracharaj, Puea Pandin and Ruam Jai Thai Chart Pattana, unanimously agreed to support the People Power party (PPP) to set up the new government and vote for the person who should be nominated as the new prime minister. Chart Thai deputy leader Somsak Prissananantakul and Ruam Jai Thai Chart Pattana leader Chettha Thanajaro said the next prime minister who will be nominated on Friday. Caretaker prime minister Somchai Wongsawat said PPP secretary-general Surapong Suebwonglee will notify the 5 parties who the PPP nominates to take office again. Some lawmakers, however, said they will propose an alternate candidate. Meanwhile, Thailand's army chief Gen. Anupong Paochinda said he backed the creation of a unity government that would include all the country's parties, and he also asked for the lifting of a state of emergency that Samak imposed on 2 September.

The legal reasoning of the decision was also discussed in a Harvard Law School dissertation a full copy of which is available to the public.

== Disapproval of Samak ==
On 12 September 2008, however, the Isan faction of People Power Party (PPP) and the coalition parties boycotted the vote on a new prime minister, resulting in a lack of quorum and subsequent postponement of the vote.

The boycott was a sign of the depth of ill-feeling towards Samak from both his own party's members and coalition parties. Finally, Samak gave up his re-election bid, allowing his party to choose new a nominee. The majority of his party and the coalition partners eventually voted for Somchai Wongsawat, Deputy Prime Minister, to be the new premier.

== Political profile ==
- Member of Democrat Party (1968–1976)
- Member of Parliament (1973–1975, 1976, 1979–1983, 1986–1990, 1992–2000, 2008)
- Founder and Leader of Prachakorn Thai Party (Thai Citizens' Party) (1979–2000)
- Deputy Minister of Agriculture and Cooperatives (1975)
- Deputy Minister of Interior (1976)
- Minister of Interior (1976–1977)
- Minister of Transport (1983–1986, 1990–1991)
- Governor of Bangkok (2000–2004)
- Senator-elected (2006; later nullified by coup d'état)
- Leader of People's Power Party (2007–2008)
- Prime Minister (2008)

== Leader of the PPP ==
On 29 July 2007, some former members of the Thai Rak Thai Party MPs agreed to contest the 2007 election as candidates of the People's Power Party. This was after the Thai Rak Thai Party was dissolved by the Thai Supreme Court on 30 May 2007 and followed the ban on participating in politics for many former TRT party politicians, such as Newin Chidchob, Buriram and former prime minister Thaksin Shinawatra. Many other former TRT members have also formed their own parties, such as the Ruam Jai Thai and Puea Pandin parties.

Samak Sundaravej and former TRT Cabinet Minister Surapong Suebwonglee were elected People's Power Party leader and secretary general respectively on 24 August 2007. It was, also, widely known that Thaksin chose him to be the new head of his former party's members.

On 23 December 2007 General Election the PPP won 228 seats, sufficient to win the election ahead of the Democrat Party but short of the 241 seats needed for a majority of the 480-seat house. He was able to form a six-party coalition, however, gaining a parliamentary majority of about two-thirds.

In a parliamentary vote on 28 January 2008, Samak was elected prime minister, receiving 310 votes against 163 for Abhisit Vejjejava of the Democrat Party. He was endorsed as prime minister by the king on the next day. On 6 February, his Cabinet, including himself as Minister of Defense, was endorsed by the king and sworn in. Samak angrily insisted he was the country's real leader on 29 February 2008 despite the triumphant return from exile of deposed premier Thaksin Shinawatra, the man considered the driving force behind the new government.

Samak Sundaravej ended his campaign to regain his position on 12 September 2008. Mr Samak's decision was revealed on 11 September by Theerapol Nopparampa, his close aide, after he spent about 50 minutes meeting Mr Samak at his home and he told AP that Samak told him to tell "every reporter that he is going to step down from being the party leader and he will not accept the prime ministership." The ruling People's Power Party said earlier it was abandoning its bid to install Samak back in power. The announcements raise hopes of ending a political crisis buffeting the country. Leaders of the People Power Party had said since Tuesday that they would seek to restore Samak, but they need to convince five other parties in the coalition to go along with that choice. Some lawmakers have indicated they will propose an alternate candidate.

== Death ==
At age 73, Samak admitted he had liver cancer and underwent laser surgery to remove a tumour and was treated at Bumrungrad International Hospital on 2 October 2008. He was discharged on 25 October. On the morning of 24 November 2009, it was reported that at 8:48 am Samak had died at Bumrungrad International Hospital of liver cancer at the age of 74. Thaksin Shinawatra, former Thai Prime Minister, said "My family and I express profound sorrow for the passing away of HE (His Excellency) Samak but I will not be able to attend his funeral." Samak's funeral was held at Wat Benchamabophit and his cremation was held at Wat Debsirin. Crown Prince Maha Vajiralongkorn presided over the ceremonies, representing the King and Queen. His ashes were scattered in Sattahip Bay in a final ceremony.

== Honours ==
=== Royal decorations ===
Samak has received the following royal decorations in the Honours System of Thailand:

- Knight Grand Cordon (Special Class) of the Most Exalted Order of the White Elephant
- Knight Grand Cordon (Special Class) of The Most Noble Order of the Crown of Thailand
- Knight Grand Cross (First Class) of the Most Admirable Order of the Direkgunabhorn
- Knight Grand Commander (Second Class, higher grade) of the Most Illustrious Order of Chula Chom Klao
- Border Service Medal
- Second Class of the Boy Scout Commendation Medal
- King Bhumibol Adulyadej Royal Cypher Medal

=== Foreign Honours ===
- Philippines :
  - Grand Collar of the Order of Sikatuna (GCS)
- Japan :
  - Grand Cordon of the Order of the Rising Sun
- Denmark :
  - Commander 1st Class of the Order of the Dannebrog (2001)
- Netherlands :
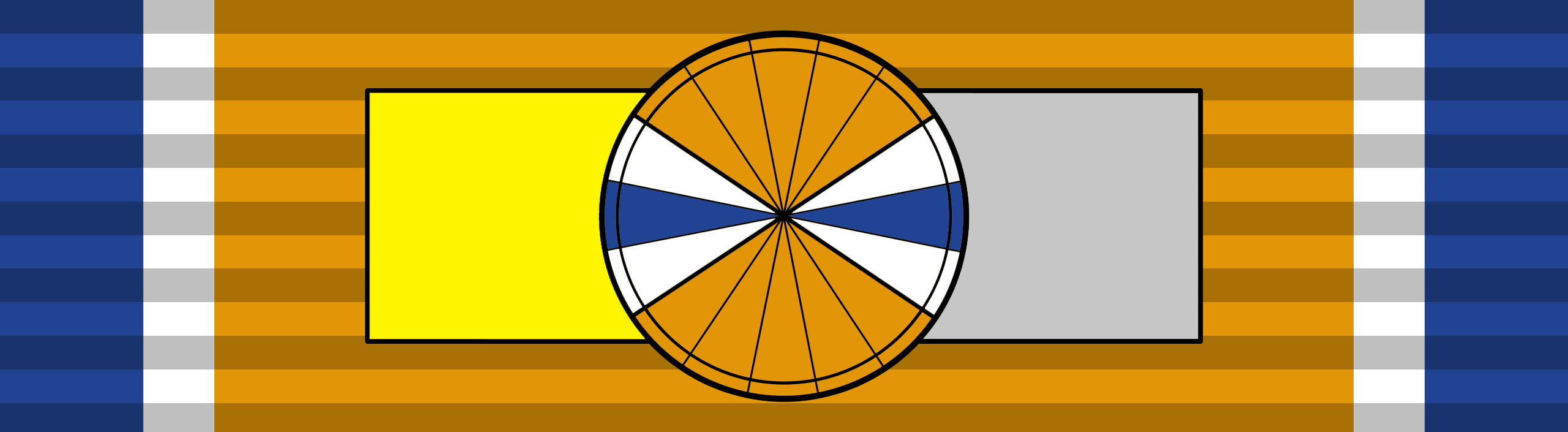
  - Grand Officer of the Order of Orange-Nassau (2003)

== Samak cabinet ==
This Cabinet was active from 6 February 2008 to 24 September 2008

Position	Name	Party
Prime Minister and Minister of Defence	Samak Sundaravej	PPP
Deputy Prime Minister and Minister of Education	Somchai Wongsawat	PPP
Deputy Prime Minister and Minister of Commerce	Mingkwan Saengsuwan	PPP
Deputy Prime Minister and Minister of Finance	Surapong Suebwonglee	PPP
Deputy Prime Minister	Sahat Banditkul	–
Deputy Prime Minister	Sanan Kachornprasart	CTP
Deputy Prime Minister and Minister for Industry	Suwit Khunkitti	Puea Pandin Party
Minister for Office of the Prime Minister	Choosak Sirinin	PPP
Minister for Office of the Prime Minister	Jakrapob Penkair	PPP
Minister of Agriculture	Somsak Prissanananthakul	CTP
Deputy Minister of Agriculture	Sompat Kaewpichit	CTP
Deputy Minister of Agriculture	Teerachai Saenkaew	PPP
Deputy Minister of Commerce	Banyin Tangphakorn	MCMP
Deputy Minister of Commerce	Virun Techapaibul	PPP
Minister of Culture	Anusorn Wongwan	PPP
Deputy Minister of Education	Boonlue Prasertsopha	PPP
Deputy Minister of Education	Pongsakorn Annopporn	PPP
Minister for Energy	Lieutenant General Poonpirom Litapanlop	RJCPP
Deputy Minister of Finance	Pradit Pattaraprasit	RJCPP
Deputy Minister of Finance	Ranongrak Suwanchawee	Puea Pandin Party
Minister of Foreign Affairs	Noppadon Pattama	PPP
Minister of Information and Communication Technology	Man Pattanotai	Puea Pandin Party
Minister of Interior	Pol Cpt Chalerm Yubamrung	PPP
Deputy Minister of Interior	Sithichai Kowsurat	Puea Pandin Party
Deputy Minister of Interior	Suphol Fongngam	PPP
Minister of Justice	Sompong Amornwiwat	PPP
Minister of Labour	Uraiwan Thienthong	PRP
Minister for Natural Resource and Environment	Anongwan Thepsuthin	MCMP
Minister of Public Health	Chaiya Sasomsap	PPP
Deputy Minister of Public Health	Chaovarat Chanweerakul	PPP
Minister for Science and Technology	Wutthipong Chaisang	PPP
Minister for Social Development and Human Security	Sutha Chansaeng	PPP
Minister of Tourism and Sports	Weerasak Kowsurat	CTP
Minister of Transport	Santi Promphat	PPP
Deputy Minister of Transport	Songsak Thongsri	PPP
Deputy Minister of Transport	Anurak Jureemas	CTP

== See also ==
- Samak Interview on Al Jazeera
- Cabinet of Thailand

== Notes ==
Political offices
Preceded by Bhichit Rattakul	Governor of Bangkok; 2000–2004	Succeeded by Apirak Kosayodhin

Political offices
Preceded by Thaloeng Thamrongnawasawat; Phanlert Buranasilpin	Deputy Minister of Agriculture and Cooperatives of Thailand; 1975 with Kraisorn Tantipong; Phan Sirivejjabhandu	Succeeded by Dabchai Akkharat; Anan Pakprapai
Preceded by Bunlert Lertpricha; Prakob Prayunphokarat	Deputy Minister of Interior of Thailand; 1976 with Khunthong Phuphiwduean; Sombun Sirithorn; Chusa-nga Ritthiprasan	Succeeded by Khunthong Phuphiwduean; Phan Sirivejjabhandu; Dabchai Akkharat
Vacant Title last held by Seni Pramoj	Minister of Interior of Thailand; 1976–1977	Vacant Title next held by Kriangsak Chamanan
Preceded by Amorn Sirigaya	Minister of Transport of Thailand; 1983–1986	Succeeded by Banharn Silpa-archa
Preceded by Montri Pongpanich	Minister of Transport of Thailand; 1990–1991	Vacant Title next held by Nukul Prachuabmoh
Preceded by Sanoh Unakul; Pao Sarasin; Meechai Ruchuphan	Deputy Prime Minister of Thailand; 1992 with Meechai Ruchuphan; Narong Wongwan; Sombun Rahong; Montri Pongpanich	Succeeded by Pao Sarasin; Kasem Suwankul; Kasemsamosorn Kasemsri
Preceded by Banyat Bantadtan; Supachai Panitchpakdi; Arthit Kamlang-ek	Deputy Prime Minister of Thailand; 1995–1996 with Sombun Rahong; Chavalit Yongchaiyudh; Thaksin Shinawatra; Bunphan Kaewattana; Amnuay Viravan	Succeeded by Sombun Rahong; Chavalit Yongchaiyudh; Amnuay Viravan; Thaksin Shinawatra
Preceded by Sombun Rahong; Chavalit Yongchaiyudh; Amnuay Viravan; Thaksin Shinawatra	Deputy Prime Minister of Thailand; 1996–1997 with Sombun Rahong; Chavalit Yongchaiyudh; Amnuay Viravan; Thaksin Shinawatra; Kasemsamosorn Kasemsri; Montri Pongpanich; Sukavich Rangsitpol; Korn Dabbaransi; Wiraphong Ramangkun; Suwit Khunkitti	Succeeded by Bhichai Rattakul; Supachai Panitchpakdi; Panja Kesornthong; Suwit Khunkitti
Preceded by Bhichit Rattakul	Governor of Bangkok; 2000–2004	Succeeded by Apirak Kosayodhin
Preceded by Surayud Chulanont	Prime Minister of Thailand; 2008	Vacant Somchai Wongsawat (Acting) Title next held by Somchai Wongsawat
Preceded by Bunrod Somthat	Minister of Defence of Thailand; 2008	Vacant Title next held by Somchai Wongsawat
Assembly seats
New title	Members of the House of Representatives for Bangkok, 6 District; 1975–1976 with Seni Pramoj; Phiphop Asitirat	Succeeded by Nitipat Chaleejan; Thong Thanakarn; Watchari Uthaichaloem
Preceded by Prakob Prayunphokarat; Pratuan Rommayanon; Kukrit Pramoj	Members of the House of Representatives for Bangkok, 1 District; 1976 with Thawit Seniwong na Ayutthaya; Prathet Rommayanon	Vacant Title next held by himself Buntiam Khemarat; Siri Thiraphan
Vacant Title last held by himself Thawit Seniwong na Ayutthaya; Prathet Rommayanon	Members of the House of Representatives for Bangkok, 1 District; 1979–1991 with Buntiam Khemarat; Siri Thiraphan; Chukiat Pramuanphon; Chitphon Na Lampang; Lalita Rerksamran	Vacant Title next held by himself Winai Sompong; Lalita Rerksamran
Vacant Title last held by himself Lalita Rerksamran; Chitphon Na Lampang	Members of the House of Representatives for Bangkok, 1 District; 1992–2000 with Winai Sompong; Lalita Rerksamran; Akorn Hoontrakul; Decho Sawananon; Thawatchai Sajakul	Succeeded by Siri Wangbunkoet; Krisada Sajakul; Lalita Rerksamran
Party political offices
New title	Leader of Thai Citizen Party; 1979–2000	Succeeded by Sumit Sundaravej
Preceded by Suphaphon Tiankaew	Leader of People's Power Party; 2007–2008	Succeeded by Somchai Wongsawat
