= Jamsai Silpa-archa =

Khun Ying Jamsai Silpa-archa
- แจ่มใส ศิลปอาชา
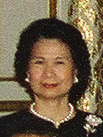
- Jamsai in 1996
- Born: Jamsai Lekhawat; 20 April 1934 (age 92); Suphan Buri, Thailand
- Occupation: Philanthropist (established Chalerm Patthara Rachini Park)
- Known for: Banharn Silpa-archa's wife
- Spouse: Banharn Silpa-archa
- Children: Varawut Silpa-archa; Kanchana Silpa-archa; Parichat Silpa-archa
- Parents: Nguan Lekhawat (father); Thapthim Lekhawat (mother)

Khun Ying Jamsai Silpa-archa (née Lekhawat; (Thai: เลขวัต}; IPA: [leː.kʰà.wát]); Thai: แจ่มใส ศิลปอาชา, RTGS: Chaemsai Sinlapa-a-cha; IPA: [t͡ɕɛ̀m.sǎj sǐn.lá.pà.ʔaː.t͡ɕʰaː]; born 20 April 1934), is the widow of Banharn Silpa-archa, the 21st Prime Minister of Thailand and Thai Nation Party Leader. They have three children: one son, Varawut (married to Suwanna Raiwin), and two daughters, Kanchana and Parichat.

== Education and career ==
Jamsai graduated from Phadungsil School in 1944 and graduated from Sanguan Ying School in 1947. She was a founder of Banharn-Jamsai Silpa-archa Foundation to provide educational opportunities to students in Suphanburi province.

== Royal decorations ==
- Order of the White Elephant Benchamaphon Chang Phueak
- Order of the Crown of Thailand Tritaphon Mongkut Thai
- Order of the Crown of Thailand Prathamaphon Mongkut Thai
- Order of Chula Chom Klao Chatutot Chunlachomklao
- Order of the White Elephant Prathamaphon Chang Phueak
- Order of the Crown of Thailand Maha Wachira Mongkut
- Order of the White Elephant Maha Paramaphon Chang Phueak
- Order of the Direkgunabhorn Pathama Direkkhunaphon
- Order of Chula Chom Klao Tatiya Chunlachomklao

== See also ==
- Banharn Silpa-archa
- Banharn-Jamsai Tower

Honorary titles
Preceded by Pakdiporn Sucharitakul	Spouse of Prime Minister of Thailand; 1995–2000	Succeeded by Pankruea Yongchaiyudh
