= Ministry of Social Development and Human Security (Thailand) =

Government ministry of Thailand

- กระทรวงการพัฒนาสังคมและความมั่นคงของมนุษย์
- Seal of the Lord of Creatures

- Flag of the Lord of Creatures

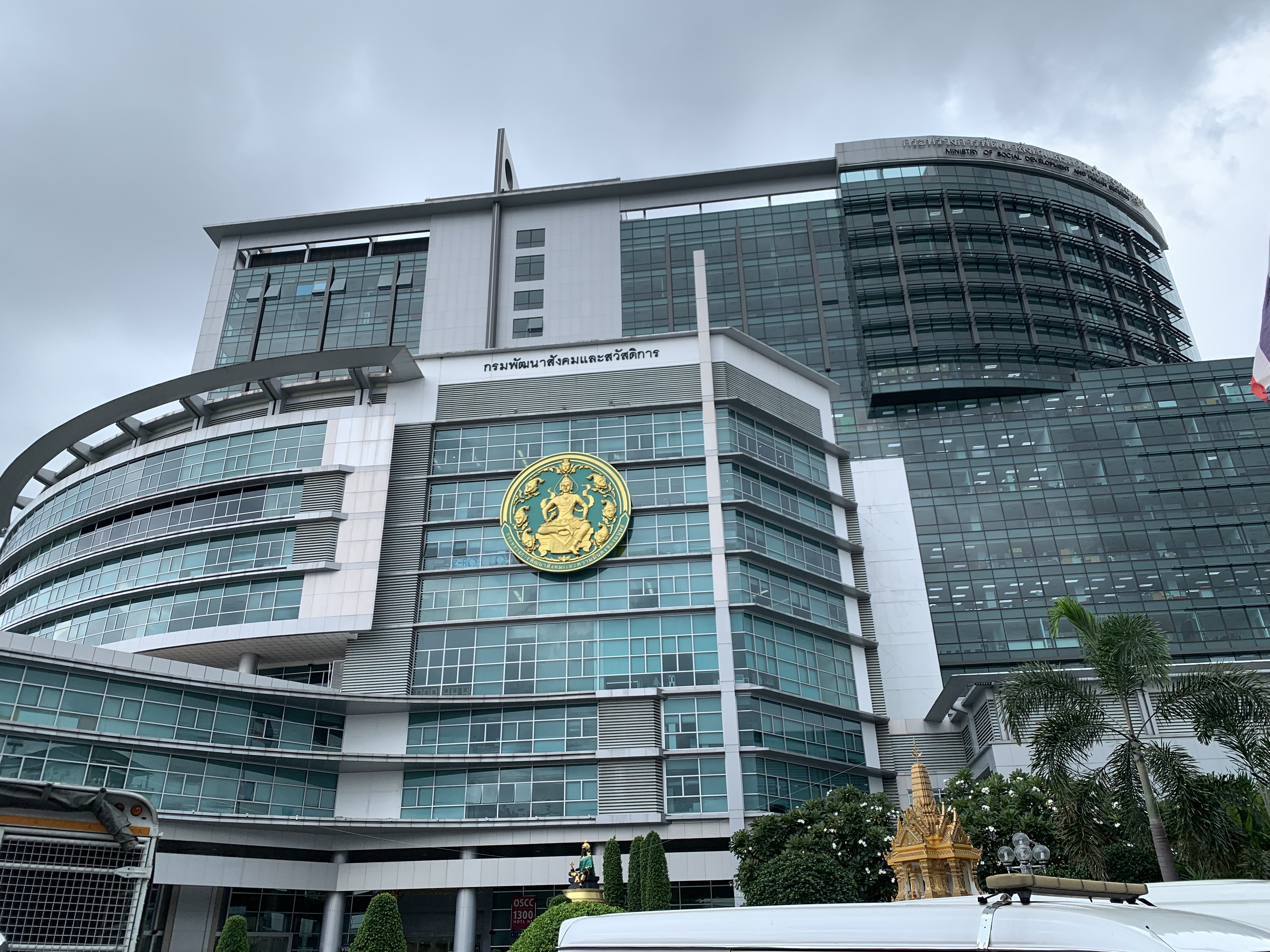
- Ministry HQ in 2021

Ministry overview
- Formed: 3 October 2002; 23 years ago
- Jurisdiction: Government of Thailand
- Headquarters: Pom Prap Sattru Phai, Bangkok
- Annual budget: 13,342 million baht (FY2019)
- Minister responsible: Nikorn Soemklang, Minister
- Ministry executive: Anukul Peedkaew, Permanent Secretary
- Website: www.m-society.go.th

The Ministry of Social Development and Human Security (Abrv: MSDHS; Thai: กระทรวงการพัฒนาสังคมและความมั่นคงของมนุษย์, RTGS: Krasuang Kan Phatthana Sangkhom Lae Khwam Mankhong Khong Manut), is a Thai governmental body responsible for ensuring the welfare of the Thai people. As of 1 September 2023, the minister responsible is Varawut Silpa-archa.

== Background ==
The Ministry of Social Development and Human Security (MSDHS) is a Thai government ministry created by the Restructuring of Government Agencies Act of 2002 in 2003 during the administration of Prime Minister Thaksin Shinawatra.

== Budget ==
The MSDHS fiscal year 2019 budget is 13,342 million baht, down from 13,718 million baht in FY2018.

== Organization ==
=== Administration ===
- Office of the Minister
- Office of the Permanent Secretary

=== Dependent departments ===
- Department of Social Development and Welfare
- Department of Children and Youth
- Department of Older Persons
- Department of Women's Affairs and Family Development
- Department of Empowerment of Persons With Disabilities
- Youth Housing Council

=== State enterprises ===
- National Housing Authority
- Office of the Government Pawnshop

=== Public organization ===
- Community Organizations Development Institute

== List of ministers ==
	Name	Took office	Left office	Cabinet	Ref
1	Anurak Jureimas	3 October 2002	8 November 2003	Thaksin	
2	Sora-at Klinprathum	8 November 2003	10 March 2005	Thaksin	
3	Pracha Maleenont	11 March 2005	1 August 2005	Thaksin	
4	Watana Muangsook	2 August 2005	8 October 2006	Thaksin	
5	Paiboon Wattanasiritham	9 October 2006	6 February 2008	Surayud	
6	Sutha Chansaeng	6 February 2008	8 May 2008	Samak	
7	Chawarat Chanwareekul	24 May 2008	2 August 2008	Samak	
8	Anusorn Wongwan	5 August 2008	23 September 2008	Samak	
9	Udomdet Rattansathien	24 September 2008	20 December 2008	Somchai	
10	Witoon Nambut	24 December 2008	3 February 2009	Somchai	
11	Issara Somchai	11 February 2009	8 August 2011	Abhisit	
12	Santi Promphat	9 August 2011	30 June 2013	Yingluck I, II, III	
13	Paweena Hongsakul	1 July 2013	22 July 2014	Yingluck IV	
14	Police General Adul Saengsingkaew	30 August 2014	23 November 2017	First Prayut	
15	General Anantaporn Kanchanarat	24 November 2017	8 May 2019	First Prayut	
16	Juti Krairiksh	10 July 2019	31 August 2023	Second Prayut	
17	Varawut Silpa-archa	1 September 2023	18 September 2025	Srettha	
17	Varawut Silpa-archa	1 September 2023	18 September 2025	Paetongtarn	
18	Akara Prompow	19 September 2025	30 March 2026	First Anutin	
19	Nikorn Somklang	30 March 2026	Incumbent	Second Anutin	

== See also ==
- List of government ministries of Thailand
