= Banharn Silpa-archa =

Prime Minister of Thailand from 1995 to 1996

Banharn Silpa-archa ThCh MPCh MVM PBh
- บรรหาร ศิลปอาชา 馬德祥
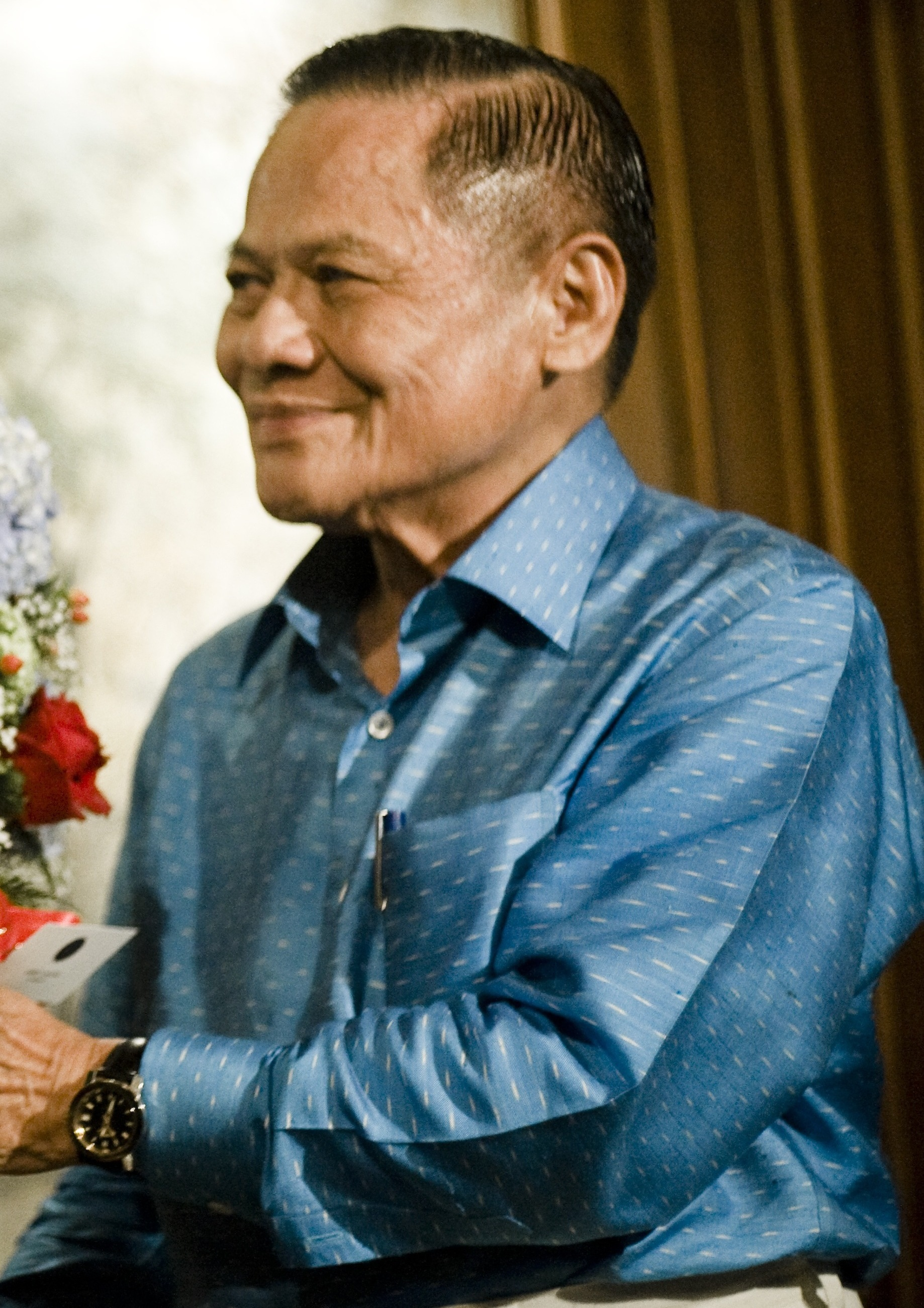
- Banharn in 2010

21st Prime Minister of Thailand
- In office 13 July 1995 – 25 November 1996
- Monarch: Bhumibol Adulyadej
- Deputy: See list: Somboon Rahong; Chavalit Yongchaiyudh; Thaksin Shinawatra; Boonpan Kaewattana; Samak Sundaravej; Amnuay Viravan; Kasem Samosorn Kasemsri; Montree Pongpanich
- Preceded by: Chuan Leekpai
- Succeeded by: Chavalit Yongchaiyudh

Leader of the Opposition
- In office 27 May 1994 – 19 May 1995
- Prime Minister: Chuan Leekpai
- Preceded by: Pramarn Adireksarn
- Succeeded by: Chuan Leekpai
Ministerial offices
Minister of Transport
In office 7 April 1992 – 9 June 1992
Prime Minister	Suchinda Kraprayoon
Preceded by	Nukul Prachuabmoh
Succeeded by	Nukul Prachuabmoh
In office 5 August 1986 – 3 August 1988
Prime Minister	Prem Tinsulanonda
Preceded by	Samak Sundaravej
Succeeded by	Montri Pongpanich
Minister of Finance
In office 14 December 1990 – 23 February 1991
Prime Minister	Chatichai Choonhavan
Preceded by	Veeraopng Ramangkoon
Succeeded by	Sutee Singsane
Minister of Interior
In office 9 January 1990 – 9 December 1990
Prime Minister	Chatichai Choonhavan
Preceded by	Pramarn Adireksarn
Succeeded by	Pramarn Adireksarn
Minister of Industry
In office 9 August 1988 – 9 January 1990
Prime Minister	Chatichai Choonhavan
Preceded by	Pramual Sabhavasu
Succeeded by	Pramarn Adireksarn
Minister of Agriculture and Cooperatives
In office 3 March 1980 – 4 March 1981
Prime Minister	Prem Tinsulanonda
Preceded by	Kriangsak Chamanan
Succeeded by	Arnat Arpapirom
Deputy Minister of Industry
In office 21 April 1976 – 6 October 1976
Prime Minister	Seni Pramoj

Leader of the Thai Nation Party
- In office 17 May 1994 – 2 December 2008
- Preceded by: Pramarn Adireksarn
- Succeeded by: party dissolved

Member of the House of Representatives for Suphan Buri province
- In office 24 April 1983 – 2 December 2008
- Preceded by: Thongyod Jittaveera
- Succeeded by: Noppadol Matsri
- In office 4 April 1976 – 6 October 1976
- Preceded by: Booneua Prasertsuwan
- Succeeded by: Chumpol Silpa-archa

Personal details
- Born: Tekchiang Saebe; 19 August 1932 Doem Bang Nang Buat, Suphan Buri, Thailand
- Died: 23 April 2016 (aged 83) Siriraj Piyamaharajkarun Hospital, Bangkok Noi, Bangkok, Thailand
- Party: Thai Nation (Chart Thai) (1974–2008); Chart Thai Pattana (2009–2016)
- Spouse: Jamsai Silpa-archa
- Children: Varawut Silpa-archa; Kanchana Silpa-archa; Parichat Silpa-archa
- Relatives: Chumpol Silpa-archa (brother)
- Profession: Businessman; politician
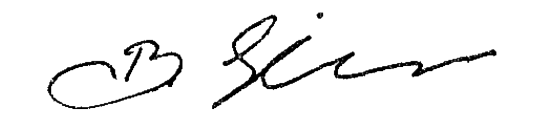
- Signature

Military service
- Allegiance: Thailand
- Branch/service: Volunteer Defense Corps
- Years of service: 1990-2016
- Rank: VDC Gen. (Honour Rank)

Banharn Silpa-archa (Thai: บรรหาร ศิลปอาชา, RTGS: Banhan Sinlapa-acha, Thai pronunciation: [ban.hǎːn sǐn.lá.pà.ʔaː.t͡ɕʰaː]; Chinese: 馬德祥, Mǎ Déxiáng; 19 August 1932 – 23 April 2016) was a Thai politician who served as the Prime Minister of Thailand from 1995 to 1996. Banharn made a fortune in the construction business before he became a Member of Parliament representing his home province of Suphan Buri. He held different cabinet posts in several governments. In 1994, he became the leader of the Thai Nation Party. In 2008, the party was dissolved by the Constitutional Court and Banharn was banned from politics for five years.

== Early life, education, and business career ==
Banharn was born on 19 August 1932 in Suphan Buri to a Teochew Chinese merchant family. His birth name was Tekchiang Saebe (Chinese: 馬德祥; pinyin: Mǎ Déxiáng; Thai: เต็กเชียง แซ่เบ๊). He married Khunying Jamsai Silpa-archa and they have three children.

Banharn dropped out of secondary school during World War II. He went to work with his older brother, then founded his own building company. Years later, when he was a politician, he completed his education at the open admissions Ramkhamhaeng University, graduating with a Bachelor of Laws degree in 1986, and finally a Master of Laws.

Banharn's construction company was very successful in the 1960s, when large sums were invested in major infrastructure projects, including military facilities. His business made Banharn a billionaire.

== Political career ==
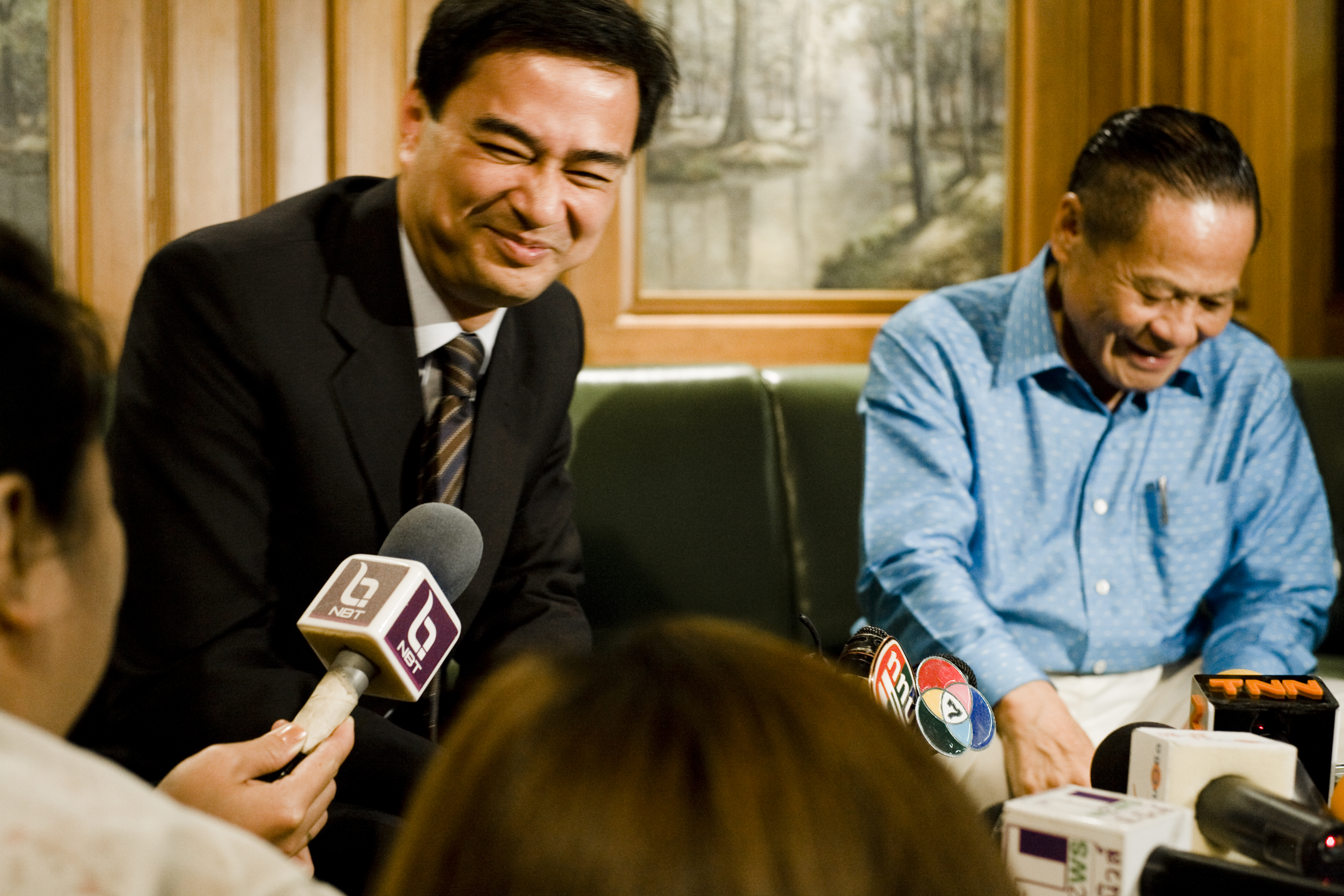
Abhisit Vejjajiva and Banharn Silpa-archa (right)

Banharn Silpa-archa was persuaded to enter politics by Booneua Prasertsuwan, a veteran member of the House of Representatives. In 1976, Banharn Silpa-archa made his political debut when he was elected a Member of Parliament, representing Suphan Buri Province. He joined the Thai Nation Party, a conservative party dominated by the "Rajakru clan" around Pramarn Adireksarn and Chatichai Choonhavan. His party participated in a coalition government under Prime Minister Seni Pramoj and Banharn was appointed deputy minister of industry. He was elected to the Senate in 1977, but returned to represent his constituency in the House of Representatives the next year. Banharn was re-elected Member of Parliament for Suphan Buri in all following elections, receiving steadily more than 100,000 votes (60 to 90 percent of the votes cast), which made him one of the highest vote-getters in the country.

He sponsored the construction of schools, bridges, and other infrastructure in his home province, which in turn were named after him. This has led to the common saying that he "owns the province". When his party was a junior partner in the government of Prem Tinsulanonda from 1980 to 1983, Banharn was Minister of Agriculture. In 1981, he became secretary-general of the Thai Nation Party. Banharn, being one of the main financiers of the party, accumulated considerable influence inside the party, although he was not a member of the originally dominant Rajakru clan. The local press has once dubbed him "Mr. (Mobile) ATM" (automated teller machine), due to the suspicion that he had bought the loyalty of political associates in exchange for money.

In 1986 Prime Minister Prem again called him up to the government, this time naming him Minister of Transport. After his party had won the elections in 1988 and Thai Nation leader Chatichai Choonhavan had become Prime Minister, Banharn was appointed Minister of Industry. In January 1990, he switched offices with Pramarn Adireksarn and became interior minister. In December of the same year, Chatichai made him Minister of Finance. The Chatichai government was deposed by a military coup d'état in 1991. Banharn returned to the cabinet as early as April 1992, when he once again became Minister of Transport in the short-lived government of General Suchinda Kraprayoon. His party went into opposition after early elections in September 1992. Banharn took over the leadership of the Thai Nation Party from Pramarn Adireksarn in 1994 and also became official leader of the opposition.

== Premiership (1995–1996) ==
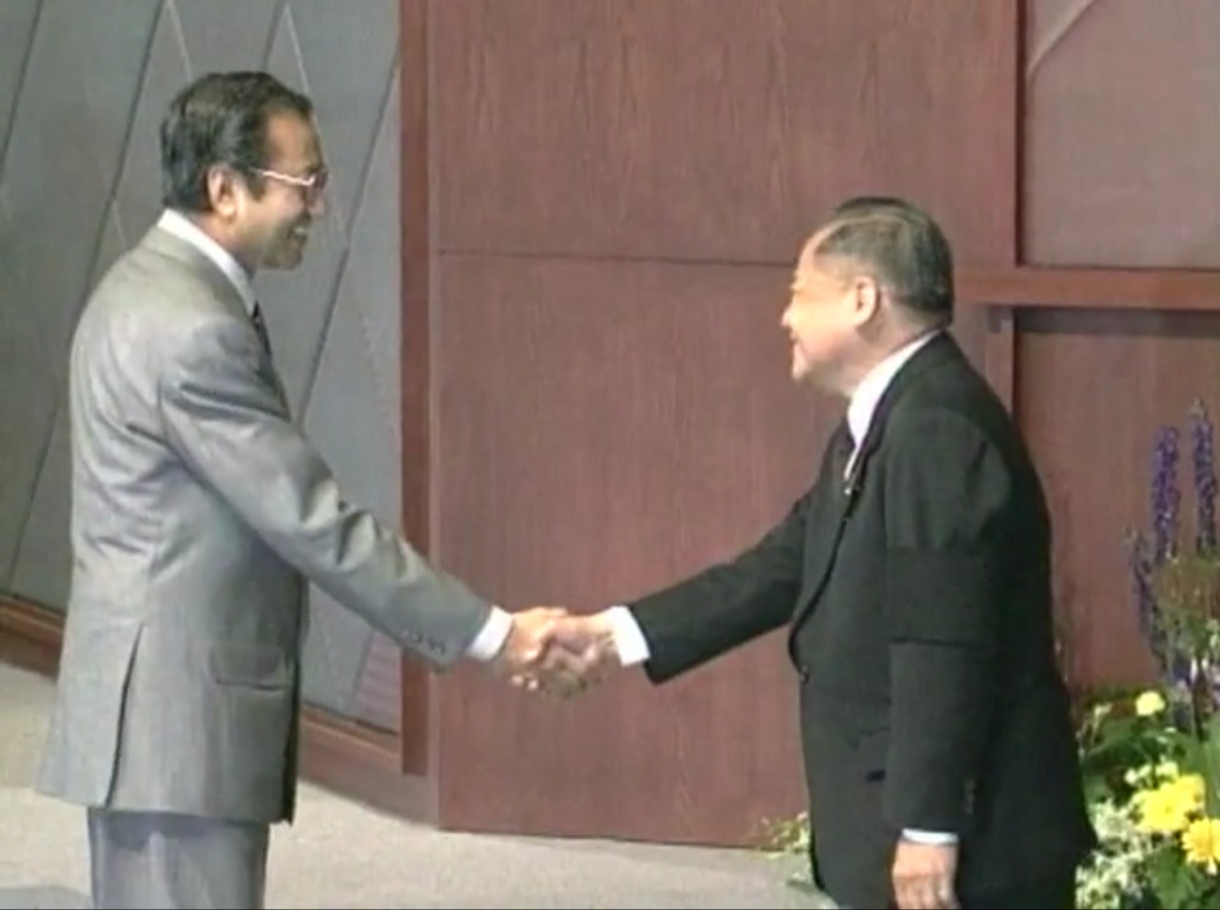
On 1 March 1996, Banharn met with Malaysian Prime Minister Mahathir Mohamad during the inaugural Asia-Europe Meeting (ASEM) in Bangkok

Under the leadership of Banharn, the Thai Nation Party won the parliamentary election in 1995, and he became the 21st Prime Minister of Thailand, leading a seven-party coalition. Banharn was involved in numerous corruption scandals, one of which diminished confidence in his administration and caused him to resign. His short-lived yet inept administration is believed to have paved the way for the economic crisis of 1997.

== Later life and death ==
On 21 January 2008, Banharn announced that his Thai Nation Party would join a coalition with the People's Power Party, successor to the Thai Rak Thai Party of former Prime Minister Thaksin Shinawatra. Due to his earlier vow before the Emerald Buddha never to rejoin Thaksin because of the corruption scandals, this move reinforced Banharn's image as a "slippery eel".

Upon the dissolution of his Thai Nation Party by the Constitutional Court on 2 December 2008, Banharn Silpa-archa was banned from politics for five years. Non-executive members of the Thai Nation Party immediately founded the Chartthaipattana Party (Thai National Development), chaired by Banharn's younger brother, Chumpol Silpa-archa. Chumphol was Minister of Tourism and Sports in the cabinet of Abhisit Vejjajiva. His son Varawut was deputy transport minister, and his daughter Kanchana was deputy education minister.

Banharn died of asthma on the morning of 23 April 2016 at Siriraj Piyamaharajkarun Hospital at the age of 83.

On 23 April 2019, a bronze statue of Banharn Silpa-archa was opening in the vicinity of the province's city shrine by the donations of Suphanburi people and the Silpa-archa family contributed to the remaining part to commemorate the things that Banharn has done for Suphanburi Province for over 40 years.

== Royal decorations ==
Banharn has received the following royal decorations in the Honours System of Thailand:

- Knight Commander (Second Class, lower grade) of The Most Illustrious Order of Chula Chom Klao
- Knight Grand Cross (First Class) of the Most Admirable Order of the Direkgunabhorn
- Knight Grand Cordon (Special Class) of the Most Exalted Order of the White Elephant
- Knight Grand Cordon (Special Class) of The Most Noble Order of the Crown of Thailand
- Red Cross Medal of Appreciation (First Class)
- Border Service Medal

=== Foreign Honours ===
- Japan: Grand Cordon of the Order of the Rising Sun
- United Kingdom: Honorary Knight Grand Cross of the Most Distinguished Order of St Michael and St George (GCMG)

Political offices
Preceded by Chuan Leekpai	Prime Minister of Thailand; 1995–1996	Succeeded by Chavalit Yongchaiyudh
Diplomatic posts
Preceded by Goh Chok Tong	Chairperson of ASEAN; 1995	Succeeded by Trần Đức Lương
