= Chart Thai Pattana Party =

Chart Thai Pattana Party พรรคชาติไทยพัฒนา
- Abbreviation: CTPP
- Leader: Kanchana Silpa-archa
- Founded: 18 April 2008
- Preceded by: Thai Nation Party
- Merged into: Bhumjaithai Party (de facto)
- Headquarters: 1 Pichai Rd., Dusit, Bangkok
- Membership (2021): 12,183
- Ideology: Moderate conservatism Agrarianism; Regional development
- Political position: Centre to centre-right
- Colors: Pink

Website
- chartthaipattana.or.th

The Chartthaipattana Party commonly known as the Chart Thai Pattana Party (CTPP; Thai: พรรคชาติไทยพัฒนา, lit. 'Thai Nation Development Party') is a moderate conservative Thai political party. It was founded on 18 April 2008 in anticipation of the 2 December 2008 Constitutional Court ruling which dissolved the Thai Nation Party and banned its executive members from participating in politics for five years beginning on that date. Numerous former members of the Thai Nation Party joined the Chartthaipattana Party, therefore, the party is considered its de facto successor.

The party has a strong base in Suphan Buri Province. The first party's leader was Chumpol Silpa-archa, the younger brother of former Prime Minister Banharn Silpa-archa, who has been banned from politics by the Constitutional Court. On 15 December 2008, the party joined the Democrat Party, forming a six-party coalition government under Abhisit Vejjajiva. In Abhisit's cabinet, the CP supplied the Deputy Prime Minister (Sanan Kachornprasart), the ministers of Tourism and Sports (Chumpol Silpa-archa), and Agriculture, and the deputy minister of transport.

For the general election on 3 July 2011, Chartthaipattana forged an alliance with coalition partner Bhumjaithai Party. The party's target was to win at least 30–35 seats and it was even hopeful that it could, as the third party, propose a "reconciliation prime minister". Eventually, the CP won 19 of the 500 seats in the house of representatives.

The party joined the Pheu Thai Party-led coalition government under Prime Minister Yingluck Shinawatra in 2011.

The party elected Kanchana Silpa-archa, daughter of former prime minister Banharn Silpa-archa, to lead them in the 2019 election. On 10 October 2022, the younger son of Banharn Silpa-archa, Varawut Silpa-archa, became the Leader of the Party following the resignation of his sister. Varawut Silpa-archa had been speculated to become the Leader back in 2018.

== Election results ==
=== General elections ===
Election	Total seats won	Total votes	Share of votes	Outcome of election	Election leader
2011	19 / 500	907,106	2.71%	▼18 seats; Coalition party	Chumpol Silpa-archa
2014	Invalidated	Invalidated	Invalidated	Unconstitutional - nullified	Banharn Silpa-archa
2019	10 / 500	782,031	2.16%	▼9 seats; Coalition party	Kanchana Silpa-archa
2023	10 / 500	584,802	1.49%	0 seats; Coalition party (until 2025); Opposition (since 2025)	Varawut Silpa-archa
2026	Didn’t Participate				

== See also ==
- Thai Nation Party
