= Ministry of Education (Thailand) =

Government ministry of Thailand

- กระทรวงศึกษาธิการ
- "The Seal of the Wheel of Law on the Boundary Stone" by Prince Narisara Nuvadtivongs

- "The Flag of the Wheel of Law on the Boundary Stone" by Prince Narisara Nuvadtivongs

Ministry overview
- Formed: 1 April 1892; 134 years ago
- Jurisdiction: Government of Thailand
- Headquarters: Dusit, Bangkok
- Annual budget: 536,697 million baht (FY2017)
- Minister responsible: Prasert Jantararuangtong, Minister
- Deputy Minister responsible: Akkharanan Kannakittinan, Deputy Minister
- Ministry executive: Suthep Kaengsantia, Permanent Secretary
- Website: www.moe.go.th

The Ministry of Education (Abrv: MOE; Thai: กระทรวงศึกษาธิการ, RTGS: Krasuang Sueksathikan) is a Thai governmental body responsible for the oversight of education in Thailand. It was established by King Rama V (Chulalongkorn) in 1892 as the Ministry of Public Instruction (Thai: กระทรวงธรรมการ, RTGS: Krasuang Thammakan; literally "Ministry of Religious Affairs") which controlled religion, education, healthcare, and museums. In 1941, the ministry changed its Thai name to the present one.

Its headquarters have been in the Chan Kasem Palace since 1937.

== Vision ==
"ภายในปี 2570 ผู้เรียนทุกช่วงวัยได้รับการพัฒนาเต็มตามศักยภาพ สอดคล้องกับความถนัดและความสนใจ มีความสุขในการเรียนรู้และพัฒนาตนเองอย่างต่อเนื่องตลอดชีวิต มีคุณธรรมจริยธรรม ภาคภูมิใจในความเป็นไทย มีทักษะที่จำเป็น และปรับตัวสอดคล้องกับวิถีชีวิตโลกยุคใหม่"

== Departments ==
=== Administration ===
- Office of the Minister: Thailand has had 21 education ministers in the past 18 years (2000–2018). Each lasts an average of nine months. As of 2018, the Minister of Education is Teerakiat Jareonsettasin, appointed in 2016.
- Office of the Permanent Secretary

=== Functional departments ===
- Office of the Education Council
- Office of the Basic Education Commission
- Office of the Vocational Education Commission
- Office of the Private Education Commission

=== Public organizations ===
Public Organization in Public Organization Act. B.E. 2542

- Mahidol Wittayanusorn School
- International Institute for Trade and Development
- National Institute Educational Testing Service

Public Organization in Specifically Act.

- Institute for the Promotion of Teaching Science and Technology
- The Teachers' Council
- Office of the Welfare Promotion Commission for Teachers and Education Personnel (Suksapan Store)
