= Kosovo–Thailand relations =

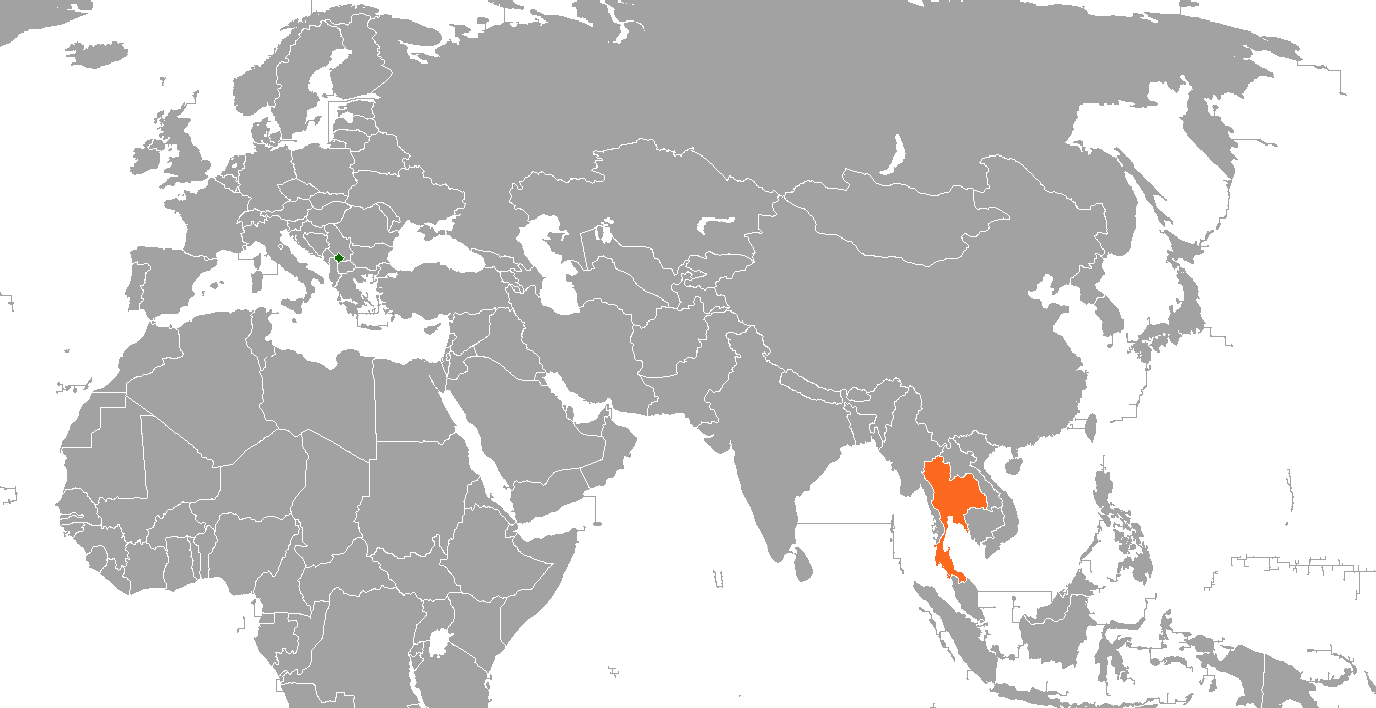
- Kosovo: Thailand

Diplomatic mission
- Embassy of Kosovo, Bangkok: Embassy of Thailand, Budapest

Envoy
- Ambassador Muhamet Brajshori: Ambassador Bhakavat Tanskul

Kosovo–Thailand relations are foreign relations between the Republic of Kosovo and the Kingdom of Thailand. Thailand recognised the Republic of Kosovo as independent state on 24 September 2013.

== Thailand's reaction to the 2008 Kosovo declaration of independence ==
In February 2008, Thailand was awaiting the decision of the UNSC.
In March 2012, Thai deputy prime minister, Yuthasak Sasiprapha, said that he was following the developments in the Balkans and Kosovo and that steps will be taken to facilitate travel by Kosovo's citizens in Thailand. In a 12 March 2012 interview after his visit to Bangkok, Albanian deputy prime minister and Foreign Minister, Edmond Haxhinasto, said that Thai authorities have made the first steps toward the recognition of Kosovo. In a 5 May 2012 meeting between the Foreign Ministers of Thailand and Kosovo, Surapong Tovichakchaikul and Enver Hoxhaj, Mr. Surapong said that recognition of Kosovo would be seriously considered by his country, and that there would soon be positive news for Kosovo. He added that Kosovo's independence has contributed to peace and security in the region and Europe. On 6 May 2012, Thai Deputy Foreign Minister, Jullapong Nonsrichai told Hoxhaj that very soon the two countries would enter into diplomatic relations. In a November 2012 meeting with Hoxhaj, Mr. Jullapong said that his government has a positive position on the recognition of Kosovo and that he personally has knowledge that the recognition is on its way and is interested in collaboration between the two countries.

== Recognition ==
Thailand recognised the Republic of Kosovo as independent state on 24 September 2013.

== Diplomatic relations ==
On 22 November 2013, Yingluck Shinawatra, Thai Prime Minister, signed the announcement on the establishment of diplomatic relations between the Kingdom of Thailand and the Republic of Kosovo. Both countries agreed to establish diplomatic relations as of 22 November 2013. In February 2019, Muhamet Brajshori became the first resident Ambassador of the Republic of Kosovo to the Kingdom of Thailand, with concurrent accreditation to Malaysia, Singapore, Brunei Darussalam, and the Maldives.

On 23 June 2022, Kosovo President Vjosa Osmani visited Thailand to attend the 2022 Global Summit of Women (GSW), as well as to promote and strengthen the relations and cooperation between the two countries.

== Kosovo Embassy ==
Kosovan Minister of Foreign Affairs, Enver Hoxhaj, has opened an embassy in Bangkok.
