= Suchart Thada-Thamrongvech =

Thai politician and professor

- สุชาติ ธาดาธำรงเวช
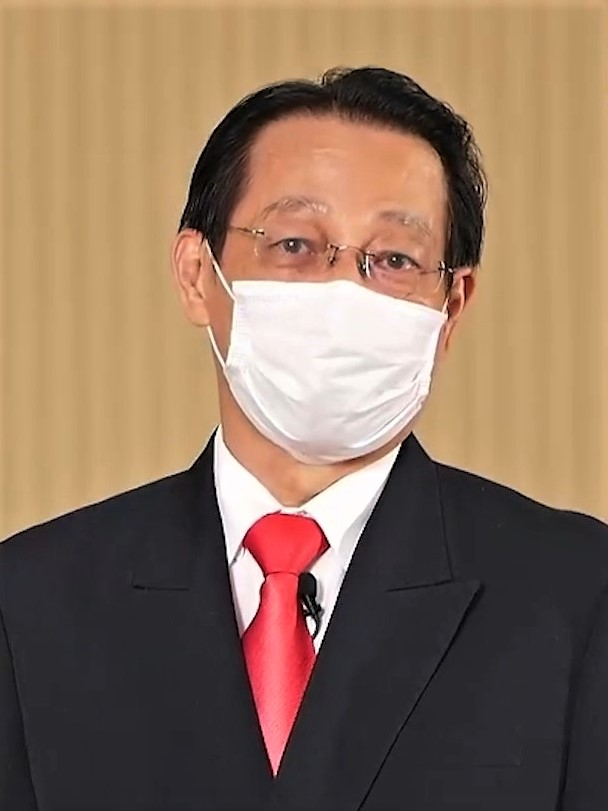

Minister of Education
- In office 18 January 2012 – 28 October 2012
- Prime Minister: Yingluck Shinawatra
- Preceded by: Worrawat Eua-apinyakul
- Succeeded by: Pongthep Thepkanjana

Minister of Finance
- In office 24 September 2008 – 19 December 2008
- Prime Minister: Somchai Wongsawat
- Preceded by: Surapong Suebwonglee
- Succeeded by: Korn Chatikavanij

Leader of Pheu Thai Party
- In office 21 September 2008 – 19 November 2008
- Preceded by: Banjongsak Wongratanawan
- Succeeded by: Yongyuth Wichaidit

Personal details
- Born: 8 August 1952 (age 74) Bangkok, Thailand
- Party: Pheu Thai Party
- Education: Thammasat University; London School of Economics; University of East Anglia; McMaster University (Ph.D.)
- Profession: Economist; university lecturer; politician

Suchart Thada-Thamrongvech (Thai: สุชาติ ธาดาธำรงเวช; RTGS: Suchat Thadathamrongwet; born 8 August 1952) is a Thai politician and professor. He served as Minister of Finance under Samak Sundaravej and Somchai Wongsawat from August to December 2008 and as Minister of Education in the Cabinet of Yingluck Shinawatra from January to October 2012. From September to November 2008, he was the chairman of the Pheu Thai Party.

== Education ==
He was educated at Thammasat University (BA, Economics), the London School of Economics (MSc, Economics), the University of East Anglia (Graduate Diploma in Economics), and McMaster University (PhD, Economics).

== Academic rank ==
- 2009 Professor of Faculty of Economics in Ramkhamhaeng University

Political offices
Preceded by Surapong Suebwonglee	Minister of Finance; 2008–2008	Succeeded by Korn Chatikavanij
Preceded by Worrawat Eua-apinyakul	Minister of Education; 2012–2012	Succeeded by Pongthep Thepkanjana
