= Samai Charoenchang =

Thai politician (1955–2026)

- สมัย เจริญช่าง
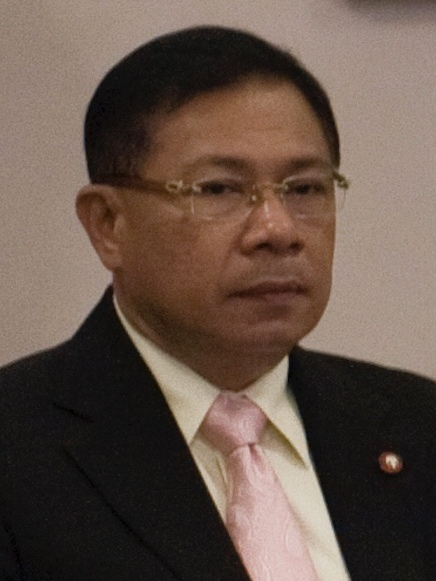
- Charoenchang in 2010

Member of the House of Representatives of Thailand
- In office 23 December 2007 – 10 July 2011
- In office 2 July 1995 – 9 November 2000

Member of the Senate of Thailand
- In office 14 April 2006 – 19 September 2006

Personal details
- Born: 18 January 1955 Nong Chok district, Thailand
- Died: 14 August 2026 (aged 71) Nong Chok district, Thailand
- Party: Democrat (1985–2019, 2025–2026); Kla (2020–2022); Sang Anakhot Thai (2022–2023); United Thai Nation (2023–2025)
- Education: Rajabhat Rajanagarindra University (BA); National Institute of Development Administration (MPA)

Samai Charoenchang (Thai: สมัย เจริญช่าง; 18 January 1955 – 14 August 2026) was a Thai politician. A member of the Democrat Party, he served in the House of Representatives from 1995 to 2000 and again from 2007 to 2011. He was also a Senator from April to September 2006.

Charoenchang died in Nong Chok district on 14 August 2026, at the age of 71.
