= Thirachai Phuvanatnaranubala =

Thai economist and politician

- ธีระชัย ภูวนาถนรานุบาล
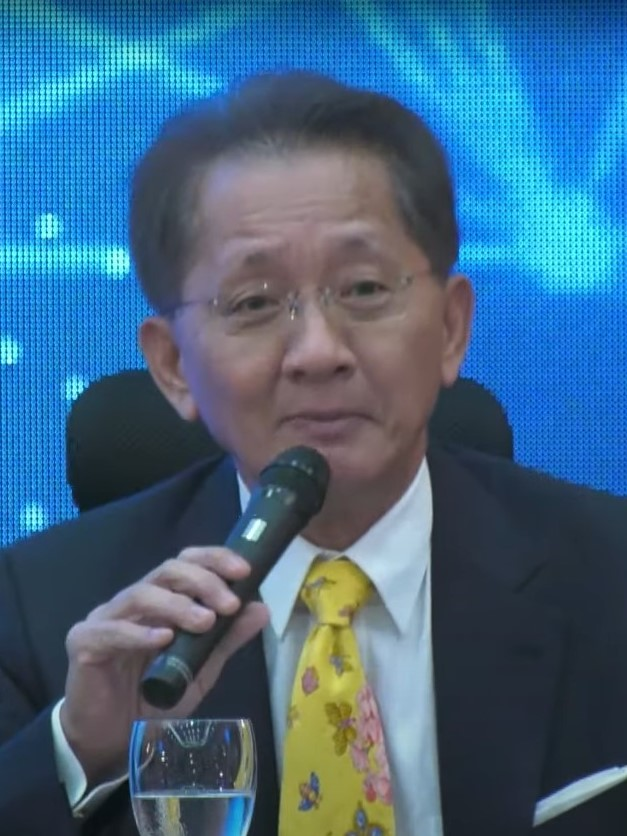
- Mr. Thirachai Phuvanatnaranubala, former Minister of Finance, discussed the issue of 5G not reaching its dreams.

Minister of Finance
- In office 9 August 2011 – 18 January 2012
- Prime Minister: Yingluck Shinawatra
- Preceded by: Korn Chatikavanij
- Succeeded by: Kittiratt Na-Ranong

Personal details
- Born: 21 December 1951 (age 74) Bangkok, Thailand
- Party: Pheu Thai Party (2010–2023); Palang Pracharath Party (since 2023)
- Education: London School of Economics
- Profession: Politician

Thirachai Phuvanatnaranubala (Thai: ธีระชัย ภูวนาถนรานุบาล, RTGS: Thirachai Phuwanatnaranuban; born December 21, 1951) is a Thai economist and politician. From 2003 to 2011 he was the Secretary-General of the Securities and Exchange Commission of Thailand and Chairman of the ASEAN Capital Markets Forum (ACMF). From 2011 to 2012 he was the Finance Minister of Thailand.

== Education ==
Thirachai Phuvanatnaranubala studied at Saint Gabriel's College and then studied economics at the London School of Economics (LSE), graduating with a bachelor's degree in 1974. After that he joined the London office of Price Waterhouse. He qualified as a fellow of the Institute of Chartered Accountants in England and Wales.

== Career ==
Thirachai returned to Thailand to work at the Bank of Thailand in 1977. During his 26 years career at the central bank, he has covered financial institution supervision, monetary policy and financial markets. Moreover, he occupied himself with the enactment of several laws related to financial services. In 2003, Thirachai was Deputy Governor of the Bank of Thailand. Other positions held by Thirachai Phuvanatnaranubala included member of the board of Experts for Interpretation of Tax Code, the Thai Institute of Directors, the Financial Institution Policy Board at the Bank of Thailand, the National Credit Bureau Co., Ltd. and the Insurance Commission. Additionally, he served on various government agencies' committees to study and recommend on policy issues.

In December 2003, Thirachai was appointed Secretary-General of the Securities and Exchange Commission (SEC) of Thailand.

== Political career ==
After her success in the 2011 general election, Pheu Thai Party leader Yingluck Shinawatra chose him for Finance Minister after Siam Commercial Bank Pcl Chairman Vichit Suraphongchai declined to accept the position. He was appointed on August 9, 2011 and was later succeeded by Korn Chatikavanij.

After taking office, Mr Thirachai ruled out any near-term move to a balanced budget; the Finance Ministry had previously set a target to balance the budget by 2015. In a cabinet reshuffle on 18 January 2012, Thirachai was sacked from his position and was replaced by Deputy Prime Minister Kittiratt Na-Ranong, formerly Minister of Commerce.

Thirachai is married and has three children.

Political offices
Preceded by Korn Chatikavanij	Minister of Finance; 2011–2012	Succeeded by Kittiratt Na-Ranong
