= Khaw Soo Cheang =

Chinese-born provincial governor of Thailand

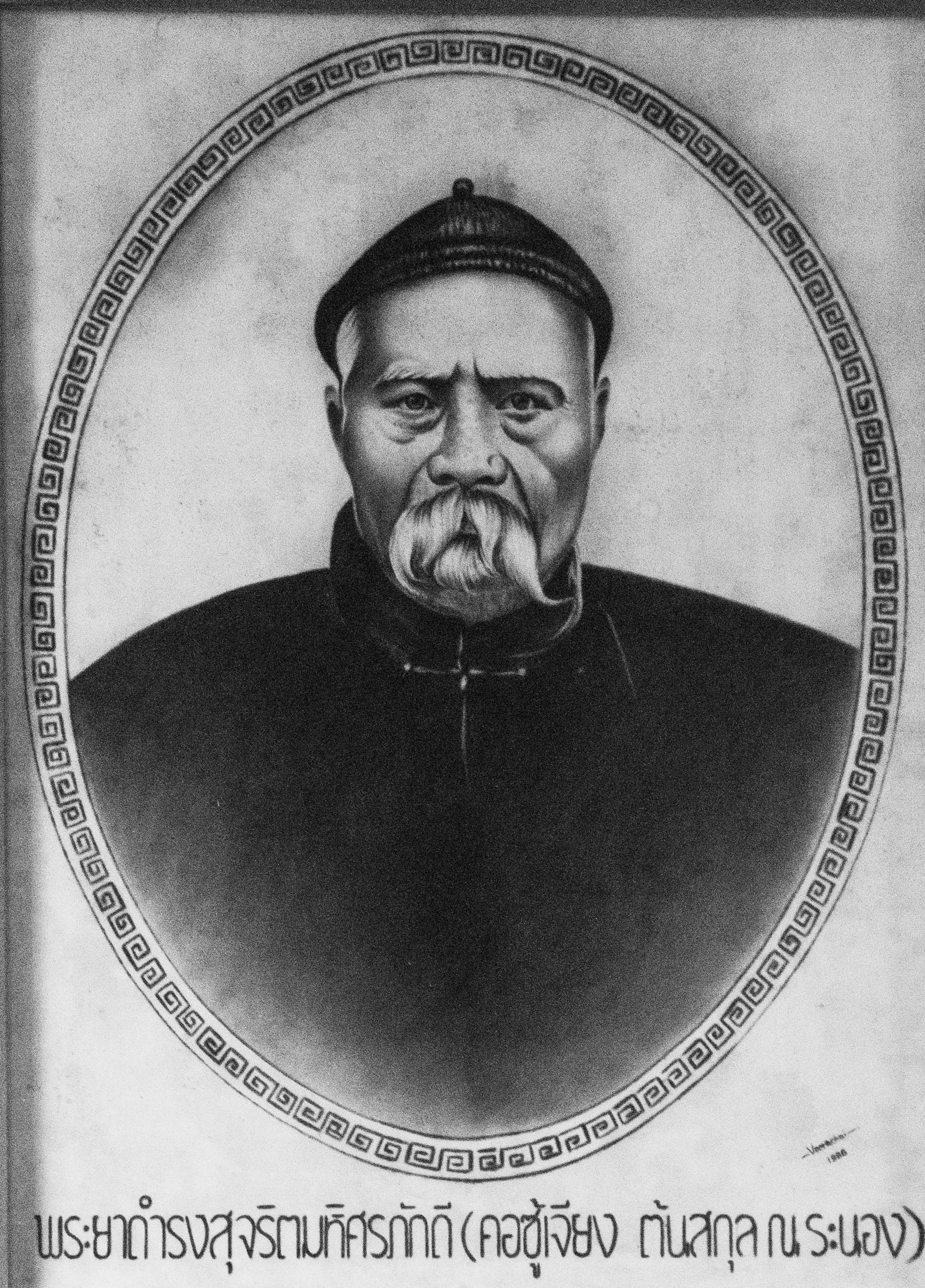
Khaw Soo Cheang

Khaw Soo Cheang (1797–1882, Chinese: 許泗漳, POJ: Khó͘ Sù Chiang, other names Khaw Teng Hai and Kor Su Jiang) was born in Xiayu Township, Longxi County of Zhangzhou, China (present-day Longhai City). At the age of 25, he left China to Nanyang in search of a better life. He arrived in Penang, then later migrated to Thailand in 1822. Khaw established a tin mining and shipping empire. He was appointed governor of Ranong Province in 1854 and given the princely title of Phraya Na Ranong by the royal family. The role of governor included collecting taxes on behalf of the state. Khaw became primogenitor of the Khaw na Ranong family, one of the most prominent Thai Chinese families in Thailand, which grew so politically and economically powerful as to challenge British colonial interests in Southeast Asia.

== Descendants ==
- Khaw Sim Kong (1840–1912), Governor of Ranong
- Khaw Sim Bee (1857–1913), Governor of Trang
- Khaw Joo Ghee (d. 1932), Governor of Ranong
- Wichit na Ranong, known to many as the Father of Phuket Tourism
- Kittiratt Na-Ranong (born 1958), Thai Finance Minister
