= Korn Chatikavanij =

Thai politician (born 1964)

- กรณ์ จาติกวณิช
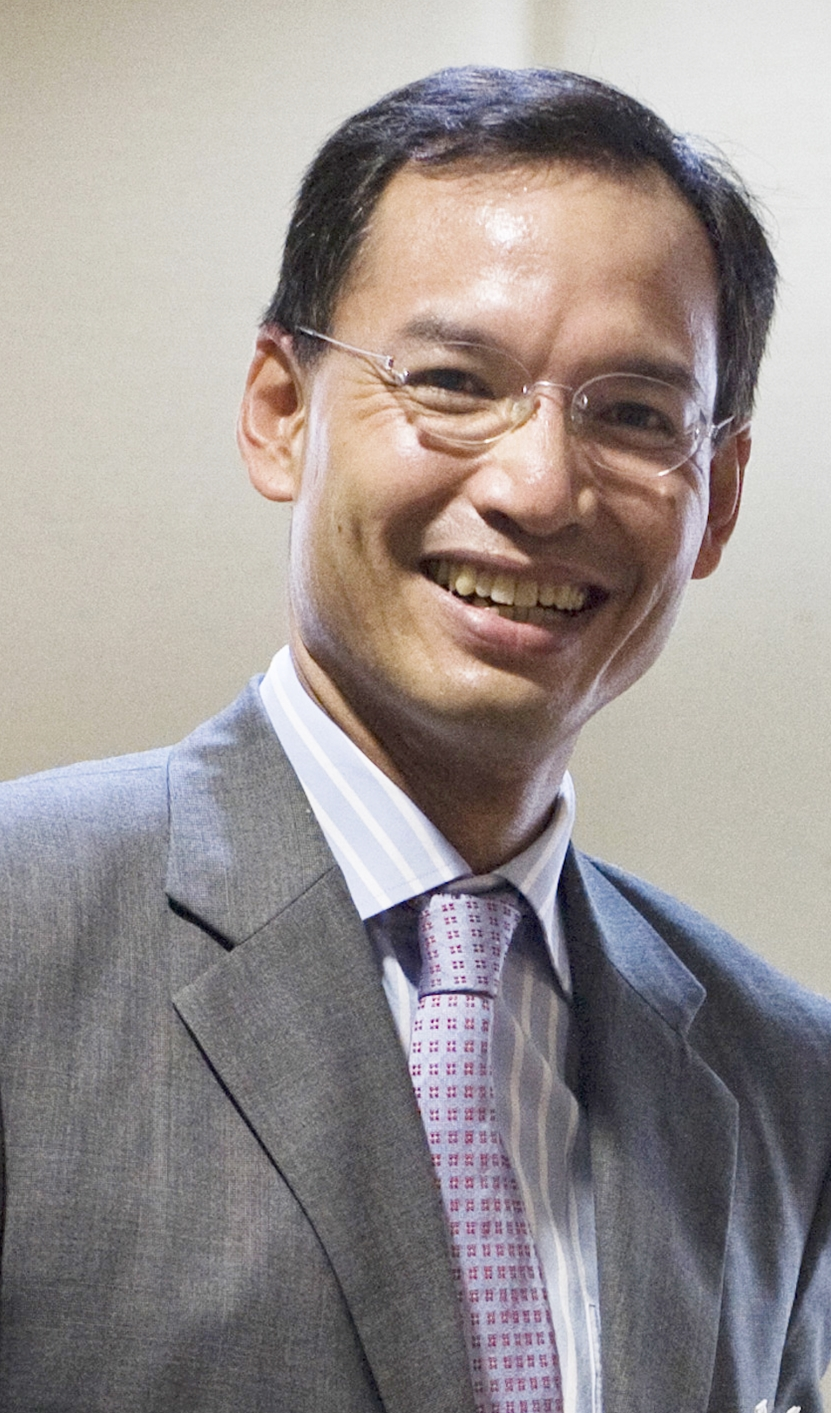
- Korn Chatikavanij in 2010

Minister of Finance
- In office 20 December 2008 – 9 August 2011
- Prime Minister: Abhisit Vejjajiva
- Preceded by: Suchart Thada-Thamrongvech
- Succeeded by: Thirachai Phuvanatnaranubala

Leader of the Chart Pattana Kla Party
- In office 16 October 2022 – 25 June 2023
- Preceded by: Tewan Liptapallop (Chart Pattana Party)
- Succeeded by: Tewan Liptapallop

Personal details
- Born: 19 February 1964 (age 62) Chelsea, London, England
- Party: Democrat Party (2025–)
- Other political affiliations: Chart Pattana Kla Party (2022–2023): Kla Party (2020–2022); Democrat Party (2005–2020)
- Spouse: Vorakorn Chatikavanij
- Education: St John's College, Oxford
- Profession: Investment banker; politician
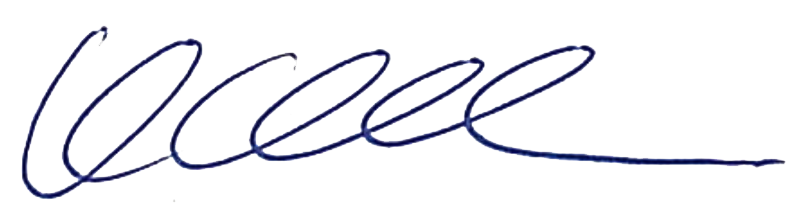
- Signature

Korn Chatikavanij (Thai: กรณ์ จาติกวณิช, RTGS: Korn Chatikawanit, born 19 February 1964) is a Thai politician. He was formerly the leader of the Chart Pattana Kla Party and the Kla Party. He was a deputy leader of the Democrat Party. A five-term MP, he served from 2008 to 2011 as finance minister under Abhisit Vejjajiva.

== Early life ==
Korn was born on 19 February 1964 in Chelsea, London, United Kingdom. He attended Somthavil School and Sathit Patumwan for primary school and Winchester College in the United Kingdom for secondary school. Korn then read philosophy, politics, and economics at St John's College, University of Oxford, where he graduated with honours. At the age of 21, Korn began his career as an investment banker in 1985, his first role being in asset management for SG Warburg. Three years later in 1988, Korn founded JF Thanakom Securities, becoming the youngest head of a Thai investment bank at the time. In 1999, Korn sold JF Thanakom to JP Morgan and became the firm's country chairman for four years.

== Early political career (2004–2008) ==
In 2004, Korn decided to resign from his post at JP Morgan to enter politics under the Democrat Party banner; he was elected as one of the Democrats' four Bangkok MPs at the 2005 general election. He represented the Yannawa district. He entered politics due to the invitation of Abhisit Vejjajiva, a friend from his time studying in the UK. Korn won with 36,010 votes and would subsequently be elected to four more terms in parliament.

In early 2006, Korn had an important role in scrutinizing the sales of the shares of Shin Corp owned by the Shinawatra and Damapong families. The Democrat Party assigned the role of head of the committee scrutinizing the Shin Corp shares sales to him, with the shares being suspected of being linked to former prime minister Thaksin Shinawatra. At the time, the Shinawatra family's sales of the Shin Corps shares were criticized for tax evasion and conflict of interest. Thaksin was eventually found guilty and some of his assets were seized.

At the 2007 general election, Korn was re-elected as a Bangkok MP for the Bangkholam, Yannawa, Khlong Toey and Wattana districts. Samak Sundaravej of the People's Power Party was able to form a coalition government after the election, making the Democrats the sole opposition party in parliament. The Democrats then formed a shadow cabinet to scrutinize the work of the executive, as is commonly found in other Westminster democracies. As the leader of the Democrat Party's economic team, Korn was appointed as shadow finance minister. In parliament, he was also appointed as the Chairman of the Finance and Financial Institutions committee in parliament.

In 2008, the Democrat Party held a general assembly to elect a new executive committee. Korn was selected as one of the party's deputy leaders, responsible for the party's work in Bangkok.

== Finance Minister of Thailand (2008–2011) ==
After the Democrats were able to form a government in 2008, Prime Minister Abhisit Vejjajiva appointed Korn as finance minister.

Korn's tenure was focused on responding to the 2008 financial crisis. As finance minister, Korn designed a stimulus package called Thai Khem Kaeng (Thai: แผนปฎิบัติการไทยเข้มแข็ง). This package was split into two parts: a 117-billion baht stimulus package initiated in January 2009 and a second stimulus package valued at over 1.4 trillion baht in 2010–2012. Most of the funds were spent improving infrastructure in Thailand, especially irrigation and transportation, public health, education, and tourism. Thailand experienced the second fastest recovery from the recession in the world, with the economy soon growing at 7.8 percent and exports growing at 28.5 percent.

Korn focused on policies that addressed social inequality and poverty. He pushed through a bill in the Thai cabinet in April 2010 on land and building tax (property tax), part of a plan to overhaul the country's tax structure as the first step to achieving a balanced budget.

Korn also helped refinance loan shark debt for over 500,000 Thais, many of whom were being charged more than 100% per annum interest on their loans.

As then Chair of the ASEAN Finance Ministers' meetings in 2009, Korn helped create the Chiang Mai Initiative Multilateralization (CMIM), a regional foreign reserve pool to remedy currency flow shortages.

In January 2010, Korn was named "Finance Minister of the Year 2010", both globally and for the Asia Pacific region by The Banker magazine of the Financial Times. The magazine complimented the Thai minister on his "financial management skills as he assumed the finance ministerial position in Thailand amid the economic stagnation". He was also given credit for his contributions to promote and enhance financial and economic cooperation in ASEAN. Korn is the only Thai to have this award globally.

== Subsequent political career in the Democrat Party (2011–2019) ==
When the Democrats were defeated in the 2011 election, Korn's term as finance minister ended and he took on the role of Shadow Deputy Prime Minister for Economic Affairs in Abhisit Vejjajiva's shadow cabinet.

After the 2014 military coup, Korn embarked on a number of projects outside of politics. They include English For All, a project to improve English education for Thai students. He also founded Refinn, a financial technology startup.

In August 2014, Korn established Kaset Khem Kaeng, a non-profit with a mission to help small farmers practice sustainable farming and receive fair compensation for their produce. The project started as a joint venture between the company and one small village in Maha Sarakham Province, one of the poorest provinces in Thailand. The company was able successfully to buy chemical-free Jasmine rice from farmers at 20,000–25,000 baht per tonne compared to the market rate of only 8,000 baht per tonne.

== New political parties (2020–2025) ==
After being elected as a Democrat Party MP in 2019, Korn resigned from parliament in 2020 and quit the Democrat Party. He then founded the Kla Party, which espoused a pragmatic ideology. Another former member of the Democrats, Atavit Suwanpakdee, became the party's secretary-general.

In September 2022, Korn announced in a press conference that he would be joining forces with Suwat Liptapallop, a former deputy prime minister and the chairman of the Chart Pattana Party. He resigned from his position in Kla and became a member of Chart Pattana's executive committee. Afterwards, on 16 October 2022, Tewan Liptapallop, then serving as Chart Pattana's leader, resigned from his position and nominated Korn to serve as his successor. Korn was thus elected as the leader of the Chart Pattana Party, which was renamed as the Chart Pattana Kla Party. Korn announced that under his leadership, Chart Pattana Kla would focus on economic policies at the next general election.

In the 2023 Thai general election, Chart Pattana Kla won two house seats. Korn announced on 25 June 2023 that he had resigned his leadership position.

== Return to the Democrat Party (2025-present) ==
In October 2025, he rejoined the Democrat Party in the lead up to the 2026 Thai general election, taking the position of deputy party leader for economic affairs.

== Family and personal life ==
Korn's family name, Chatikavanij, was bestowed by King Rama VI to Korn's paternal grandfather, Phraya Athikarnprakat (Thai: พระยาอธิกรณ์ประกาศ), who later became the Director General of Police and a member of the Privy Council for King Prajadhipok (Rama VII). Korn's father was Director General of the Customs Department, Director General of the Revenue Department, and Director of the Fiscal Policy Office. His uncle, Kasem Chatikavanij (Thai: เกษม), was the founder of the Electricity Generating Authority of Thailand (EGAT). The first ancestor of the Chatikavanijs was Siang sae Sol, a Chinese immigrant from Fujian Province who came to Siam around the 1770s. Siang's grandson, Jard Sae Sol commissioned the construction of a Chinese-styled house known as Sou Heng Tai in Talad Noi during the early-19th century.

Korn's maternal grandfather is Phraya Buretpadungkij (Thai: พระยาบุเรศผดุงกิจ), who succeeded Phraya Athikarnprakat as Director General of Police. Phraya Buretpadungkij is directly descended from Chao Anouvong, the final monarch of the Kingdom of Vientiane.

Korn is married to Vorakorn (née Sutabutr).

== Royal decorations ==
- 2011 – Knight Grand Cordon (Special Class) of The Most Exalted Order of the White Elephant
- 2010 – Knight Grand Cordon (Special Class) of The Most Noble Order of the Crown of Thailand

Political offices
Preceded by Suchart Thada-Thamrongvech	Minister of Finance; 2008–2011	Succeeded by Thirachai Phuvanatnaranubala
Assembly seats
Preceded by Charoen Khanthawong	Members of the House of Representatives for Bangkok, 7th District; 2005–2006	Vacant Title next held by Danuphon Punnakanta; Vicharn Minchainant; Natthaya Benjasiriwan
Vacant Title last held by Krisada Sajakul	Members of the House of Representatives for Bangkok, 2nd District; 2006–2011 with Somkiat Chanthawanit (2006–2010); Anucha Burapachaisri; Apirak Kosayodhin (2010–2011)	Succeeded by Onanong Kanjanachusak
Party political offices
New political party	Leader of Kla Party; 2020–2022	Succeeded by Jirayut Wirawong
Preceded by Tewan Liptapallop as Leader of Chart Pattana Party	Leader of Chart Pattana Kla Party; 2022–present	Incumbent
