= Sukampol Suwannathat =

Thai air force officer and politician

- สุกำพล สุวรรณทัต
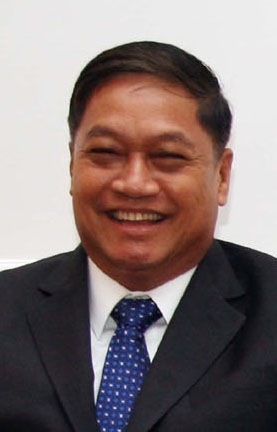
- Sukampol Suwannathat in New Delhi on 21 December 2012

Minister of Defence
- In office 18 January 2012 – 30 June 2013
- Prime Minister: Yingluck Shinawatra
- Preceded by: Yuthasak Sasiprapha
- Succeeded by: Yingluck Shinawatra

Minister of Transport
- In office 9 August 2011 – 11 January 2012
- Prime Minister: Yingluck Shinawatra
- Preceded by: Sophon Saram
- Succeeded by: Charupong Ruangsuwan

Personal details
- Born: 17 August 1951 (age 75) Bangkok, Thailand
- Party: Pheu Thai Party
- Spouse: Pilaiwan Suwannathat
- Education: Royal Thai Air Force Academy; National Defence College
- Profession: Air Force officer; politician

Military service
- Allegiance: Thailand
- Branch/service: Royal Thai Air Force
- Years of service: 1975–2011
- Rank: Air Chief Marshal

Air Chief Marshal Sukampol Suwannathat (Thai: สุกำพล สุวรรณทัต, RTGS: Sukamphon Suwannathat; born 17 August 1951) is a Thai air force officer and politician. He has served in the cabinet of Yingluck Shinawatra, as Minister of Transport from August 2011 to January 2012, and subsequently as Minister of Defence until June 2013.

== Personal life ==
Sukampol was born on 17 August 1951 as the son of Squadron Leader Suwat Suwantatat and Ratree Suwannatat.

== Education ==
Sukampol graduated from Chulalongkorn University Demonstration Secondary School (Class 4), Armed Forces Academies Preparatory School (Class 10), Royal Thai Air Force Academy (Class 17), Air Command and Staff Command (Class 29), National Defense College (Class 46).

== Air force careers ==
Sukampol is the person of Thaksin Shinawatra while serving as Prime Minister posing to be the Commander-in-Chief of the Royal Thai Air Force because of being a fellow student of the Armed Forces Academies Preparatory School together but after the coup of 19 September 2006, the command line was changed in the new line causing the military officers from class 10 fall out of position, many of whom had to retire from the post of a military commander in the area. Sukampol was changed to be a Special Air Force expert in 2007 and was changed to General Inspector in 2008.

== Political careers ==
Sukumapol Suwannatat took the position of Minister of Transport in the government of Yingluck Shinawatra since 9 August 2011 until 18 January 2012, he was appointed Minister of Defense and processed the removal of the rank of former Prime Minister Abhisit Vejjajiva when he was a teacher at Chulachomklao Royal Military Academy so he led the case to the submission of the examination to consider qualifications of Abhisit. Until June 2013, he was removed from the position of minister.

In 2016, National Legislative Assembly approved to remove Sukampol Suwannathat from his post after the National Anti-Corruption Commission found guilty of interfering with the appointment of the permanent-secretary of defense and banned from politics for 5 years.
