= Sommai Phasee =

Thai politician

- สมหมาย ภาษี
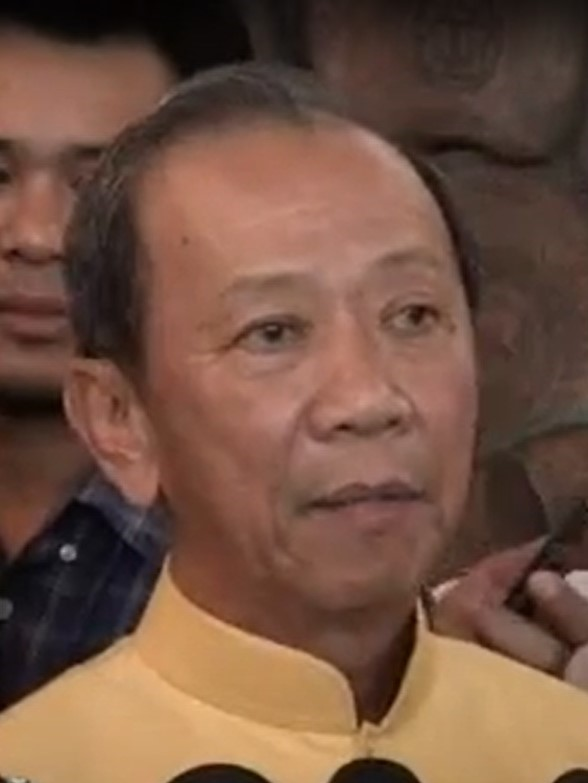
- Sommai in 2014

Minister of Finance
- In office 30 August 2014 – 19 August 2015
- Prime Minister: Prayut Chan-o-cha
- Preceded by: Kittiratt Na-Ranong
- Succeeded by: Apisak Tantivorawong

Personal details
- Born: 26 June 1944 (age 82)

Sommai Phasee (Thai: สมหมาย ภาษี, RTGS: Sommai Phasi; born 26 June 1944) is a Thai banker and financial executive. He served as Minister of Finance in the first cabinet of Prime Minister Prayut Chan-o-cha from 2014 to 2015.

Political offices
| Preceded by Kittiratt Na-Ranong | Minister of Finance; 2014–2015 | Succeeded by Apisak Tantivorawong |
