= Phraya Ratsadanupradit Mahitsaraphakdi =

Thai-Chinese provincial administrator

Phraya Ratsadanupradit Mahitsaraphakdi (Thai: พระยารัษฎานุประดิษฐ์มหิศรภักดี; 1857–1913, born Khaw Sim Bee (Thai: คอซิมบี๊; RTGS: Kho-simbi, Chinese: 許心美; Pe̍h-ōe-jī: Khó͘ Sim-bí)) was a Thai Chinese provincial administrator. He was the youngest of the six sons of Khaw Soo Cheang, a trader from Zhangzhou in China.

As a member of the Khaw family of Ranong which held the governor's post in Ranong for generations, Khaw was assigned to become governor of Trang in 1890. His most significant contribution was the introduction of the rubber tree to Thailand, which at his time was only grown in British Malaya. It has since become one of the major crops of Thailand. In addition, he also initiated the connection of Trang with Nakhon Si Thammarat and Phatthalung by road as well as the railroad connection to Nakhon Si Thammarat, one of the first railways in Thailand, kickstarting the development of Southern parts of Siam.

In 1902, he was assigned to become the commissioner of Monthon Phuket and held the post until his death in 1913.

A monument commemorating him was erected in the city of Trang. In 1992, he was also honoured as one of the five most distinguished government officials in administration.

The Khaw clan was given the noble title ‘Na Ranong’ by the King of Siam in 1913 (Rama VI).

Other notable actions:

- Advocated for a high quality hotel in Penang which led him to lease land to the Sarkies brothers to establish the Eastern & Oriental Hotel in Penang, Malaysia.
- Tin, rubber and shipping magnate - Royal Collector of tin royalties.
- In Thailand, King Rama V Chulalongkorn of Thailand named Sim Bee as Thailand's most successful provincial governor in the 1890s.
- The next king, Rama VI who went by the title of Vajiravudh also considered Sim Bee close family friend, and conferred on him Thailand's highest honour, the title Phraya Ratsadanupradit Mahisornpakdi or The Grand Cross of the Most Exalted Order of the White Elephant.

== See also ==
- Kittiratt Na-Ranong, great-grand nephew and former Deputy Prime Minister of Thailand
