= Kasem Chatikavanij =

Thai businessman (1924–2010)

Kasem Chatikavanij เกษม จาติกวณิช

Minister to the Office of the Prime Minister
- In office 24 May 1979 – 3 March 1980
- Prime Minister: Kriangsak Chamanan

Minister of Industry
- In office 11 November 1977 – 12 May 1979
- Prime Minister: Kriangsak Chamanan
- Preceded by: Perm Limpisawat
- Succeeded by: Prasit Narongdej

Personal details
- Born: 18 March 1924 Bangkok, Thailand
- Died: 17 October 2010 (aged 86) Bangkok, Thailand
- Spouse: Chatchanee Chatikavanij
- Education: Chulalongkorn University
- Profession: Engineer

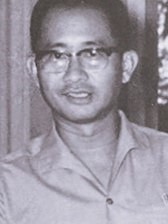
Kasem in 1965

Kasem Chatikavanij (18 March 1924 – 17 October 2010), popularly known as "Super K", was the Governor of the Electricity Generating Authority of Thailand and Chairman of Bangkok Mass Transit System PCL (BTSC), the operator of the Bangkok Skytrain. His nephew, Korn Chatikavanij, is a prominent member of the Democrat Party.

== Early life ==
Kasem studied primary school at Assumption College. While studying in secondary two his father sent to study at St Stephen's College to be a buddy with Bhichai Rattakul, former Deputy Prime Minister. Then went to study at University of Hong Kong until the Pacific War causing learning to be stopped. When the war broke out, he returned to study in engineering, electrical and mechanical fields at the Faculty of Engineering, Chulalongkorn University. Until graduating in 1947 and continuing to study for a master's degree in electrical engineering at the University of Utah.

== Careers ==
Upon graduation, he returned to government service at the factory, which was responsible for the construction of the dam. Later, the duty to build the dam Has moved up with the Royal Irrigation Department in the field of Field Marshal Plaek Phibunsongkhram, causing Kasem Jatikavanij to move to work at the Royal Irrigation Department. The first task responsible for the construction of the Yanhee Dam or Bhumibol Dam was to report to the World Bank for a loan of 65 million US dollars that is considered very high in those days and makes Kasem have the opportunity Has accumulated knowledge in project management And manage finances very much. After the Bhumibol Dam is completed Kasem also served as Deputy Governor of Yanhee Electric. Later created The North Bangkok Power Plant took place at Bang Kruai District, Nonthaburi Province. Later, when Yanhee Electric became the Electricity Generating Authority of Thailand (EGAT), Kasem became the first EGAT Governor.

In the government of Gen. Kriangsak Chamanan, Kasem was appointed as Minister of Industry and in the government of Kriangsak 2 was appointed as Minister to the Prime Minister's Office as the Prime Minister's advisor.

After resigning from EGAT, Kasem has held the position of 4 state-owned state enterprises at the same time as the Director of Thai Oil, chairman of the Board Bangchak Petroleum, Chairman of the National Fertilizer Company and chairman and Chairman of the Executive Committee Asia Trust Bank.

Mr. Kasem's contribution in the management of 4 state enterprises is the management of Thai Oil. By becoming a giant in Asia's growing oil industry and securing a large loan to expand the business, the company has earned the trust of many creditors. By the time Kasem entered the Thai Oil Administration from 1985 to 1997, Thai Oil had become a top-level oil company of Asia, until the Far Eastern Economic Review magazine named Kasem as "Energy Tzar". However, during the 1997 economic crisis in Thailand, along with the world oil price slump, Thai Oil was hit hard by exchange rate changes that doubled its foreign currency debt in Thai baht, and Kasem resigned from Thai Oil at the end of 1997.

Later in the year 1990, the name of Kasem Jatikavanij disappeared for a while. He has returned to the news again when accepted the invitation of Keeree Kanjanapas to be a chairman of the Board Bangkok Mass Transit System Public Company Limited or BTSC at the age of 67. Kasem must take responsibility for taking BTSC through various storms. Whether it is resistance from villagers in the area in the case of using the area of Silom as a parking garage That grew aggressive became a major obstacle to delay the project and having to deal with those famous people of the country that does not agree with the project at that time. Kasem, who had previously negotiated with the World Bank for a loan of US$65 million to build Bhumibol Dam in the past, could allow the World Bank to approve the loan for the BTS Skytrain Project and also joined to invest in the project by which the Thai government at that time did not contribute to guaranteeing any and all factors. The first mass transit project in Thailand can be successfully opened to the public and became part of the mass transit system Important of Bangkok to date.

== Death ==
Kasem died at 11:30 on 17 October 2010 at Ramathibodi Hospital of diabetes.
