= Yuthasak Sasiprapha =

Thai politician and retired military officer (born 1937)

General Yuthasak Sasiprapha MWM MPCh TChW
- ยุทธศักดิ์ ศศิประภา
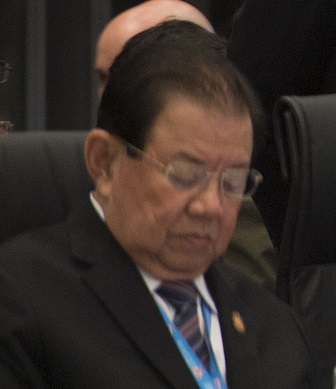

Deputy Prime Minister of Thailand
- In office 18 January 2012 – 28 October 2012
- Prime Minister: Yingluck Shinawatra

Minister of Defence
- In office 9 August 2011 – 18 January 2012
- Prime Minister: Yingluck Shinawatra
- Preceded by: Prawit Wongsuwan
- Succeeded by: Sukampol Suwannathat

President of National Olympic Committee of Thailand
- In office 2001 – 4 April 2017
- Preceded by: Chetta Thanajaro
- Succeeded by: Prawit Wongsuwan

Personal details
- Born: 8 January 1937 (age 89) Bangkok, Siam
- Party: Pheu Thai Party
- Spouse: Khunying Orapan Sasiprapha
- Education: Saint Gabriel's College; Chulachomklao Royal Military Academy
- Profession: Politician; Army Officer
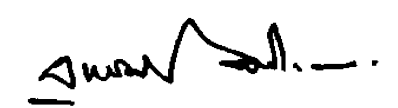
- Signature

Military service
- Branch/service: Royal Thai Army
- Years of service: 1961–1998
- Rank: General; Admiral; Air Chief Marshal

Yuthasak Sasiprapha (Thai: ยุทธศักดิ์ ศศิประภา; born 8 January 1937) is a Thai politician and retired military officer. He has been deputy defence minister in Thaksin Shinawatra's government, and president of the National Olympic Committee of Thailand. From August 2011 to January 2012, he was Minister of Defence, and since then he has served as Deputy Prime Minister in the government of Yingluck Shinawatra until 28 October 2012.

== Background ==
General Yuthasak Sasiprapha is son of Lieutenant General Att and Jumroon Sasiprapha. He is married to Khunying Orapan Sasiprapha and has 3 children. General Yuthasak studied secondary class at Saint Gabriel's College and graduated from Chulachomklao Royal Military Academy in 1961. He also studied in Army Command and Staff College Class 48 and National Defence College of Thailand Class 33.

== Career ==
General Yuthasak Sasiprapha served Royal Thai Army until earned title Major General in 1985 for Army Reserve Force Students chief of staff. In 1990 he was promoted as Lieutenant General and General in 1996, when he was director-general for Office of Policy and Planning, Ministry of Defence. He was permanent secretary of Ministry of Defence from 1 October 1996 until retired in 1998.

== Entry into politics ==
General Yuthasak entered politics by joining Thai Rak Thai Party and was elected as party list MP. In 2001, he was deputy defence minister in Thaksin Shinawatra's government. In general election 2011, he was also elected as party-list MP from Pheu Thai Party. On 9 August 2011, he was appointed Minister of Defence in the government of Yingluck Shinawatra. In a cabinet reshuffle on 18 January 2012, he lost the Defence portfolio, but was made Deputy Prime Minister, charged with overseeing security affairs.

== Royal Decorations ==
received the following royal decorations in the Honours System of Thailand :

- 1997 - Grand Companion of the Order of Chula Chom Klao
- 1989 - Knight Grand Cordon of the Order of the Crown of Thailand
- 1993 - Knight Grand Cordon of the Order of the White Elephant
- 2011 - Knight Commander of the Order of the Direkgunabhorn
- 2011 - Order of Symbolic Propitiousness Ramkeerati
- 1964 - King Rama IX Royal Cypher Medal, Fifth Class
- 1964 - Victory Medal - Korean War
- 1973 - Victory Medal - Vietnam War, With Flames
- 1997 - Freeman Safeguarding Medal, First Class
- 1967 - Border Service Medal
- 1977 - Chakra Mala Medal

=== Foreign honours ===
- South Vietnam :
  - Gallantry Cross With Bronze Star
  - Armed Forces Honor Medal, First Class
  - Staff Service Medal, First Class
  - Vietnam Campaign Medal
  - Cultural and Educational Service Medal, Second Class
  - Public Health Service Medal, Second Class
  - Social Service Medal, First Class
  - Public Works, Communication and Transportation Service Medal, Second Class
  - Labor Medal, Second Class
  - Ethnic Development Medal, First Class
  - Police Honor Medal, Second Class
  - Youth and Sports Service Medal, Second Class
- USA :
  - Army Commendation Medal

==== Unit Citation ====
- Korean Presidential Unit Citation
- Civil Actions Unit Citation

Political offices
Preceded by Prawit Wongsuwan	Minister of Defence; 2011-2012	Succeeded by Sukampol Suwannathat
