= Kla Party =

Thai political party

The Kla Party (Thai: พรรคกล้า, lit. 'Brave Party') is a political party in Thailand led by Korn Chatikavanij, a former member of the Democrat Party. In 2022, the party participated in the Bangkok metropolitan council election but failed to secure any seats, receiving 53,232 votes (2.32% of the total). On September 26, 2022, Korn Chatikavanij announced that the Kla Party had formed a political alliance with the Chart Pattana Kla Party to compete in the upcoming Thai general election in 2023. The Chart Pattana Kla Party currently has four members of parliament, while the Kla Party has none. The Chart Pattana Kla Party only received 0.70% of the votes in 2019, indicating a decline in support since 2011. Korn Chatikavanij's popularity as a prime ministerial candidate is around 2.12% in recent polls, reaching a maximum of 3.78%. The party's agenda includes the legalization of gambling to stimulate the economy in Thailand. It is possible that other parties may join the alliance, considering the reduction of party-list candidates from 150 to 100 in September 2021. If fortunate, the Kla Party may win one seat in the 2023 election. Korn Chatikavanij is expected to lead the party as a prime ministerial candidate, but typically polls around 1.5% to 2.5% in popularity surveys.
