= Yingluck Shinawatra =

Prime Minister of Thailand from 2011 to 2014

Yingluck Shinawatra MPCh MWM
- ยิ่งลักษณ์ ชินวัตร
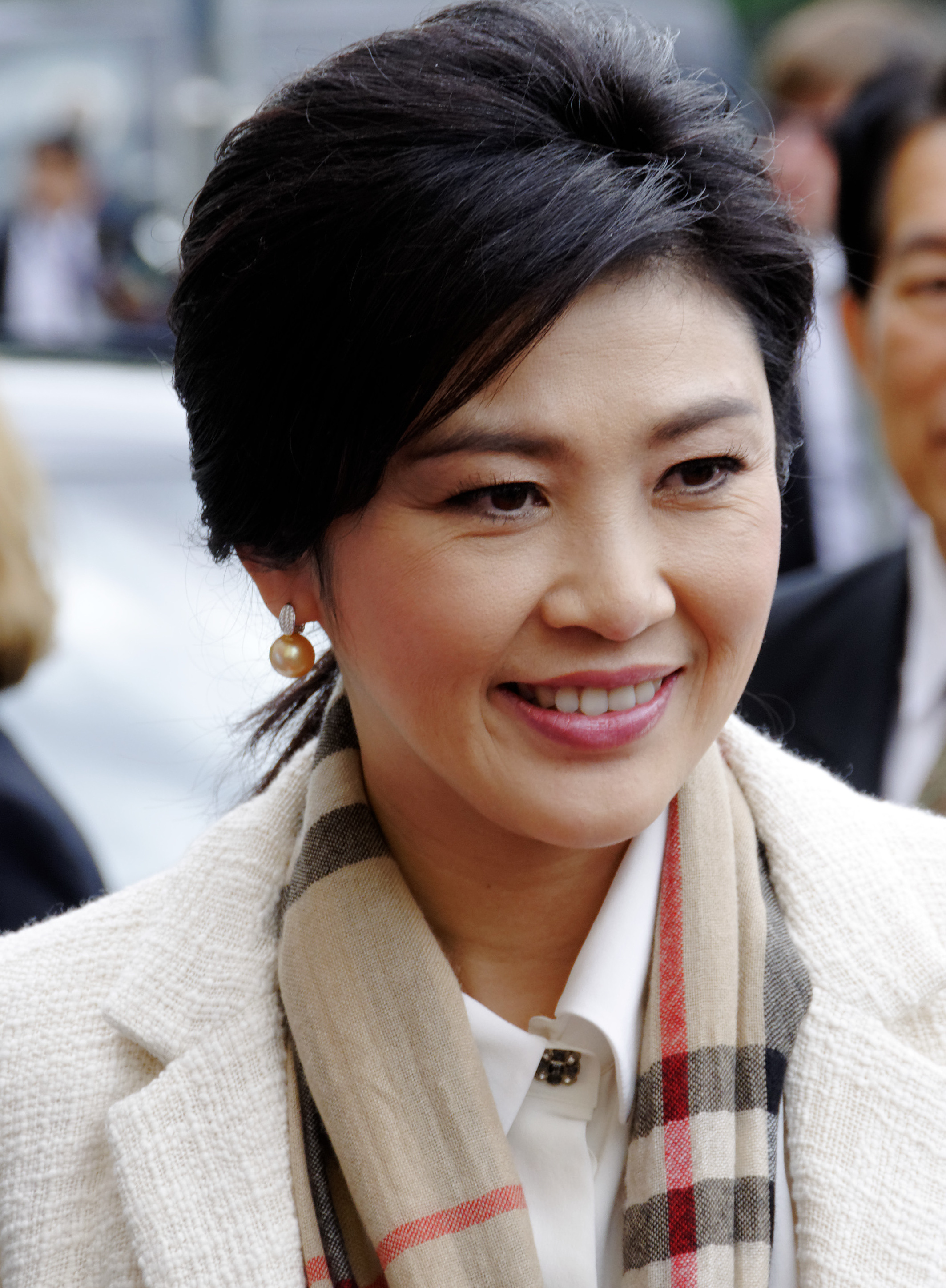
- Yingluck in 2012

28th Prime Minister of Thailand
- In office 5 August 2011 – 7 May 2014
- Monarch: Bhumibol Adulyadej
- Deputy: See list: Yongyuth Wichaidit; Surapong Tovichakchaikul; Kittiratt Na-Ranong; Chalerm Yubamrung; Kowit Wattana; Chumpol Silpa-archa; Yuthasak Sasiprapha; Plodprasop Suraswadi; Phongthep Thepkanjana; Yukol Limlaemthong; Niwatthamrong Boonsongpaisan; Pracha Phromnok
- Preceded by: Abhisit Vejjajiva
- Succeeded by: Niwatthamrong Boonsongpaisan (acting); Prayut Chan-o-cha

Minister of Defence
- In office 30 June 2013 – 7 May 2014
- Prime Minister: Herself
- Preceded by: Sukampol Suwannathat
- Succeeded by: Prawit Wongsuwon

Member of the House of Representatives
- In office 3 July 2011 – 9 December 2013
- Constituency: Party-list

Personal details
- Born: 21 June 1967 (age 59) San Kamphaeng, Chiang Mai, Thailand
- Citizenship: Thailand; Serbia
- Party: Pheu Thai (2008–present)
- Domestic partner: Anusorn Amornchat (1995–present)
- Children: 1
- Relatives: Shinawatra family
- Education: Chiang Mai University (BA); Kentucky State University (MPA)
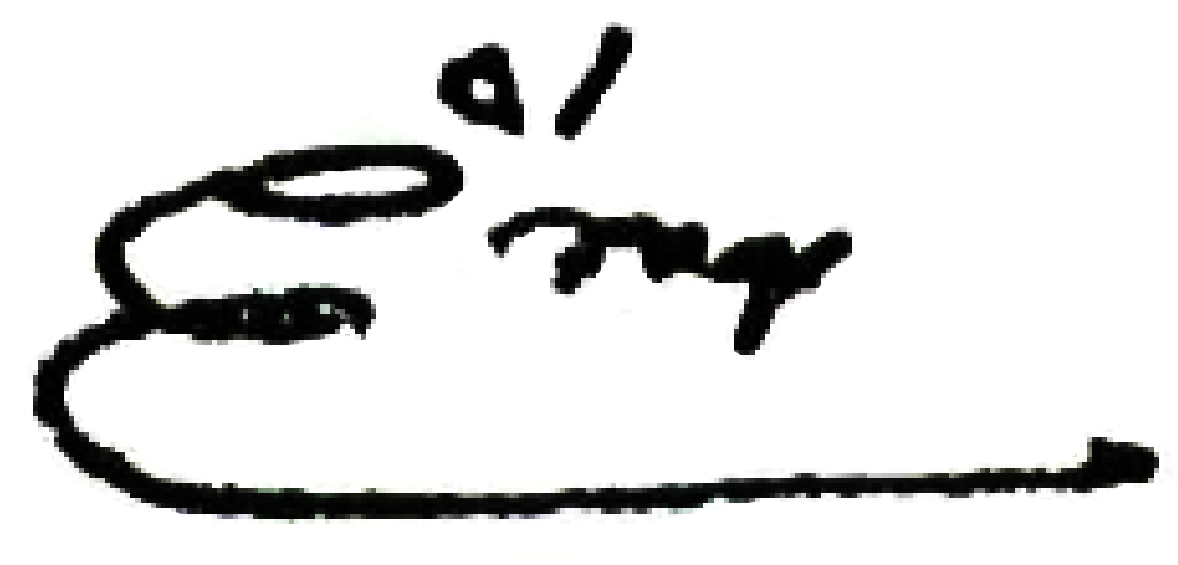
- Signature
- Nickname: Pou (ปู)

Yingluck Shinawatra (Thai: ยิ่งลักษณ์ ชินวัตร, RTGS: Yinglak Chinnawat, pronounced [jîŋ.lák tɕʰīn.nā.wát]; born 21 June 1967) is a Thai businesswoman, politician and a member of the Pheu Thai Party who was the 28th prime minister of Thailand from 2011 to 2014. Yingluck was Thailand's first female prime minister and its youngest in over 60 years since the Siamese revolution of 1932. She was removed from office on 7 May 2014 by a Constitutional Court decision.

Born in Chiang Mai Province into a wealthy family of Chinese descent, Yingluck Shinawatra earned a bachelor's degree from Chiang Mai University and a master's degree from Kentucky State University, both in public administration. She then became an executive in the businesses founded by her elder brother, Thaksin Shinawatra and later became the president of property developer SC Asset and managing director of Advanced Info Service. Thaksin served as prime minister from 2001 until 2006 when he was overthrown by a military coup. He fled abroad shortly before he was convicted in absentia of using his position to increase his own wealth. Thereafter, he lived in self-imposed exile to avoid serving his prison sentence until he returned to Thailand in August 2023.

In May 2011, the Pheu Thai Party, which maintains close ties to Thaksin, nominated Yingluck as their candidate for Prime Minister in the 2011 election. She campaigned on a platform of national reconciliation, poverty eradication, and corporate income tax reduction and won a landslide victory.

After mass protests against her government in late 2013, she asked for a dissolution of parliament on 9 December 2013, triggering a snap election, but continued to act as caretaker prime minister. On 7 May 2014, the Constitutional Court of Thailand removed Yingluck Shinawatra from the office of caretaker prime minister and defence minister following months of political crisis. The court found her guilty of charges of abuse of power over the removal of national security chief Thawil Pliensri in 2011. In the wake of the May 2014 military coup, Yingluck was arrested along with former cabinet ministers and political leaders of all parties, and held at an army camp for a few days while the coup was consolidated.

She was tried in 2016 but did not appear in court in August 2017 for the verdict. An arrest warrant was issued. She reportedly fled the country. In September 2017, she was found guilty in absentia and sentenced to five years in prison. She is rumoured to now be in London. Yingluck has become the chairwoman and legal representative of Shantou International Container Terminals Ltd since 12 December 2018, a Chinese port operator, operating in the Port of Shantou in eastern Guangdong.

== Early life and business career ==
Yingluck was born on 21 June 1967 in San Kamphaeng, Chiang Mai, Thailand. She is the youngest of nine children of Loet Shinawatra and Yindi Ramingwong. Her father was a businessman and member of parliament for Chiang Mai. Her paternal family is of Hakka Chinese origin, descending from Seng Saekhu (her great-grandfather) who immigrated from Fengshun, Guangdong, to Siam in the 1860s, becoming a tax farmer in Chiang Mai. She was given the Chinese name 丘英樂 (Teochew Khu Eng-la̍k, Hakka Hiû Yîn-lo̍k). On her maternal side, she is a descendant of the former royal family of Chiang Mai through her grandmother, Princess Chanthip na Chiangmai (great-great-granddaughter of Prince Thammalangka who ruled Chiang Mai in the early-19th century). Yingluck grew up in Chiang Mai and attended Regina Coeli College, a private girls' Catholic school, for the lower secondary level, followed by Yupparaj College, a co-educational school, at the upper secondary level. She graduated with a Bachelor of Arts degree from the Faculty of Political Science and Public Administration at Chiang Mai University in 1988 and received a Master of Public Administration degree (specialisation in Management Information Systems) from Kentucky State University in the United States in 1991.

Yingluck began her career as a sales and marketing intern in 1993 at Shinawatra Directories Co., Ltd., a telephone directory business founded by AT&T International. She later became the director of procurement and the director of operations. In 1994, she became the general manager of Rainbow Media, a subsidiary of International Broadcasting Corporation (which later became TrueVisions). She left as Deputy CEO of IBC in 2002, and became the CEO of Advanced Info Service (AIS), Thailand's largest mobile phone operator. After the sale of Shin Corporation (the parent company of AIS) to Temasek Holdings, Yingluck resigned from AIS, but remained managing director of SC Asset Co Ltd, the Shinawatra family property development company. She was investigated by Thailand's Securities and Exchange Commission regarding possible insider trading after she sold shares of her AIS stock for a profit prior to the sale of the Shin Corporation to Temasek Holdings. However, no charges were filed. Yingluck Shinawatra is also a committee member and secretary of the Thaicom Foundation.

Yingluck received 0.68 percent of Shin Corp shares out of the 46.87 percent that Thaksin Shinawatra and his then-wife held in 1999. The military junta-appointed Assets Examination Committee charged that Yingluck made up false transactions and that "there were no real payments for each Ample Rich Co., Ltd shares sold" and "the transactions were made at a cost basis of par value in order to avoid income taxes, and all the dividends paid out by Shin to those people were transferred to [her sister-in-law] Potjaman's bank accounts". However, the AEC did not pursue a case against her. Yingluck, in response, claimed that "her family has been a victim of political persecution".

== Political career ==
=== Establishment of the Pheu Thai Party ===
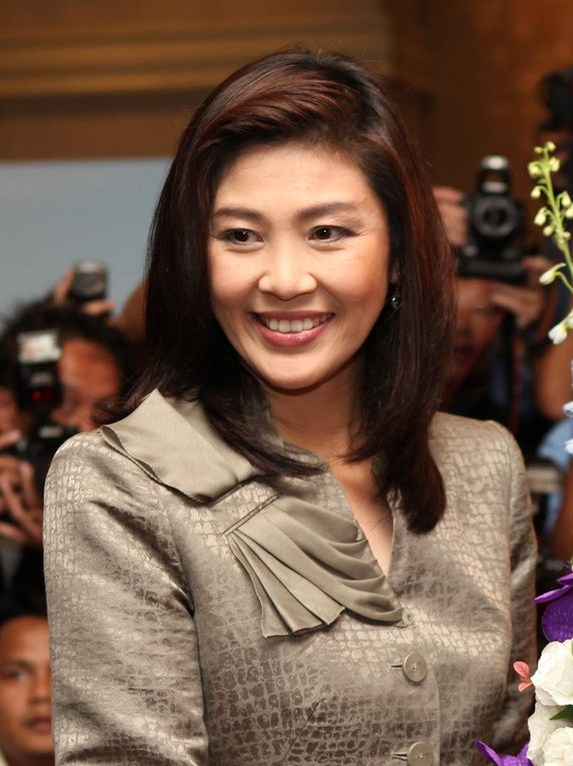
Yingluck Shinawatra at U.S. Embassy in Bangkok, July 2011

After the governing People's Power party was dissolved and its executive board was banned from political activity for five years by the Constitutional Court on 2 December 2008, the former People's Power Party MPs formed the Pheu Thai Party. Yingluck was asked to become the party's leader, but she declined, saying that she had no desire to be prime minister and wanted to concentrate on business. Yongyuth Wichaidit became the leader of the party.

US diplomatic cables leaked in 2011 revealed that during a 9 September 2009 meeting, former Deputy Prime Minister and "close Thaksin ally" Sompong Amornwiwat told Ambassador to Thailand Eric John that she did not envision a big role for Yingluck in the Pheu Thai Party, and that "Thaksin himself was not eager to raise her profile within the party, and was more focused on finding ways to keep his own hand active in politics." However, in a subsequent cable dated 25 November 2009, the ambassador noted that in a meeting with Yingluck, she spoke with confidence about the "operations, strategy and goals" of the Pheu Thai party and seemed "far more poised" than in previous meetings. The cable cited Yingluck saying that, "Someone could easily emerge relatively late in the game to take the reins of the party and serve as the next Prime Minister."

Yingluck's bank account was among 86 accounts that the Abhisit government accused of being used to finance the Red Shirt protesters during their demonstrations in 2010. Abhisit accused the Red Shirts of trying to overthrow the monarchy, something they denied. However, the government did not pursue any legal action against her. The Department for Special Investigation found that from 28 April 2009 to May 2010, 150 million baht was deposited into one of her accounts while 166 million baht was withdrawn. On 28 April 2010 alone, 144 million baht was withdrawn.

=== Pheu Thai Party leadership ===
Yongyuth had stated her intention of resigning as party leader in late 2010. Speculation about a snap election in early 2011 heightened internal debate over the party leadership. The front runners were Yingluck and Mingkwan Saengsuwan, who had led the opposition in an unsuccessful motion of no confidence against the Democrat Party-led coalition government. As late as 28 January 2011, Yingluck continued to rule out the party leadership, repeating that she wanted to focus on business. However, she was endorsed by veteran politician Chalerm Yubamrung.

On 16 May 2011, the Pheu Thai party voted to name Yingluck as their top candidate under the party-list system (and presumably be the party's nominee for Prime Minister) for parliamentary election scheduled for 3 July. However, she was not made party leader and did not join the party's executive board. The ultimate decision was made by Thaksin himself. "Some said she is my nominee. That's not true. But it can be said that Yingluck is my clone... Another important thing is that Ms Yingluck is my sister and she can make decisions for me. She can say 'yes' or 'no' on my behalf," noted Thaksin in an interview.

=== 2011 election and rise to premiership ===
==== Election campaign ====
Pheu Thai campaigned with a slogan of "Thaksin thinks, Pheu Thai acts". Yingluck's main campaign theme was reconciliation following the extended political crisis from 2008 to 2010, culminating in the military crackdown on protesters which left nearly 100 protesters dead and thousands injured. She promised to empower the Independent Truth and Reconciliation Commission of Thailand (ITRC), the panel that the Democrat-led government had set up to investigate the killings. The ITRC had complained that its work was hampered by the military and the government.

Yingluck also proposed a general amnesty for all major politically motivated incidents that had taken place since the 2006 coup, which could include the coup itself, court rulings banning Thai Rak Thai and People's Power Party leaders from seeking office, the People's Alliance for Democracy (PAD) seizures of Government House and Don Muang and Suvarnabhumi Airports, the military crackdowns of 2009 and 2010, and the conviction of Thaksin Shinawatra for abuse of power. The proposal was fiercely attacked by the government, who claimed that it would specifically give amnesty to Thaksin, and also result in the return to him of the 46 billion baht of his wealth that the government had seized as a penalty. However, Yingluck denied that the return of seized assets was a priority for the Pheu Thai party, and repeated that she had no intention of giving amnesty to any one person. Abhisit claimed outright that Yingluck was lying and that amnesty to Thaksin actually was the Pheu Thai party's policy. The government blamed Pheu Thai for the bloodshed during the military crackdown.

Yingluck described a 2020 vision for the elimination of poverty. She promised to reduce the corporate income tax from 30 per cent to 23 per cent and then 20 per cent by 2013 and to raise the minimum wage to 300 baht per day and the minimum wage for university graduates to 15,000 baht per month. Her agricultural policies included improving operating cashflow to farmers and providing loans of up to 70 per cent of expected income, based on a guaranteed rice price of 15,000 baht per tonne. She also planned to provide free public Wi-Fi and a tablet PC to every schoolchild (a Thai Rak Thai Party plan to provide one laptop per child was cancelled after the 2006 military coup).

==== Election results and the establishment of the government ====
Exit polls indicated a landslide victory, with Pheu Thai projected to win as many as 310 seats in the 500-seat parliament. However, the official result was 265 seats and 47 percent of the vote for Pheu Thai, with a 75.03 percent election turnout rate. There were 3 million invalid ballots; the large number was cited as the cause for the difference between the exit poll results and the official count. It was only the 2nd time in Thai history that a single party won more than half of the seats in parliament; the first time was in 2005 with Thaksin's own Thai Rak Thai Party.

United Nations secretary-general Ban Ki-moon welcomed the outcome of the elections and called for all parties to "respect the will of the Thai people as expressed through the democratic process." Aung San Su Kyi congratulated Yingluck, praised the election as "free and fair", and said that she expected "the ties between Myanmar and Thailand to get better."

Yingluck quickly formed a coalition with the Chartthaipattana (19 seats), Chart Pattana Puea Pandin (7 seats), and Phalang Chon (7 seats), and Mahachon (1 seat), and New Democracy (1 seat) parties, giving her a total of 300 seats. Outgoing Defense Minister General Prawit Wongsuwan said that he accepted the election results, and after having talked with military leaders, would not intervene.

== Prime Minister of Thailand (2011–2014) ==
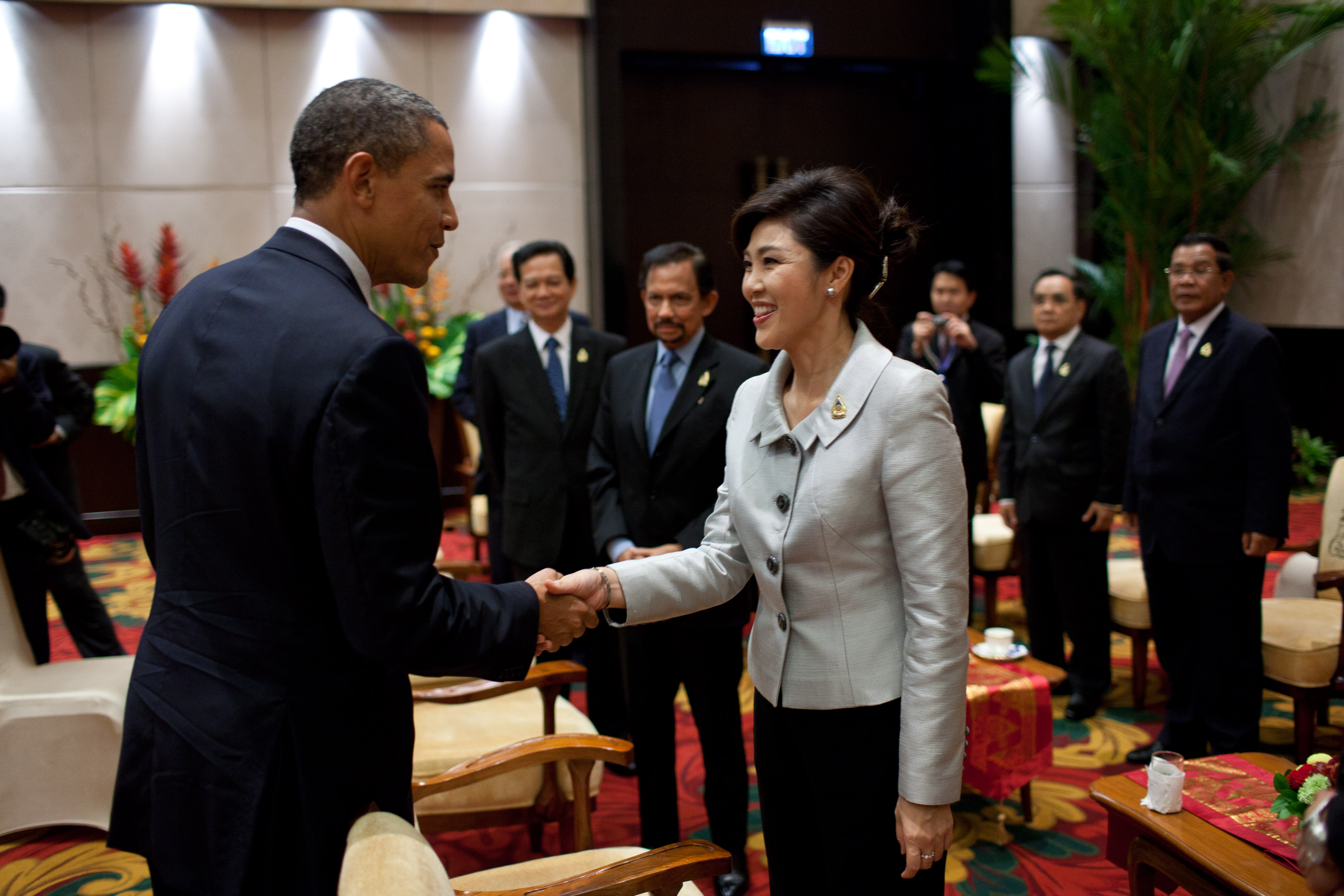
Yingluck greeting US President Barack Obama at the ASEAN Summit in Nusa Dua, Bali, Indonesia, 18 November 2011

Following the general election, the first separate session of the House of Representatives was held in the morning of 5 August to select a new Prime Minister. 296 of the 500 members of parliament voted to approve the premiership of Yingluck Shinawatra, three disapproved, and 197 abstained. Four Democrat lawmakers were absent. Somsak Kiatsuranont, President of the National Assembly, advised and consented King Bhumibol Adulyadej to appoint Yingluck Prime Minister on 8 August. The Proclamation on her appointment was made retroactive, taking effect from 5 August.

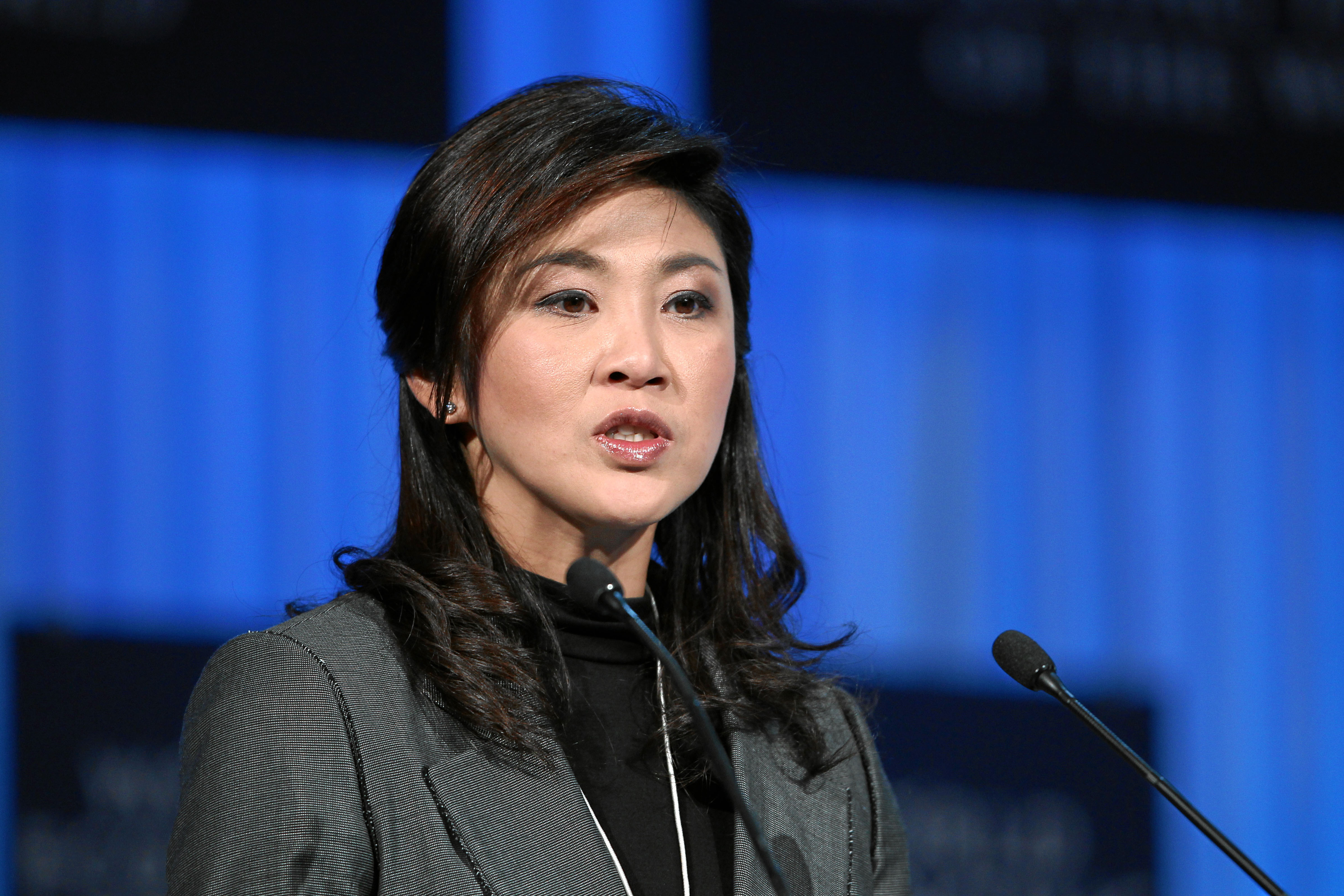
Yingluck at the World Economic Forum, January 2012

Yingluck established her cabinet on 9 August. She and her Ministers were sworn in on 10 August. They were then required to complete addressing their administrative policy to the National Assembly. According to the Constitution, the address had to be made within fifteen days from the effective date of the Proclamation on Yingluck's appointment.

Key members of Yingluck's cabinet include former Interior Permanent Secretary Yongyuth Wichaidit as Interior Minister, Securities and Exchange Commission Secretary-General Thirachai Phuvanatnaranubala as Finance Minister, and former Defense Permanent Secretary General Yuthasak Sasiprapa as Defense Minister. Absent from Yingluck's cabinet were Red Shirts who had spearheaded protests against the Democrat-led government.

On the economic front, her government introduced a minimum wage of 300 baht a day. The minimum wage reform significantly increased the average daily earnings, the number of paid days of employment, consumption expenditure per capita, and income per capita. A civil union project for homosexual couples was presented in 2013, but did not have time to be adopted due to the 2014 coup d'état.

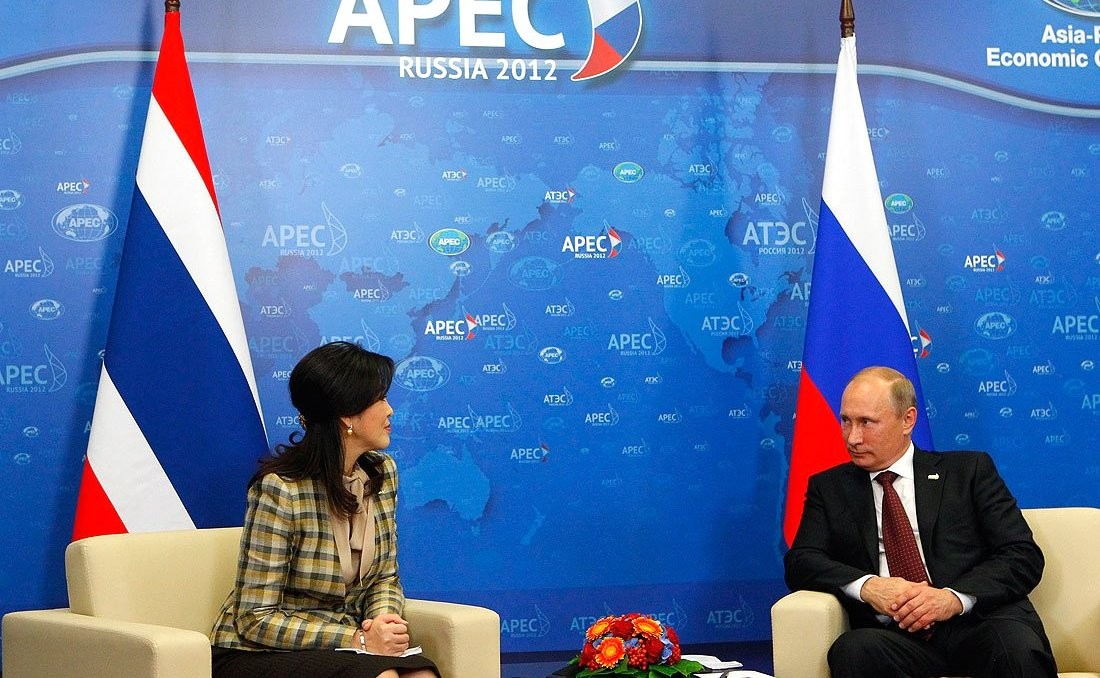
Yingluck with Russian President Vladimir Putin at the APEC summit in Vladivostok, Russia, 8 September 2012

Polls from shortly after her cabinet was announced found that the cabinet rated most highly in terms of economic competency. It also showed that Yingluck was much more popular than her exiled brother Thaksin.

=== 2011 floods ===
The 2011 rainy season saw the highest levels of rainfall in Thailand in the previous 50 years. Flooding started in northern Thailand on 31 July, a week prior to Yingluck's appointment as prime minister. Flooding quickly spread from the North to the Central Chao Phraya River Basin, and by the beginning of October, the province of Ayutthaya, north of Bangkok, was almost flooded. The floods were the worst in Thailand in over 50 years. Yingluck established centralised flood monitoring and relief operations in mid-August and made tours of flooded provinces beginning 12 August. Yingluck also pledged to invest in long-term flood prevention projects, including the construction of drainage canals. Flood reduction measures were hampered by disputes between people on the different sides of flood barriers: those on the flooded side in some instances sabotaged the barriers, sometimes resulting in armed confrontation. Opposition leader Abhisit Vejjajiva and military leaders called for Yingluck to declare a state of emergency, claiming that it would give the military greater authority to deal with embankment sabotage. A state of emergency had last been declared in 2010 during the Abhisit-government's crackdown on anti-government protesters. Yingluck refused to declare a state of emergency, saying that it would not improve flood management. Instead, she invoked the 2007 Disaster Prevention and Mitigation Act and issued a disaster warning which gave her government greater authority to manage flood control and drainage.

=== Cabinet reshuffle ===
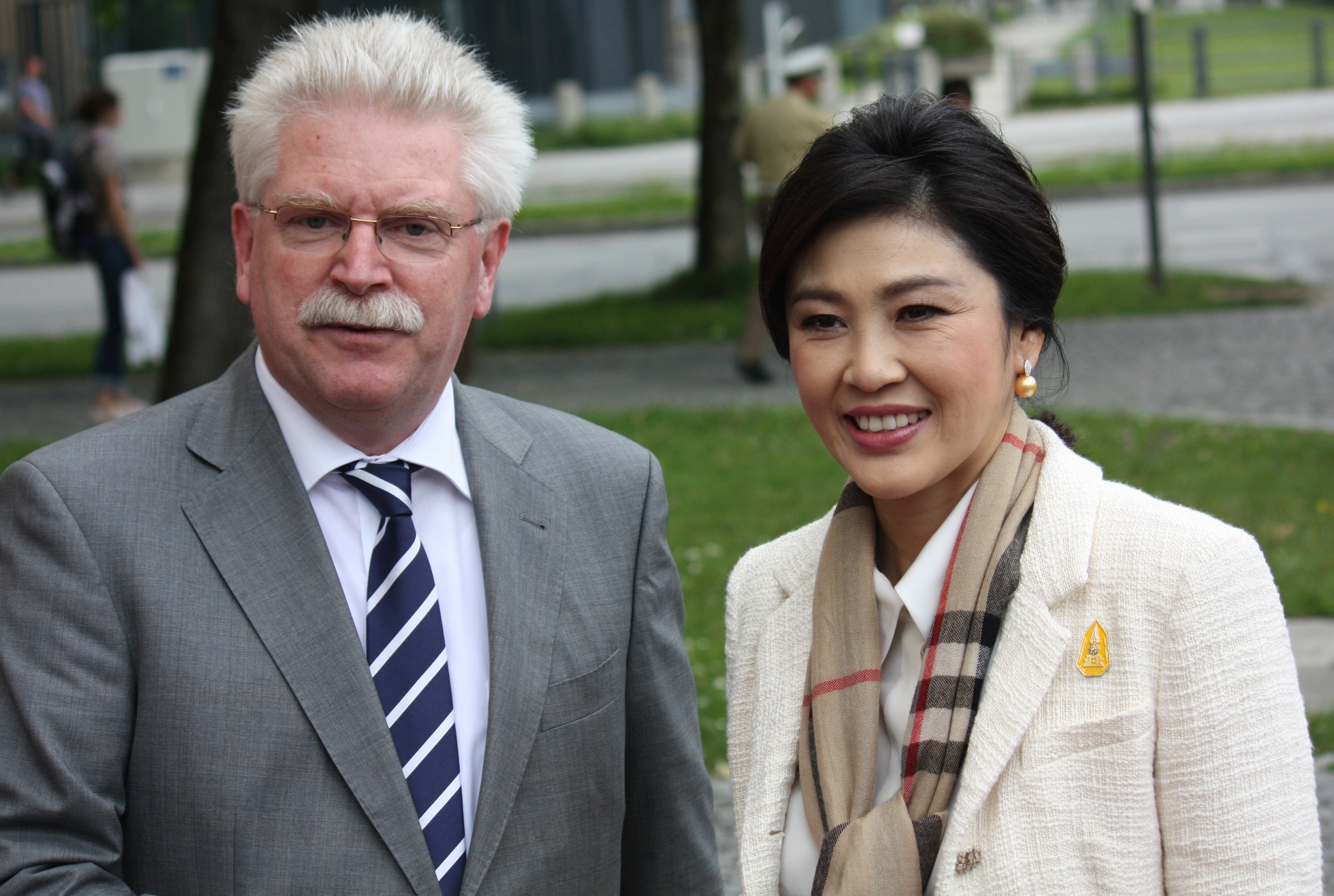
Yingluck Shinawatra in Munich, Germany with Bavarian minister for economy Martin Zeil, July 2012

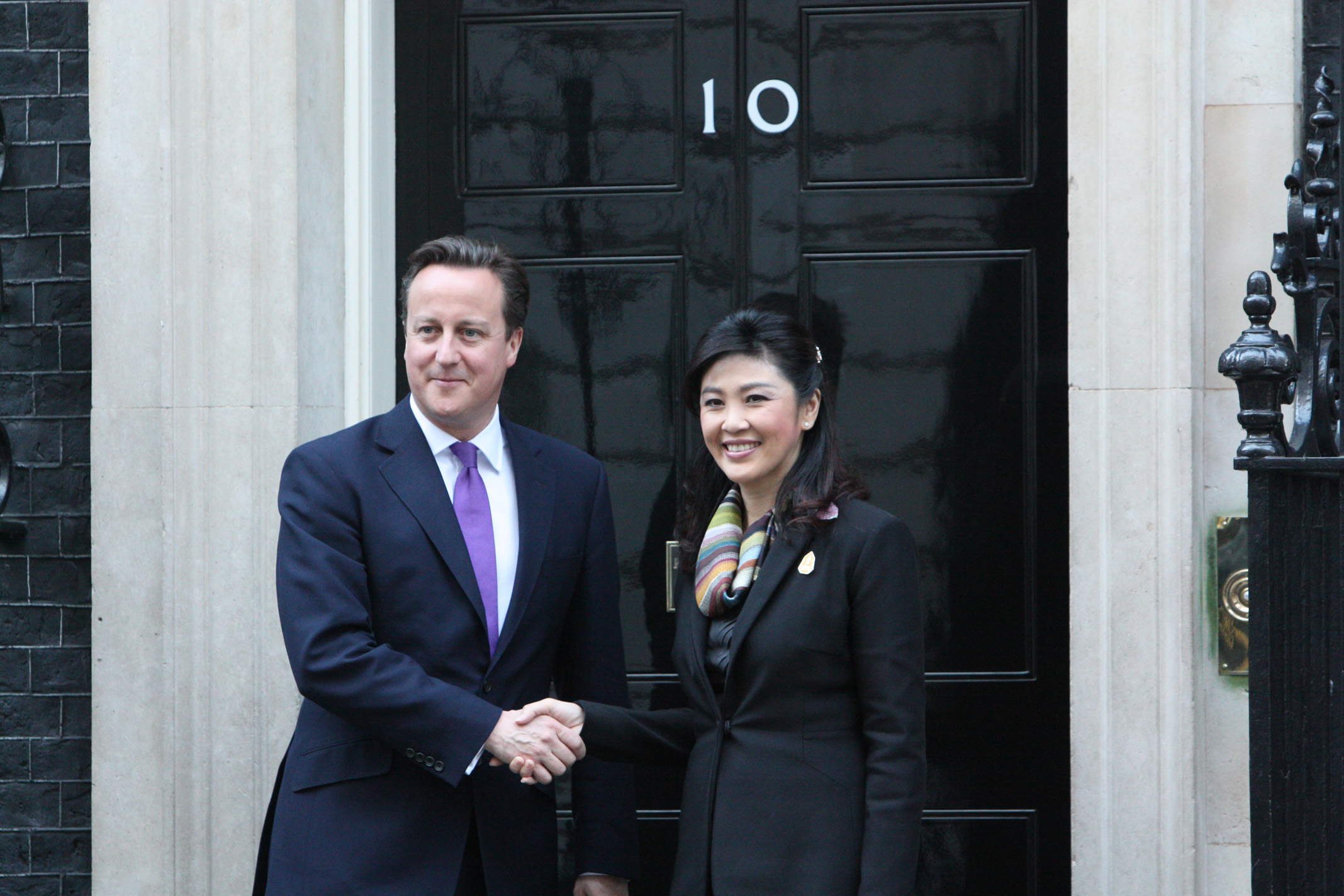
Prime Minister Yingluck Shinawatra with British Prime Minister David Cameron at 10 Downing Street in 2012

On 18 January 2012, Yingluck reshuffled her cabinet, assigning six cabinet members to new posts, naming ten new ministers and deputies, and dismissing nine members of the government. The regrouping was assessed as a step to increase loyalty to the head of government and a reaction to discontent with the government's management of the flood disaster. Especially noted was the choice of Nalinee Taveesin (Minister in the PM's Office), who is on a US blacklist for alleged business links to Zimbabwean President Robert Mugabe, and Nattawut Saikua (Deputy Minister of Agriculture), the first leader of the United Front for Democracy Against Dictatorship (UDD, or "Red Shirts") in the government. Yingluck's first cabinet had not incorporated any "Red Shirts" activists.

On 30 June 2013, the fifth reshuffle occurred in the cabinet of Yingluck, leading to changes in 18 cabinet posts. She herself assumed the post of minister of defence in the reshuffle.

=== 2013-2014 opposition protests, supreme court impeachment and coup ===
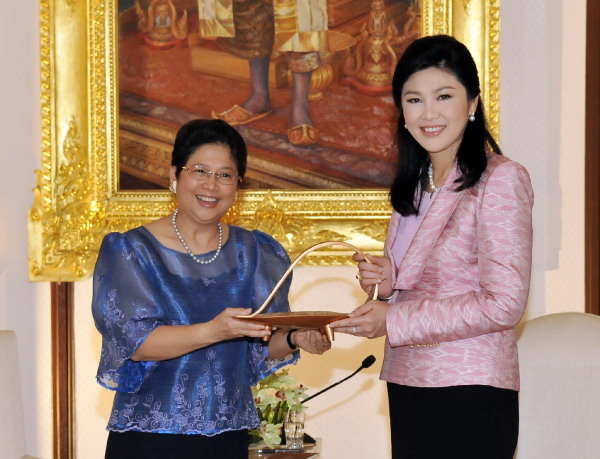
Prime Minister Yingluck with Philippine Ambassador Jocelyn Batoon-Garcia on 5 August 2013

On 9 December 2013, Yingluck dissolved the country's parliament and called early elections in the face of anti-government protests.

On 7 May 2014, the Constitutional Court unanimously dismissed Yingluck from office in consequence of her removing an appointee of an earlier government, Thawil Pliensri, from his post as National Security Council secretary-general in 2011. The court deemed the transfer unconstitutional and therefore removed Yingluck from office.

A few weeks after Yingluck was impeached, the military coup of 2014 occurred.

=== 2014 negligence of duty investigation and trial ===
As chairperson of the rice committee, Yingluck was investigated by Thailand's anti-graft agency about her role in the rice pledging scheme. Two of her former ministers were also investigated, and later sentenced for decades in prison.

Despite being chairperson of the rice committee, Yingluck admitted in the 2013 censure debate against her government that she had never attended meetings of the National Rice Policy Committee.

On 8 May 2014, the National Anti-Corruption Commission (NACC) unanimously agreed to indict Yingluck in the rice-pledging scheme corruption case citing millions of rice farmers who remain unpaid.

On 28 November, Thailand's National Legislative Assembly (NLA) denied the addition of 72 pieces of evidence to her rice-pledging case. The first hearing of her impeachment case was also scheduled to be on 9 January 2015.

On 15 January 2016, the trial against Yingluck began.

On 25 August 2017, the scheduled verdict day, Yingluck did not appear before the court, which then issued an arrest warrant for her and confiscated her ฿30,000,000 bail. 3,000 of her supporters gathered outside the court in Bangkok. Reportedly, Yingluck fled the country ahead of the judgment. Some senior members of her political party said she left Thailand the week before to go to Dubai. The pronouncement was then rescheduled to 27 September 2017.

On 27 September 2017, in her absence, she was found guilty of dereliction of duty over the rice subsidy scheme and was sentenced to five years in prison.

On 4 March 2024, the Supreme Court of Thailand acquitted Yingluck and eight others on charges of corruption over a 2013 campaign to promote her government's infrastructure projects involving allegations of mishandling 240 billion baht ($6.7 billion) and failure to conduct proper bidding processes.

On 25 April 2024, the National Anti-Corruption Commission (NACC) unanimously opted against challenging the Supreme Court's decision to dismiss the corruption charges levied against former Prime Minister Yingluck Shinawatra and to revoke the warrant for her arrest.

== Personal life ==
Yingluck's nickname is Pou (Thai: ปู, RTGS: Pu, pronounced [pūː], lit. 'crab').

She has one son, with her common law husband, Anusorn Amornchat. Anusorn was an executive of the Charoen Pokphand Group and managing director of M Link Asia Corporation PCL. Her sister, Yaowapha, is married to former prime minister Somchai Wongsawat.

In 2014, Yingluck's passports were cancelled by the military-led National Council for Peace and Order, and she was rumoured to be in London and to have a British passport. In 2019, she has been granted citizenship by the government of Serbia.

In 2019, reports surfaced alleging that Yingluck had obtained a Cambodian passport. The claim emerged after Hong Kong corporate records listed her as a director of a company registered in the territory, using what appeared to be a Cambodian travel document.

Cambodian officials initially denied issuing any passport to Yingluck. However, in July 2025, former Cambodian Prime Minister and President of the Cambodian Senate Hun Sen acknowledged that Yingluck was issued and is still using a Cambodian passport.

== Honours ==
Yingluck has received the following royal decorations in the Honours System of Thailand:

=== Royal Decorations ===
- Dame Grand Cordon (Special Class) of the Most Exalted Order of the White Elephant: 6 April 2012
- Dame Grand Cordon (Special Class) of the Most Noble Order of the Crown of Thailand: 20 March 2012
- The Boy Scout Citation Medal (First Class)

=== Volunteer Defense Corps of Thailand Rank ===
- Volunteer Defense Corps General of Volunteer Defense Corps (Thailand): 30 September 2011

== See also ==
- Pheu Thai Party
- Yingluck cabinet
- List of elected or appointed female heads of government

Political offices
Preceded by Abhisit Vejjajiva	Prime Minister of Thailand; 2011–2014	Succeeded by Prayut Chan-o-cha
Preceded by Sukampol Suwannathat	Minister of Defence of Thailand; 2013–2014	Succeeded by Prawit Wongsuwan
