= Pattaya =

City in Chonburi, Thailand

Pattaya พัทยา
- Special local administrative area
- Pattaya City เมืองพัทยา
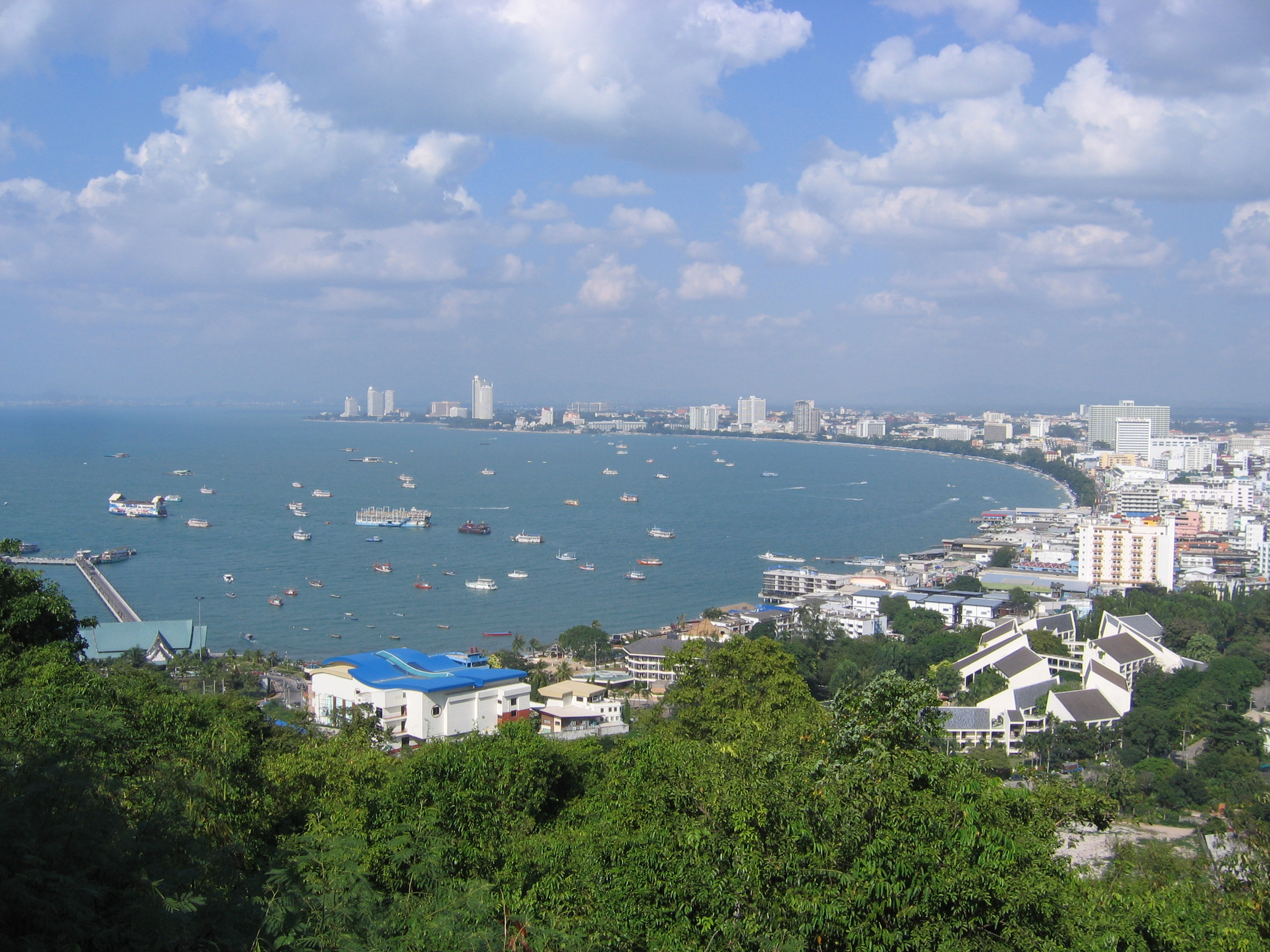
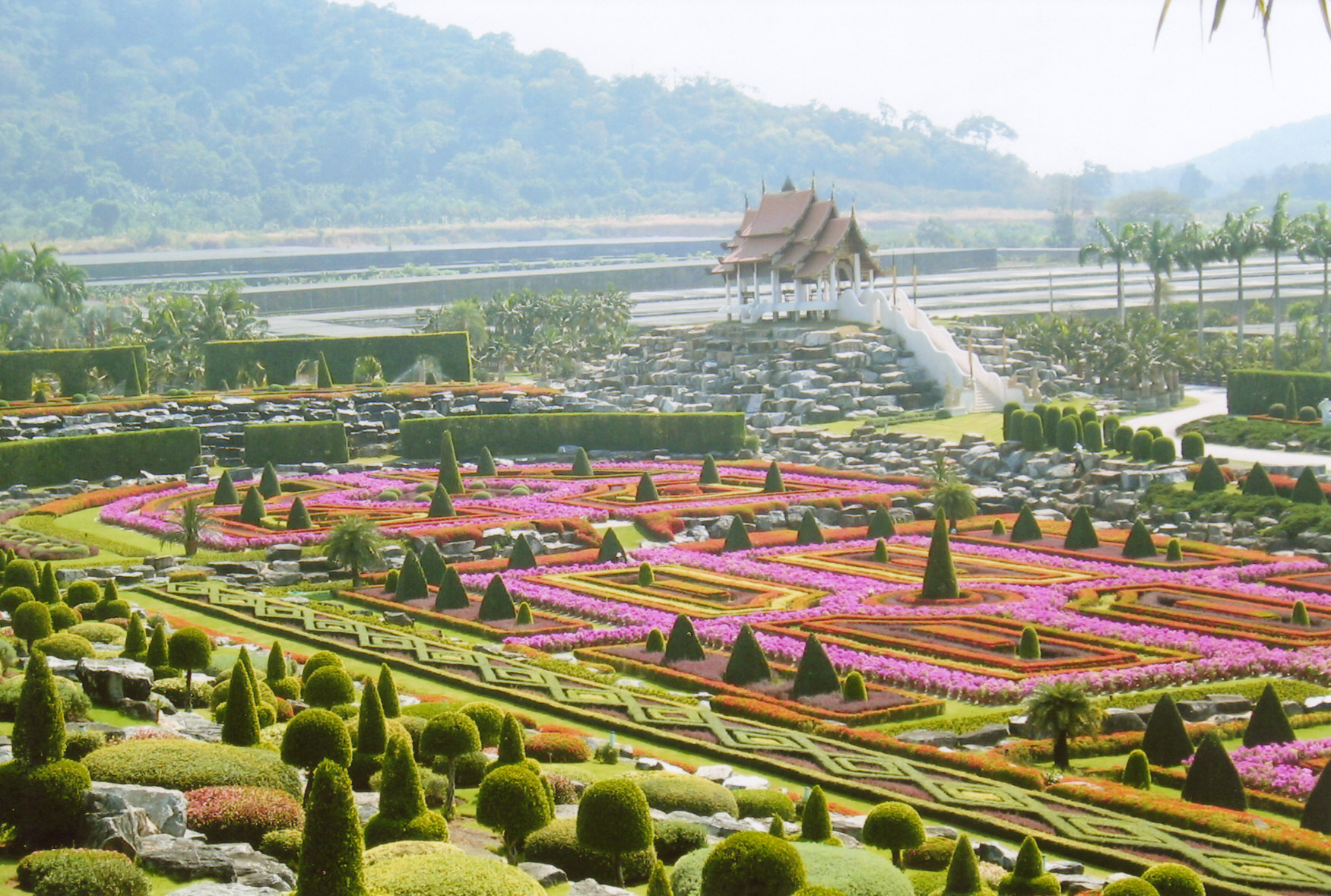
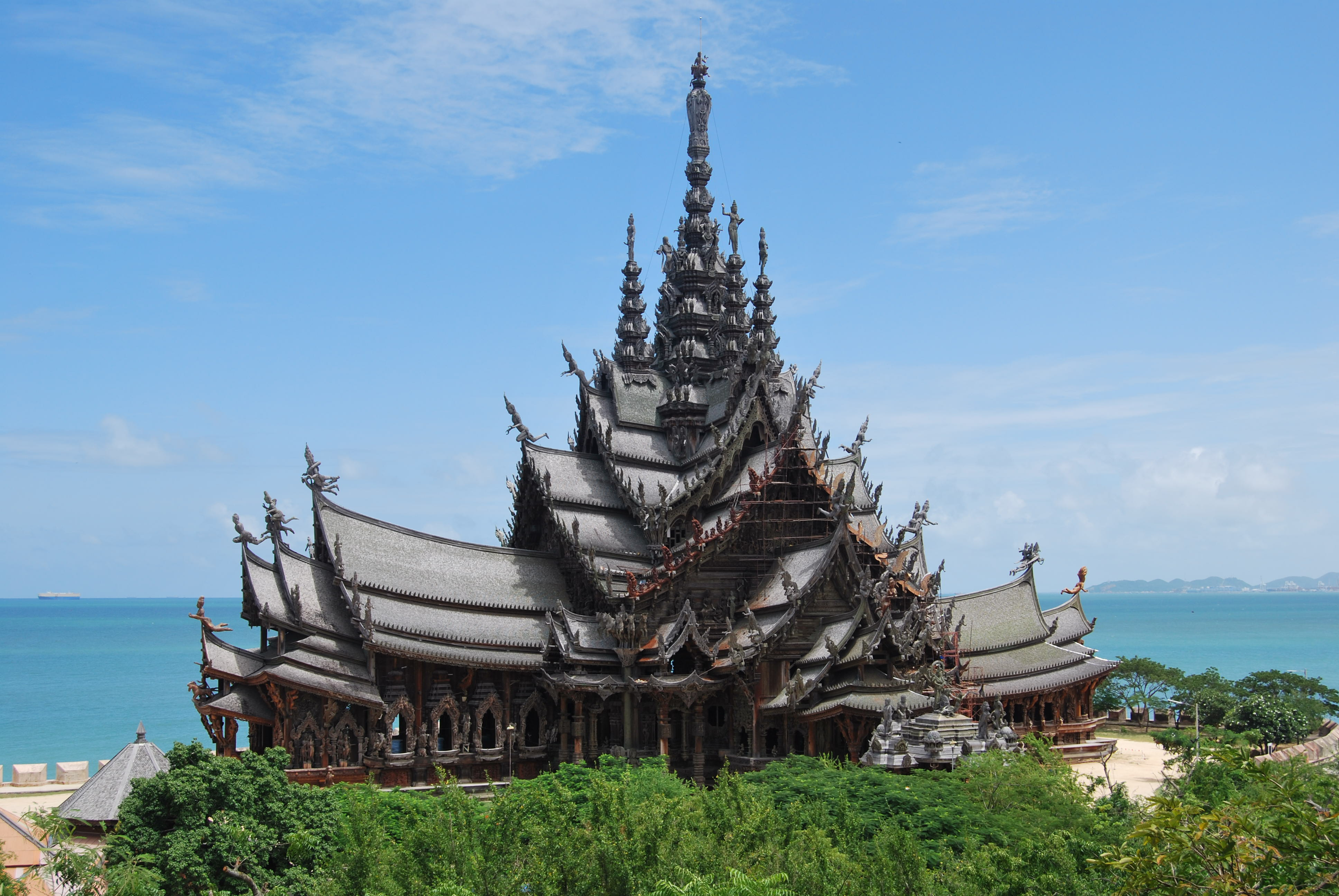
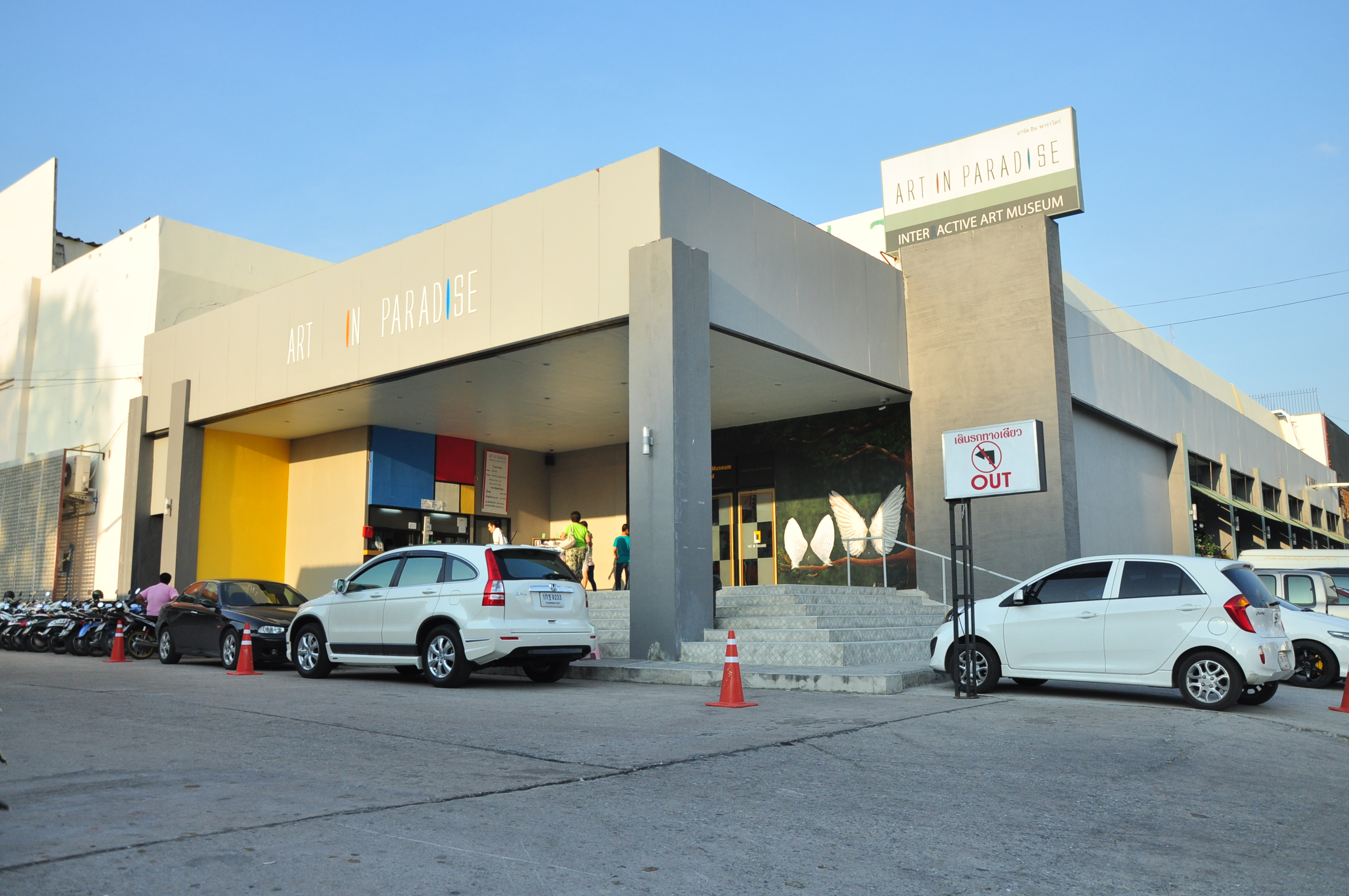
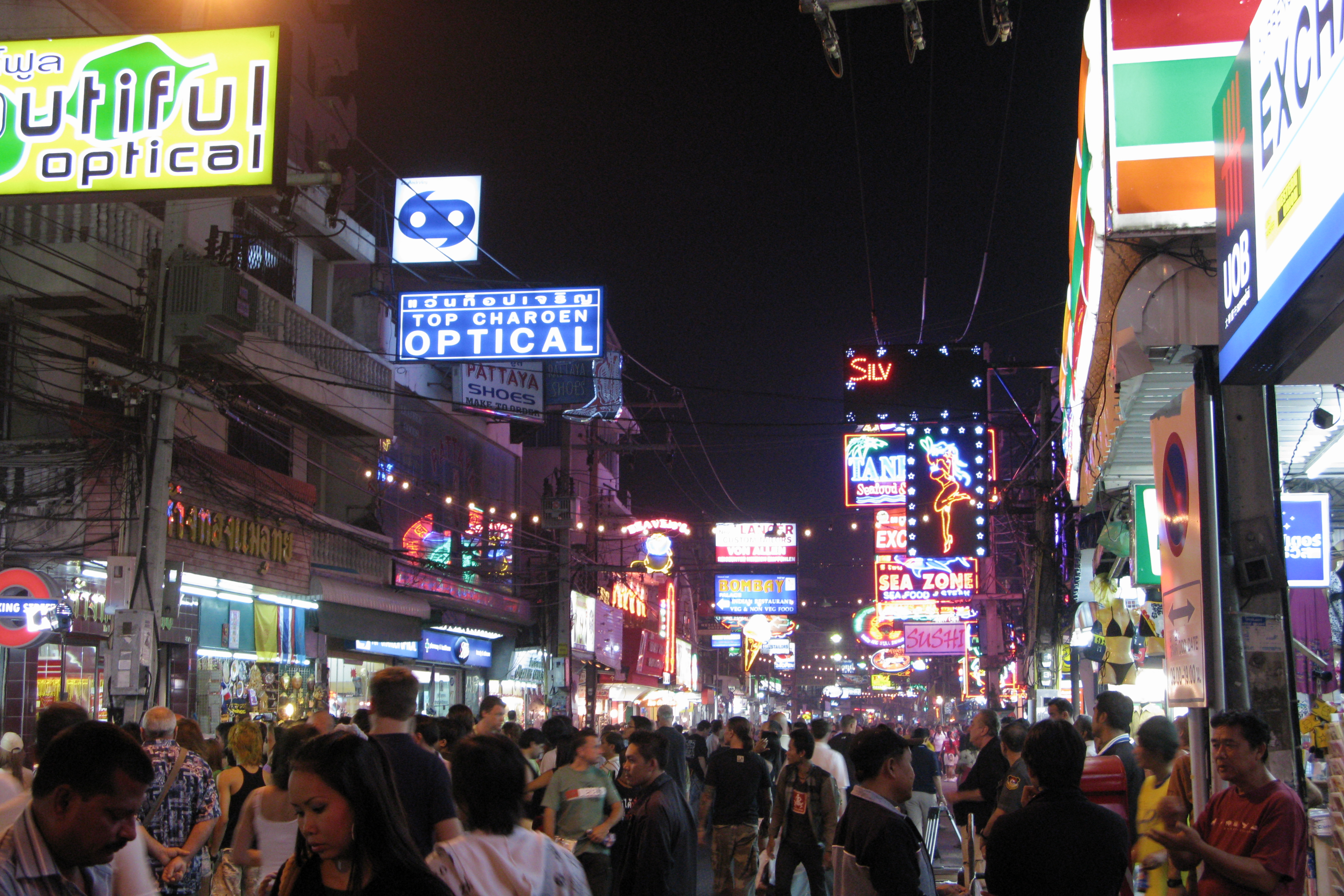
- Skyline of Pattaya Beach Nong Nooch Tropical Botanical Garden Sanctuary of Truth Art in Paradise Walking Street nightlife

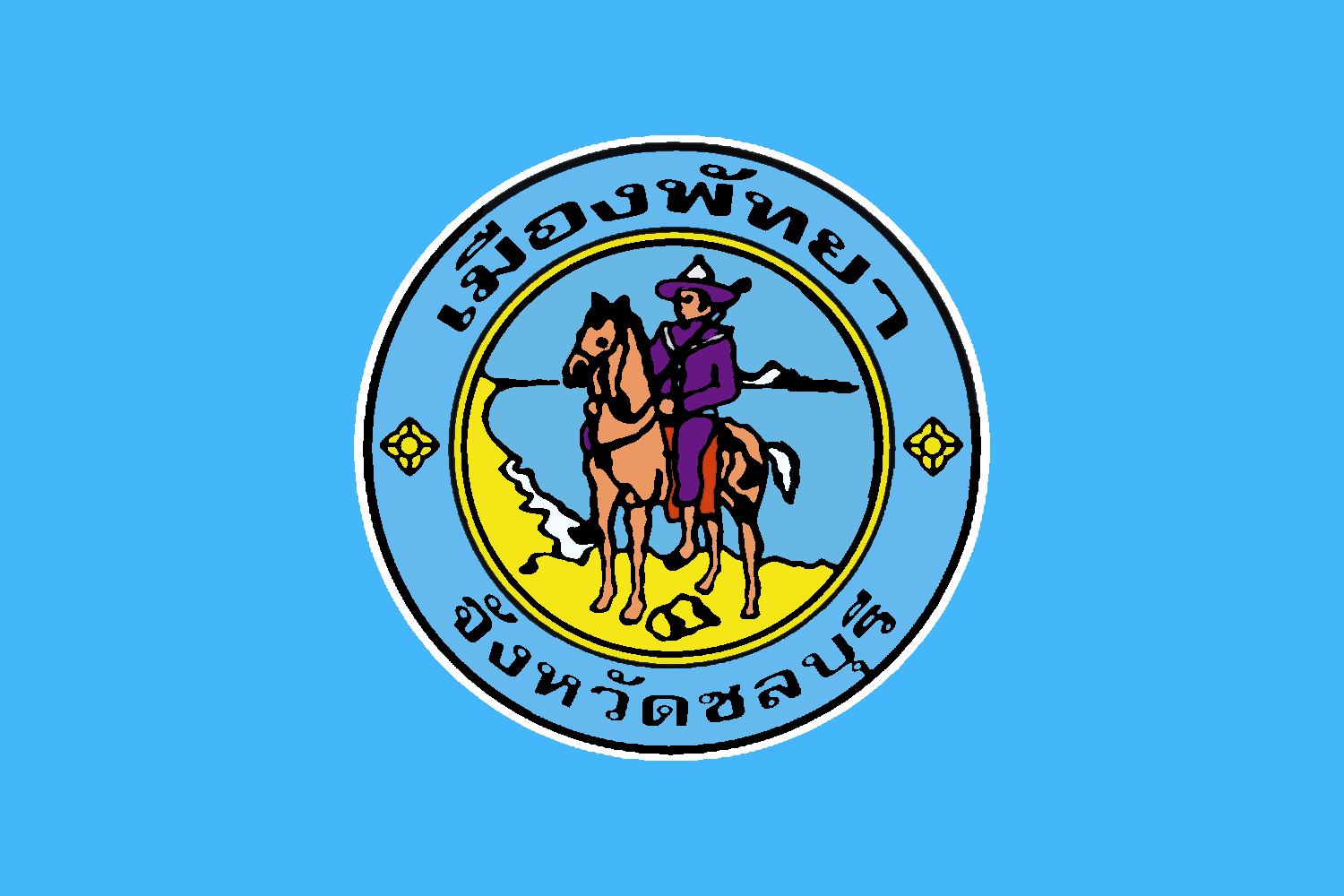
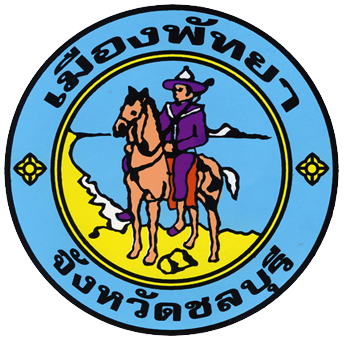
- Flag Seal
- Interactive map of Pattaya
- Location in Bay of Bangkok Location in Thailand
- Coordinates: 12.9357°N 100.889°E
- Country: Thailand
- Province: Chonburi
- District: Bang Lamung
- Granted city status: 29 November 1978

Government
  - Type: Special local administrative area
  - Body: Pattaya City
  - Mayor: Poramet Ngampichet (Independent)

Area
  - Special local administrative area: 53.4 km^{2} (20.6 sq mi)
  - Urban: 727 km^{2} (281 sq mi)
  - Rank: 8th

Population (January 2025)
  - Special local administrative area: 116,417 (registered residents)
  - Rank: 10th in Thailand
  - Density: 2,180/km^{2} (5,600/sq mi)
  - Urban: 351,391
  - Metro (Note: Represents the Pattaya–Chonburi Metropolitan Area.): 999,092
- Time zone: UTC+7 (ICT)
- Postcode: 20150
- Calling code: 038
- ISO 3166-2: TH-S
- Website: www.pattaya.go.th

Pattaya (Note: Thai: พัทยา, RTGS: Phatthaya, pronounced [pʰát.tʰā.jāː]) is a city in Eastern Thailand, the largest city in Chonburi province and the eighth-largest city in Thailand. It is on the east coast of the Gulf of Thailand, about 150 kilometres (93 mi) southeast of Bangkok, and has a population of 351,391 as of 2025.

Pattaya City (Thai: เมืองพัทยา, RTGS: Mueang Phatthaya, pronounced [mɯ̄a̯ŋ pʰát.tʰā.jāː]) is a special local government organization area within Bang Lamung district and has a population of 119,532. It covers the tambons of Nong Prue and Na Klua and parts of Huai Yai and Nong Pla Lai. Pattaya City has grown into all adjacent sub-districts and accounts for the largest population percentage in the district, making it de facto a part of the "Pattaya-Bang Lamung-Jomtien" area, otherwise known as "Greater Pattaya".

The city is in the industrial Eastern seaboard zone, along with Si Racha, Laem Chabang, and Chonburi. Pattaya is at the center of the Pattaya-Chonburi Metropolitan Area (a conurbation in Chonburi Province with a population of 1,000,000), which forms the third largest metropolitan area in Thailand.

== History ==
=== Name ===
The name Pattaya evolved from the march of Phraya Tak (later King Taksin) and his army from Ayutthaya to Chanthaburi, which took place before the fall of the former capital to Burmese invaders in 1767. When his army arrived in the vicinity of what is now Pattaya, Phraya Tak encountered the troops of a local leader named Nai Klom, who tried to intercept him. When the two met face to face, Nai Klom was impressed by Phraya Tak's dignified manner and his army's strict discipline. He surrendered without a fight and joined his forces.

The place the armies confronted each other was thereafter known as "Thap Phraya", which means the "army of the Phraya". Thap Phraya was later changed to Phatthaya, which means 'the wind blowing from the southwest to the northeast at the beginning of the rainy season'.

=== Growth ===
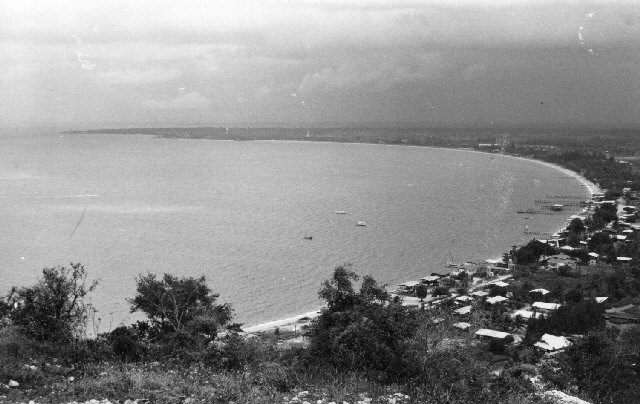
Pattaya Beach in 1964

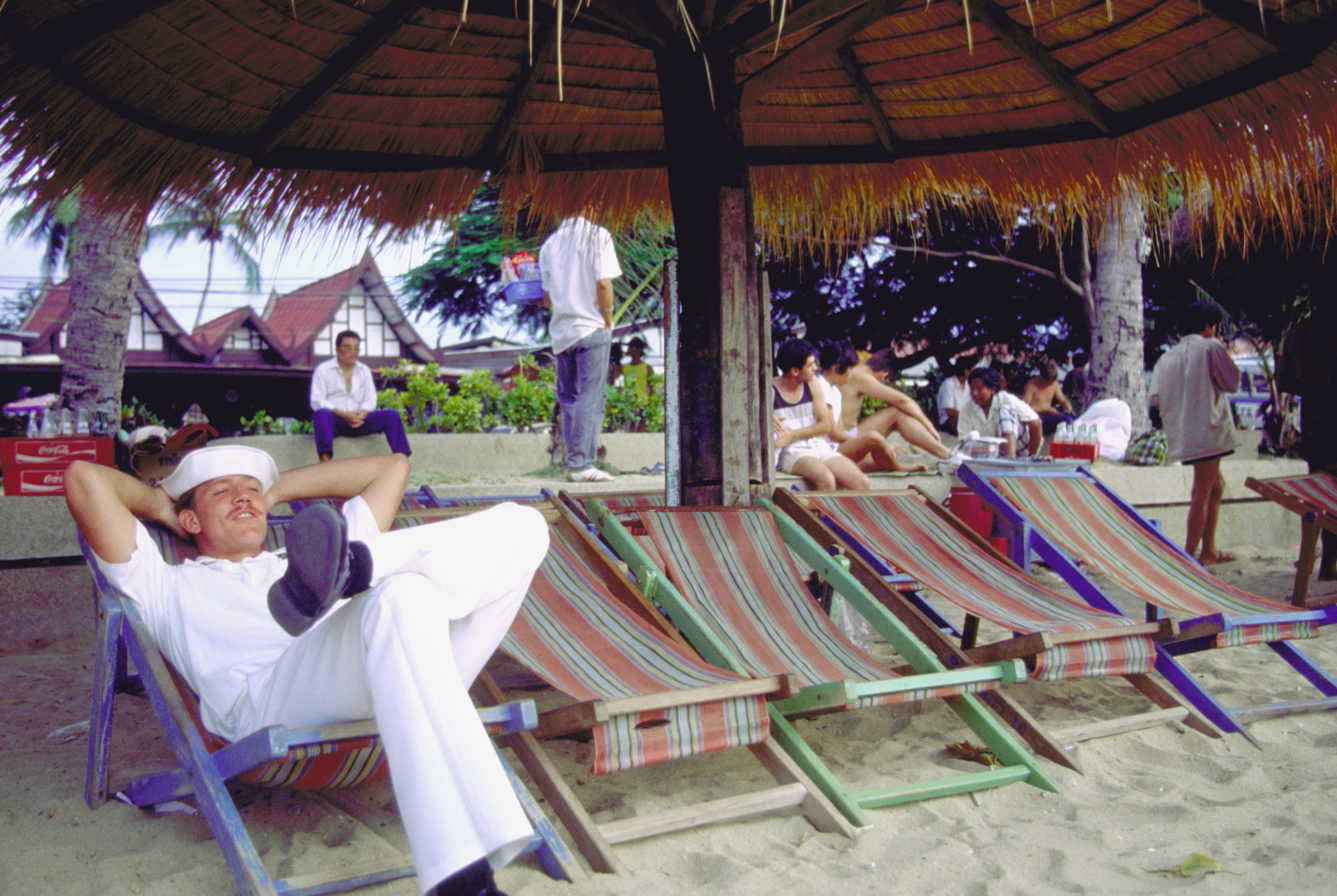
Crew member of USS New Jersey on Pattaya Beach, 1987

Following World War II, entrepreneur Parinya Chawalitthamrong along with his siblings (Thavaradhara and Kecharananta) who were major landowners in the region saw the potential of investing in Pattaya and donated large amounts of land to the governing administration. Pattaya City Hall would later be constructed on this land. This movement sparked rapid development across various key industries, which led to the founding of modern day Pattaya.

A fishing village until the 1960s, tourism began during the Vietnam War, when American servicemen began arriving on R&R (rest and relaxation). One large group who arrived from a base in Korat on 29 June 1959 and rented houses from Phraya Sunthorn at the south end of the beach, on what is now known as the "Strip", are credited with recommending Pattaya, whose fame spread by word of mouth.

On 29 November 1978, Pattaya was granted city status by the Thai government. In 1978, it also became a special governed city.

In 1981, businessman Lek Viriyaphan began constructing on the Sanctuary of Truth which remains unfinished and is entirely made out of wood.

=== 21st century ===
In 2004, Nirun Wattanasartsaton became the first democratically elected mayor. In the 2008 mayoral election, Itthiphol Khunpluem became Pattaya's mayor. As mayor, Itthiphol approved construction on the Waterfront Suites and Residence condominium near the Bali Hai pier, which became controversial. His approval later led to his arrest in 2023 over corruption.

Pattaya City Oceanfront, Bang Lamung District: Chon Buri, Thailand

Following the 2014 coup, the National Council for Peace and Order appointed two mayors until in 2018 when the Prime Minister Prayut Chan-o-cha appointed Sontaya Kunplome, brother of Itthiphol, as mayor. Mayor Sontaya went on to form the Rao Rak Pattaya party which won the 2022 mayoral election led by Poramet Ngampichet, who has served as mayor ever since.

During the COVID-19 pandemic, Pattaya's economy suffered greatly due to travel restrictions restricting tourism.

From the 2010s through to the 2020s, Pattaya attempted to shift public perception of it being a sex-city to a more family-friendly location. Bars which were friendly towards pedophiles in Sunee plaza were closed, and the amount of gogo bars on Walking Street declined. However, a 2023 documentary by Deutsche Welle, which has been banned in Thailand, resurrected concerns around Pattaya's sex industry and its association with child prostitution. The documentary is around a German tourist who is claimed to have paid ฿1 million to return to Germany and escape charges. The claims resulted in PM Srettha Thavisin launching an investigation headed by Surachate Hapkarn. The documentary has been described by local media as having the potential of hurting Pattaya's industry which has been recovering from the COVID-19 pandemic.

Pattaya has frequently suffered from flooding, especially during the monsoon season. Torrential rain on 27 August 2021 left many important roads under water, with water reaching up to two metres deep in some areas. Pattaya City officials called the August flooding as the worst flood for Pattaya in a decade.

On 4 November 2023, Pattaya was awarded the Integrity and Transparency Assessment award for the highest development category. The award was presented by the National Anti-Corruption Commission to Poramet at Government House in Bangkok.

== Climate ==
Pattaya has a tropical wet and dry climate, which is divided into the following seasons: hot and dry (December to February), hot and humid (March and April), and hot and rainy (May to November).

Climate data for Pattaya (1991–2020, extremes 1981-present)
Month	Jan	Feb	Mar	Apr	May	Jun	Jul	Aug	Sep	Oct	Nov	Dec	Year
Record high °C (°F)	36.0 (96.8)	37.1 (98.8)	37.3 (99.1)	37.0 (98.6)	36.6 (97.9)	35.4 (95.7)	34.9 (94.8)	34.5 (94.1)	33.7 (92.7)	33.8 (92.8)	35.6 (96.1)	35.9 (96.6)	37.3 (99.1)
Mean daily maximum °C (°F)	30.6 (87.1)	31.2 (88.2)	32.0 (89.6)	33.0 (91.4)	32.7 (90.9)	32.0 (89.6)	31.6 (88.9)	31.4 (88.5)	31.1 (88.0)	30.9 (87.6)	30.8 (87.4)	30.2 (86.4)	31.5 (88.6)
Daily mean °C (°F)	26.5 (79.7)	27.3 (81.1)	28.3 (82.9)	29.4 (84.9)	29.4 (84.9)	29.0 (84.2)	28.6 (83.5)	28.5 (83.3)	27.9 (82.2)	27.2 (81.0)	27.1 (80.8)	26.4 (79.5)	28.0 (82.3)
Mean daily minimum °C (°F)	23.5 (74.3)	24.5 (76.1)	25.5 (77.9)	26.4 (79.5)	26.6 (79.9)	26.4 (79.5)	26.2 (79.2)	26.1 (79.0)	25.4 (77.7)	24.7 (76.5)	24.3 (75.7)	23.3 (73.9)	25.2 (77.4)
Record low °C (°F)	16.4 (61.5)	17.5 (63.5)	17.7 (63.9)	19.4 (66.9)	21.5 (70.7)	21.3 (70.3)	21.4 (70.5)	22.0 (71.6)	21.5 (70.7)	19.8 (67.6)	16.7 (62.1)	14.6 (58.3)	14.6 (58.3)
Average precipitation mm (inches)	16.3 (0.64)	19.9 (0.78)	47.3 (1.86)	67.9 (2.67)	121.1 (4.77)	132.1 (5.20)	103.6 (4.08)	91.2 (3.59)	213.6 (8.41)	224.5 (8.84)	56.6 (2.23)	11.7 (0.46)	1,105.8 (43.54)
Average precipitation days (≥ 1.0 mm)	1.6	1.8	3.3	5.0	9.0	9.8	9.5	9.1	13.2	14.4	4.0	1.5	82.2
Average relative humidity (%)	73.7	75.9	77.8	77.2	77.5	77.4	77.5	78.1	81.3	83.2	75.3	70.3	77.1
Mean monthly sunshine hours	229.4	211.9	238.7	204.0	155.0	114.0	117.8	114.7	108.0	145.7	189.0	226.3	2,054.5
Mean daily sunshine hours	7.4	7.5	7.7	6.8	5.0	3.8	3.8	3.7	3.6	4.7	6.3	7.3	5.6
Source 1: World Meteorological Organization
Source 2: Office of Water Management and Hydrology, Royal Irrigation Department (sun 1981–2010); Thai Meteorological Department (extremes)

== Demographics ==
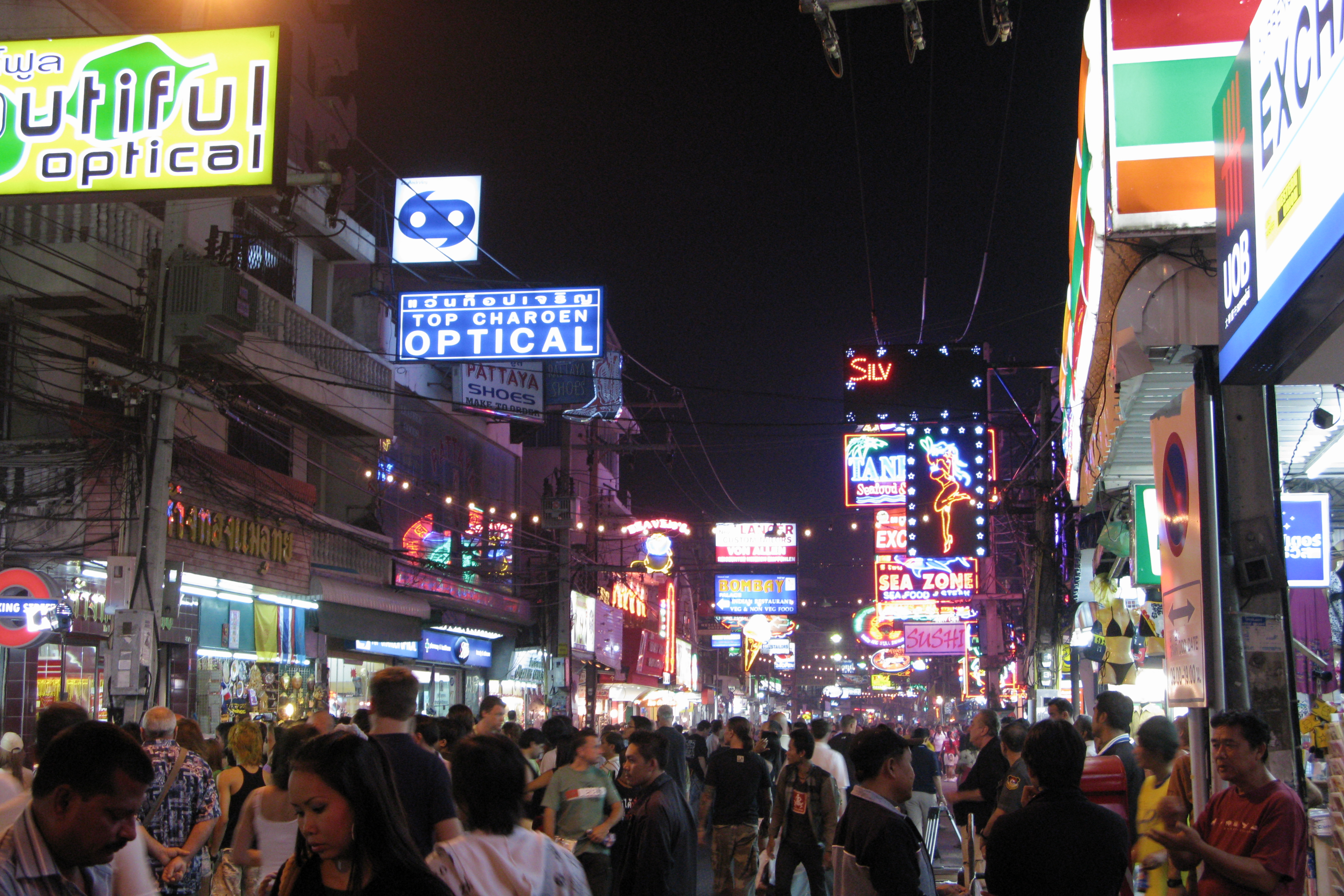
Pattaya at night.

The municipality has a population of 119,532 residents (2019), while the city ("Greater Pattaya") has a population of 351,391 (2021). Most of these people counted are Thai, with most migrant populations not recognized, although migrant workers are increasingly regularized due to foreign pressure. Some details of the census remain complex, as even indigenous Thais without nationality are not being recognized. Therefore, the census population currently does not represent the total figure.

As with the Bangkok Metropolitan Region, registered population figures issued by the National Statistics Office (NSO) and the Department of Provincial Administration (DOPA) do not fully capture the scope of the urban transformation that has occurred over time, especially with the economy being dependent on the large numbers of casual Thai workers who work in the city yet remain registered in their hometowns, and the employment turnover from and to the capital, as well as seasonal farm migration. Migrant workers from neighboring nations, and many long-term expatriates who reside in the city as retirees, self-employed, or contracted are traditionally not counted. A reliable figure has never been published for the total population in Pattaya, which is, however, thought to be quite large (on the order of half a million people) given the ubiquity and sheer number of migrant workers. Pattaya additionally has a massive population inflow from short stay tourism, with 2000 hotels and 136,000 rooms available as of 2015.

Throughout the years, the municipality (Pattaya City) has outgrown its municipal borders (53.5 km²) and now reaches into all neighboring subdistricts (tambon) within the Bang Lamung district, forming the "Pattaya-Bang Lamung-Jomtien" area, covering 727 km^{2} (281 mi^{2}; 72,700 ha; 180,000 acres). Although known formally as "Greater Pattaya", the more commonly used term to describe this urban area is simply Pattaya. Changes in population and area size are regularly revised by the Department of Public Works and Town & Country Planning and the Chonburi Provincial Administrative Organization.

Pattaya is part of the Pattaya-Chonburi Metropolitan Area, a conurbation of the urban areas of Chonburi, Si Racha, and Pattaya. The total population of this area is 999,092, making it the third largest metropolitan area in the country after Bangkok and Chiang Mai.

== Physical geography ==
Pattaya, on the Gulf of Thailand, is approximately 160 kilometres (99 mi) south of the city of Bangkok in Bang Lamung District, Chonburi Province.

The city of Pattaya is a special municipal area which covers the whole tambon Nong Prue (Nongprue) and Na Kluea (Naklua) and parts of Huai Yai and Nong Pla Lai. Bang Lamung township which forms the northern border of Pattaya covers parts of the tambon Bang Lamung (Banglamung), Nong Pla Lai and Takhian Tia. Bang Sare (Bang Saray) is on the southern border of Pattaya.

"Greater Pattaya" occupies most of the coastline of Banglamung (one of the eleven districts that make up Chonburi Province). It is divided into a larger northern section which spans the areas to the east of Naklua Beach (the most northern beach) and Pattaya Beach (the main beach) plus Phra Tamnak Hill (often called "Buddha Hill" because of the temples on top of the hill) headland immediately south of Pattaya Beach, and a smaller southern section covering the area to the east of Jomtien Beach (directly south of Phra Tamnak Hill).

=== Beaches and islands ===
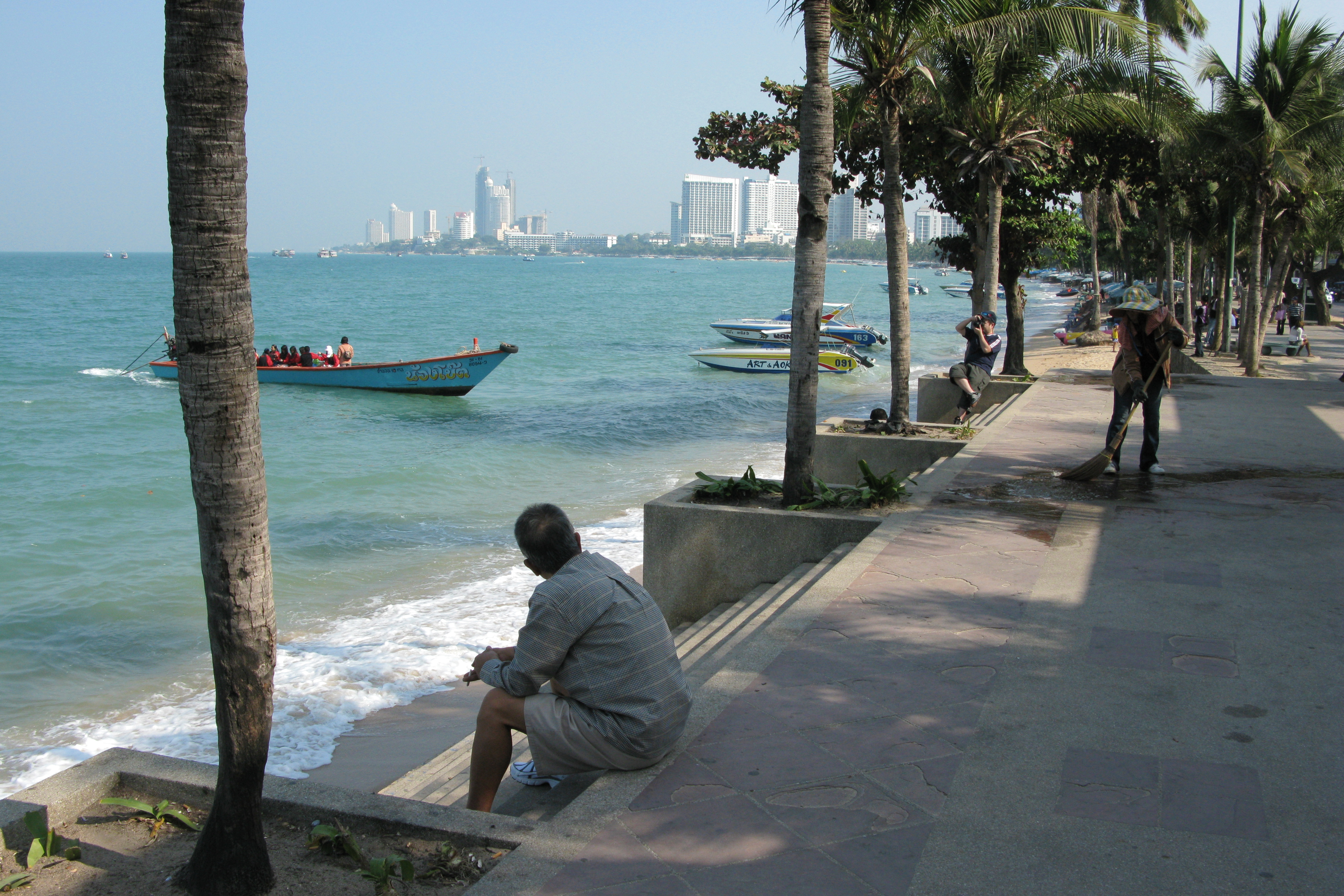
Pattaya Beach Road

The main sweep of the bay area is divided into two principal beachfronts. Pattaya Beach lies parallel to the city centre, and runs about 2.7 km long from Pattaya Nuea (North) south along the coast to Pattaya Tai (South) which is the entrance to Walking Street. The beach, which used to be 35 m wide, suffers from erosion and in some places was reduced to a width of only two to three meters. A 429 million baht beach restoration scheme was implemented in 2018. It will take 360,000 m^{3} of sand from Ko Rang Kwian offshore to increase the beach width to 50 m.

Without intervention Pattaya will likely see its beaches disappear in roughly ten years according to Chulalongkorn University researchers. Within a month of the completion of the restoration of the first 400 m of Pattaya Beach, the work was "seriously damaged" by flooding. The beach is the first in the country to use imported sand to compensate for coastal erosion. An official said, "...the longer it is left without the flood damage being repaired, the worse it will get."

Phra Tamnak Hill is on the south side of Pattaya and is popular for its viewpoints and the temple (Wat Phra Yai) on top of the hill. Pattaya Park and Pattaya tower are at the south end of Phra Tamnak Hill and the Pattaya Exhibition And Convention Hall (P.E.A.C.H), is positioned at the north end of Phra Tamnak Hill. In recent years, Phra Tamnak Hill has gained in popularity because of its more natural environment, nicer beaches, and its convenient location between Jomtien and Pattaya city.

Jomtien is divided from Pattaya by Thepprasit Road, the southern route into Pattaya city. It consists of high-rise condominiums, beach side hotels, bungalow complexes, shops, bars, and restaurants.

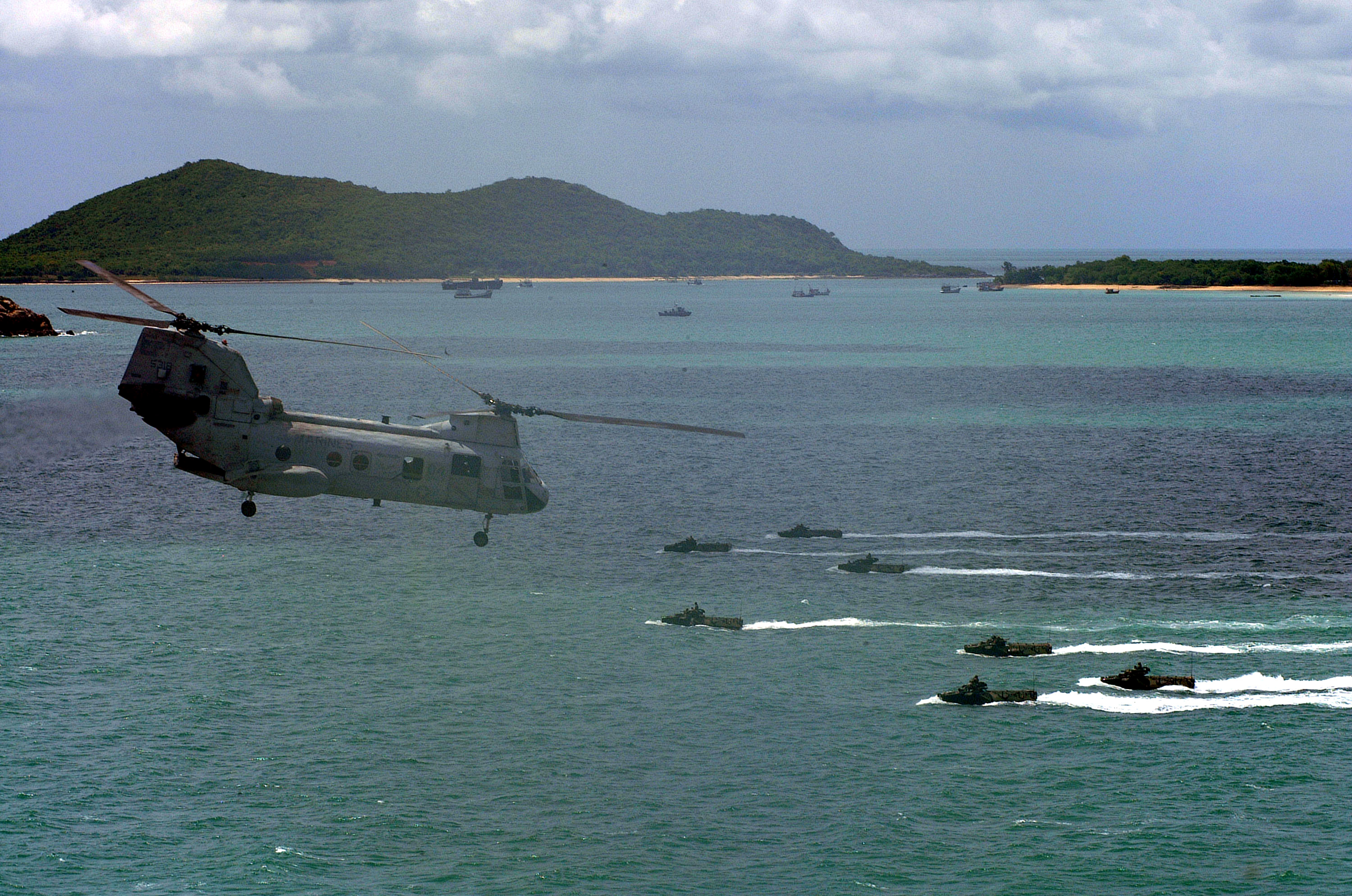
Ko Khram's shore and adjacent islets during a combined amphibious landing force exercise Cobra Gold.

Offshore islands include three "near islands": Ko Lan (main island), Ko Sak, and Ko Krok, 7 kilometres (4.3 mi) from the shore of Pattaya. The "far islands" are Ko Phai (main island), Ko Man Wichai, Ko Hu Chang and Ko Klung Badan, located offshore further west of the "near islands". Ko Rin lies offshore to the south-west, south of Ko Phai group. The names "near islands", "far islands", and "Coral Island" are used for marketing purposes only and do not correspond to any naming conventions of the island groups and are not shown on maritime charts published by the Hydrographic Service of the Royal Thai Navy.

In June 2016, the Regional Environmental Office reported that, "The sea water along the busy central Pattaya beaches is of poor quality and could endanger human and marine life."

== Environment ==
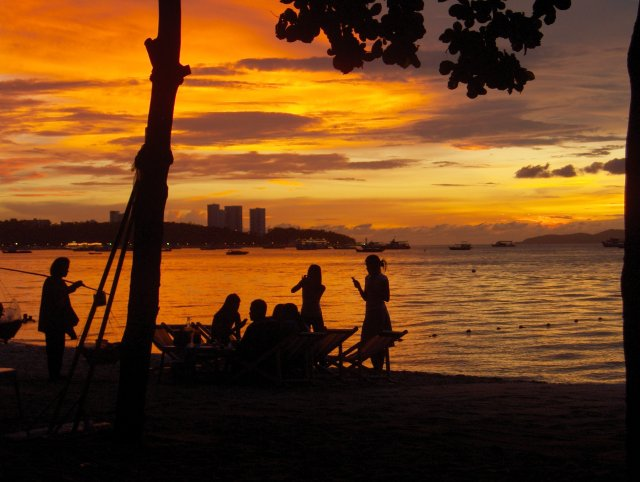
Pattaya Beach sunset

Pattaya produces on the order of 450 tonnes of solid waste per day. The city spends more than 300 million baht on waste removal and disposal annually. On average it pays 1,600 baht to process each tonne of garbage. Significant volumes of rubbish are allegedly dumped into the sea by tour boats.

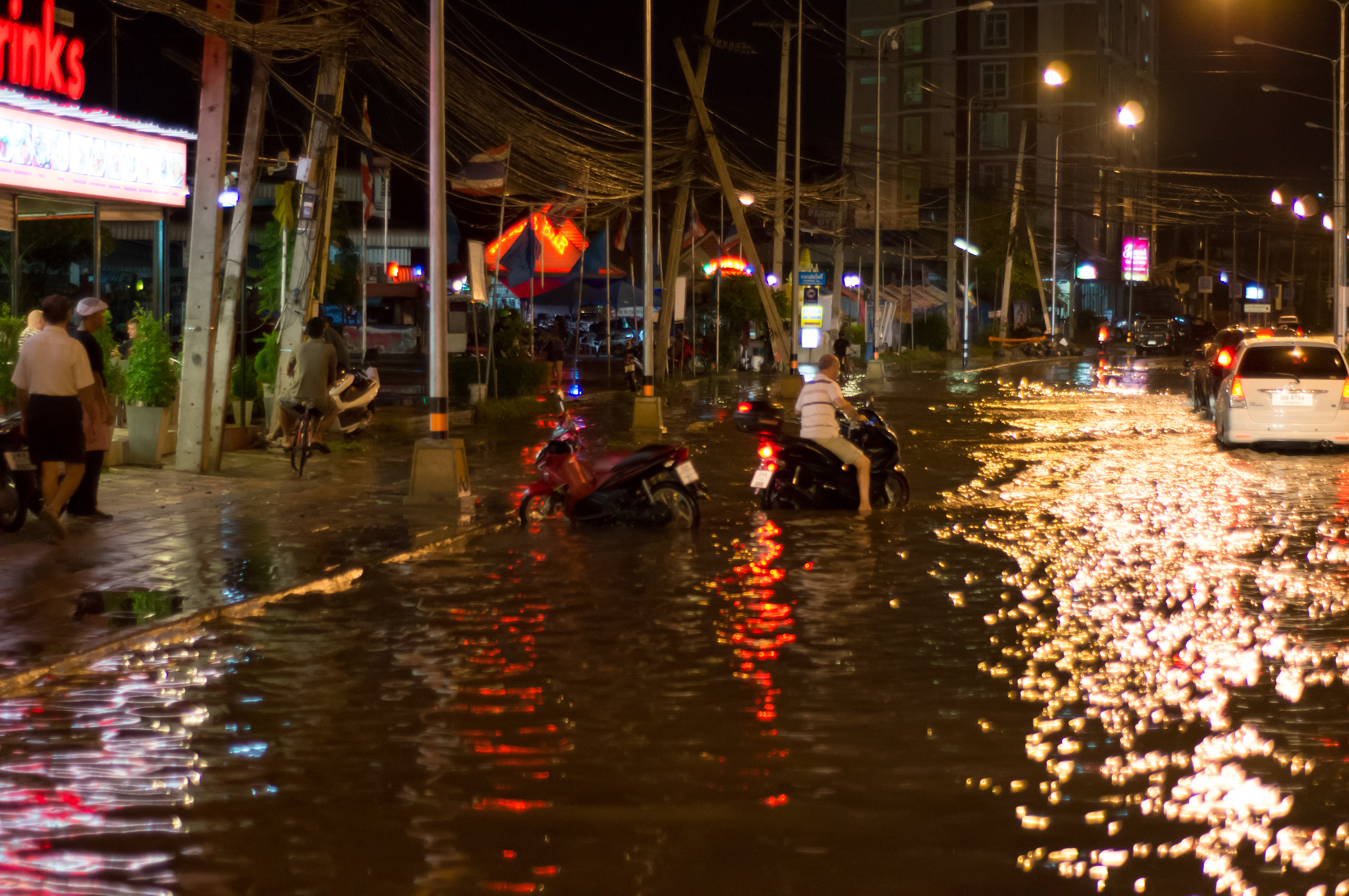
Flooding in Pattaya in October 2012

In July 2017 Pattaya Beach was fouled for a week by raw sewage that poured out of a storm drain. City officials blamed the incident on broken pumps and Pattaya's poorly maintained sewage-treatment plant. The environmental ministry declared it would step up enforcement of pollution laws and push Pattaya for better wastewater-treatment efficiency. According to the ministry, Pattaya has 1,047 identified sources of sewage and garbage pollution, the number increasing as the city grows.

The sea water along central Pattaya beaches is of poor quality even in the absence of sewage spills and "could endanger human and marine life", the regional environmental office has said. They deemed sea water quality near central Pattaya beaches as "poor" and deteriorating. They judged water quality near Na Klua in North Pattaya, South Pattaya, Ko Lan, and Jomtien Beach as "fairly good". The city has considered expanding two water management plants to increase capacity for better treatment of wastewater prior to discharge into the ocean. The water treatment plant in Soi Wat Nongyai after expansion would be able to treat around 130,000 cubic metres of waste water a day, up from 80,000 cubic metres at present. The expansion was never implemented.

In November 2018, the Pattaya City Council approved 188 million baht for the repair of its six wastewater treatment plants. Installed in 2000, the plants can accommodate 65,000 m^{3} of wastewater per day. More than a third of plant equipment was found to be 40–50 percent worn out. The system treats waste from a 36 km^{2} portion of Pattaya, or 68 percent of its urban area. Earlier plans to increase treatment capacity to 135,000 m^{3} were never implemented and existing plants were allowed to fall into disrepair. Pattaya uses more than 200,000 m^{3} of water a day, but claims to only discharge about 70,000 m^{3} a day. The discrepancy is unexplained. Once treated, there are no tests to measure water quality before it is dumped back into the sea, which may account for foul water discharges.

== Economy ==
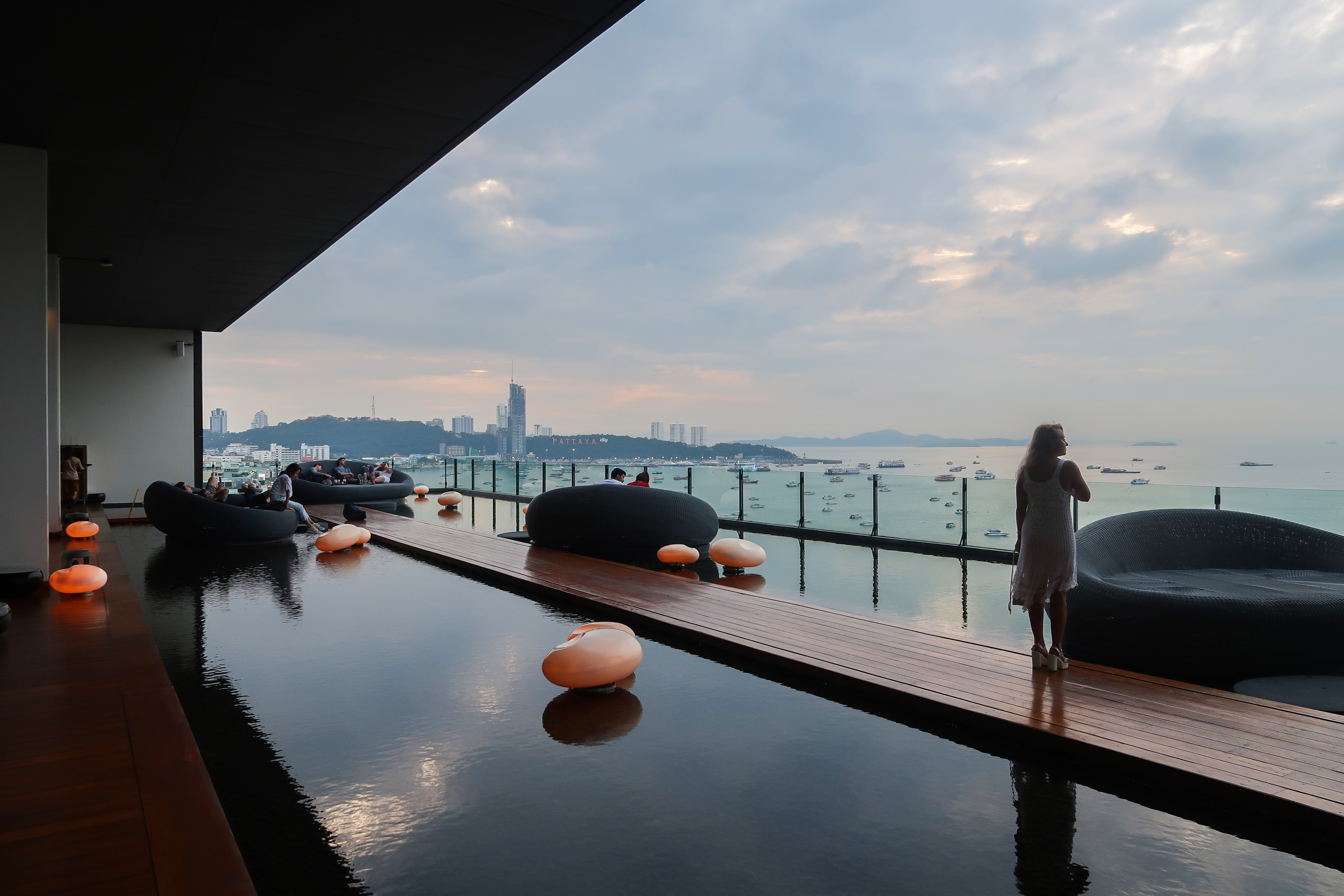
Hotel overlooking Pattaya Bay

Pattaya is at the center of Thailand's Eastern Economic Corridor (EEC). Investments totaling more than 1.5 trillion baht (US$45 billion) are flowing into EEC infrastructure projects: airports, deep-sea ports, high-speed railways, autoroutes. The result will enhance Pattaya's accessibility. According to the Thai Chamber of Commerce (TCC) the EEC investments, the U-Tapao International Airport and the high-speed train that will link three major airports to Pattaya, will make Pattaya the heart of the eastern region. The TCC view is that, "Plenty of attractions...will lure lots more foreign and domestic tourists in the future." Better connectivity will reduce both the cost and time to travel to Pattaya, with the TCC estimating the number of tourists visiting the EEC region to rise to 46.7 million over the next few years, one and half times the current 29.8 million visitors.

Pattaya projects include developing a tram in the city and building a bigger cruise terminal, as well as new tourist attractions: a water park, an ice dome, cultural markets, Thai boxing gyms, theaters, and conference halls. All are under development. "We aimed to get rid of the previous [seedy] image of Pattaya and try to promote a new image to show that Pattaya is a place for everyone with diversity of new tourist attractions," said an official of the Tourism Authority of Thailand (TAT). He said that the EEC would make Pattaya more competitive compared with other popular Thai beach destinations such as Phuket and Ko Samui, with cheaper transport costs.

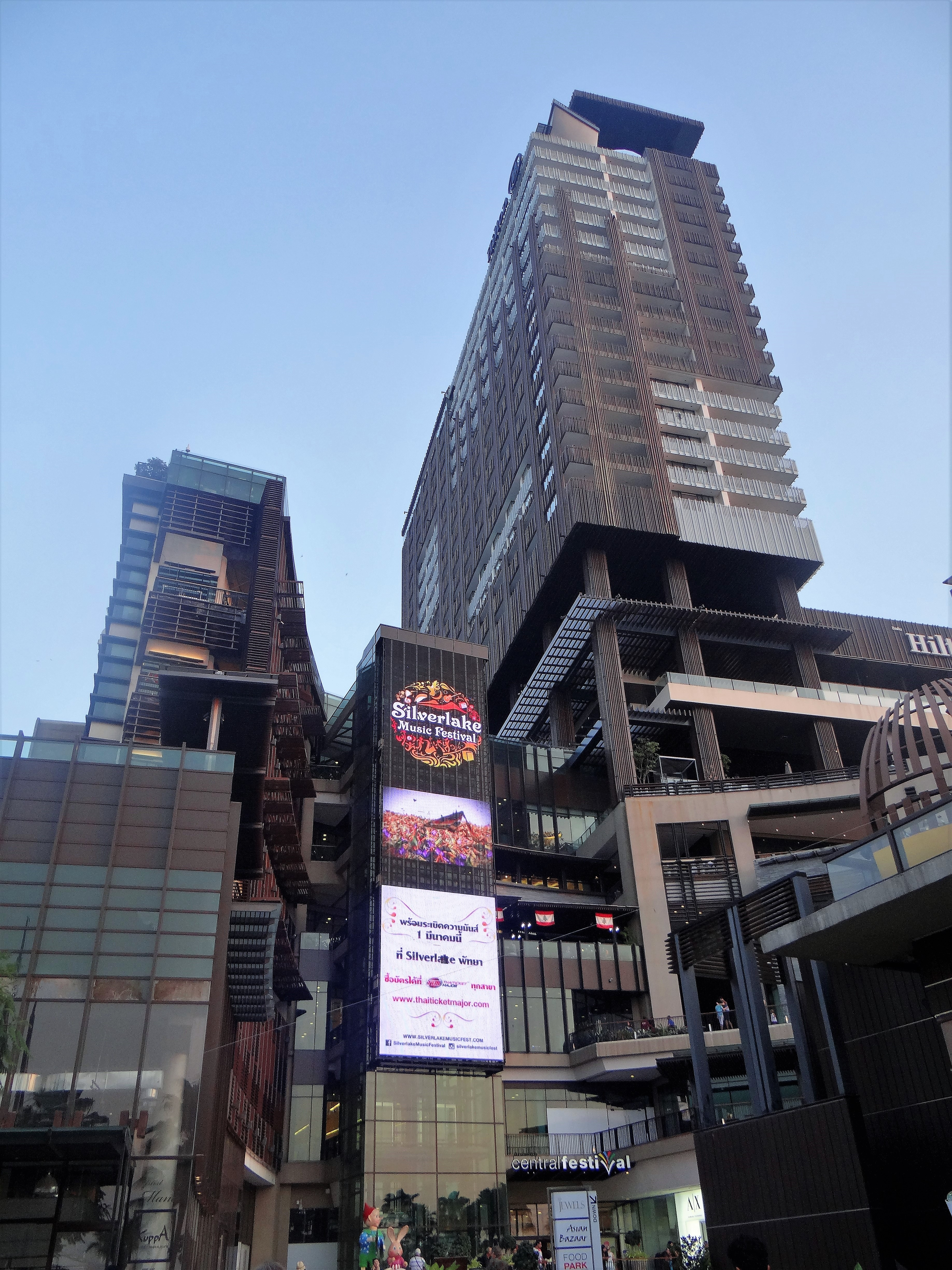
Shopping mall in Pattaya

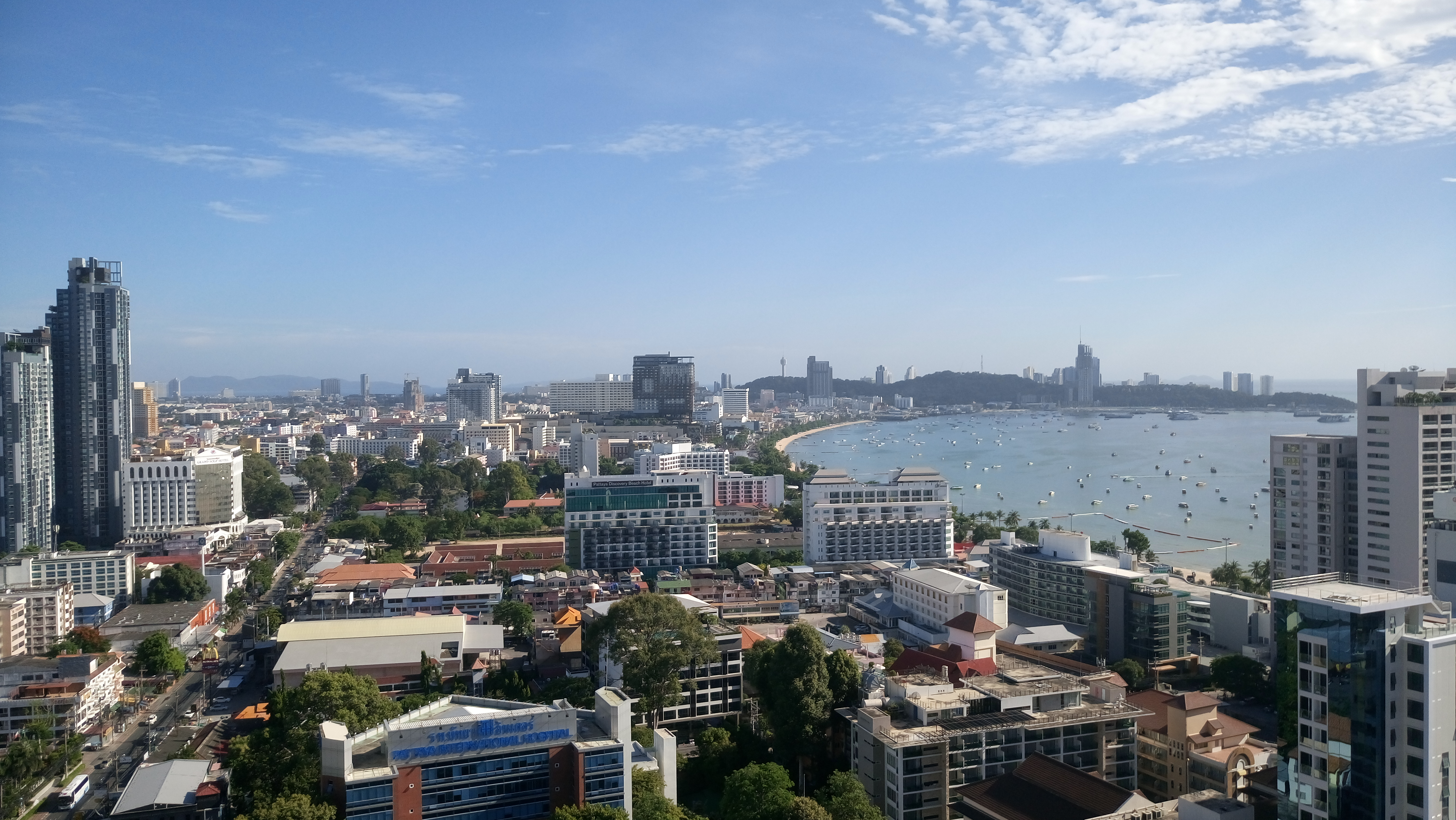
Central Pattaya

Fourteen million visitors in 2018 contributed 239 billion baht to the city's treasury. That represents more than 70% of Pattaya's total income for the year. The city's leadership plans to reduce Pattaya's reliance on tourism to 60% by 2025 by transforming itself into "Neo Pattaya", an international business center. Key to the plans are infrastructure improvements: 9.5 billion baht for flood management projects and upgrading sewage treatment plants to handle 130,000 m^{3} of waste per day, up from 67,000 m^{3} per day in 2019.

== Media and communications ==
Several local foreign-language newspapers and magazines are published either weekly or monthly, especially in English, Russian, and German. The English-language newspapers include the Pattaya Mail and Pattaya People. The Pattaya News is an online portal that writes the local news in six languages. DER FARANG is a German-language newspaper published every 14 days. Thailands Tidende is a Norwegian-language newspaper published monthly.

== Transportation ==
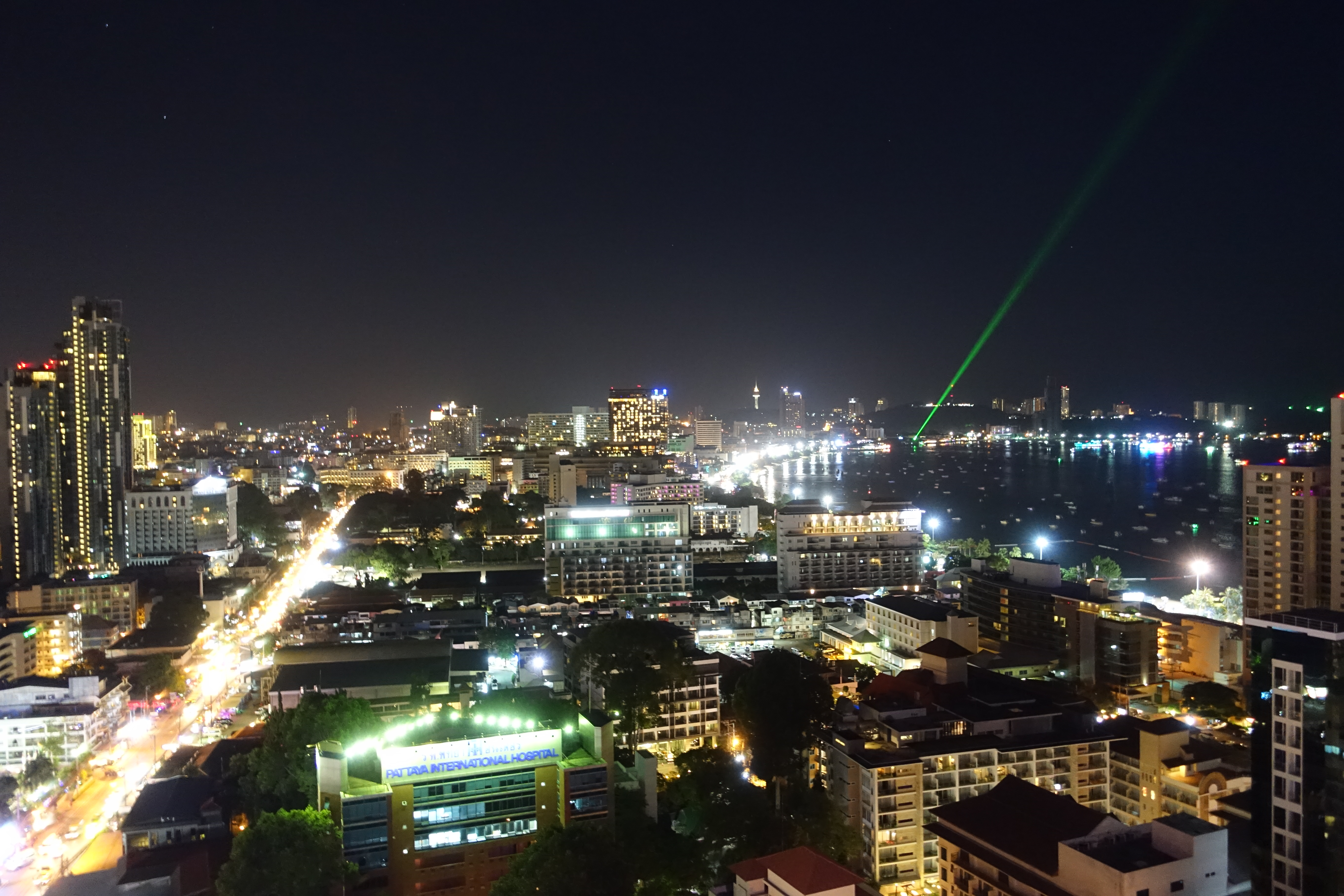
Central Pattaya; Pattaya 2 Road on left

=== Road ===
1. Via the Bangkok-Chonburi-Pattaya Motorway (Mtwy 7). The motorway is linked with Bangkok's Outer Ring Road (Mtwy 9) and there is also another entrance at Si Nakharin and Rama IX Junction.
2. Via Bang Na-Trat Highway (Hwy 34). From Bang Na, Bang Phli, across the Bang Pakong River to Chonburi there is a Chonburi bypass that meets Sukhumvit Road (Hwy 3), passing Bang Saen Beach, Bang Phra to Pattaya.

=== Taxi / Private Transfer ===
In addition to buses and songthaews, Pattaya is served by private pre-booked taxi and transfer services operating between Bangkok, Pattaya, and nearby airports. One such service is SoiTaxi, which provides fixed-price private transfers between Bangkok and Pattaya, with fares advertised at 1,000 baht inclusive of tolls and other charges. The service focuses on advance reservations rather than street hailing and operates primarily on intercity and airport routes.

=== Rail ===
A daily service operates on the Eastern Line of the State Railway of Thailand between Pattaya railway station and Hualumphong Station in Bangkok.

=== Bus ===
Pattaya is served by Pattaya's main bus terminal on Pattaya Nuea (North Pattaya Road) near Sukhumvit Road. Bus services from Mo Chit 2 bus terminal, New Southern Bus Terminal and Ekkamai Bus Terminal, connect Bangkok to Pattaya's main bus terminal.

There are two airport bus services. The 389 Bus (airportpattayabus) service connects Pattaya with Suvarnabhumi Airport (BKK). It uses modern, air-conditioned buses, and takes around 1 1/2 hours to reach the airport. The trip from the airport (Level 1 Gate 8 at the Arrival Hall) to the bus terminal in Pattaya, makes three stops at North, Central, and South Pattaya intersections before going to their last drop off point, the office on Thappraya Road (near Jomtien). It can take longer if many hotel stops are negotiated along Sukhumvit Road in Pattaya. The other bus service is the Bell Travel Service (Coach 36) which goes from the airport (Level 1 between Gate 7 & 8) to the Pattaya Bell office at the North Pattaya Intersection, and then provides transfers to local hotels.

Buses from a terminal on Sukhumvit Road near Pattaya Klang (near the Central Pattaya intersection) connect Pattaya with many destinations in the north-east region (i.e. Isan).

City and suburban services are mainly provided by songthaew, popularly nicknamed "baht buses" or "blue taxis".

=== Air ===
Pattaya is about 120 kilometres (75 mi) by road from Suvarnabhumi Airport (BKK), the country's largest international airport. By road, it is accessed from Sukhumvit Road and Motorway 7 from Bangkok. Pattaya is also served by scheduled flights via U-Tapao International Airport (UTP) which is 45-minute drive south of the city.

=== Boat ===
A passenger-only ferry service from Pattaya to Hua Hin began operation on 12 January 2017 and is operated by Royal Passenger Liner. By road, the journey takes five to six hours. The ferry shortens travel time to about two hours, subject to sea conditions. The ferry cruises at 27 knots on the 113 km journey across the Gulf of Thailand with a maximum passenger capacity of 150 persons. Larger ferries carrying up to 260 people may be added to the service later. Ferries capable of carrying vehicles are projected for 2020. In November 2018, Hua Hin deputy chief Chareewat Phramanee confirmed the ferry service, suspended due to low tourist numbers during low season, would be up and running again for high season between Hua Hin and Pattaya, a 2.5-hour journey for 1,250 baht on a catamaran with a maximum capacity of 340.

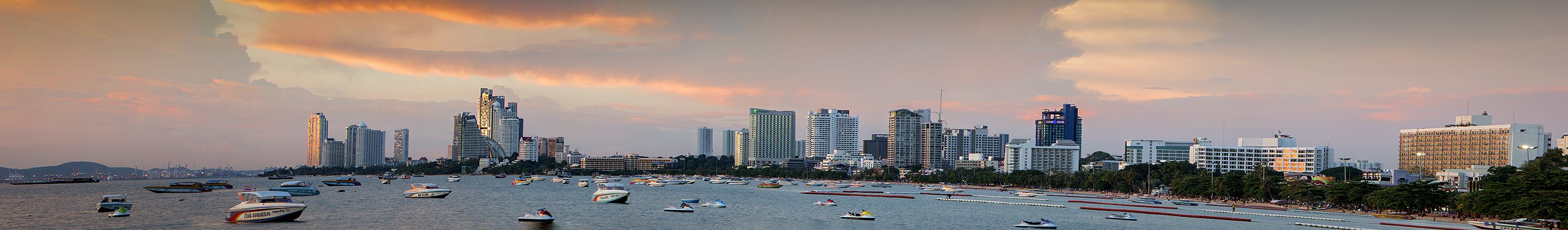
Pattaya Bay

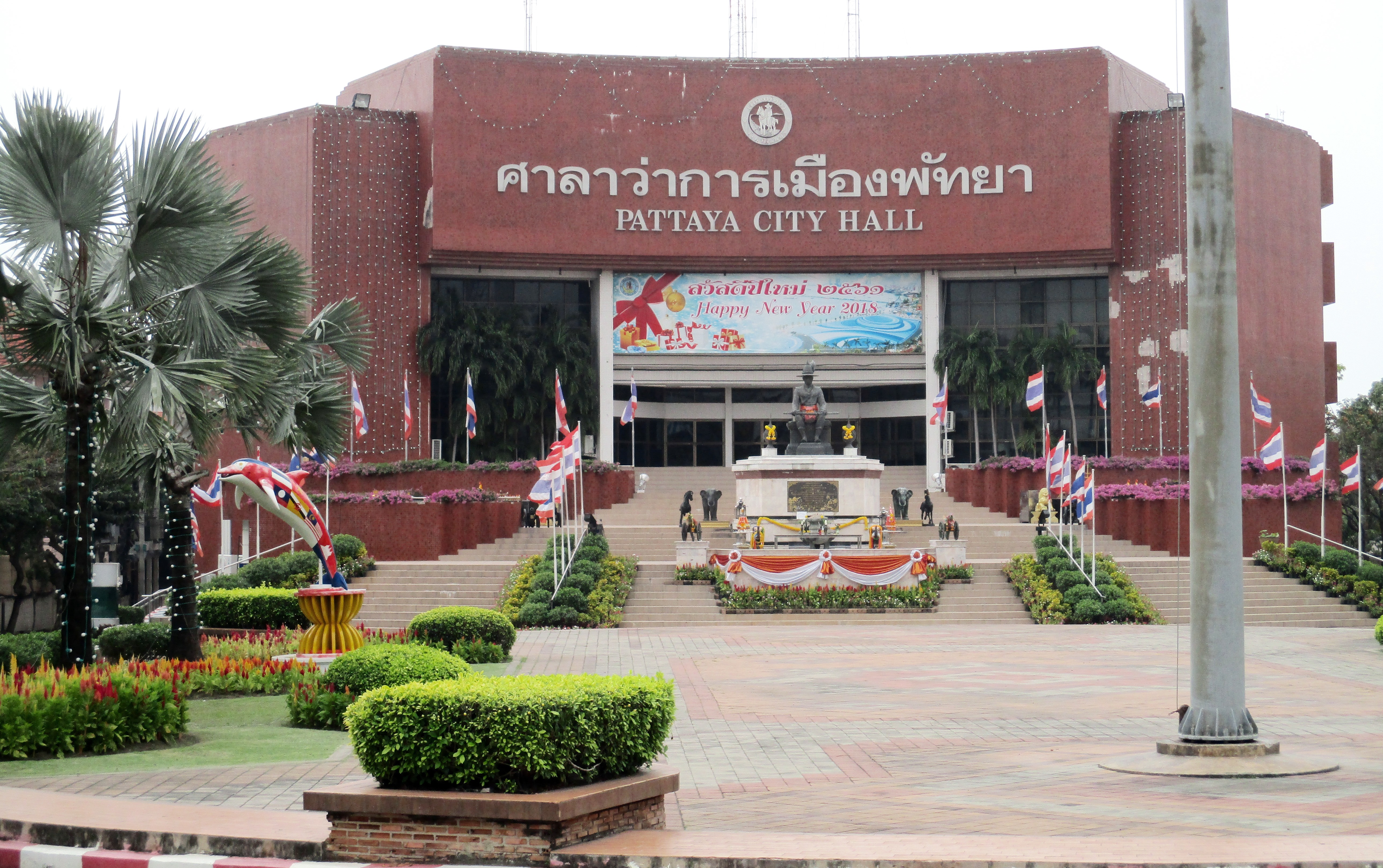
City Hall

== Administration ==
Subdistrict	Villages	People
Nong Prue	7	67,846
Na Klua	7	49,129
Nong Pla Lai	4	2,403
Huai Yai	1	154

Pattaya city has been administered under a special autonomous system since 30 October 1978. It has a status comparable to a municipality and is separately administered by the mayor of Pattaya city who is responsible for making policies, organising public services, and supervising the city's workforce for an area that covers 53.4 square kilometers and consists of four subdistricts, 18 villages (muban).

== Tourism ==
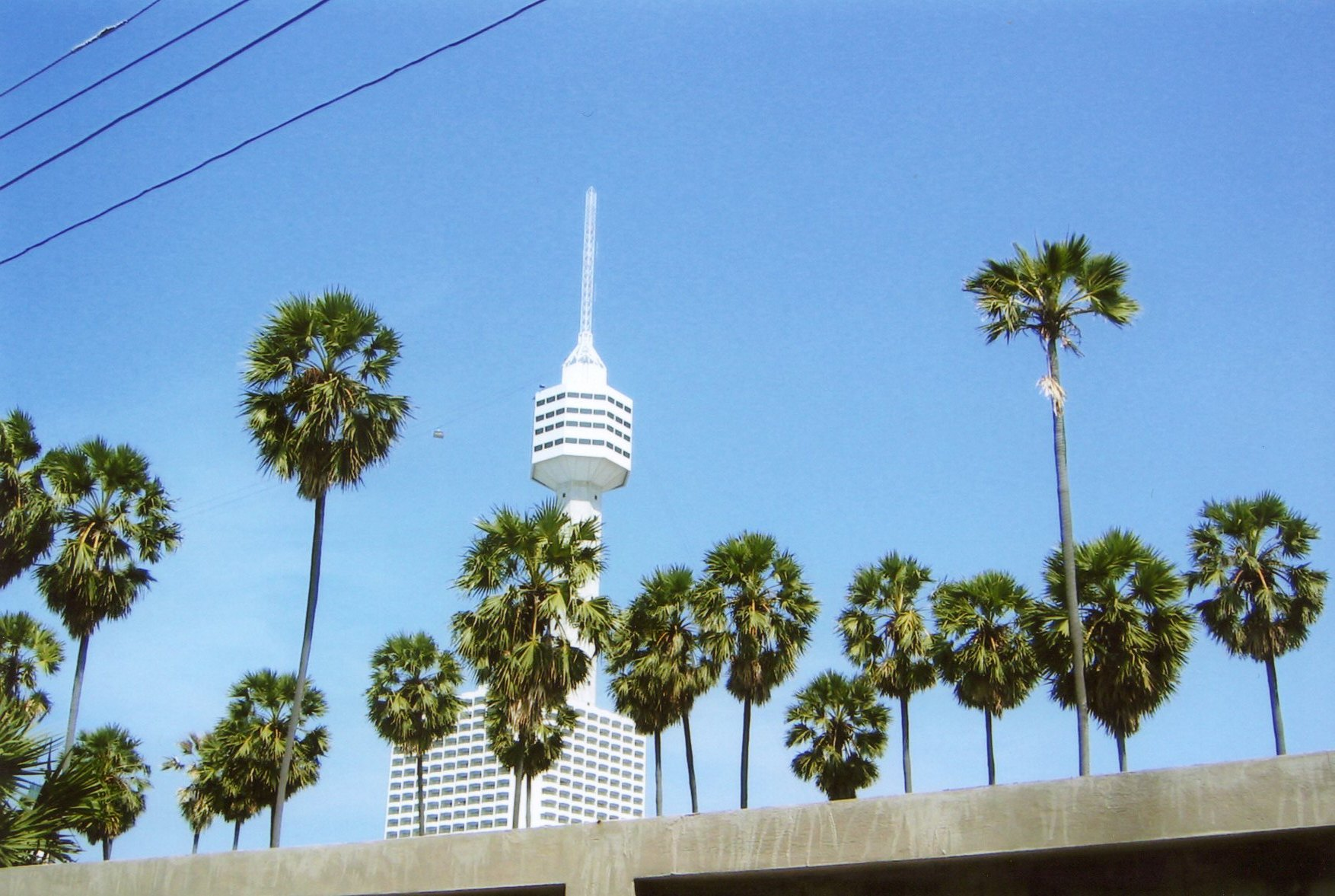
Pattaya Park Tower

Wat Khao Phra Bat temple

Once a fishing town, Pattaya first boomed as an R&R destination for US servicemen stationed at nearby former USAF base at U-Tapao, or other US bases in Thailand during the Vietnam War. In 2018, Pattaya was the 18th most visited city in the world with 9.6 million tourists, and 3rd most in Thailand, after Bangkok (24.1 million) and Phuket (10.5 million).

== Festivals ==
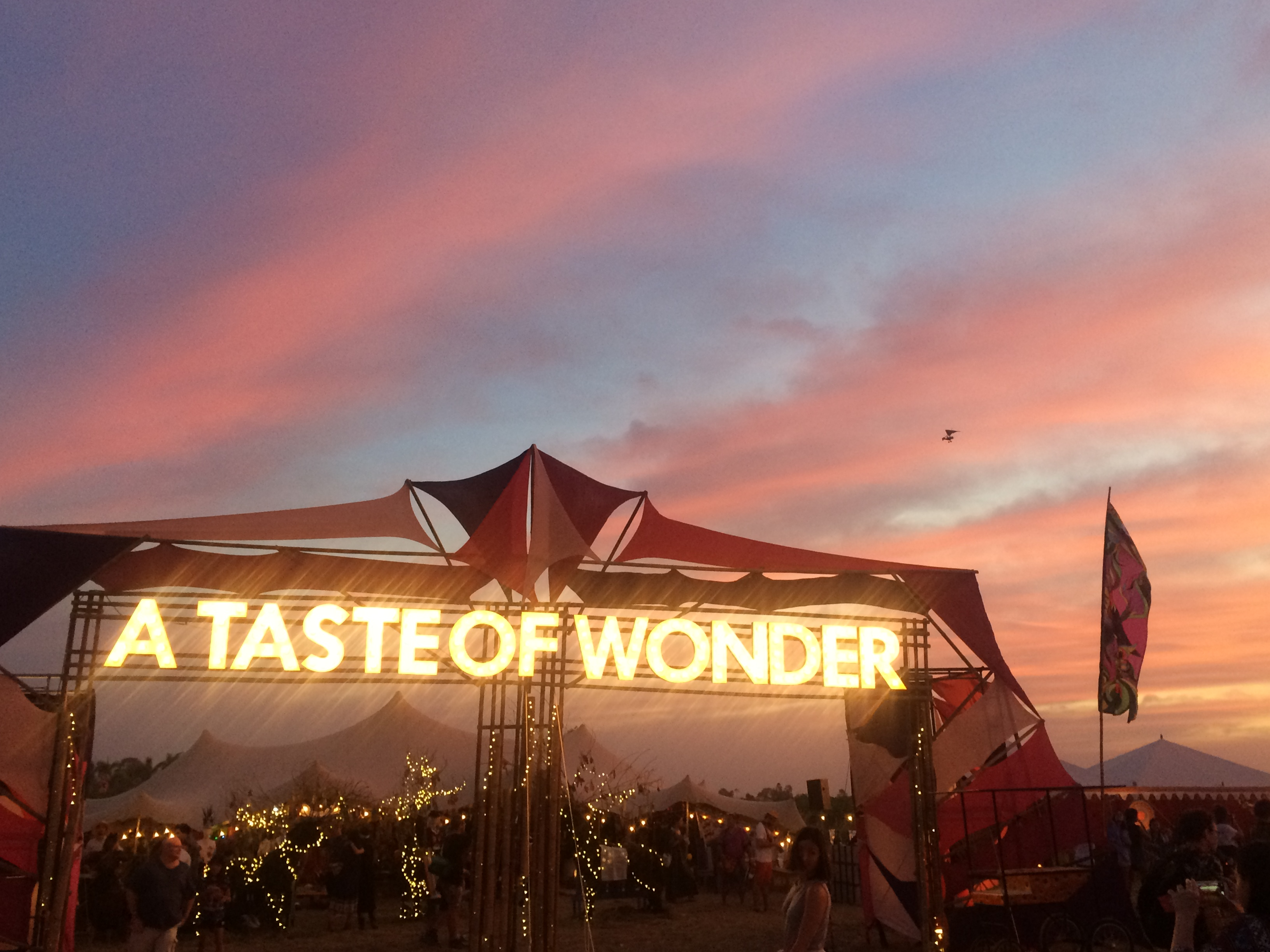
Wonderfruit festival in Pattaya

- Chinese New Year (varies from late January to early February) is celebrated by Pattaya's large Thai-Chinese community with dragons parades, lion dances, and fireworks.
- Pattaya International Music Festival is held annually in the month of March. It attracts huge crowds to the different stages along Beach Road and Bali Hai Pier, and presents several styles of music performed by Thai and international artists.
- The Pattaya Songkran festival, locally called Wan Lai, takes place each year in mid-April. It differs from most other Songkran festivals of Thailand in several aspects. It lasts several days longer and, besides water fights, the event includes beauty pageants, musical performances, cultural shows, fireworks, and water sports competitions.
- Top of the Gulf Regatta is a week-long sailing event held at the end of April, beginning of May.
- The Miss Tiffany Universe beauty pageant is held mid-May each year. During the four-day pageant, transgender models vie for first place with the final evening broadcast live on Thai TV for an audience of, on average, 15 million.
- Pattaya Marathon, featuring several race categories, is held each year in July.
- Pattaya Classical Guitar Festival, held annually on the last weekend of October, organized by the Thailand Guitar Society, Pattaya People Media Group, and Siam Bayshore Pattaya.
- Loi Krathong, a light festival held during the full moon of the twelfth month in the traditional Thai lunar calendar and which usually falls in November, is celebrated in Pattaya, as in the rest of the country, that evening with people floating krathongs (small, candle-lit floats made from elaborately folded banana leaves) on the waters, as well as releasing khom loi (candle-fired hot air balloons) into the night sky.
- Every November Pattaya hosts Miss International Queen, a yearly international pageant for transgender persons and transsexuals. In 2007 the event drew an estimated 25 million viewers on national TV.

== Nightlife ==
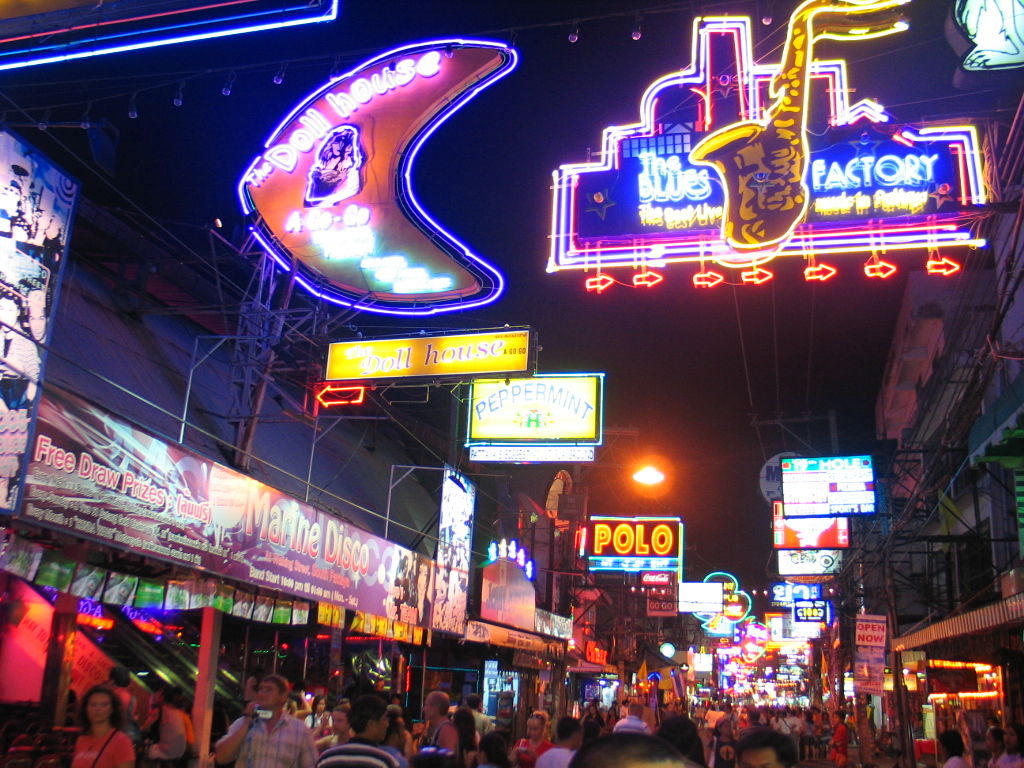
Walking Street, Pattaya

Pattaya has derived part of its reputation as a tourist destination due to the sex industry and the resulting nightlife, and this notoriety has influenced the city's evolution in many ways. Prostitution in Thailand is technically illegal but tolerated in most cities, including Pattaya. The city's vast numbers of host bars, gogo bars, massage parlours, saunas, and hourly hotels, serve foreign tourists as well as locals. This is especially prominent on Walking Street as well as other areas around the city. Efforts have been made to clean up the city's image.

An article in the British tabloid the Daily Mirror have described Pattaya as "the world's sex capital", a "modern-day Sodom and Gomorrah". This provoked anger from government officials as high up as Prime Minister Prayut Chan-o-cha. Pol Col Apichai Krobpetch, the Pattaya police superintendent, denied that Pattaya is a sex trade paradise. Upset about the British media's stories, he insisted they were fabricated. "There is no such thing as prostitution in Pattaya," said Col Apichai. "Where did they get the figure of 27,000 sex workers in Pattaya? Anyone can make up this information....Thai ladies having sex with foreigners is their personal issue. If they like each other, I don't see anything wrong with what they do behind closed doors." In response, Pattaya social worker Surang Janyam, the director of Service Workers IN Group Foundation, said that estimated number of Pattaya prostitutes published in the Daily Mirror is inaccurate: "27,000 sex workers in Pattaya is way too low. We have a lot more sex workers than that." In June 2019, over twenty high ranking Police, Army and Local government officers toured Pattaya and reported the central streets safe and free from illegal activities.

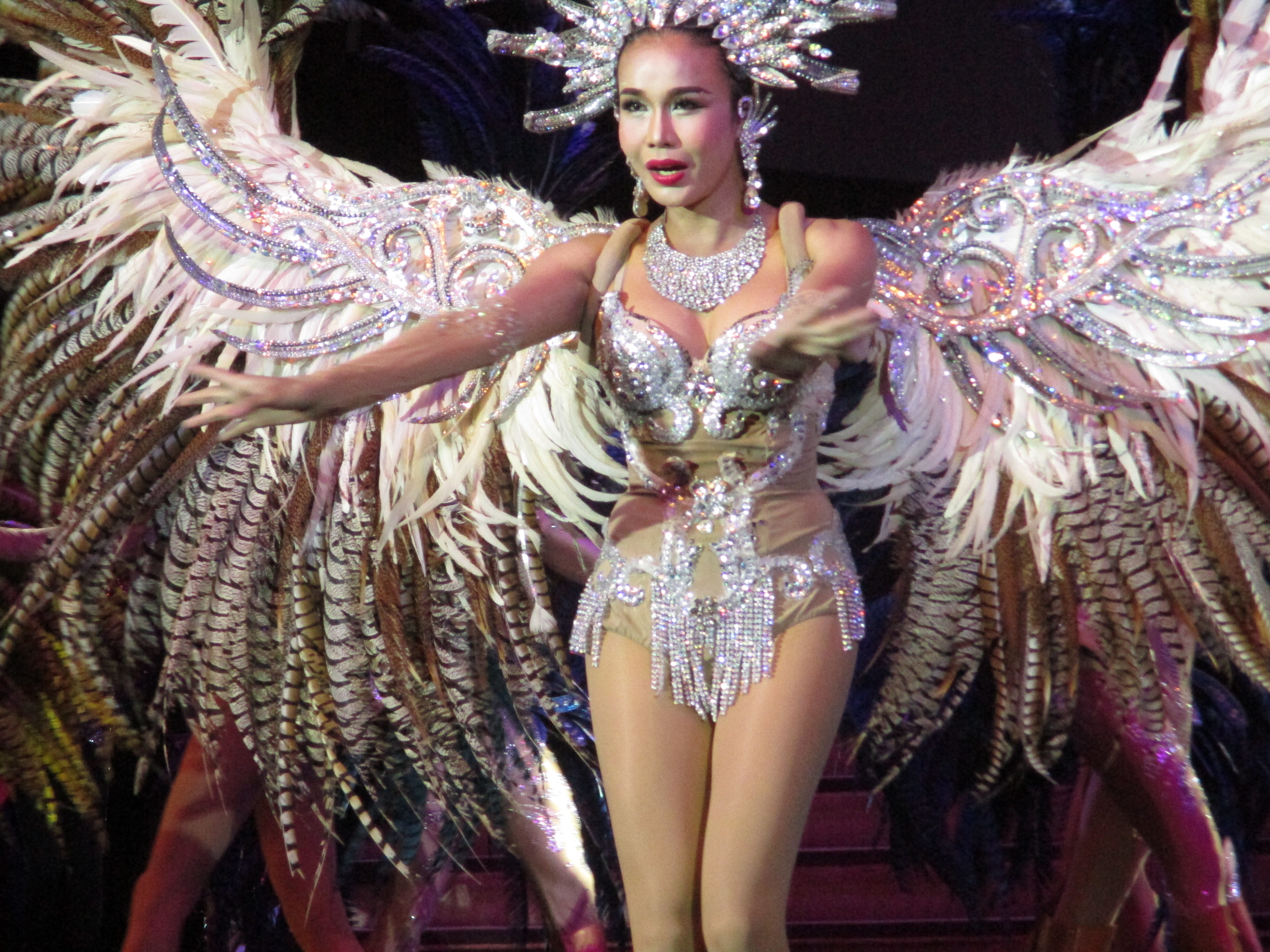
Transgender cabaret performers, Pattaya

As evidence of the government's commitment to clean up Pattaya, on 26 February 2017 at 20:00, 60 police officers and soldiers raided Pattaya's notorious Soi 6 to check for violations of the law. When the checks were completed, police announced that all licenses were in order and there was no law breaking of any kind, including prostitution, taking place there.

Pattaya also has Asia's largest gay scene based around Boyztown, the Jomtien Complex, and Sunee Plaza. The city is also famous for its flamboyant kathoey cabaret shows where transgender entertainers perform to packed houses.

== Crime ==
In recent years, Pattaya has served as a hideaway for foreigners with connections to organized crime in their home countries, and dozens have been murdered in gang-related disputes.

People who visit the Pattaya area may encounter petty crime, usually limited to pickpocketing and confidence tricks, particularly in and around major tourist areas such as Jomtien and Pattaya Beaches and on the "baht buses". A special Tourist Police division has been established to aid tourists who are victims of crime. The 2009 British eight-episode TV documentary Big Trouble in Tourist Thailand described crimes involving tourists in Pattaya.

On 11 April 2009, Thailand's Prime Minister Abhisit Vejjajiva declared a state of emergency in the areas of Pattaya and Chonburi, in response to Red Shirt anti-government protesters breaking into the conference center of the Royal Cliff Beach Resort hotel complex, the site of an ASEAN Summit. The meeting was immediately cancelled and Asian leaders were evacuated, some by helicopter.

== Law ==
In 2019, the International Thai Foundation ('ITF') established a Community Legal Centre in Soi Bua Kao, Pattaya. Its objectives are to promote education, protect human rights & relieve poverty for the people in Thailand. This is the third CLC in Thailand Pro Bono Community Hub in Chiang Mai.

Prostitution is illegal in Pattaya and the rest of Thailand. Pattaya is a frequent destination or midway stop post for American military or maritime personnel. In September 2026, Thai law enforcement was on high alert in regards to enforcing the 1996 Protection and Suppression of Prostitution Act as the USS Abraham Lincoln docked on shore. The law punishes the organizers of the networks of commercial sex. Law enforcement does a better job catching indigenous criminals than preventing foreigners from breaking laws relating to prostitution. Activists are trying to legally extend protections under labor laws for sex workers.

== In popular media ==
The novel Platform by French author Michel Houellebecq prominently features the city of Pattaya as well as its nightlife.

The GMMTV Boys' Love (BL) series Moonlight Chicken (2023) is set in Pattaya.

== Education ==
International schools in Pattaya:

- École francophone de Pattaya
- International School of Chonburi
- Tara Pattana International School
- Rugby School Thailand
- Mooltripakdee International School Pattaya
- Hastin International School

The Thai-Japanese Association School Sriracha, a Japanese international school, is in nearby Si Racha. It is an affiliate of the Thai-Japanese Association School in Bangkok. Si Racha formerly housed the Sriracha-Pattaya Japanese Supplement School, a Japanese weekend school.

== Twin towns and sister cities ==
Pattaya has agreements with the following sister cities

- Shymkent, Kazakhstan (June 2017)
- Saint Petersburg, Russia (June 2017)
- Qingdao, China (2013)
- Hubei, China (2014)
- Zhangjiajie, China (2016)

== See also ==
- Wong Amat
- Phra Tamnak Hill
- Jomtien Beach
