= Wong Amat Beach =

Beach in Thailand

Wong Amat Beach หาดวงศ์อมาตย์ (Thai)
- Beach
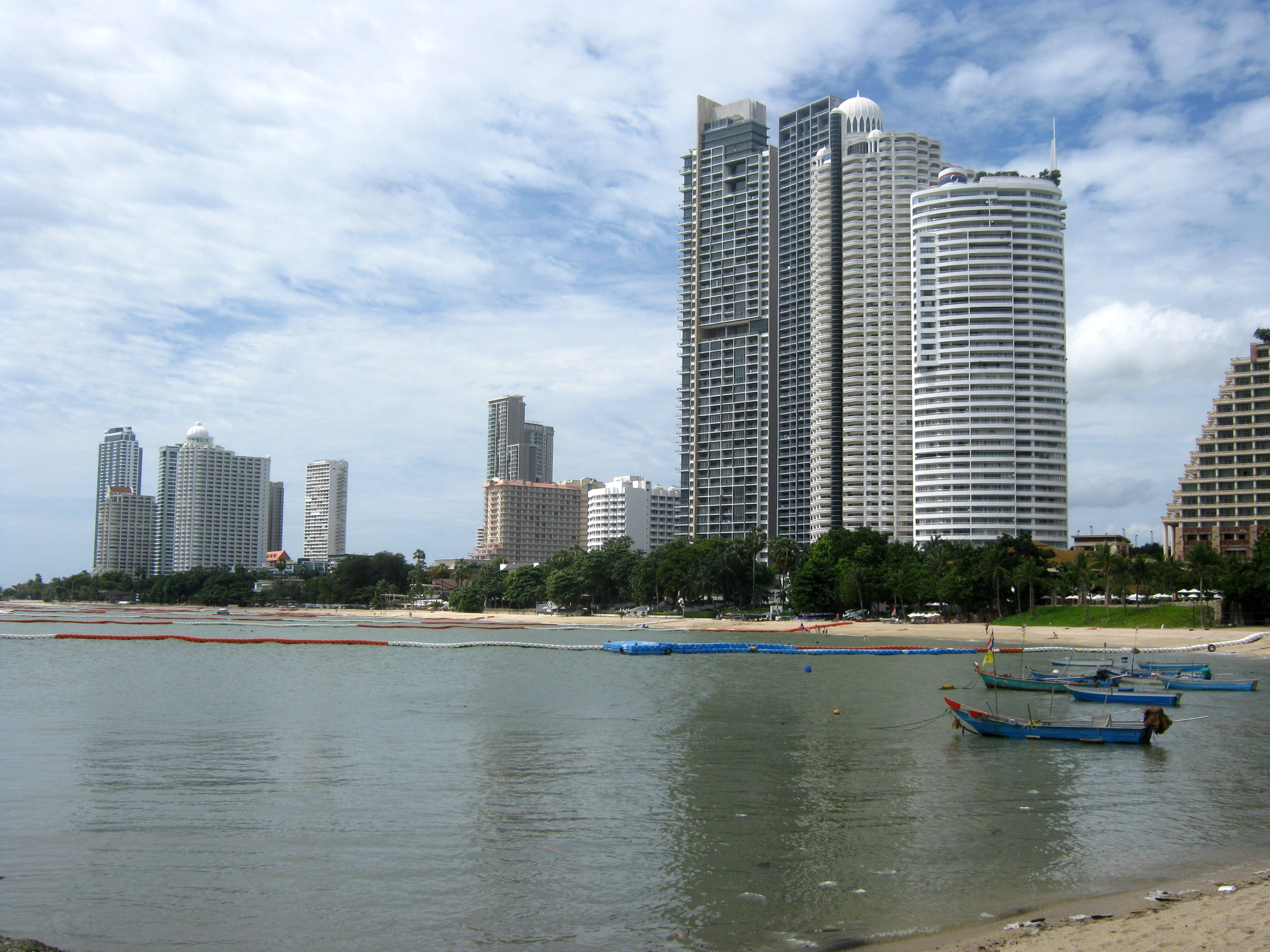
- Hotels and condominiums on Wong Amat Beach

- Location within Chonburi province Location within Thailand
- Coordinates: 12°57′36″N 100°53′05″E
- Location: Pattaya, Bang Lamung, Chonburi, Thailand
- Part of: Pattaya
- Water bodies: Gulf of Thailand
- Etymology: Boonwong Amatayakul

Wong Amat Beach (Thai: หาดวงศ์อมาตย์) is a beach in Na Kluea in northern Pattaya on the east coast of the Gulf of Thailand, 165 kilometres (103 mi) from Bangkok in Chonburi Province. The beach is located on the Nakluea Bay peninsula. The beach is 1.3 kilometres (0.81 mi) long. Unlike Pattaya Beach, there is no beach road running along it.

In the 2010s, the neighbourhood saw heavy property development with many luxury beachfront condominium towers, and is now one of the most expensive neighbourhoods in Pattaya. The area is also home to several hotels.

== History ==
The first hotel along Wong Amat Beach was built in 1960 and called the Wong Amat Hotel. Both the name of the hotel and modern beach derive their name from the hotel's original owner, Boonwong Amatayakul. In 1988, the hotel was sold to Central Group. It was subsequently renamed Central Wongamat Beach Resort Pattaya, and renovated into Centara Grand Mirage Beach Resort Pattaya.

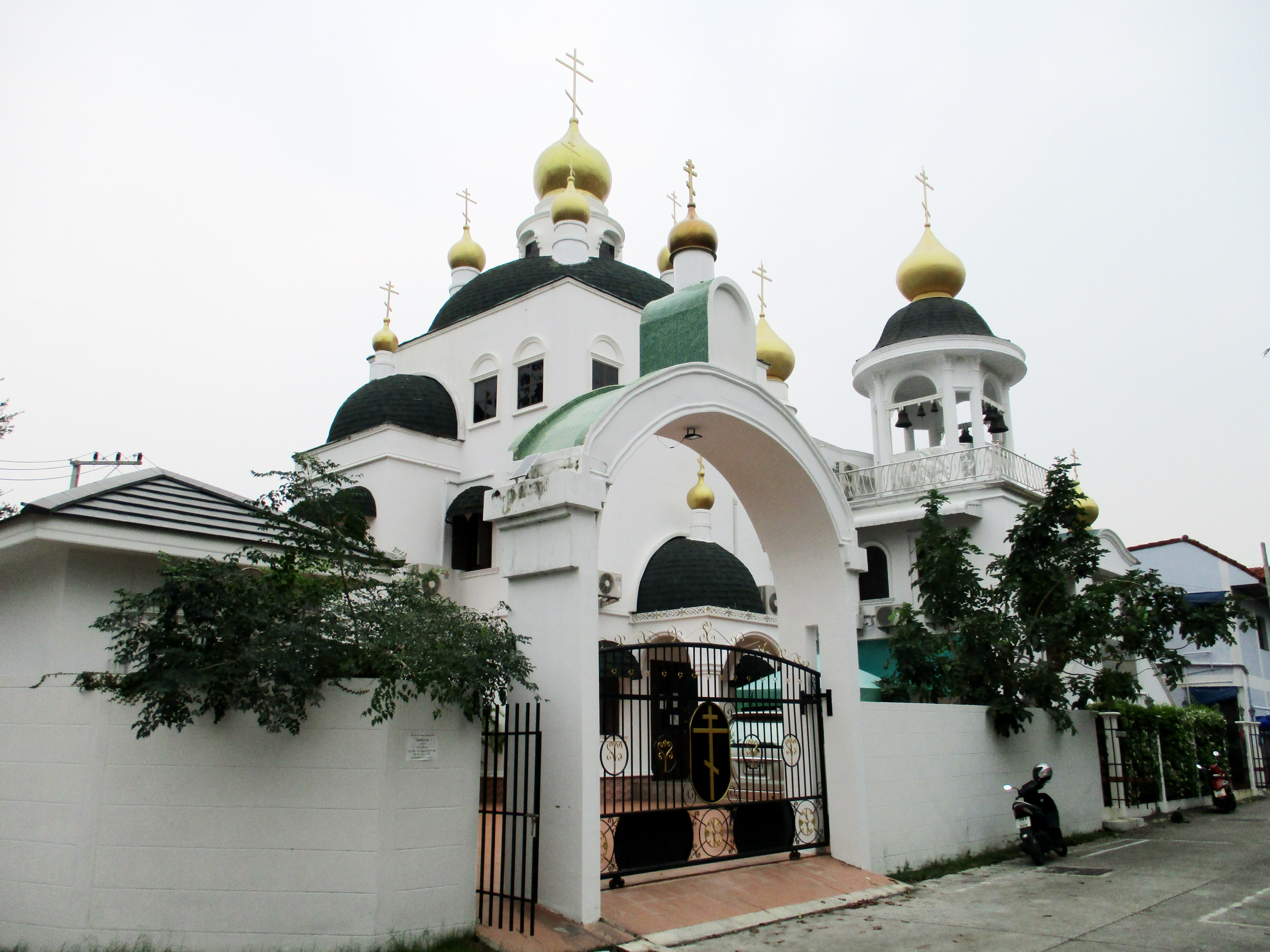
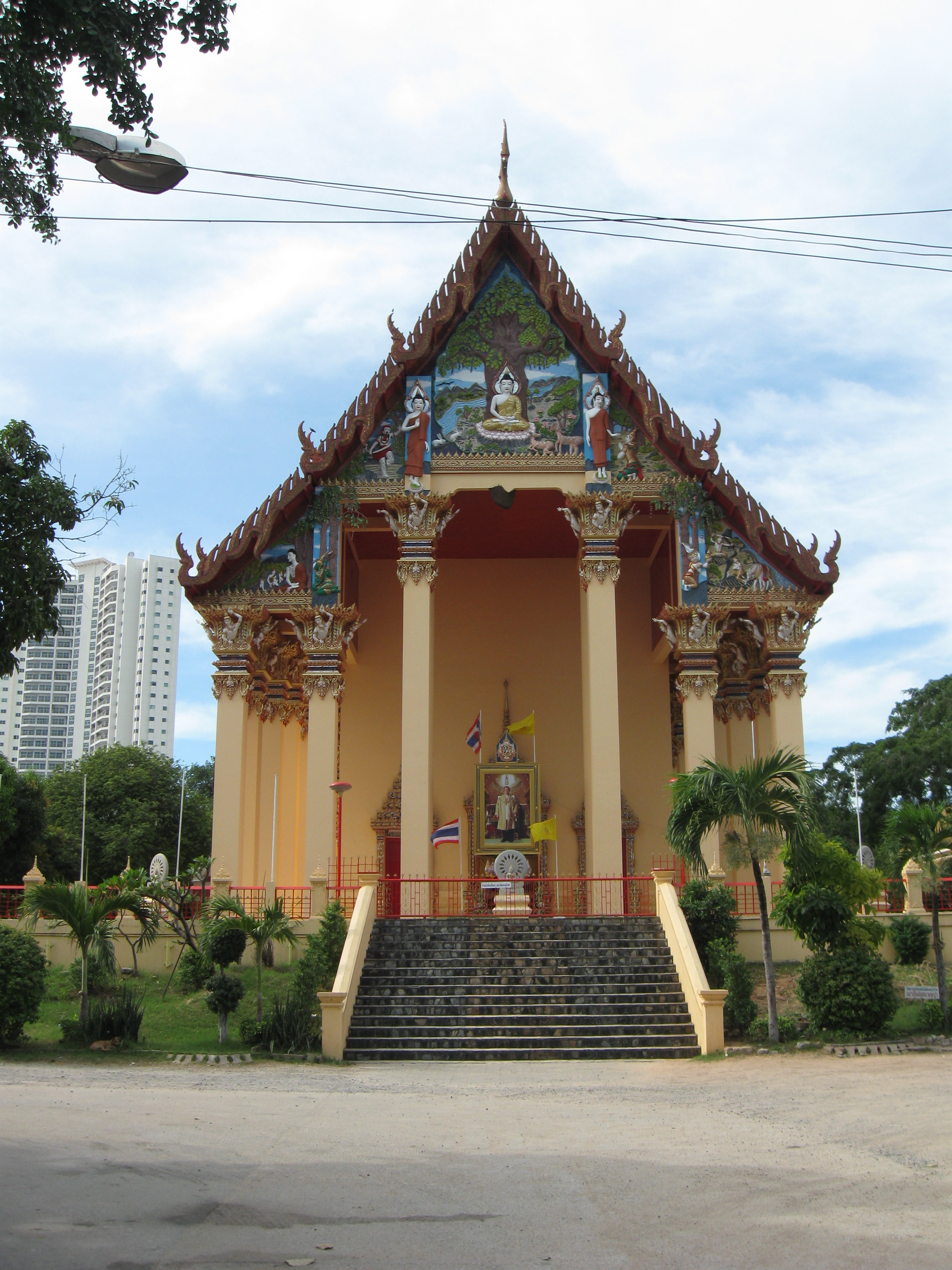
All Saints Orthodox Church, 2018 (left); Wat Phothisamphan, 2013 (right)

Wong Amat also contains a few religious sites. In 2008, the All Saints Orthodox Church of Pattaya was constructed. It is part of the Eastern Orthodox Church in Thailand. Wat Photisamphan, a Buddhist temple, is also located on the eastern parts of Wong Amat. Land for the temple was donated to Buddhist monks in 1955, and in 1957 the temple's foundation stone was laid.
