= Khao Phra Tamnak =

Hill in Thailand

Khao Phra Tamnak เขาพระตำหนัก
- Phra Tamnak Hill
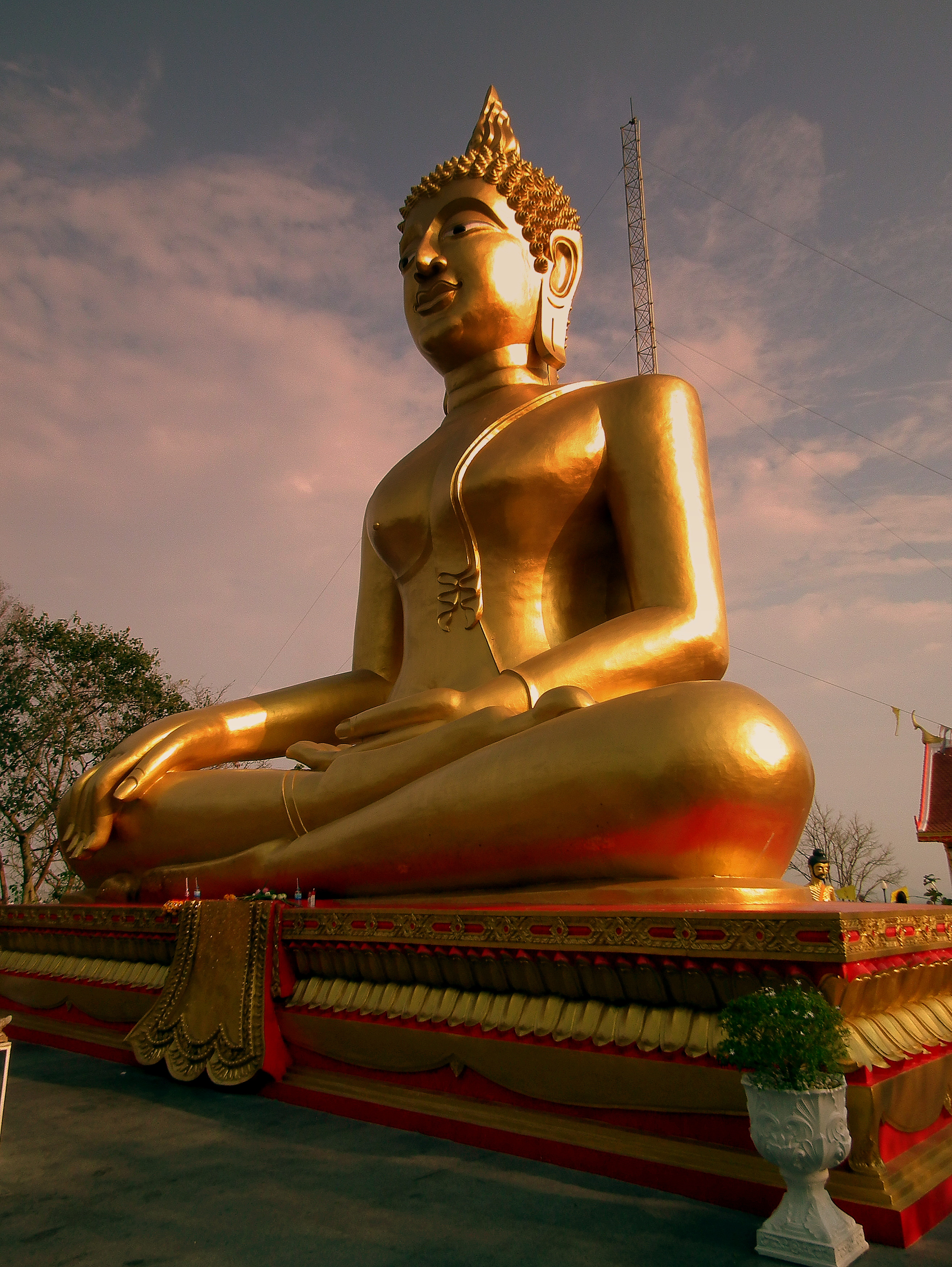
- The Big Buddha statue on Khao Phra Tamnak, 2012

Highest point
- Elevation: 98 m (322 ft)
- Coordinates: 12°55′1″N 100°52′3″E

Naming
- English translation: Palace Hill

Geography
- Location: Pattaya, Chonburi province, Thailand

Khao Phra Tamnak (Thai: เขาพระตำหนัก, lit. 'palace hill',), also called Phra Tamnak Hill, is a hill located in between Pattaya Beach and Jomtien Beach on the south side of Pattaya. The hill is known for its viewpoints in Chaloem Phrakiat Park; the temple Wat Phra Yai, also known as Big Buddha Hill, which is generally known for its large golden Buddha statue; and the Pattaya City sign. It has the highest natural point in Pattaya City, with its highest elevation being 98 meters above sea level.

== Name ==
The hill is generally known as Khao Phra Tamnak or Phra Tamnak Hill, with 'khao' (เขา) meaning hill or mountain. The hill is also known in English sources as 'Pattaya Hill', due to the absence of hills from most of central Pattaya; or as Phrabat mountain.

== Location ==
Phra Tamnak Hill is 170 kilometres (110 mi) southeast of Bangkok in Bang Lamung District, Pattaya, Chonburi Province of Thailand. The location borders numerous beaches, Bali Hai Beach (north), Pattaya Beach (north-northeast), Royal Cliff Beach, Cozy Beach and Pratumnak Beach (west), Sugar Beach (southwest), Dongtan Beach and the Jomtien Beach (South-Southeast) to the Gulf of Thailand.

The hill is also located near the end of Walking Street, and behind the Bali Hai pier.

The hill can be accessed by foot, car or taxi.

== Attractions ==
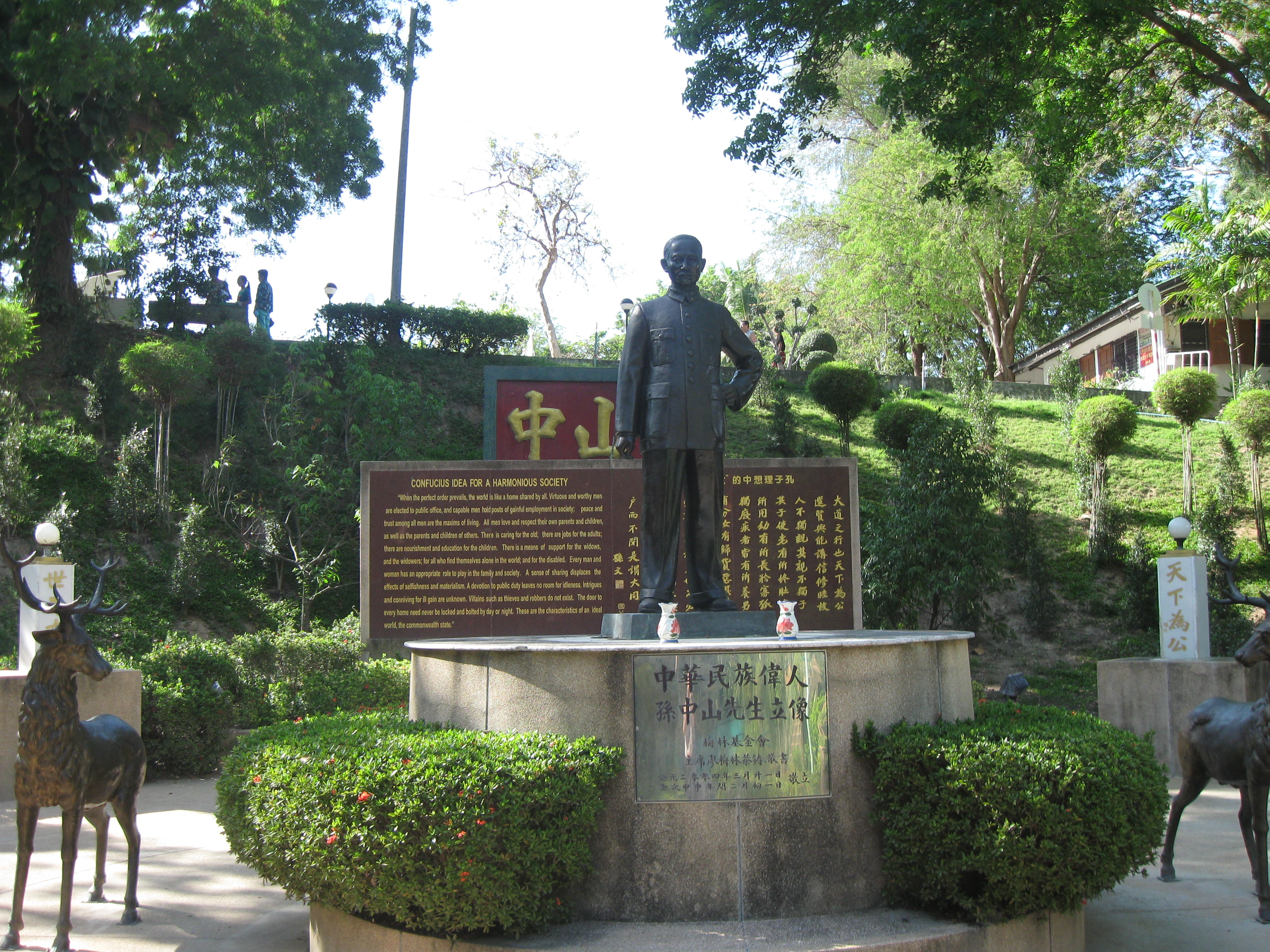
Monument of Dr. Sun Yat-sen Chinese: 孫中山 / 孫逸仙 / 孫文 in the park at Taoist temple Wang Sam Sien, Phra Tamnak Hill

Phra Tamnak Hill or Pratumnak Hill is a spot for fitness and beach leisure. Under the patronage of His Royal Majesty Bhumibol Adulyadej, it has an impact on the development and rise of sailing, yacht racing, and sea sports.

Pattaya Park and Pattaya Tower are on the south end of Phra Tamnak Hill and the Pattaya Exhibition and Convention Hall (P.E.A.C.H.) is on the north. From there down the hill is the Bali Hai Pier and the Walking Street, Pattaya.

=== Abhakara Kiartivongse monument ===
At 98 meters above sea level is the Abhakara Kiartivongse monument, a bronze statue dedicated to Abhakara Kiartivongse, who is regarded as the Father of the Royal Thai navy. Due to the construction of the Waterfront Suites and Residence condominium from 2011 to 2014, the statue's view of the Bay of Bangkok has been restricted, causing the building and then mayor Itthiphol Khunpluem to come under criticism. Since its construction halt in 2014, the abandoned building has continued to obstruct most of the statue's view of the sea.

Due to the area being the highest - at 98 metres above sea level - both a radio and TV station were constructed. The radio station is administered by the Royal Thai navy as Sor Tor Ro 5 Station.

=== Wang Sam Sien ===
Wang Sam Sien is a Taoist temple dedicated to Confucius and Guanyin. The shrine is along the way up to Wat Phra Yai. The organization that created Wang Sam Sien, the Mahakitpaisan Foundation, came into conflict with Pattaya City officials, who accuse the foundation of building on public land. The Supreme Administrative Court then ruled in Pattaya City's favour. This eventually resulted in the Mahakitpaisan Foundation releasing the land to the city in March 2021, who will then keep it as a Chinese-Thai cultural center with the Sawangboriboon Foundation. Then mayor, Sontaya Kunplome, then toured the temple on 9 March 2021 to come up with a plan with the Sawangboriboon Foundation to develop the center.

=== Wat Phra Yai ===
Wat Phra Yai is a Buddhist temple known primarily for its golden 18-metre tall 'Big Buddha statue'. The temple dates back to the 1940s when Pattaya was still a fishing town, while the statue was built in 1977. The steps leading up to the statue are bounded by two 7-headed Nagas who are designed to guard the statue. Wat Phra Yai also contains seven other statues of the Buddha in different postures to represent their day of the week.

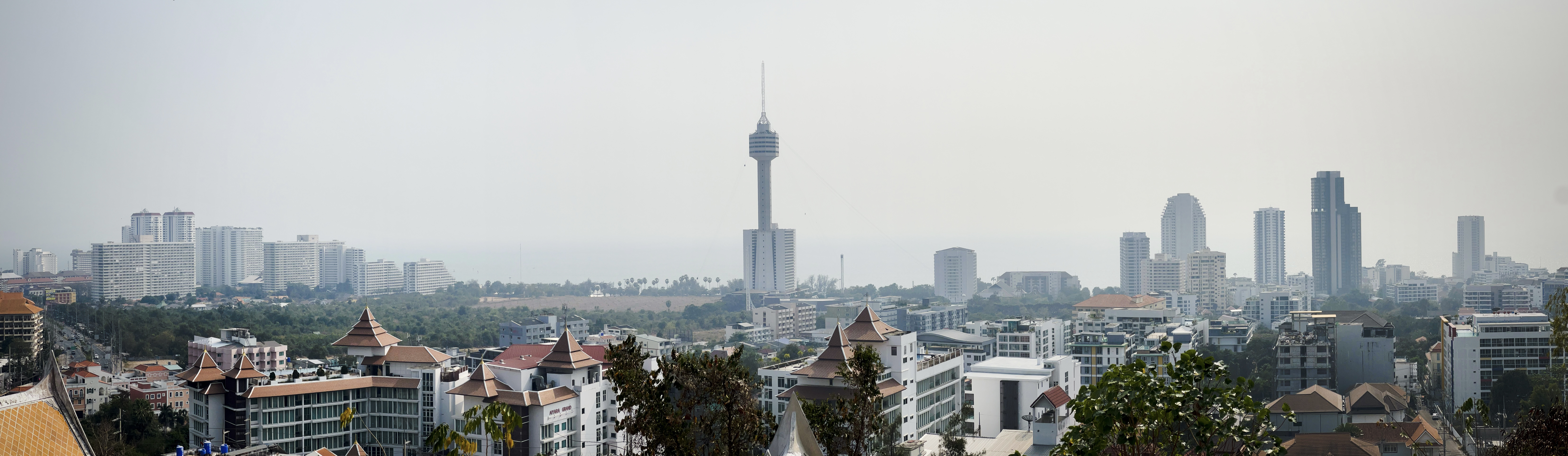
View of Pattaya from the Big Buddha

=== Chaloem Phrakiat park ===
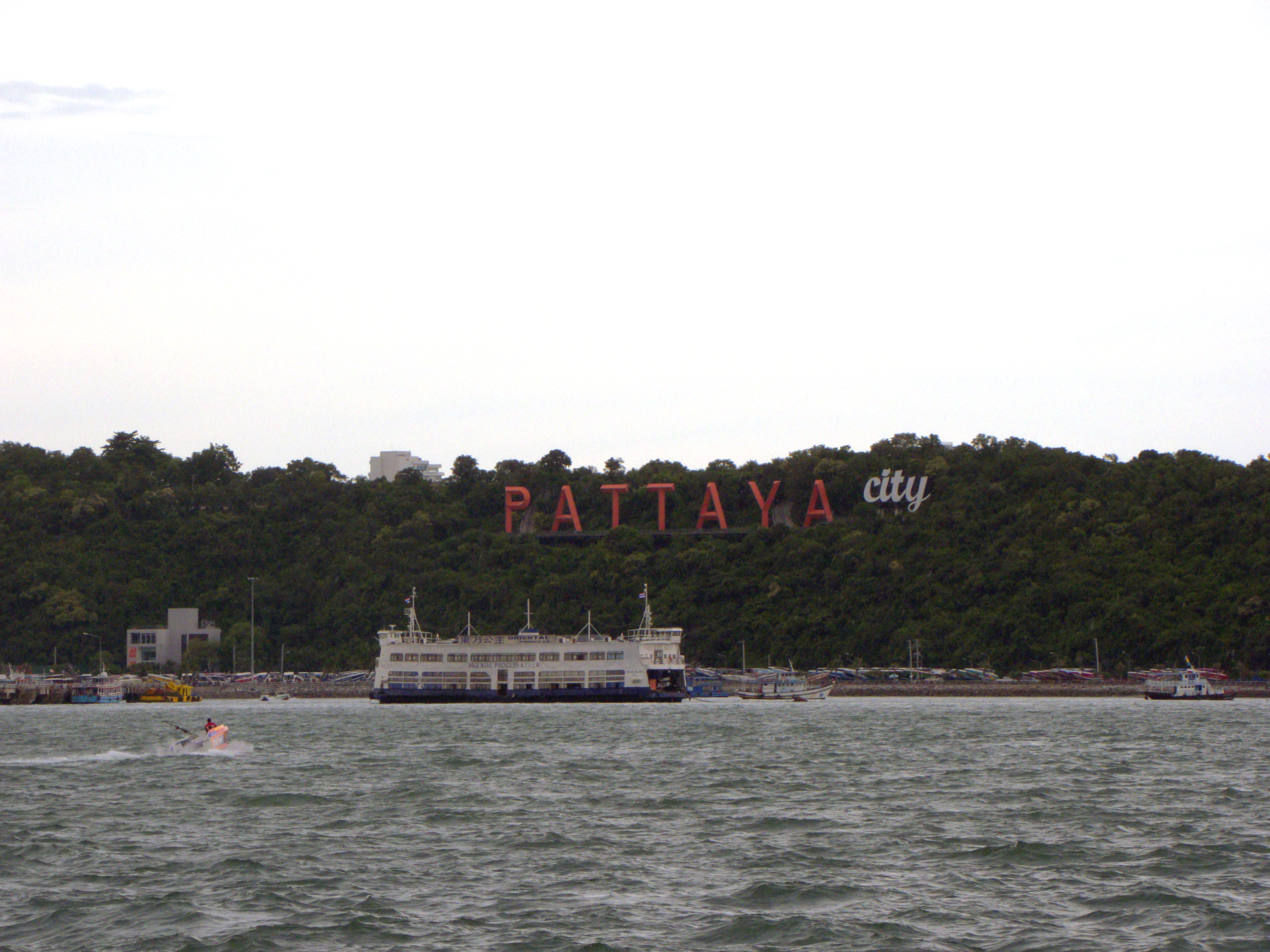
The Pattaya City sign from a distance

Covering around 24,000m², Chaloem Phrakiat park was established during the reign of King Bhumibol.

=== Pattaya City sign ===
The Pattaya City sign is a large sign with the words 'PATTAYA' in red, and 'city' in white located on the hill. The sign also has a view point, which is not promoted by the Tourism Authority of Thailand and as such has no tour buses going to and from it. The view point can be accessed from either Bali Hai pier area or from a nearby road.
