= Jomtien Beach =

Beach in Thailand

Jomtien จอมเทียน (Thai) Hat Dong Tan
- Beach
- Jomtien Beach aerial photo from Soi Three South Pattaya.

- Location within Chonburi Location within Thailand
- Coordinates: 12°53′45″N 100°52′23″E
- Location: Pattaya, Bang Lamung, Chonburi, Thailand
- Water bodies: Gulf of Thailand
- Etymology: Princess Jomtien
- Operator: Pattaya

Dimensions
  - Length: 6 kilometres (3.7 mi)

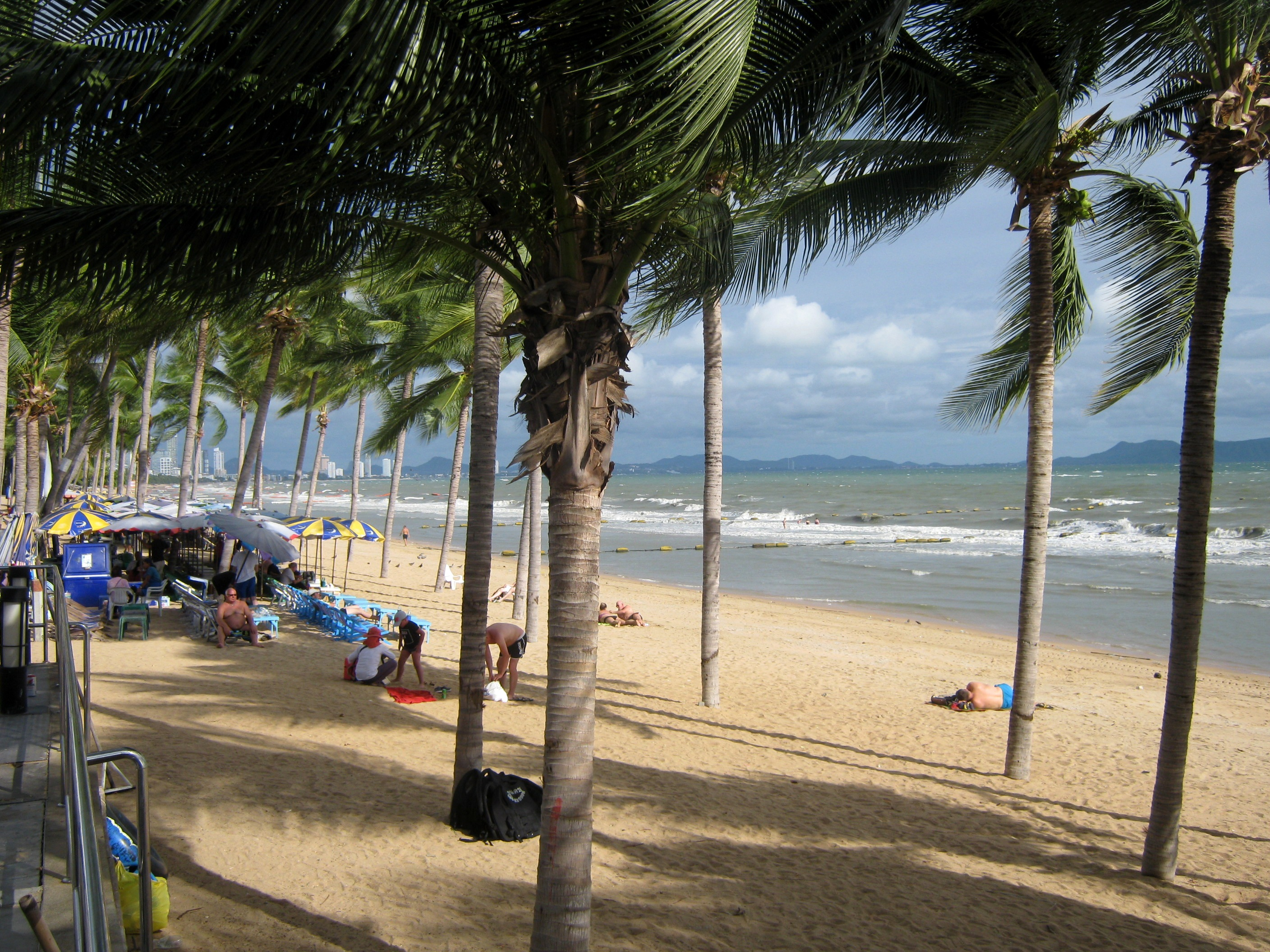
Jomtien Beach

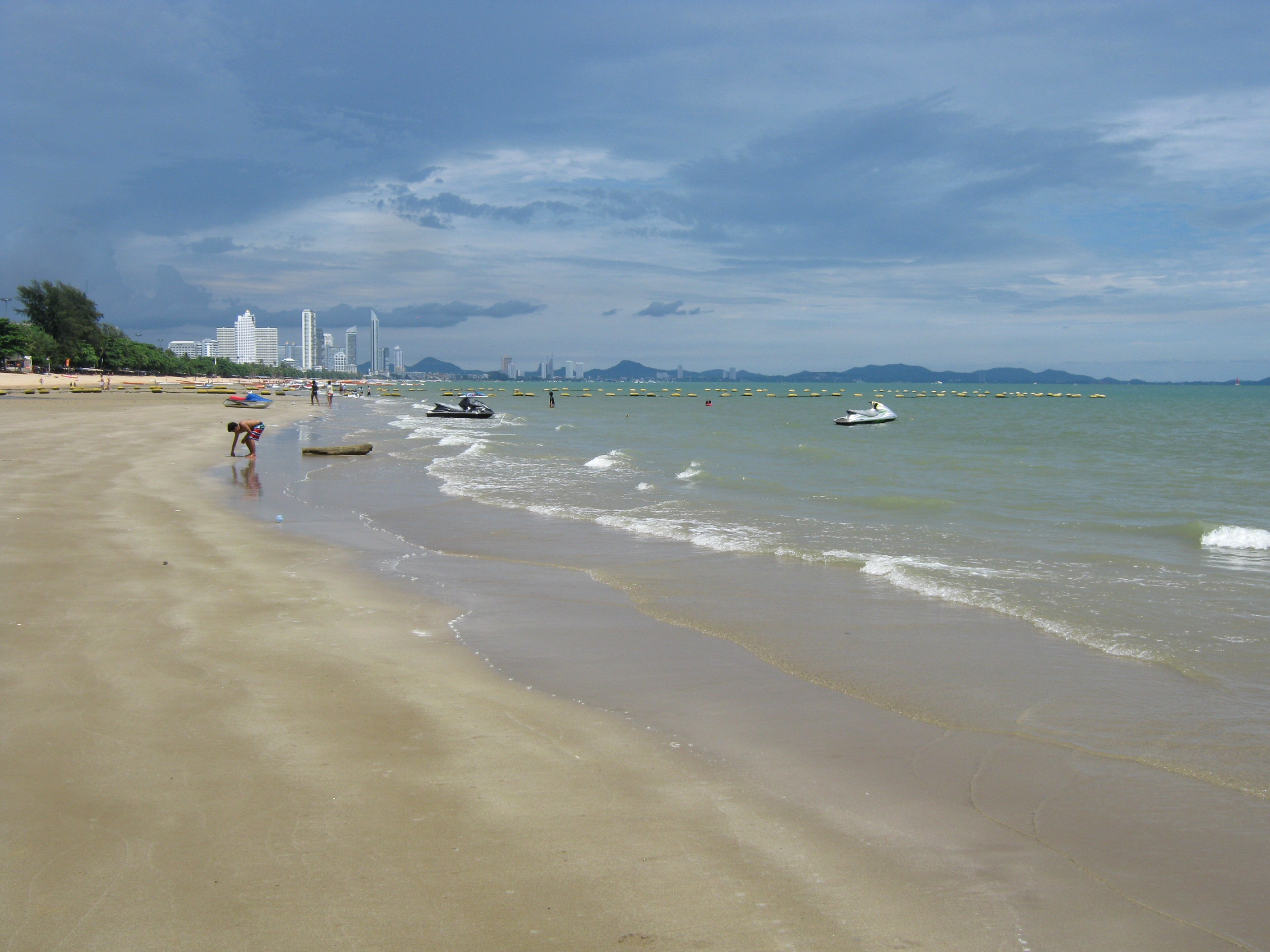
Jomtien Beach

Jomtien (Note: On road signs and road maps it is also spelled Chom Tian and Chom Thian.) (จอมเทียน, RTGS: Chom Thian, pronounced [tɕɔ̄ːm tʰīan]) or Jomtien Beach (หาดจอมเทียน, RTGS: Hat Chom Thian, pronounced [hàːt tɕɔ̄ːm tʰīan]) is a town on the east coast of the Gulf of Thailand about 165 km (103 mi) south-east of Bangkok in Bang Lamung District, Chonburi Province. It is about 3 km (1.9 mi) south of Pattaya and is home to high-rise condominiums, beach side hotels, beaches, and restaurants.

== The town ==
Jomtien has experienced a construction boom in the past several years, with many new condominiums and housing developments built in the area. Jomtien has become very popular with Bangkok residents seeking a second home, as well as with foreign retirees.

Jomtien Complex is an important real estate development located a block from the beach, and includes a large group of shophouses, restaurants, bars and stores. A recent trend has been the opening of many upscale restaurants along Thappraya Road, the main thoroughfare connecting Pattaya and Jomtien. In addition, Second Road (running parallel to Beach Road about 400 meters inland), was completed in the last few years and now features many new developments. Jomtien Market, located adjacent to another complex of about 60+ open-air bars, is now another focal point for beach-goers.

A large number of Russian and Scandinavian nationals visit or live in the area. In particular there are 2 large Norwegian colonies, called Nordic and New Nordic on the Phra Tamnak Hill.

== Attractions ==
Jomtien Beach is popular for swimming and windsurfing. Other water sports at the beach include jet skis, para-sailing, scuba diving, and for several annual sponsored sports events, such as a Jet Ski World Cup event, and festivals, attracting visitors from around the world.

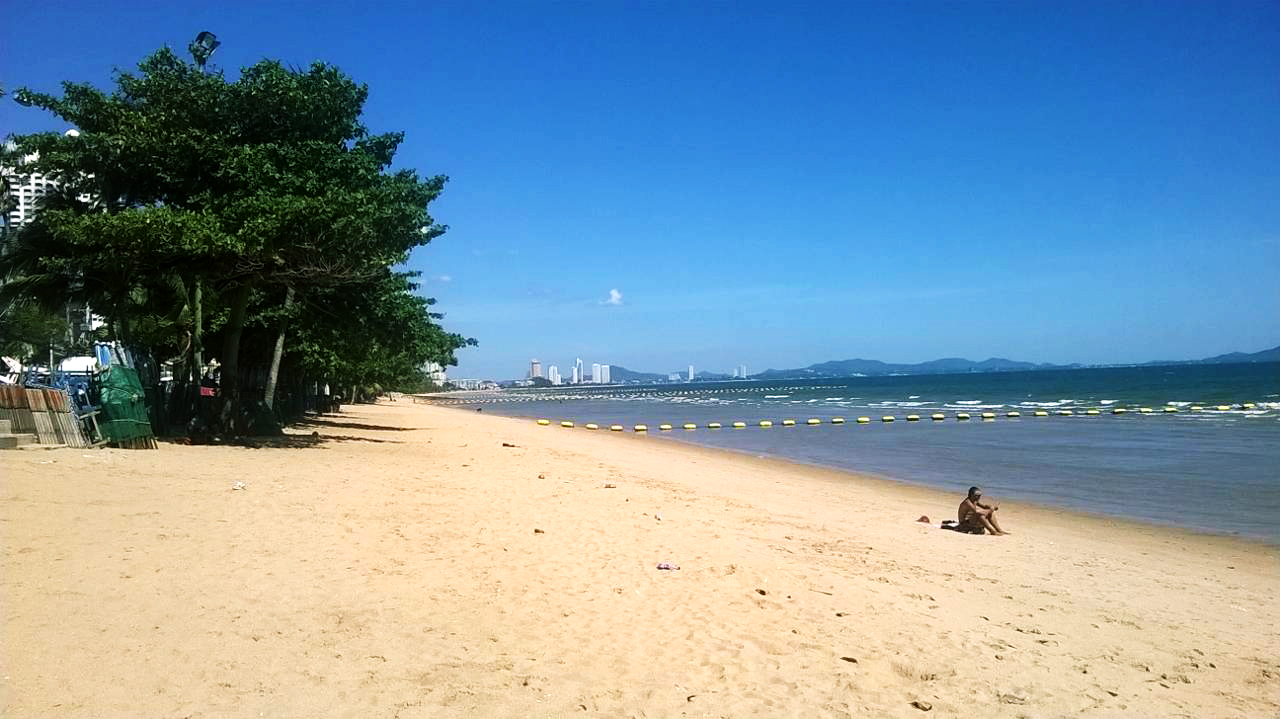
Jomtien Beach

== Transportation ==
=== Road ===
1. Via the Bangkok-Chonburi-Pattaya Motorway (Highway 7) The motorway is linked with Bangkok's Outer Ring Road, (Highway 9) and there is also another entrance at Si Nakharin and Rama IX Junction.
2. Via Bang Na-Trat Highway (Highway 34) From Bang Na, Bang Phli, across the Bang Pakong River to Chonburi there is a Chonburi's bypass that meets Sukhumvit Road., (Highway 3, passing Bang Saen Beach, Bang Phra to Pattaya.

==== City roads ====
- Jomtien Beach Road: this street runs parallel to the beach
- Jomtien Second Road (Thappraya Rd extension): this four-lane road runs parallel to Beach Road and connects to Thappraya Road to the north and Soi Wat Boon to the south.
- Thappraya Road: commences at the northern end of Jomtien Beach Road and at the junction of Jomtien Second Road turns left (north) and forms the main access road to Pattaya.
- Thepprasit Road: this street connects Thappraya Road to Sukhumvit Road.
- Soi Wat Boon: This street connects south Jomtien Beach Road to Sukhumvit Road.
- Soi Chayapruek: This street connects south Jomtien Beach Road to Sukhumvit Road.

=== Bus ===
Pattaya is served by frequent bus services from Bangkok's Northern Bus Terminal (Mo Chit) and the Eastern Bus Terminal (Ekamai). Buses from Pattaya serve nearby provincial towns and direct long distance routes serve many provincial capitals. City and suburban services are mainly provided by blue songthaews. They are available at the Pattaya Nuea bus terminal to take passengers to Jomtien Beach.

There is now a regular bus service from the bus depot on Thappraya Road (just north of Theprasit Rd intersection) to Suvarnabhumi Airport.

=== Taxis ===
There are some metered taxis and air-conditioned vans operating for private hire from some hotel car-parks. Songthaews (aka "bahtbus") are the most popular mode of public transportation, and run from Jomtien Beach to north Pattaya. On the regular route the cost is 10 baht for shorter distances and most Pattaya destinations or 20 baht for north Pattaya and beyond. However they can be much higher if asked to go to a designated destination. Motorbike taxis generally operate in the town and suburbs, and are mainly used by locals for short distances.

=== Air ===
Jomtien Beach is about 1-1/2 hours, or 120 km (75 mi) by road from Suvarnabhumi Airport, the Bangkok international hub. By road, it is accessed from Sukhumvit Road and Motorway 7 from Bangkok. There is a new airport bus service terminal located on Thappraya Road just north of the Thepprasit Road intersection. South of Jomtien Beach, the U-Tapao International Airport (UTP) is open to air traffic, it is about 50 min drive, or 40 km (25 mi) by road.

== See also ==
- Pattaya
- Phra Tamnak Hill
