= Fireball World Championship =

Dinghy sailing regatta

The Fireball World Championship is an annual international sailing regatta of Fireball (dinghy), organized by the host club on behalf of the International Fireball Class Association and recognized by World Sailing, the sports IOC recognized governing body. The class gained World Sailing recognition in 1970 but held three international regatta before that date.

== Events ==
Ed.			Hosts			Sailor			Boats				Ref.
No	Day/Month	Year	Host club	City	Country	No.	Nat.	Cont.	Boats			Mix	Ref.
1	-	1970	Tralee Sailing Club	Fenit, County Kerry	Ireland				47				
2	-	1971		Beirut	Lebanon	80	11	5	40				
3	-	1972	Carolina Yacht Club	Wrightsville Beach, N.C.	United States	68	13	6	34				
4	-	1973	Royal Torbay Yacht Club	Torquay, Devon	United Kingdom	112	18	5	56				
5	-	1974			Australia	56	11	5	28				
6	-	1975		Cannes	France	98	19	5	48				
7	10-16 Aug	1976		St, Margarets Bay, Nova Scotia	Canada	74	14	5	37				
8	-	1977			Ireland	90	20	5	46				
9	-	1978			Thailand	101	18	6	55				
10	-	1979		Minnickendam	Netherlands	110	18	5	66				
11	-	1980		Durban	South Africa	64	4	3	32				
12	-	1981		Weymouth	United Kingdom	94	12	5	48				
13	-	1982	Frankston Yacht Club	Frankston, Victoria	Australia	66	8	5	33				
14	-	1983	Cercle de La Voile S'Estavayer	Estavayer-Le-Lac	Switzerland	108	13	4	55				
15	-	1984	Richmond Yacht Club, California	Point Richmond, Richmond, California	United States	108	10	5	54				
16	25 Aug to 7 Sept	1985		Diano Marina	Italy	114	11	4	57				
17	5-13 June	1986	Pointe Claire Yacht Club	Pointe-Claire, Quebec	Canada	80	6	3	40				
18	15-23 Aug	1987		Le Val Andre	France	148	13	5	74				
19	6-13 Jan	1988		Glenelg	Australia	84	7	4	42				
20	-	1989		Paignton	United Kingdom	142	18	6	71				
21	2-2 Oct	1990		Enoshima	Japan	88	5	3	46				
22	18-25 Aug	1991		Angelholm	Sweden	112	14	3	59				
23	-	1992	Carolina Yacht Club	Wrightsville Beach, N.C.	United States	100	7	4	50				
24	-	1993			Belgium	144	14	4	72				
25	-	1994	Royal Natal Yacht Club	Durban	South Africa	156	11	5	78				
26	2-8 Sept	1995	National Yacht Club, Ireland	Dún Laoghaire	Ireland	176	11	4	88				
27	-	1996		Cork	Canada	102	9	3	51				
28	-	1997		Weymouth	United Kingdom	168	11	4	84				
29	-	1998	Frankston Yacht Club	Frankston, Victoria	Australia	182	12	4	91				
30	17–23 July	1999			France	164	11	3	82				
31	13-26 Mar	2000	Royal Varuna Yacht Club	Pattaya	Thailand	100	8	3	50				
32	21–28 July	2001		Bracciano	Italy	172	11	3	86				
33	10 Mar to 22 May	2002	Davis Island Yacht Club	Tampa, Florida	United States	110	11	4	55				
34	15-28 Feb	2003	Mnarani Club	Kilifi	Kenya	76	6	3	38				
35	2-10 Jan	2004	Adelaide Sailing Club	West Beach, Adelaide, SA	Australia	194	9	4	97				
36	6-19 Aug	2005	Teignmouth Sailing Club	Teignmouth	United Kingdom	350	13	4	175				
37	13–26 May	2006	CFSA Esquimalt	Esquimalt, BC	Canada	98	10	4	49				
38	23 Aug to 1 Sept	2007	St Moritz Segel-Club	St Moritz	Switzerland	190	13	4	95				
39	8-21 Mar	2008	Royal Varuna Yacht Club	Pattaya	Thailand	136	10	4	68				
40	15-28 Aug	2009	Societe des Regates Rochelaises	La Rochelle, Charente-Maritime	France	200	10	2	100				
41	24 Apr to 7 May	2010	Barbados Yacht Club	Bridgetown, Barbados	Barbados	138	13	5	70				
42	19–24 July	2011	Sligo Yacht Club	Rosses Point	Ireland	116	8	3	58				
43	27 Dec 2011 to 7 Jan	2012	Mandurah Offshore Fishing and Sailing Club	Mandurah, WA	Australia	128	7	4	64				
44	9-20 Sept	2013		Portorož	Slovenia	158	10	2	79	57	4	18	
45	17-28 Mar	2014	Royal Varuna Yacht Club	Pattaya	Thailand	42	7	5	21	17	0	4	
46	17-28 Aug	2015	Pwllheli Sailing Club	Pwllheli, Wales	United Kingdom	212	9	4	106	80	4	22	
47	5-16 Dec	2016	Mossel Bay Yacht and Boat Club	Mossel Bay, WC	South Africa	48	8	4	24	18	0	6	
N/A	-	2017	Not Held										
48	25-31 Aug	2018	Yacht Club de Carnac	Carnac, Morbihan, Brittany	France	202	11	4	101	72	4	25	
49	20-30 Aug	2019	Pointe Claire Yacht Club	Pointe-Claire, Quebec	Canada	84	10	4	42	30	0	12	
N/A	-	2020	Howth Yacht Club	Howth, Dublin	Ireland	Cancelled Due to COVID							
N/A	-	2021	Not Held										
50	18-26 Aug	2022	Lough Derg Yacht Club	Dromineer, County Tipperary	Ireland	158	11	5	79	53	5	21	
N/A	-	2023	Not Held										
51	9-16 Feb	2024	Royal Geelong Yacht Club	Geelong, Victoria	Australia	114	8	3	57	42	0	15	
52	22-29 Aug	2025	Circolo Vela Arco	Lake Garda	Italy	272	14	4	136	92	3	41	
53	Aug	2026	Royal Torbay Yacht Club	Torbay	United Kingdom	168	10	4	84	63	2	19	

== Multiple champions ==
Compiled from the data below the table includes up to and including 2026.

Ranking	Sailor	Gold	Silver	Bronze	Total	No. Entries
1	Vyv Townend (GBR)	6	3	1	10	17
2	Tom Gillard (GBR)	6	1	2	9	10
3	Chips Howarth (GBR)	4	0	0	4	6
4	Ian Pinnel (GBR)	3	7	1	11	11
5	Richard Wagstaff (GBR)	3	3	2	8	20
6	John Dransfield (AUS)	3	0	1	4	5
7	Sam Brearey (GBR)	2	2	0	4	6
8	Jim Turner (GBR)	2	1	1	4	6
9	Colin Goodman (GBR)	2	1	0	3	5
9	Daniel Cripps (GBR)	2	1	0	3	4
11	David Edwards (GBR)	2	0	3	5	9
12	Andrew Perry (AUS)	2	0	1	3	5
13	Steve Benjamin (USA)	2	0	0	2	2
13	Tucker Edmundson (USA)	2	0	0	2	2
13	Jack Davis (GBR)	2	0	0	2	5
13	John Caig (GBR)	2	0	0	2	3

== Medalists ==
Year	Gold	Silver	Bronze	Ref.
1971 - Beirut; Lebanon; 40 Boats	K 1572; John Caig (GBR); Jack Davis (GBR)	G 6220; Jörg Diesch (GER); Eckart Diesch (GER)	S 2533; C-E. Warfvinge (SWE); S. Warfvinge (SWE)	
1972 - Wrightsville Beach; United States; 34 Boats	G 2533; Jorg Diesch (GER); Sten Warfvinge (GER)	Z 7896; Jean-C. Vithier (SUI); Pierre Walt (SUI)	KA 6526; Bryan Inns (AUS); Mike Rogers (AUS)	
1973 - Torbay; Great Britain; 56 Boats	K 8520; Ken Brackwell (GBR); Richard Butcher (GBR)	US 8571; G Hall (USA); Unknown	K 8349; A Procter (GBR); Unknown	
1974; Australia; 28 Boats	Ome'N'Osed - KA 8178; John Cassidy (AUS); Warwick Crisp (AUS)	James III - KA 8196; Jamie Wilmot (AUS); Unknown	Screwdriver - KA 8150; B. Lucas (AUS); Unknown	
1975; France; Boats	US 9798; Joan Ellis (USA); Art Ellis (USA)	KR 7755; Morgenrood; Lapham	US 9800: Davis (USA); Davis (USA)	
1976; Canada; 76 Boats	US 10149; Steve Benjamin (USA); Tucker Edmundson (USA)	K 9874; Frank Davies (GBR); Unknown	K 9845; Mike Mountfield (GBR); Unknown	
1977; Ireland; 46 Boats	US 10149; Steve Benjamin (USA); Tucker Edmundson (USA)	K 11218; Lawrie Smith (GBR); Andy Barker (GBR)	K 11059: Tushingham (GBR); Locke (GBR)	
1978; Thailand; 55 Boats	K 11218; Lawrie Smith (GBR); Andy Barker (GBR)	K 11609; Kim Slater (GBR); Nick Read-Wilson (GBR)	KA 10952; Gordon Lucas (AUS); John Gardiner (AUS)	
1979; Netherlands; 66 Boats	K 12218; Crispin Read-Wilson (GBR); Paul Withers (GBR)	K 11660; Paul McNamara (GBR); Nigel Vivian (GBR)	K 11174; Frank Davis (GBR); Ray Gosling (GBR)	
1980; South Africa; 32 Boats	Maid for Pleasure - K 11609; Kim Slater (GBR); Richard Parslow (GBR)	Root 'n Toot - SA 11431; Jean-Jacques Provoyeur (RSA); Terry Twentyman Jones (RSA)	Lo Shiesa Amsende - SA 10795; Dave Hudson (RSA); Terry Reynolds (RSA)	
1981; Great Britain; 48 Boats	K 12906; Phil Morrison (GBR); Jonathan Turner (GBR)	K 12918; Lawrie Smith (GBR); Mark Simpson (GBR)	K 12912; Eddie Warden-Owen (GBR); Simon Stewart (GBR)	
1982; Australia; 33 Boats	KA 12768 - Fascination; Christopher Tillett (AUS); Mike Rogers (AUS)	K 12851 - No Name; Jeremy Bickerton (GBR); Jeremy Richards (GBR)	K 12992 - Pumprocker; Dave Derby (GBR); Kym Leatt (GBR)	
1983; Switzerland; 55 Boats	KA 12783; Stuart Hamilton (AUS); David Connor (AUS)	SA 13226; J. Coblenz (RSA); D. Kitchen (RSA)	K 13246; Mark Rushall (GBR); Richard Parslow (GBR)	
1984; United States; 54 Boats	KA 13198; Gary Smith (AUS); Nigel Connor (AUS)	K 13459; Mark Rushall (GBR); Baxter (GBR)	KA 12780; Irwin (AUS); Chadwick (AUS)	
1985; Italy; 57 Boats	K 13482; Tony Wetherell (GBR); Martin Penty (GBR)	K 13553; Tim Rush (GBR); Hemmings (GBR)	IR 13300; Adrian Bell (IRL); Maeve Bell (IRL)	
1986; Canada; 40 Boats	KA 13216; Nigel Abbott (AUS); Craig Smith (AUS)	K 13741; Graham Cook (GBR); Robert Cage (GBR)	K 13785; Tony Wetherell (GBR); Andy Barker (GBR)	
1987; France; 74 Boats	K 13845; Ian Pinnell (GBR); Daniel Cripps (GBR)	K 13482; Jim Hunt (GBR); Martin Penty (GBR)	KA 13207; Susan Delange (AUS); Chris Byrne (AUS)	
1988; Australia; 42 Boats	KA 13695 - Driving Force; John Clifton (AUS); Paul Martin (AUS)	K 13845 - Boy Racer; Ian Pinnell (GBR); Daniel Cripps (GBR)	KA 13684 - Crocodile J.D. John Dransfield (AUS); Andrew Perry (AUS)	
1989; Great Britain; 46 Boats	KA 13684; John Dransfield (AUS); Andrew Perry (AUS)	K 14100; Hall (GBR); Constable (GBR)	K 14016; Ian Pinnell (GBR); Jarrod Simpson (GBR)	
1990 - Enoshima; Japan; 46 Boats	KA 14150; John Dransfield (AUS); Andrew Perry (AUS)	K 14134; Ian Pinnell (GBR); Jarrod Simpson (GBR)	KA 14158; Campbell Myles (AUS); Chris Byrne (AUS)	
1991 - Angelholm; Sweden; 59 Boats	KA 14151; John Dransfield (AUS); Gregor Baird (AUS)	K 13684; Marsden GBR; Walker GBR	K 14200; David Hall (GBR); Paul Constable (GBR)	
1992; United States; 50 Boats	SA 14311; Martin Lambrecht (RSA); Alec Lanham-Love (RSA)	K 14103; John Merricks (GBR); Vyv Townend (GBR)	K 14277; Paul Bedell (GBR); Paul Withers (GBR)	
1993; Belgium; 72 Boats	GBR 14061; Tim Rush (GBR); Jon Ward (GBR)	GBR 14372; Liz Rushall (GBR); Mark Rushall (GBR)	FRA 14335; J Scale (FRA); Edouard Koch (FRA)	
1994 - Durban; South Africa; 78 Boats	GBR 14415; Ian Pinnell (GBR); Daniel Cripps (GBR)	SUI 14376; Urs Schar (SUI); Ruedi Moser (SUI)	AUS 13946; Peter Cook (AUS); Andrew Batty (AUS)	
1995 - Dun Laoghaire; Ireland; 88 Boats	IRL 14378; John Lavery (IRL); David O'Brien (IRL)	GBR 14385; Colin Goodman (GBR); Jim Turner (GBR)	GBR 14486; Malcolm Davies (GBR); Ian Cadwallader (GBR)	
1996 - Cork; Canada; 51 Boats	GBR 14385; Colin Goodman (GBR); Jim Turner (GBR)	SUI 114540; Erich Moser (SUI); Ruedi Moser (SUI)	CAN 14418; Tof Nicoll-Griffith (CAN); Peter Kelly (CAN)	
1997; Great Britain; 84 Boats	GBR 14509; David Edwards (GBR); Adam Bowers (GBR)	GBR 14623; Ian Pinnell (GBR); John Ward (GBR)	GBR 13945; Malcolm Davies (GBR); Ian Cadwallader (GBR)	
1998; Australia; 92 Boats	Kojake Roll - 14579; Colin Goodman (GBR); Jim Turner (GBR)	14623; Ian Pinnell (GBR); John Ward (GBR)	Reginale - 13945; Malcolm Davies (GBR); Russell Thorne (GBR)	
1999; France; 82 Boats	Benoit Petit (FRA); Jean-Francois Cuzon (FRA)	Ian Pinnell (GBR); Matthew Flint (GBR)	David Edwards (GBR); Vyv Townend (GBR)	
2000 - Pattaya; Thailand; 50 Boats	GBR 14708; David Edwards (GBR); Vyv Townend (GBR)	GBR 14701; Ian Pinnell (GBR); Matthew Flint (GBR)	AUS 14603; Robin Inns (AUS); Jason Heritage (AUS)	
2001 - Bracciano; Italy; 86 Boats	GBR 14685; Steve Morrison (GBR); Liam Murray (GBR)	GBR 14766; Ian Pinnell (GBR); David Scott (GBR)	CZE 14712; Tomás Musil (CZE); Milan Kolacek (CZE)	
2002 - Tampa; United States; 55 Boats	14790; Ian Pinnell (GBR); David Scott (GBR)	14785; Richard Estaugh (GBR); Simon Potts (GBR)	14540; Erich Moser (SUI); Ruedi Moser (SUI)	
2003 - Kilifi; Kenya; 38 Boats	14708; Chips Howarth (GBR); Vyv Townend (GBR)	14809; David Wade (GBR); Richard Wagstaff (GBR)	14770; Vincent Horey (GBR); Jim Turner (GBR)	
2004; Australia; 97 Boats	14801; Andy Smith (GBR); James Meldrum (GBR)	14712; Tomás Musil (CZE); Jan Danek (CZE)	14809; David Wade (GBR); Richard Wagstaff (GBR)	
2005 - Teignmouth; Great Britain; 175 Boats	14830; Chips Howath (GBR); Vyv Townend (GBR)	14895; Andy Smith (GBR); Jonathan Mildred (GBR)	14614; Guy Tipton (GBR); Chris Tattersall (GBR)	
2006 - Esquimalt, BC; Canada; 49 Boats	14799; Erich Moser (SUI); Ruedi Moser (SUI)	14911; Grant LAMONT (CAN); Thomas Egli (CAN)	14813; Heather MacFarlane (AUS); Chris Payne (AUS)	
2007 - St Moritz; Switzerland; 95 Boats	14948; Richard Estaugh (GBR); Rob Gardner (GBR)	14920; Vincent Horey (GBR); Andy Thompson (GBR)	14960; Tom Jeffcoate (GBR); Mark Hogan (GBR)	
2008 - Pattaya; Thailand; 68 Boats	14919; Matt Mee (GBR); Richard Wagstaff (GBR)	14976; David Wade (GBR); Ben McGrane (GBR)	14587; Nathan Stockley (AUS); Sam Muirhead (AUS)	
2009 - La Rochelle; France; 100 Boats	GBR 15013; Chips Howarth (GBR); Vyv Townend (GBR)	GBR 14994; Matt Burge (GBR); Richard Wagstaff (GBR)	GBR 14924; David Edwards (GBR); Simon Potts (GBR)	
2010; Barbados; 70 Boats	15013; Chips Howarth (GBR); Vyv Townend (GBR)	15036; Matt Burge (GBR); Richard Wagstaff (GBR)	14924; David Edwards (GBR); Simon Potts (GBR)	
2011 - Slingo; Ireland; 58 Boats	15036; Matt Burge (GBR); Richard Wagstaff (GBR)	15041; Tom Gillard (GBR); Sam Brearey (GBR)	15045; David Wade (GBR); Simon Potts (GBR)	
2012 - Perth; Australia; 64 Boats	GBR 15041; Thomas Gillard (GBR); Sam Brearey (GBR)	AUS 15025; Robin Inns (AUS); Joel Coultas (AUS)	AUS 15032; Greg Allison (AUS); Richard Watson (AUS)	
2013 - Portorož; Slovenia; 79 Boats	GBR 15091; Thomas Gillard (GBR); Simon Potts (GBR)	GBR 15089; Christian Birrell (GBR); Sam Brearey (GBR)	GBR 15093; Matt Burge (GBR); Richard Wagstaff (GBR)	
2014 - Pattaya; Thailand; 21 Boats	GBR 15107; Christian Birrell (GBR); Sam Brearey (GBR)	GBR 15087; Nathan Batchelor (GBR); Sam Pascoe (GBR)	AUS 15062; Ben Schulz (AUS); Doug Sheppard (AUS)	
2015; Great Britain; 107 Boats	Allen - 15127; Thomas Gillard (GBR); Richard Anderton (GBR)	Weathermark Sailboats - 15129; James Peters (GBR); Fynn Sterritt (GBR)	Makira - 15107; Christian Birrell (GBR); Sam Brearey (GBR)	
2016; South Africa; 25 Boats	15127; Thomas Gillard (GBR); Richard Anderton (GBR)	14799; Ruedi Moser (SUI); Claude Mermod (SUI)	15113; Jack Lidjett (AUS); Ben Schulz (AUS)	
2017	Not Held			
2018 - Carnac; France; 100 Boats	GBR 15123; Matt Burge (GBR); Daniel Schieber (GBR)	GBR 15096; Penny Clark (GBR); Russell Clark (GBR)	GBR 15127; Thomas Guillard (GBR); Geoff Edwards (GBR)	
2019 - Canada; 41 Boats>	15161; Ian Dobson (GBR); Richard Wagstaff (GBR)	15152; Heather MacFarlane (AUS); Chris Payne (AUS)	14917; Ludovic Collin (FRA); Remy Thuiller (FRA)	
2020; Ireland	Cancelled – COVID-19			
2021	Not Held			
2022	GBR 15122; Thomas Gillard (GBR); Shandy Thompson (GBR)	SUI 14799; Claude Mermod (SUI); Ruedi Moser (SUI)	AUS 15152; Heather MacFarlane (AUS); Chris Payne (AUS)	
2023	Not Held			
2024	GBR 15122; Thomas Gillard (GBR); Andy Thompson (GBR)	GBR 15144 - Mondo; DJ Edwards (GBR); Vyv Townend (GBR)	AUS 15026 - Black Pearl; Brendan Garner (AUS); Ben O'Brien (AUS)	
2025	SUI-14961; Yves Mermod (SUI); Maja Siegenthaler (SUI)	GBR 15144 - Mondo; DJ Edwards (GBR); Vyv Townend (GBR)	GBR 15122; Thomas Gillard (GBR); Andy Thompson (GBR)	
2026	GBR 15144 - Mondo; DJ Edwards (GBR); Vyv Townend (GBR)	GBR 15174; Simon Kings (GBR); Jono Loe (GBR)	GBR 15192; Dave Wade (GBR); Iain Blake (GBR)	
