= Abhakara Kiartivongse monument, Pattaya =

Monument in Pattaya, Thailand

Abhakara Kiartivongse monument
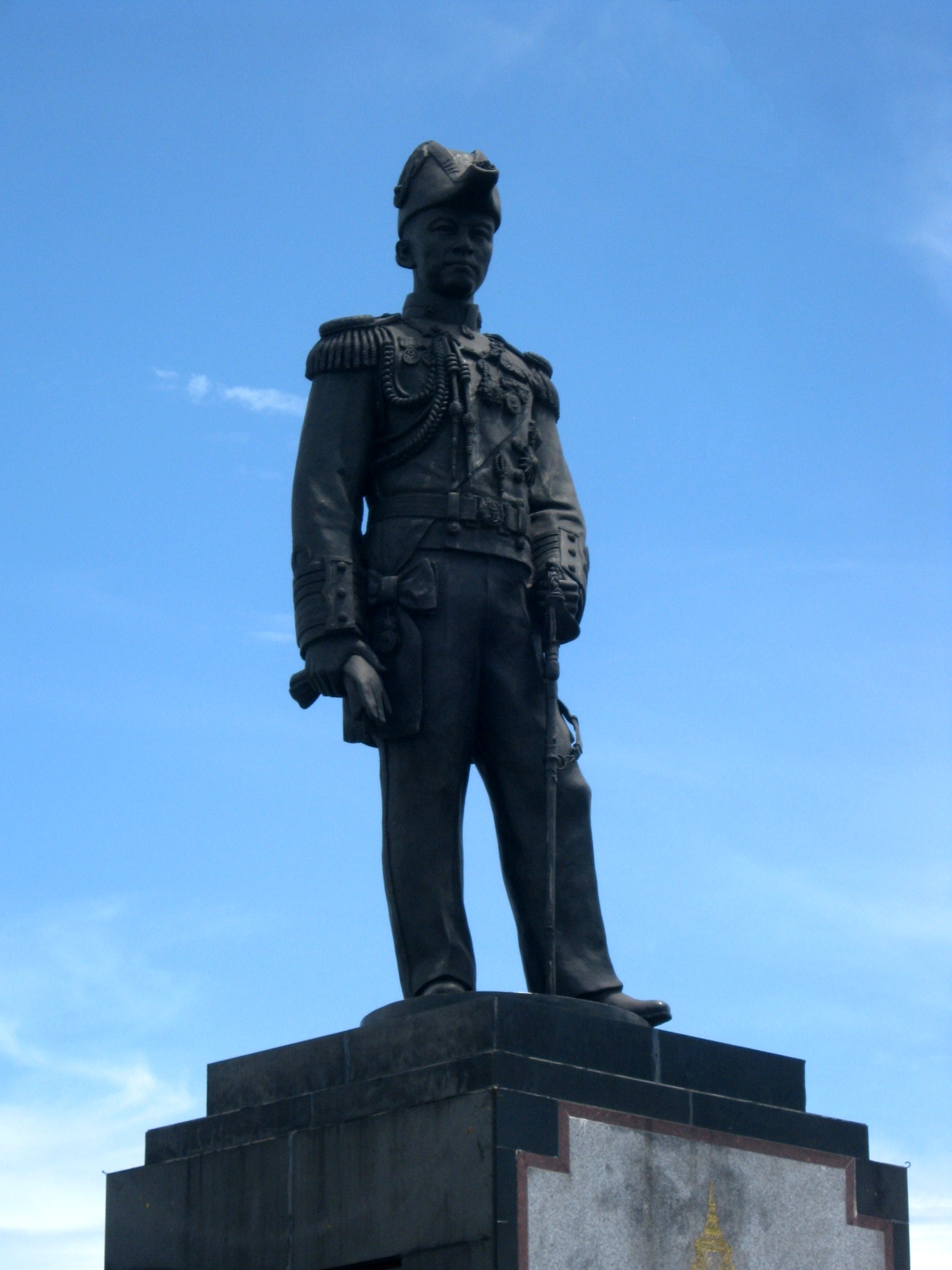
- Type: Bronze
- Location: Pattaya, Thailand; 12°55′19.2″N 100°51′57.9″E

Abhakara Kiartivongse monument — Bronze statue of Admiral of the Royal Thai Navy Abhakara Kiartivongse - Prince of Chumphon, mounted on a stone pedestal on the high natural Pratumnak hill in Pattaya, 98 meters above sea level.

== Description ==
The monument is one of more than 200 monuments to Admiral Prince Kiartivongse throughout the country, but the most famous among all. This is due to the fact that Thailand's main naval base, Sattahip, 40 kilometers south of Pattaya, was founded by this admiral in 1922. He is known as the founder and first commander of the Royal Thai Navy.

On 20 November, Navy Day in Thailand, and 19 May, the memorial day of Admiral Kiartivongse, ceremonies are held at the monument and military honors are given. Often at the event there are delegations of foreign sailors.

== Location ==
Its location on the high hill, Pratumnak, the highest point of the city offers views of the Gulf of Thailand, Ko Lan, Pattaya Beach and Pratamnak hill, the entire central part of the city.

The admiral's sculpture is set on a massive rectangular pedestal lined with black marble surrounded by figures of sailors. The admiral is represented in ceremonial uniform with all the regalia. The height of the composition is more than 15 meters.

The construction of the Waterfront Suites and Residence in the early 2010s has blocked the statue's main view of the sea, causing controversy.

== Gallery ==
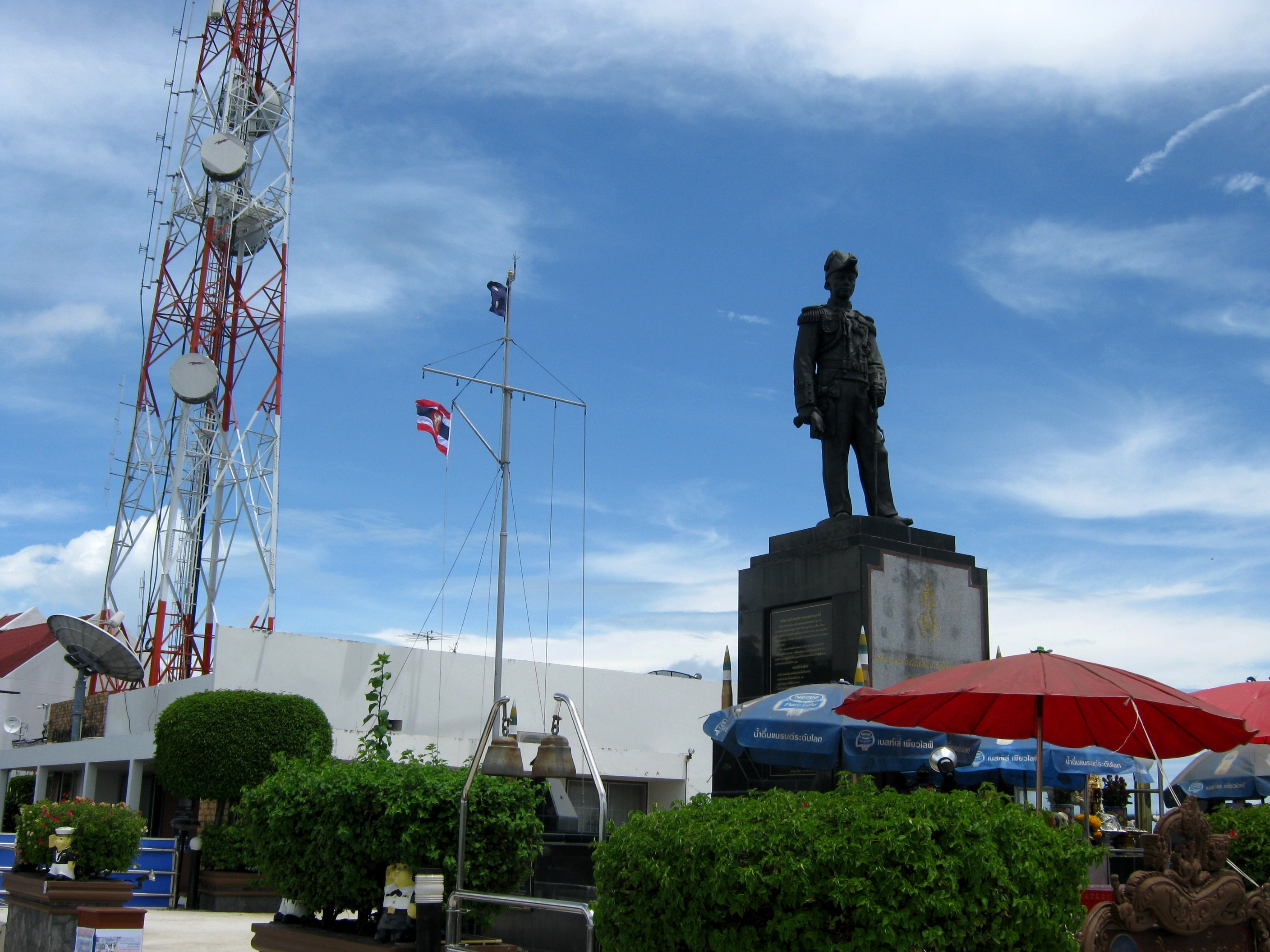
General view of the monument

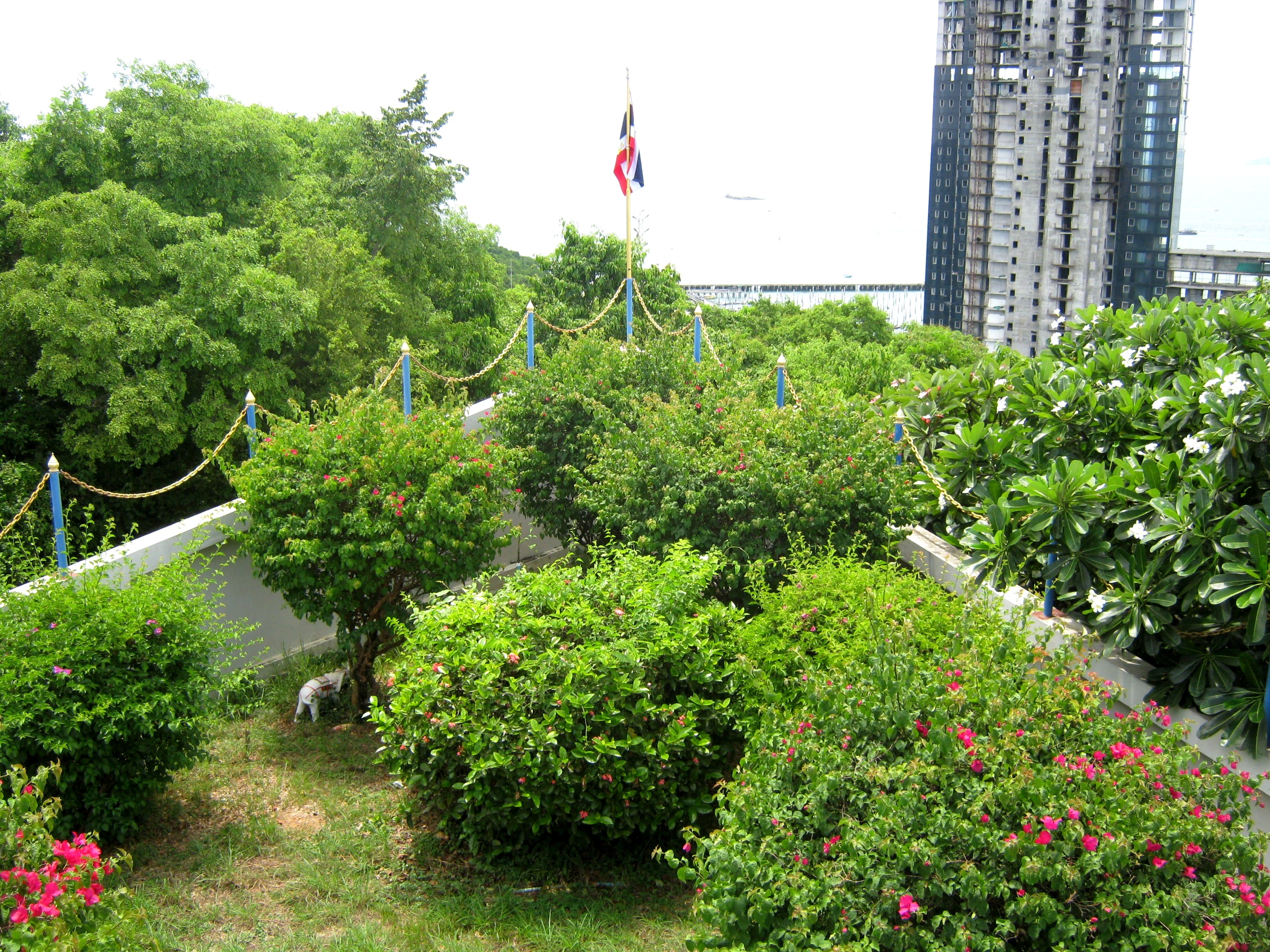
Improvised prow

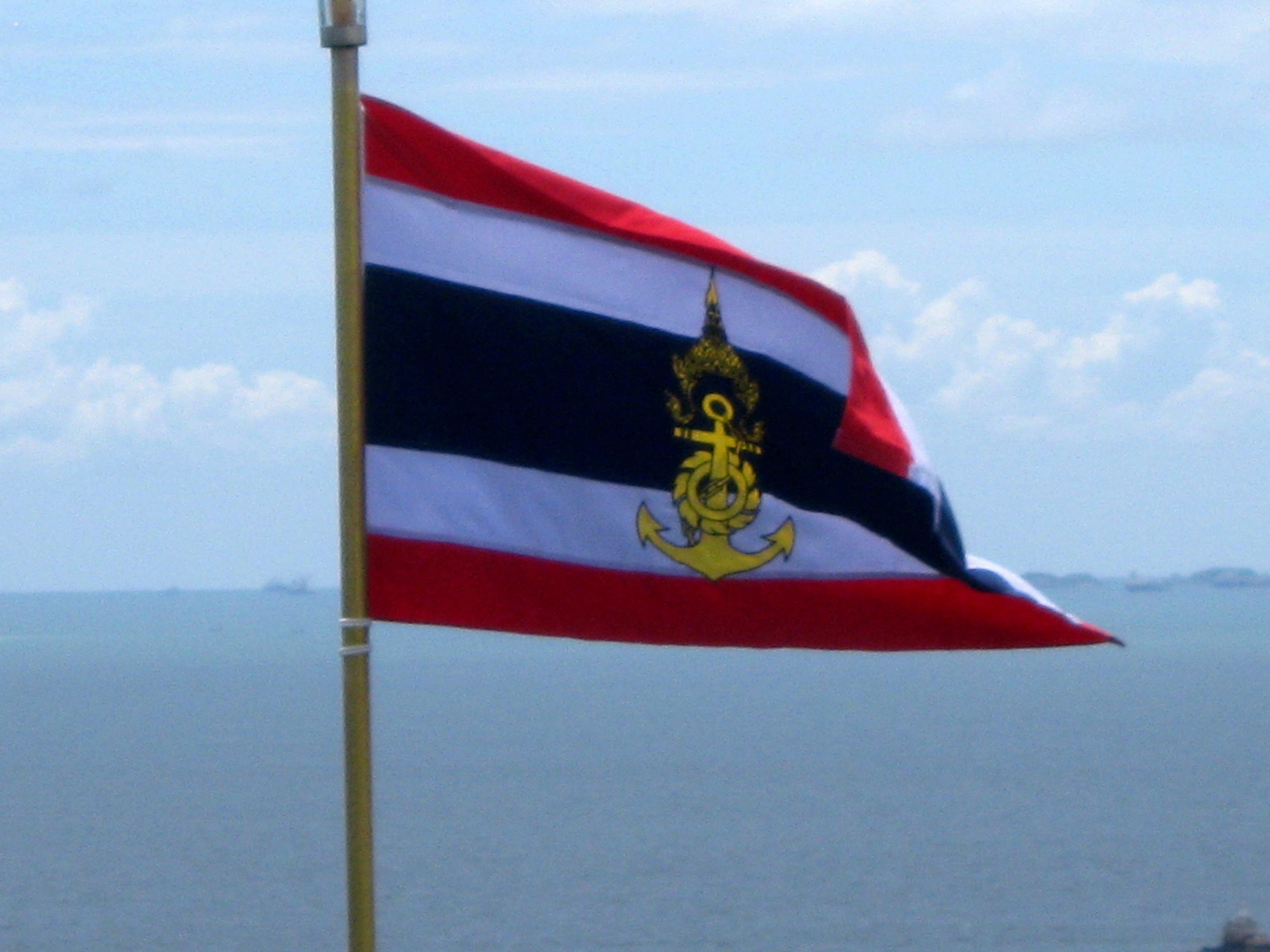
Huys Thailand Navy on the bow of the ship
