= RBYC =

RBYC or R.B.Y.C. may refer to:

- 'Royal Barbados Yacht Club (founded 1924, and now the Barbados Yacht Club)
- Royal County of Berkshire Yacht Club (founded 1994)
- Royal Bermuda Yacht Club (founded 1844)
- Royal Bombay Yacht Club (founded 1846)
- Royal Brighton Yacht Club (founded 1875)
- Royal Burnham Yacht Club (founded 1895)
