= GCM =

GCM may refer to:

== Awards ==
- Good Conduct Medal (United States), a military award
- Grand Cross of the Order of Merit (Portugal)
- Knight Grand Cross Royal Order of Monisaraphon, post-nominal letters

== Organizations ==
- GCM Resources, a British mining company
- Global Campaign for Microbicides
- Great Commission Ministries, an American Christian evangelistic organization
- Great Central Mines, a defunct Australian mining company

== Science and technology ==
- Galois/Counter Mode, in cryptography
- General circulation model, or global climate model
- Google Cloud Messaging
- Greatest common measure
- Ground continuity monitor

== Transport ==
- Claremore Regional Airport, in Oklahoma (FAA LID code)
- Owen Roberts International Airport, Grand Cayman, Cayman Islands (IATA code)
- Grand Central Madison, a commuter rail terminal

== Other uses ==
- Global Compact for Migration, a proposed international treaty
- Grand Corps Malade (born 1977), French slam poet
- Gross combination mass
- Genesis Climber MOSPEADA, a Japanese animated TV series
