= The Waterfront Suites and Residence =

- วอเตอร์ฟรอนท์สวีทแอนด์เรสซิเดนซ์
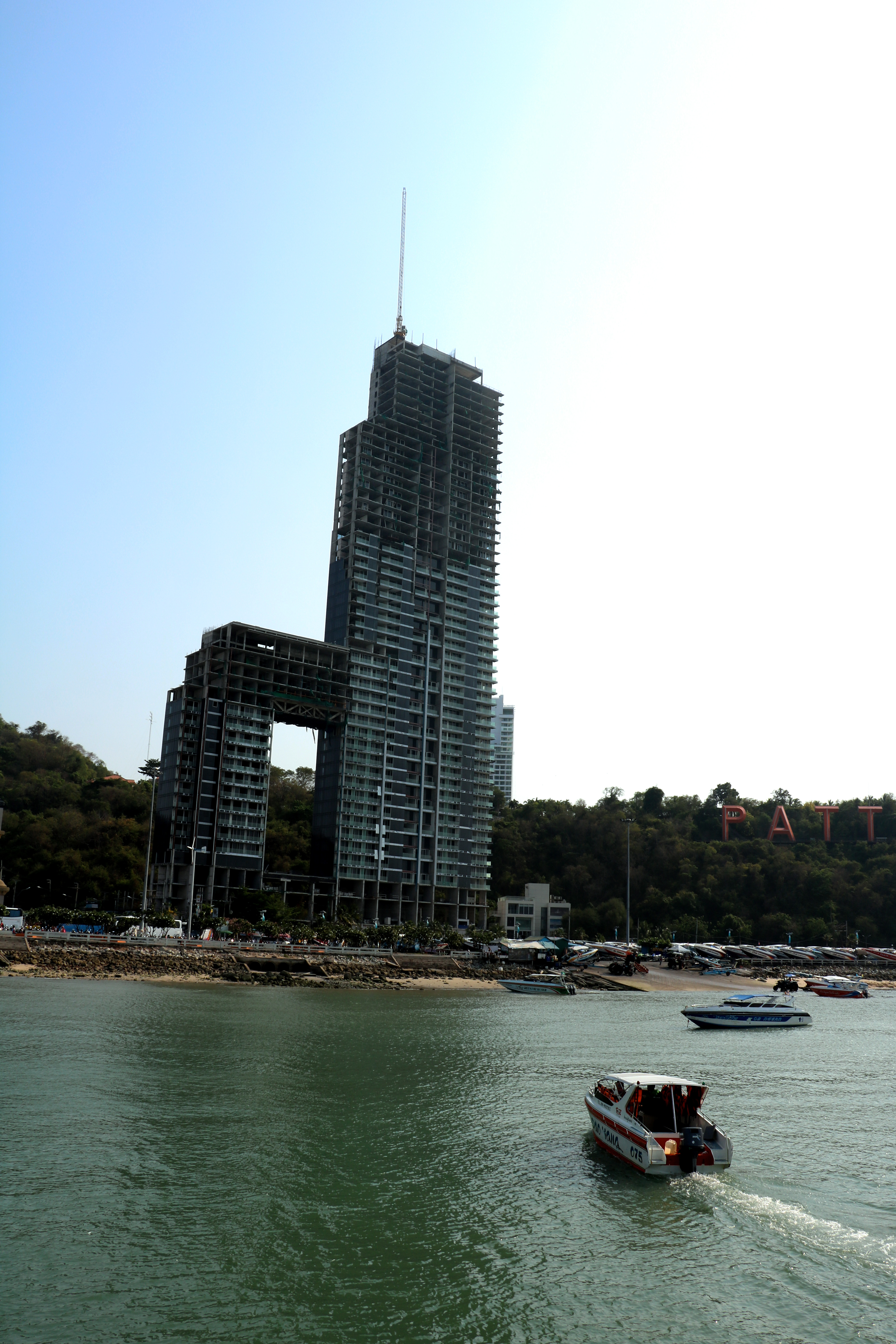
- In 2016 with the crane still in place
- Interactive map of the The Waterfront Suites and Residence area
- Alternative names: Water Front Condominium

General information
- Status: Incomplete
- Type: Condominium
- Architectural style: Postmodern architecture
- Location: Pattaya, Chonburi province, Thailand
- Coordinates: 12°55′29″N 100°51′58″E
- Construction started: 2011
- Construction stopped: 16 July 2014

Technical details
- Floor count: 53

Design and construction
- Developer: Bali Hai Co. Ltd
- Main contractor: Thai Engineering

The Waterfront Suites and Residence is an unfinished and abandoned condominium located on Chalermphrakiat road in Pattaya, Chonburi province, Thailand. Standing at 53 stories high, the building began development in 2011 but was halted in 2014. The building has an area of 38,530 m^{2}, and was designed to stand at 57 stories. The building has commonly been described as an "eyesore".

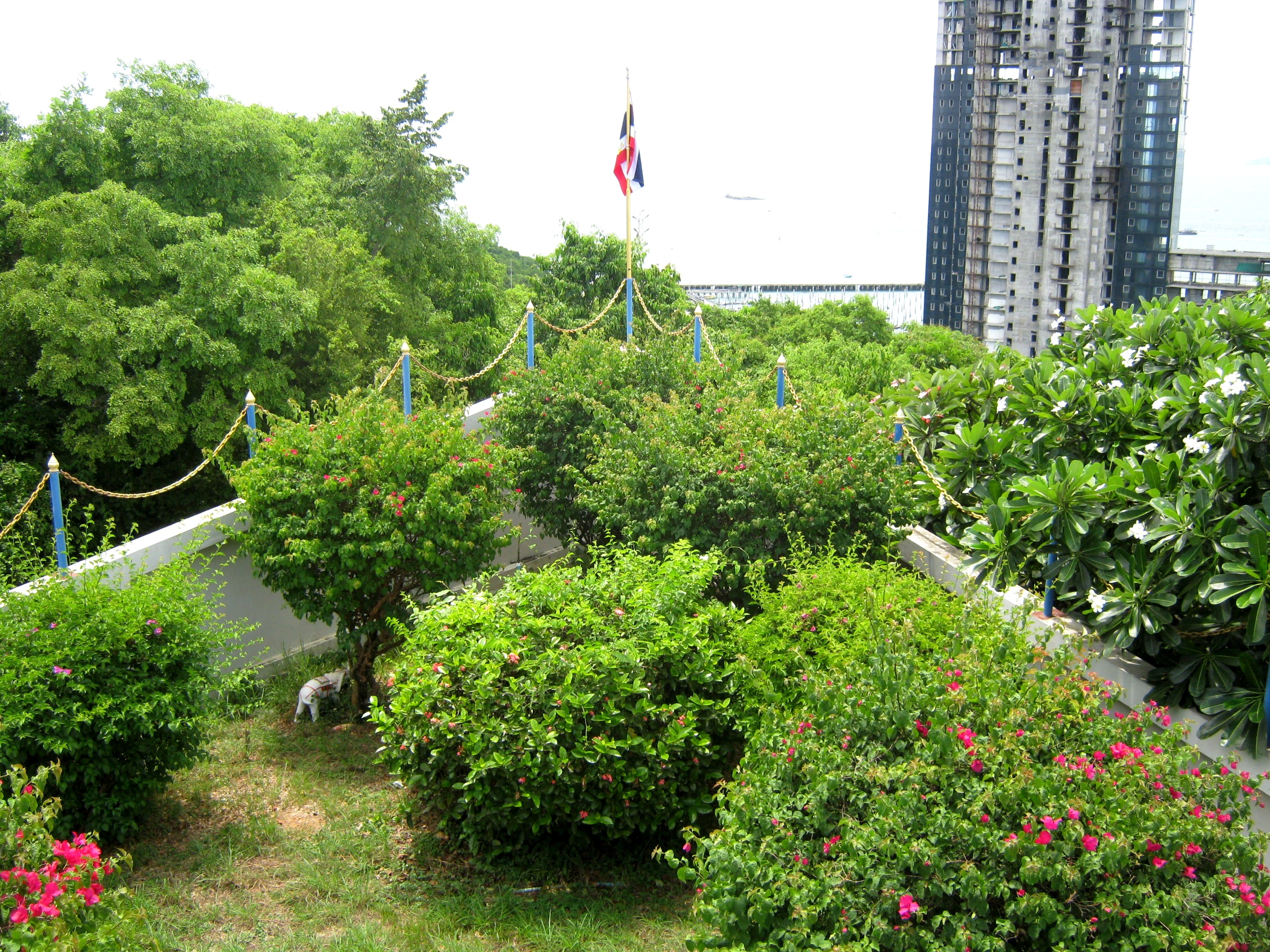
The Abhakara Kiartivongse monument's view of the sea has been mainly blocked by the building's construction (as seen in the left)

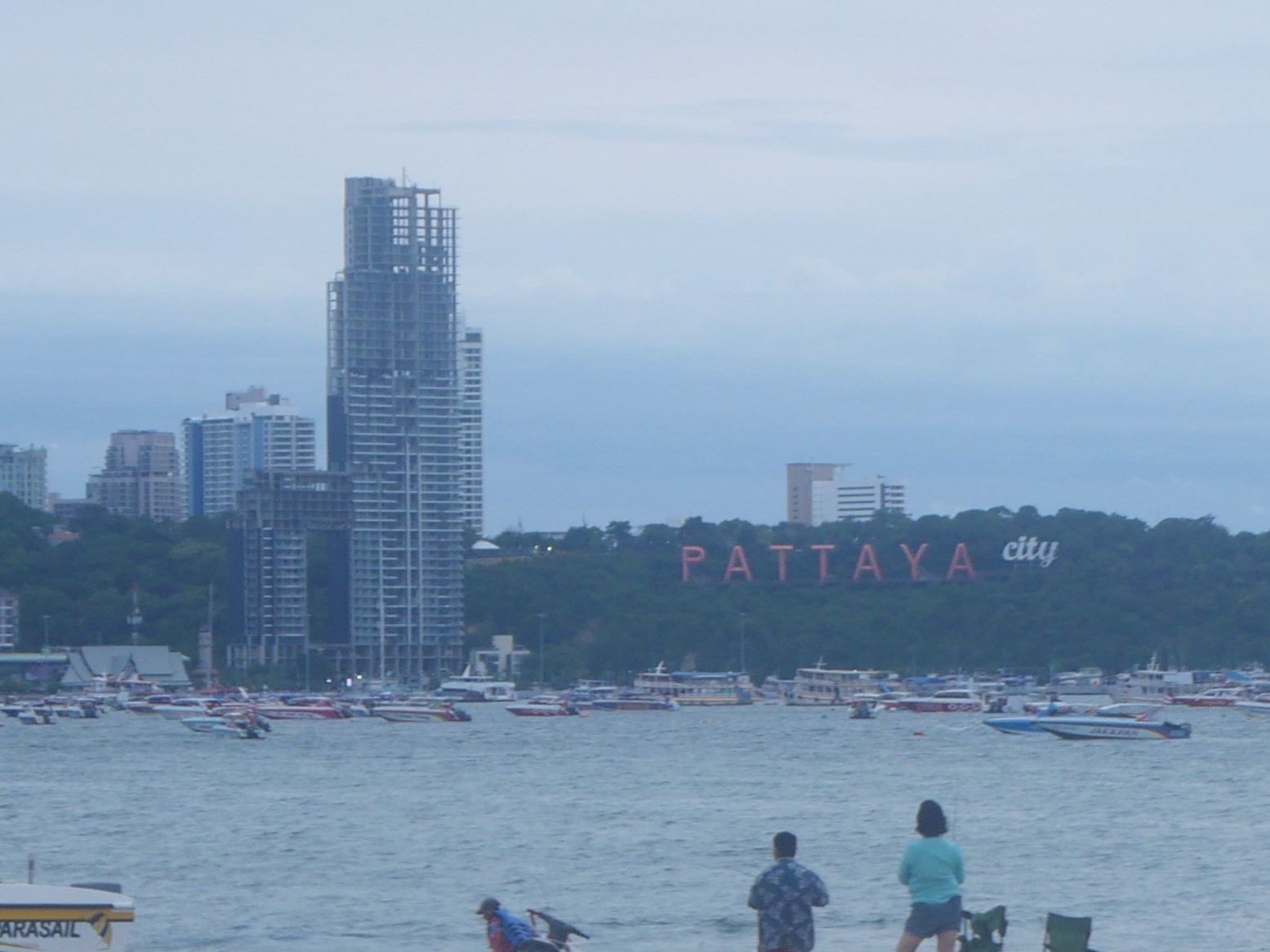
The building viewed besides the Pattaya City sign

== History ==
Development of the Waterfront Suites and Residence by Bali Hai Co. Ltd, began in 2004 with Thai Engineering as its main contractor. The Bali Hai company is an Israeli company part of the Tulip group

During the approval stage, Pattaya City Hall opposed the building's height and its impact on the skyline, but was overruled by the building board and regional leaders. The building began development near the Bali Hai pier. Construction laws in the area forbids the construction of a building within 100 meters of the waterline, but Pattaya City had just approved a project that extended the area into the sea by 100 meters, allowing the building to build closer to the current shore. Currently, the project to extend the waterline is ongoing.

In May 2008, a Chonburi Province panel approved an environmental-impact report submitted by Bali Hai company, and forwarded the report to the Office of Natural Resources and Environmental Policy and Planning.

On 1 May 2008, the Bali Hai company sought building permission, and on 10 September, the Mayor of Pattaya, Itthiphol Khunpluem, approved construction of the project.

Construction started in early 2011 with the expection of it being finished by late 2016.

=== Construction halt ===
In 2014, the condo's construction faced criticism from the internet due to the building blocking the Abhakara Kiartivongse monument's view of the sea; the monument is dedicated to Abhakara Kiartivongse, who is regarded as the Father of the Royal Thai navy, and is supposed to be pointing to the sea. Itthiphol responded to criticism by saying that the project followed correct and clear legal processes; while the Bali Hai company said that they complied with all required legal proceedings. However, it was later discovered by safety inspectors that construction varied from approved designs, particularly with its fire escapes and elevators. Due to this, Pattaya City officials ordered construction to be halted on 16 July 2014. Allegedly, this was ignored by Thai Engineering who continued construction until a press conference was called by Itthiphol on 18 August to address mounting criticism of the project. Thai Engineering defended themselves by saying that the order to halt had not been communicated to them by the developers. Criticism of the building mainly originated from social media and environmentalist groups who criticised its placement and height; while some wrote to the National Council for Peace and Order to investigate.

Itthiphol continued to state that the project followed correct and transparent legal processes. In late 2014, Itthiphol said that the building's elevators and fire exits differed from approved plans, and that if changes were significant then Pattaya City would have to go to court to have the project demolished. He also continued to claim that government officials were not at fault and that the developers were to blame; while Bali Hai company blamed it on the contractors; with the contractors blaming the changes on the developers.

Despite construction halting, Bali Hai company continued to sell condos and in May 2015 published a chart showing only 38 spaces left for purchase. The condominium's sale office also continued to promote spaces through their website. However, Bali Hai company faced lawsuits from condo owners and other groups such as the construction company. This led to the company filing for debt restructuring with the Central Bankruptcy Court for more than 2.3 billion baht on 16 January 2017. However, the company went bankrupt.

In mid 2018, a crane still situated on top of the building ordered by Pattaya City to be removed over concerns of its collapsing and was removed on 10 September 2018 by Worakit Construction Company.

Due to pending legal cases around the building, the Pattaya City Council is unable to demolish the building. Along with this, proposals to demolish it by the City council had been rejected by the Construction Engineering Department and the Department of Public Works due to the unknown cost of removing the structure. On 26 September 2020, the issue of demolition was brought up in a council meeting again by Choti Chothikamjorn. In late November, 2020, the Mayor of Pattaya, Sonthaya Khunplume, said he would use city resources to bring down the building and then forward the cost onto the companies.

=== Corruption case ===
On 25 July 2023, the National Anti-Corruption Organization found enough evidence to believe Itthiphol Khunpluem broke the law under Section 157 of the Criminal Code, and the case was forwarded to the Criminal Court for Misconduct and Corruption Cases.

On 5 September 2023, Criminal Court for Misconduct and Corruption Cases approved the arrest warrant for Itthiphol over his approval of the building project in 2008. However, Itthiphol had fled to Cambodia on 30 August, but returned on October 9, he was arrested by authorities at Suvarnabhumi airport after returning from Cambodia. Itthiphol is facing charges of misfeasance.

On October 11, the National Anti-Corruption Commission found that the land the building was built on may have been public property.
