= Henry Fraser (physician) =

Barbadian Physician, Academic and Historian

Henry Fraser KA GCM
- Born: Henry Stuart Fraser; 25 June 1944 (age 82); Four Roads, Barbados
- Education: University of West Indies Jamaica
- Occupation: Professor of Medicine
- Known for: Barbadian Intellectual

Henry Fraser (born June 25, 1944, at Four Roads, Barbados) is a Barbadian physician, columnist, academic and historian He has been described as the "Renaissance man of Barbados".

== Early life ==
He attended The Lodge School in September 1952 and graduated in 1962 winning a scholarship. Fraser enrolled in the University of West Indies in Mona, Jamaica in September, 1962 in medical school. He attended the University College London in September 1964 and graduated with a BSc Physiology Hons ( Upper Second) in 1965. Fraser did his clinical training 1966–1969 in Jamaica and obtained his Bachelor of Medicine and Bachelor of Surgery in UWI Mona in June 1969.

== Medical career ==
In 1973 he returned to the United Kingdom, became a member of the Royal College of Physicians and did clinical research in pharmacology at the Welcome Clinical Research Training Fellowship. Fraser obtained his PHD in Pharmacology in December 1976. Fraser returned to Jamaica in 1977 as a lecturer in medicine and clinical pharmacology at UWI Mona but after 7 months resigned his position due to the political instability there. Returning to Barbados he established a medical practice in neurology while lecturing at the Faculty of Medicine at the University of West Indies, Cave Hill campus.

== Academic career ==
Fraser became a professor of Medicine and Clinical Pharmacology at the University of the West Indies. In 1982 he was appointed scientific secretary of the Commonwealth Caribbean Medical Research Council and held that post for 20 years. Fraser was founding director, Chronic Disease Research Centre, University of the West Indies Cave Hill Campus (1992–2005), and Dean of the Faculty of Medical Sciences in Barbados from 2001 until his retirement in 2010. He was the longest serving public orator at any University of the West Indies campus and he held that position from 1992 to 2010. In 2011 an auditorium was renamed after Fraser, as the Henry Fraser Lecture Theatre at the Cave Hill Campus of the University of West Indies. Upon his retirement he became professor emeritus, at University of the West Indies, Barbados

== Other accomplishments ==
Fraser was appointed as an Independent Senator in the Parliament of Barbados for the years 2013–2018. Fraser was knighted in 2014 for his contribution to the medical community and representation of Barbadian culture and was among the last of the Barbadian knights, as Barbados did away with imperial honours on becoming a republic. He is past President of the Barbados National Trust, chaired the Task Force for the nomination of Historic Bridgetown and its Garrison as a World Heritage site, and was Chairman of the Task Force for Preservation of Barbados's Built Heritage. Fraser is recognized as an architectural historian in Barbados. He is a frequent contributor to the Barbadian press and public speaker on a host of matters of public interest. He wrote a weekly column for The Barbados Advocate newspaper called "Things That Matter" until the Advocate ceased publication in 2023.

== Publications ==
Fraser is the author of over 100 peer-reviewed medical and scientific papers

Fraser, H. S. (n.d.). Management of heart failure in the Caribbean. Therapeutics, 13(1), 33–38.

Alleyne, G. A. O., Fraser, H. S., & Besterman, H. S. (1970). Some effects of metabolic acidosis on carbohydrate metabolism in the rat. Clinical Science, 39, 375–382.

Fraser, H. S., Wilson, W. A., Thomas, & E. J., Sissons, J. G. P. (1978). Dengue shock syndrome in Jamaica. British Medical Journal, 1, 893–894.

Corbin, D. O. C., & Fraser, H. S. (1981). A review of 98 cases of near-drowning at the Queen Elizabeth Hospital, Barbados. West Indian Medical Journal, 30 (22).

Fraser, H. S., Dotson, O. Y., Howard, L., Grell, O. A. C., & Knight, F. (1983). Drug metabolizing capacity in Jamaican cigarette and marijuana smokers and non-smokers. West Indian Medical Journal, 32, 207–211.

Fraser, H. S., & Tibbs, R. C. D. (1983). Variation in response to drugs: Part II environmental and nutritional variables. West Indian Medical Journal, 32, 66–74.

Fraser, H. S., & Hoyos, M. D. (1984). Attitudes to continuing medical education in Barbados. West Indian Medical Journal, 33(Suppl.), 20–21.

Fraser, H. S. (1985). Rational use of essential drugs. World Health Forum, 6, 63–66. Fraser, H. S., & Hoyos, M. D. (1985). Continuing medical education in Barbados. West Indian Medical Journal, 34, 101–108.

Leramo, O. B., G. D., & Fraser, H. S. (1985). Sporadic concurrence of von Recklinghausen's neurofibromatosis and Marfan Syndrome. West Indian Medical Journal, 34, 131–133.

Nicholson, G. D., Fraser, H. S., Hassell, T. A., & Bayley, A. (1985). The management of severe hypertension with minoxidil in a once-a-day treatment schedule. American Journal of Clinical Hypertension, 4, 295–298.

A scoring system for selection of essential drugs. International Journal of Clinical Pharmacology Therapy and Toxicology, 26(3), 122–124. Fraser, H. S. (1991, January 20).

Hennis, A., Corbin, D., & Fraser, H. S. (1992). Focal seizures and non-ketotic hyperglycaemia. Journal of Neurology, Neurosurgery & Psychiatry, 55(3), 195–197.

Foster, C., Rotimi, C., Fraser, H. S., Sundarum, C., Liao, Y., Gibson, E., Holder, Y., Hoyos, M., & Mellanson-King, R. (1993). Hypertension, diabetes, and obesity in Barbados: Findings from a recent population-based survey. Ethnicity & Disease, 3, 404–412.

Rotimi, C. N., Cooper, R. S., Ataman, S. L., Osotimehin, B., Kadiri, S., Muna, W., Kingue, S., Fraser, H. S., & Mcgee, D. (1995). Distribution of anthropometric variables and the prevalence of obesity in populations of West African origin: The international collaborative study on hypertension in blacks (ICSHIB). Obesity Research, 3(Suppl. 2), 95–105.

Fraser, H. S. (1996). Reserpine: A tragic victim of myths, marketing, and fashionable prescribing. Clinical Pharmacology & Therapeutics, 60, 368–373.

Fraser, H. S., & Forrester, T. (1996). (Editorial) The obesity epidemic of the Caribbean. West Indian Medical Journal, 45, 1–2.

Alert, C. V., & Fraser, H. S. (1997). Diabetes in Barbados: Assessment of the CCMRC/Ministry of Health's effort to improve management in the public sector. West Indian Medical Journal, 46(Suppl. 2), 20–31.

Cooper, R., Rotimi, C., Ataman, S., McGee, D., Osotimehin, B., Kadiri, S., Muna, W., Kingue, S., Fraser, H. S., Forrester, T., Bennett, F., & Wilks, R. (1997). The prevalence of hypertension in seven populations of West African origin. American Journal of Public Health, 87(2), 160–168.

Cooper, R., Rotimi, C., Kaufman, J., Owoaje, E., Fraser, H. S., Forrester, T., Wilks, R., Riste, L., & Cruickshank, J. K. (1997). Prevalence of NIDDM among populations of the African diaspora. Diabetes Care, 20(3), 343–348.

=== Books ===
- "A Life in Medicine and the Arts" Autobiography of Henry Fraser, Canoe Press, Kingston Jamaica, 2021. ISBN 9789766530310
- "Treasures of Barbados" by Henry Fraser, MacMillan Caribbean, November 9, 1990. ISBN 0333533690
- "Historic Houses of Barbados" by Henry Fraser, Barbados National Trust, Art Heritage Publications, 1986. ISBN 9768025018
- "Barbados Chattel Houses" by Bob and Henry Fraser, Toute Bagai Publishing, 2011 ISBN 976823329X
- "Barbados: Heritage in Pictures" by Henry Fraser, Phoenix Carib Limited, 2019 ISBN 0957461550
- "Did You Know People, Places and Untold Stories of Historic Barbados" by Henry Fraser, Miller Publishing Company Limited, Barbados, 2021. ISBN 978-976-96209-5-7
- "Did You Know People, Places and Untold Stories of Historic Barbados Volume 2" by Henry Fraser, Miller Publishing Company Limited, Barbados, 2023. ISBN 978-976-9644830
- "The Barbados-Carolina Connection" by Warren Alleyne and Henry Fraser. London: Macmillan Caribbean, 1988. ISBN 0333473450
- "100 Years of Sailing: The Barbados Yacht Club 1924–2024 building a legacy together" Henry Fraser major contributor
