= Penny Clark =

British sailor

Penny Joanna Clark (Nee Mountford) (born 7 May 1975) is a British sailor who competed in the 2008 Summer Olympics.

== Sailing ==
Born in Wolverhampton and began sailing aged four at the Himley Hall Sailing Club and later moved to Lee-on-the-Solent, Hampshire. Where she followed the pathway and represented Great Britain three time at 1990, 1991 and 1992 ISAF Youth Sailing World Championships. She then went on to participate at the challenging 2008 Olympic Games held in difficult, tricky conditions.

== Personal Life & Military Service ==
She studied at Southampton Univercity as part of the Royal Navy's graduate plan. She joined the Navy while campaigning for the Olympics.

In 2006 she married Royal Navy officer Russell Clark although they actually met through sailing on the Topper circuit in the 1980s. Russ had been partially involved in coaching Penny to the Olympics and they carry on recreational sailing together competing and coming 2nd at the 2019 Fireball World Championship.
