= Shane Atwell =

Barbadian sailor (1970–2012)

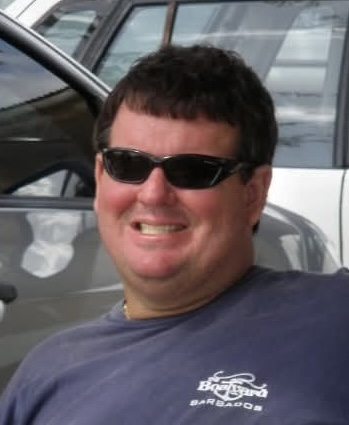

Personal information
- Nationality: Barbadian
- Born: 18 May 1970
- Died: 8 February 2012 (aged 41)

Sport
- Sport: Sailing
- Club: Barbados Yacht Club

Shane Atwell (18 May 1970 – 8 February 2012) was a Barbadian sailor. He competed in the Finn event at the 1988 Summer Olympics.
