= Barbados Yacht Club =

Yacht club

- Short name: BYC
- Founded: 26 December 1924
- Location: St. Michael, Barbados
- Commodore: Edward Clarke

The Barbados Yacht Club was established in 1924 with a primary focus of promoting sailing on the island of Barbados. In 1932 it was granted a Royal Warrant by King George V to become the Royal Barbados Yacht Club. In 1967 it lost the use of the Royal honorific and reverted to the Barbados Yacht Club shortly after Barbados gained independence from the United Kingdom in 1966.

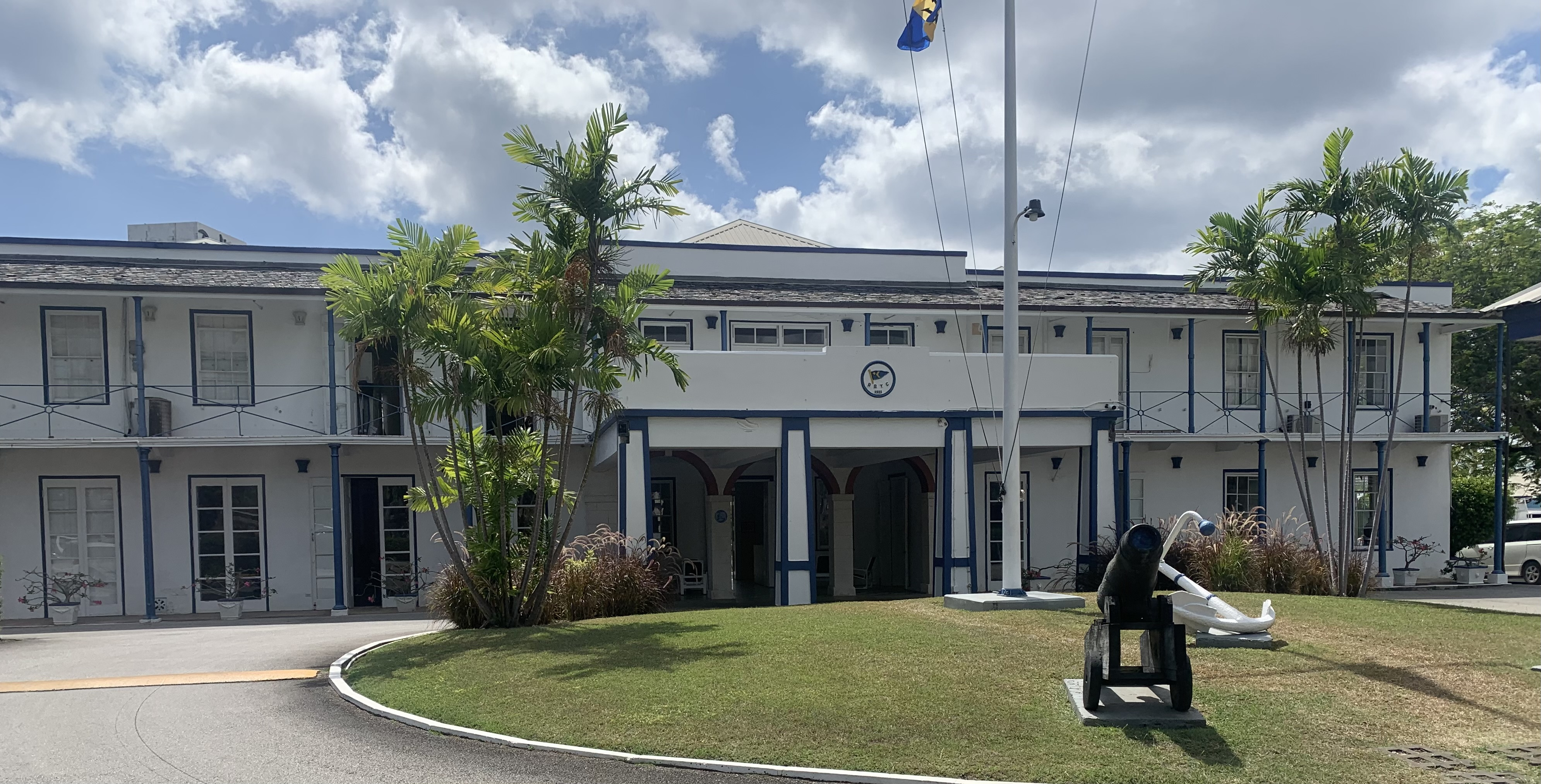
Shot Hall

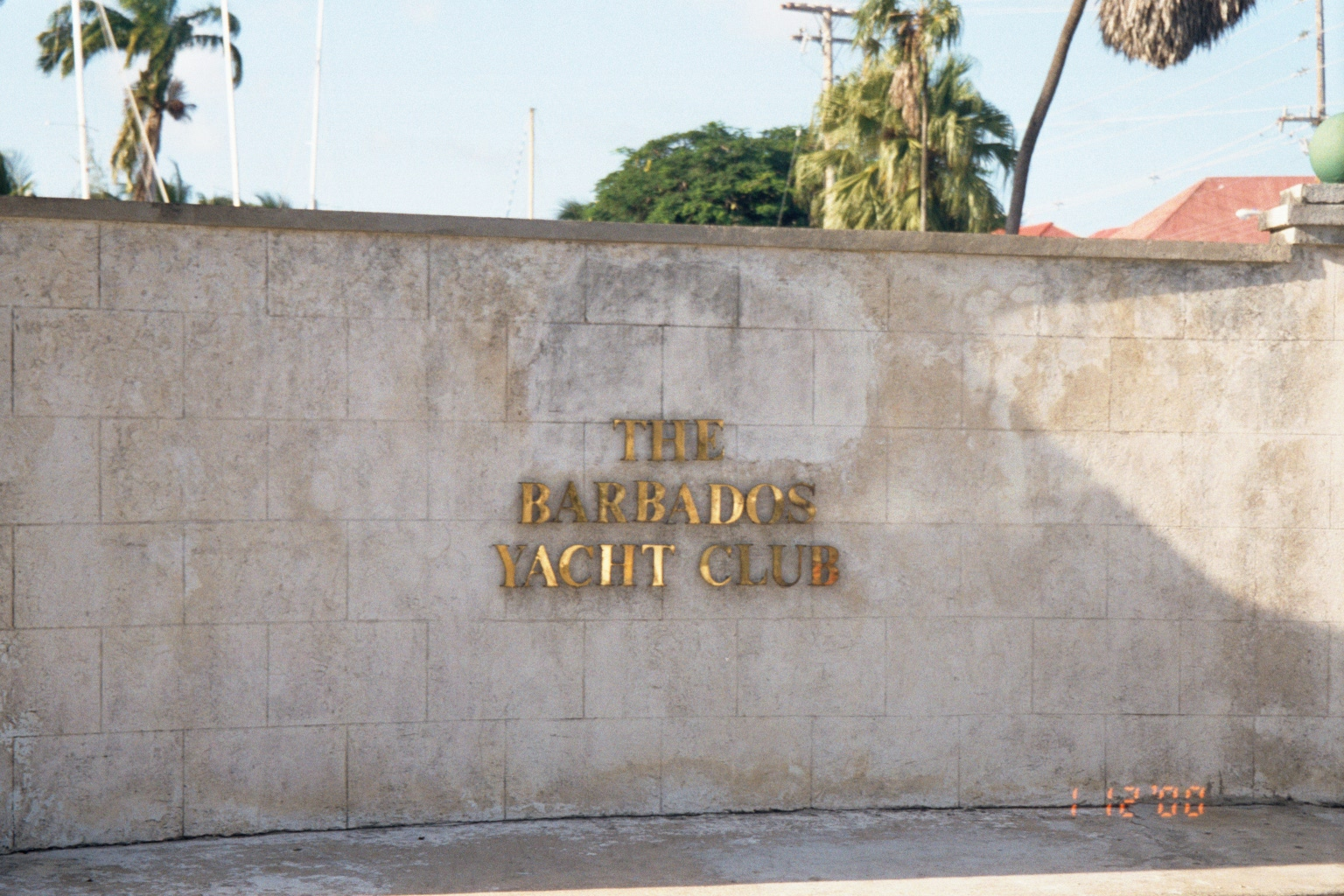
Barbados Yacht Club entrance.

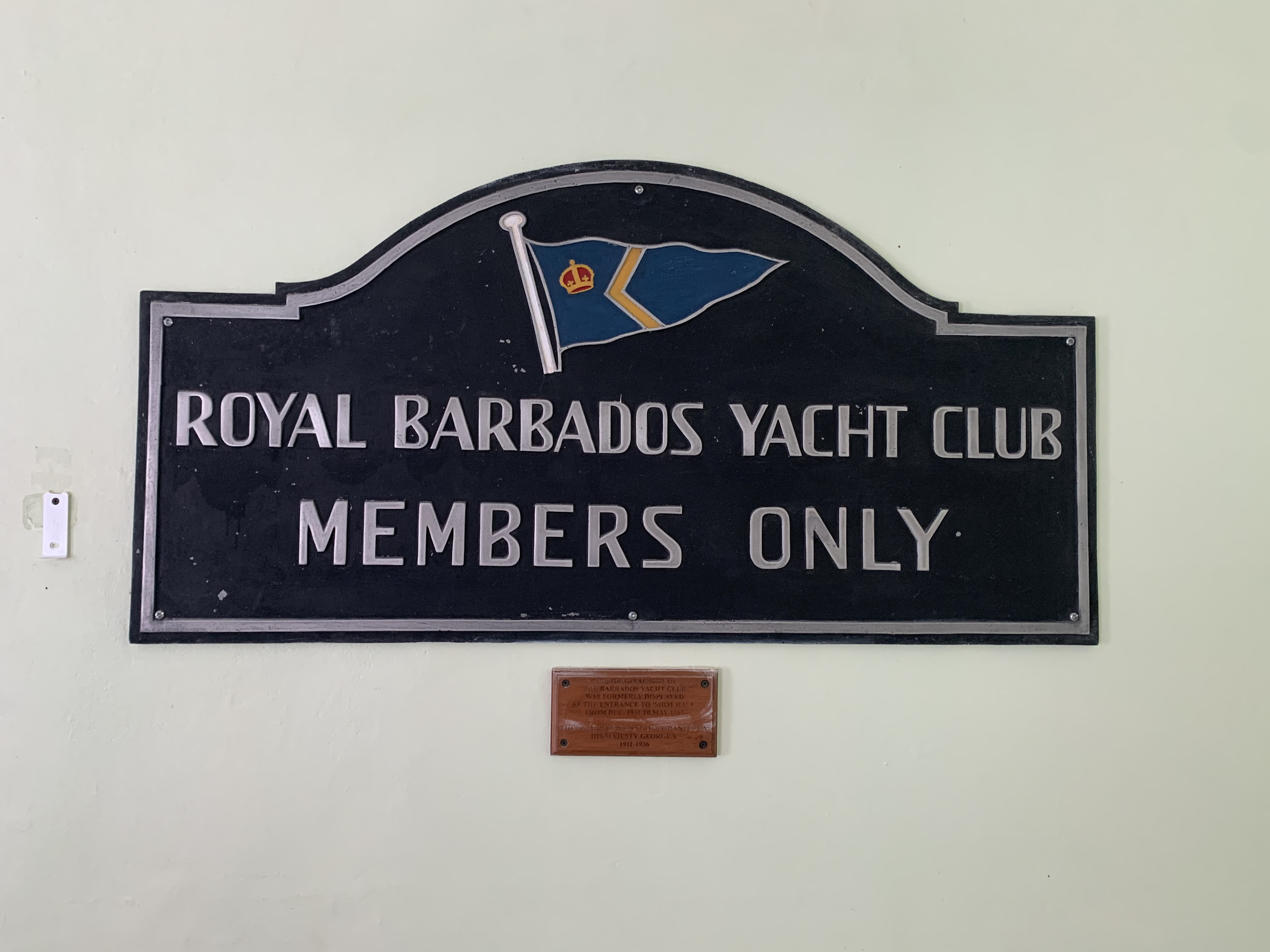
Royal Barbados Yacht Club.

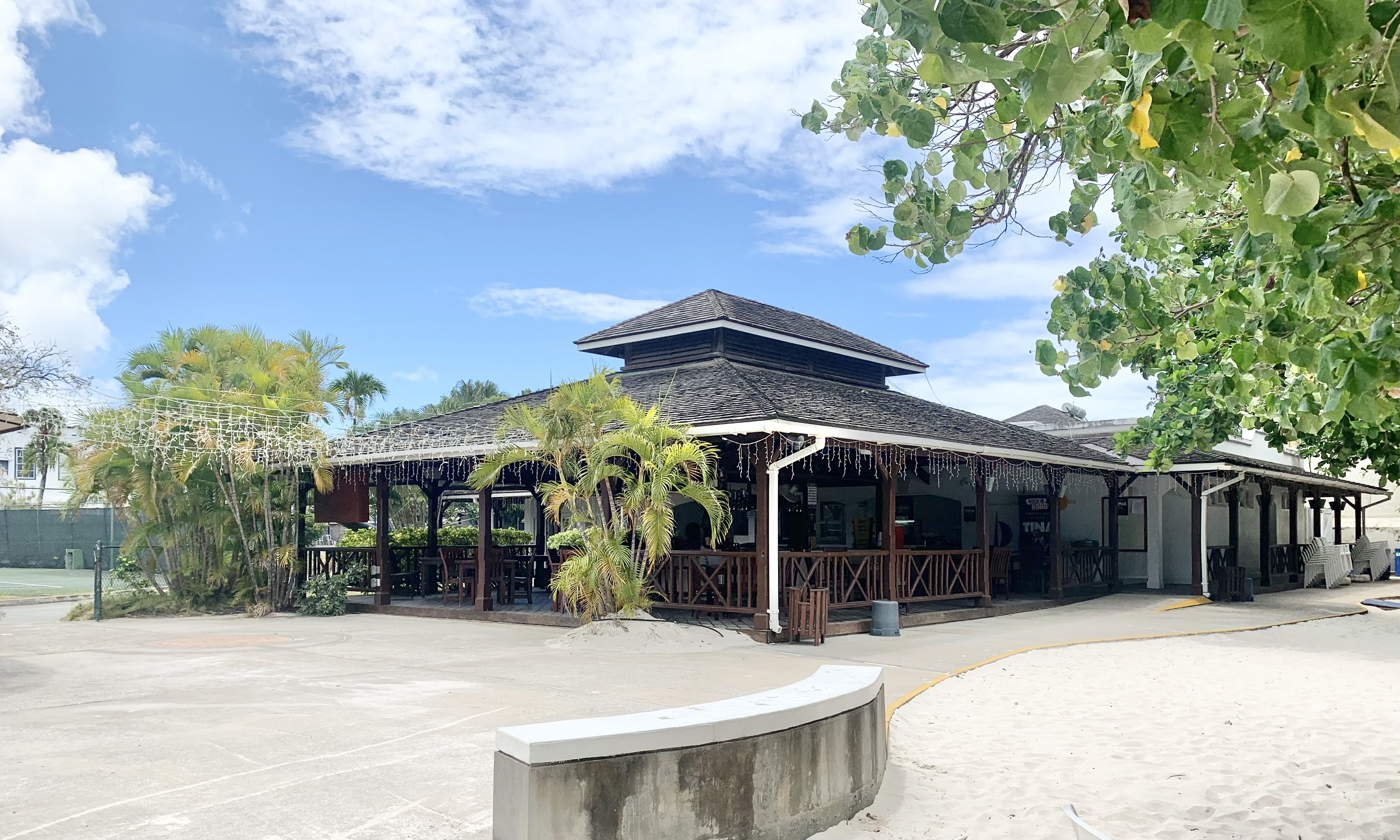
Beach Bar.

== Shot Hall ==
The Club's Clubhouse, originally called Shot Hall, is located on Carlisle Bay. It is a classic Regency era house and was erected in 1810 It was originally the private residence of the Officer Commanding the West Indies Company of the Royal Engineers of the British Army. The first Commanding Royal Engineer who occupied Shot Hall was Brigadier-General Sir Charles Shipley.

The origin of the name Shot Hall is unclear but probably derives from two buildings originally located to the north of the Hall described in an 1832 British garrison plan as "Artillery Stores" i.e. artillery shot was stored on the grounds. After the departure of British Forces from Barbados in 1905-6 the Hall became the residence of Captain W.H.Owen the Marine Superintendent of the Royal Mail Steam Packet Company which owned the property. The building was operated as the Royal Hotel - Barbados from 1911-1918

Subsequent occupants of the Hall included C. Ludlow Livingston the United States Consul (1918-1920), Lt Colonel H. I. F. Yates a British Union Oil Company Executive (1921-1923) and then by a Barbadian businessman Harold Wright. The Club was in occupation of the Hall in 1926. The Hall underwent extensive structural alteration in or around 1936 with the object of improving the function of the building as a club house. A porte-cochere was built on the east side of the Hall in the early 1950's over the entrance to the clubhouse providing shelter to members arriving by automobile from inclement weather.

== Club Amenities and Activities ==
Over the years there have been different sailboat classes raced at the Club including the Star (keelboat), Fireball (dinghy) and J24 Classes

The Club has 4 tennis courts, a pickleball court, dining facilities and a beach bar. The beach bar was constructed in 2006.

In 2014 a new building was constructed containing new facilities including a gym for members use on the south side of the property next to the beach bar.

Most members boats are stored on land and launched and hauled out on the beach. Some member yachts are on moorings in Carlisle Bay. There are no dockage facilities.

== Militaria on Club Grounds ==
At the Club’s driveway entrance gate there are 4 columns in the walls surmounted by 24 pound cannonballs painted blue.

Adjacent to the Beach Bar is a mounted eighteenth century British 24-pounder long gun bearing the royal cypher of King George II of Great Britain. The cannon was found during excavations of the Eastern Boat Dock in the Club’s boat yard in 2012. The cannon was installed in memory of a club member Major Mike Hartland.

To the east of the clubhouse in the driveway turning circle are 2 19th century mounted 24 pounder carronade found during demolition and excavation of a Royal Navy building to the northeast of Shot Hall.

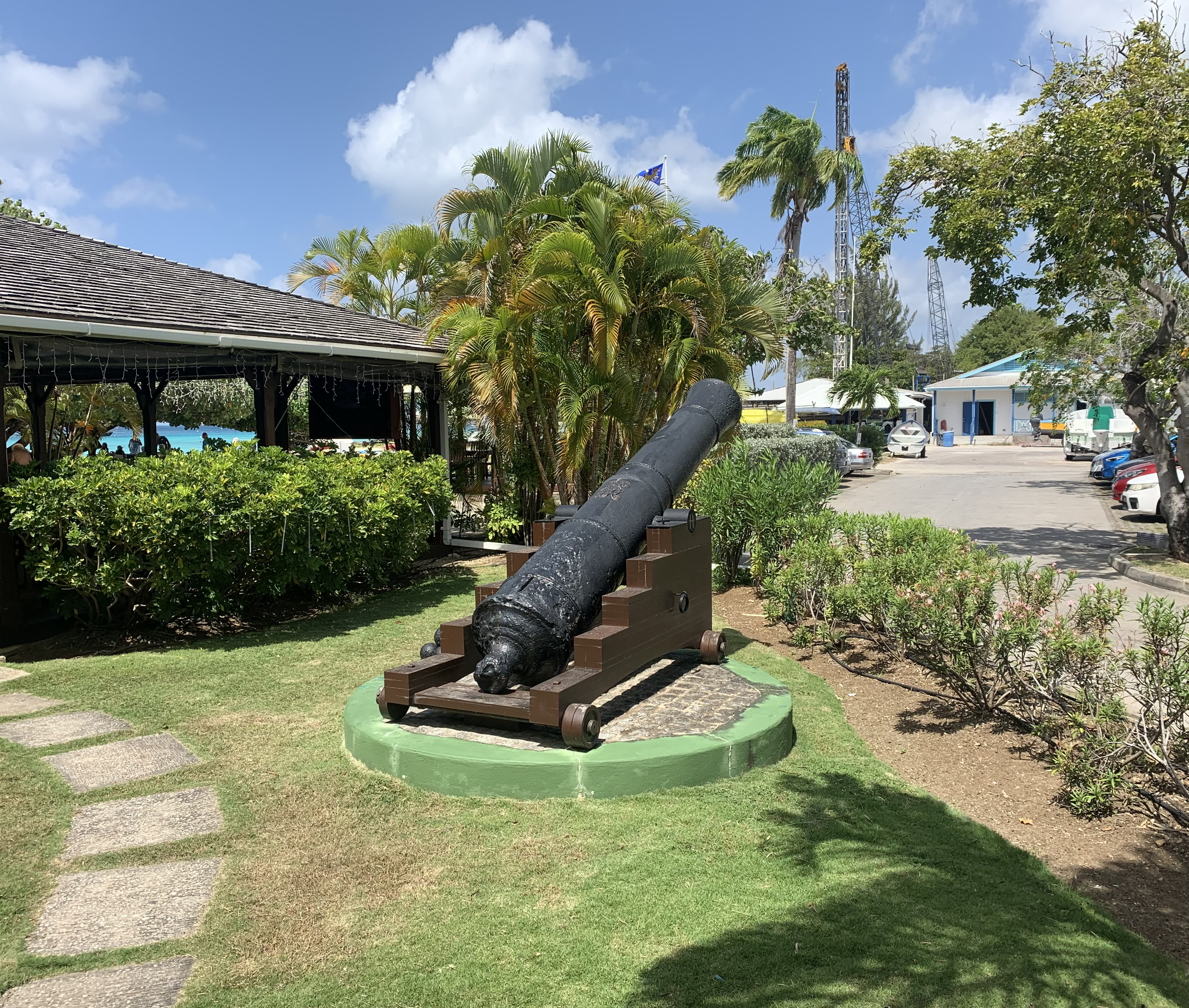
King George II 24 pounder long gun

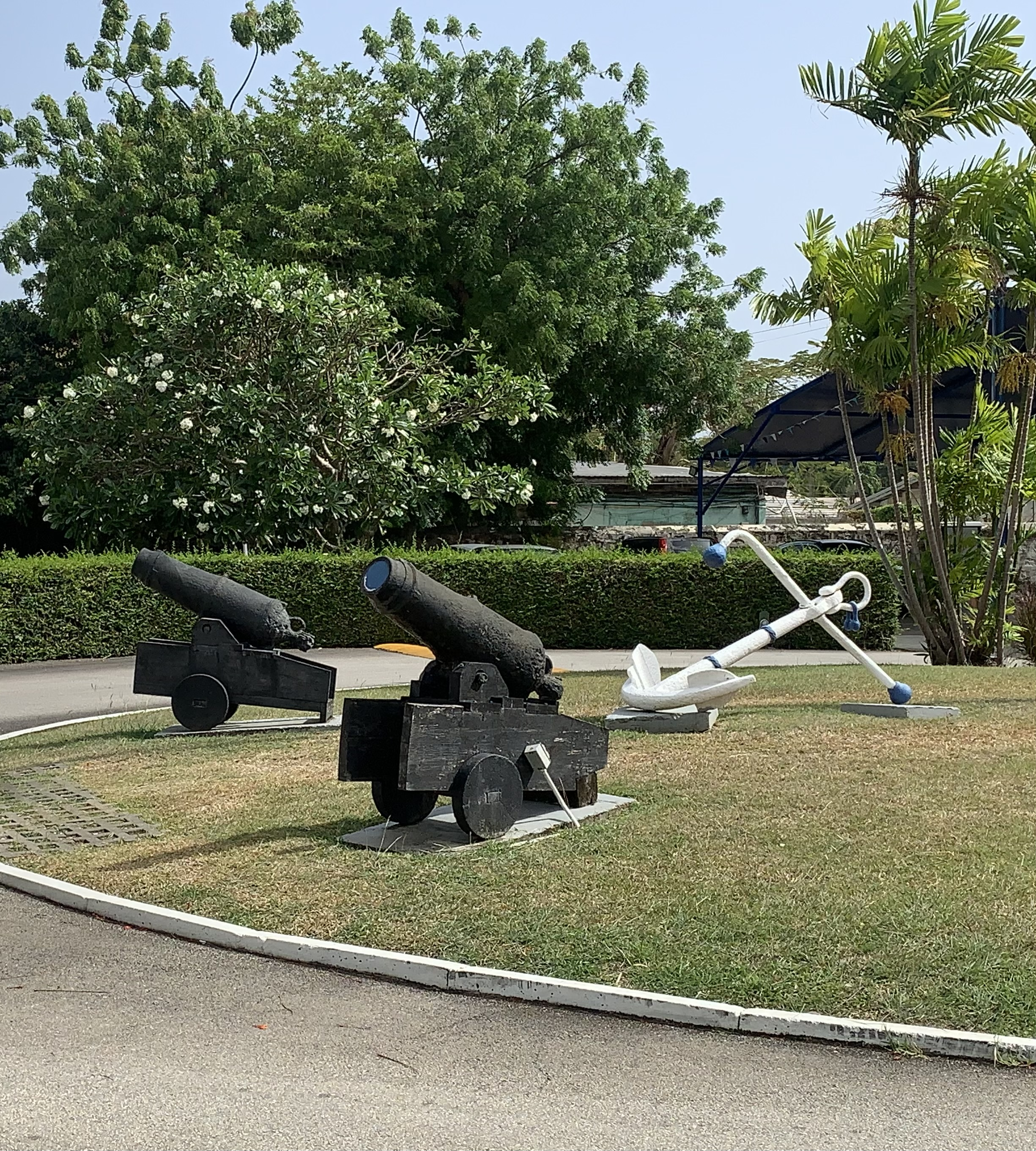
Carronades in front turning circle

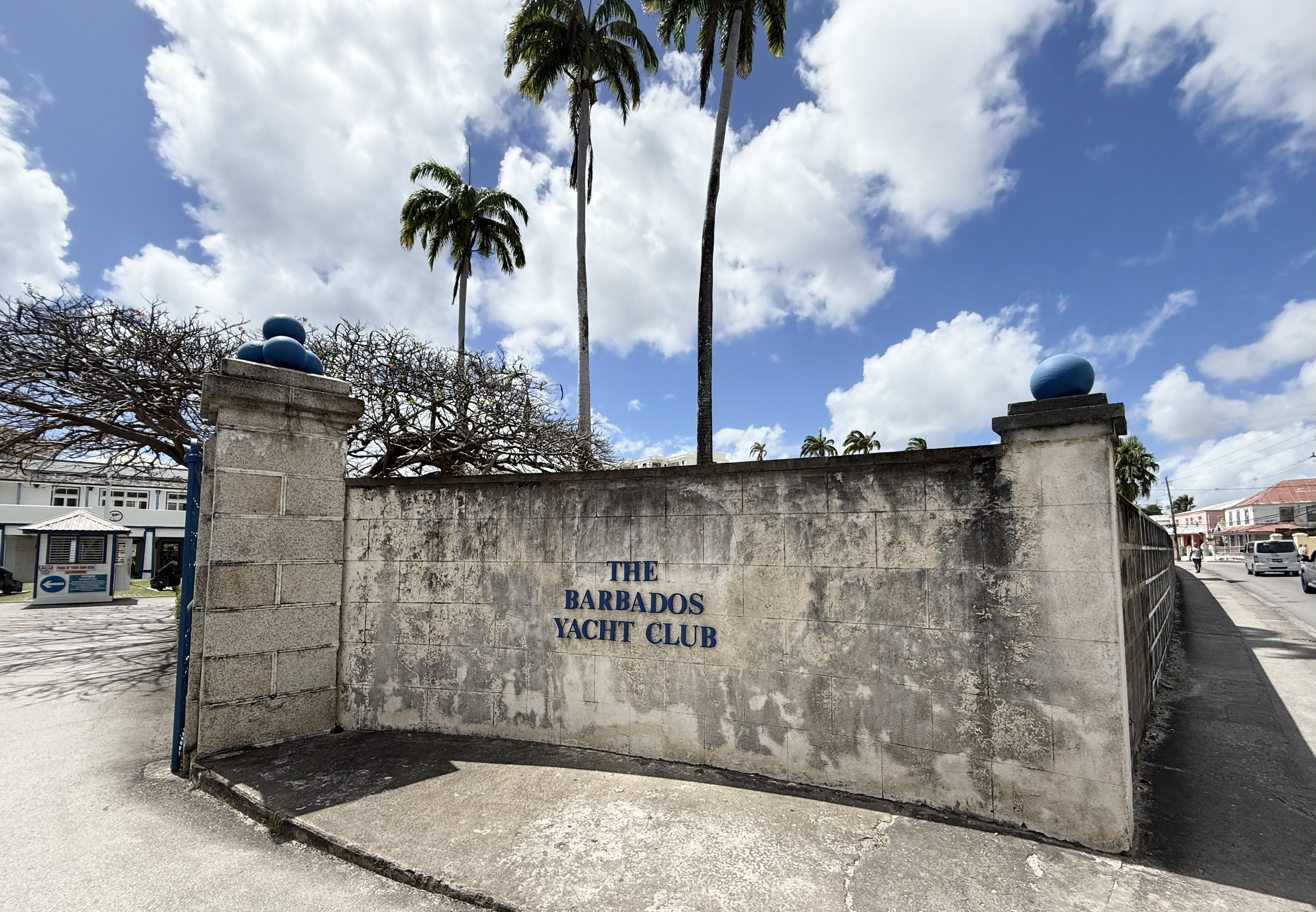
Cannonball finials at entrance gate

== Club Burgee ==
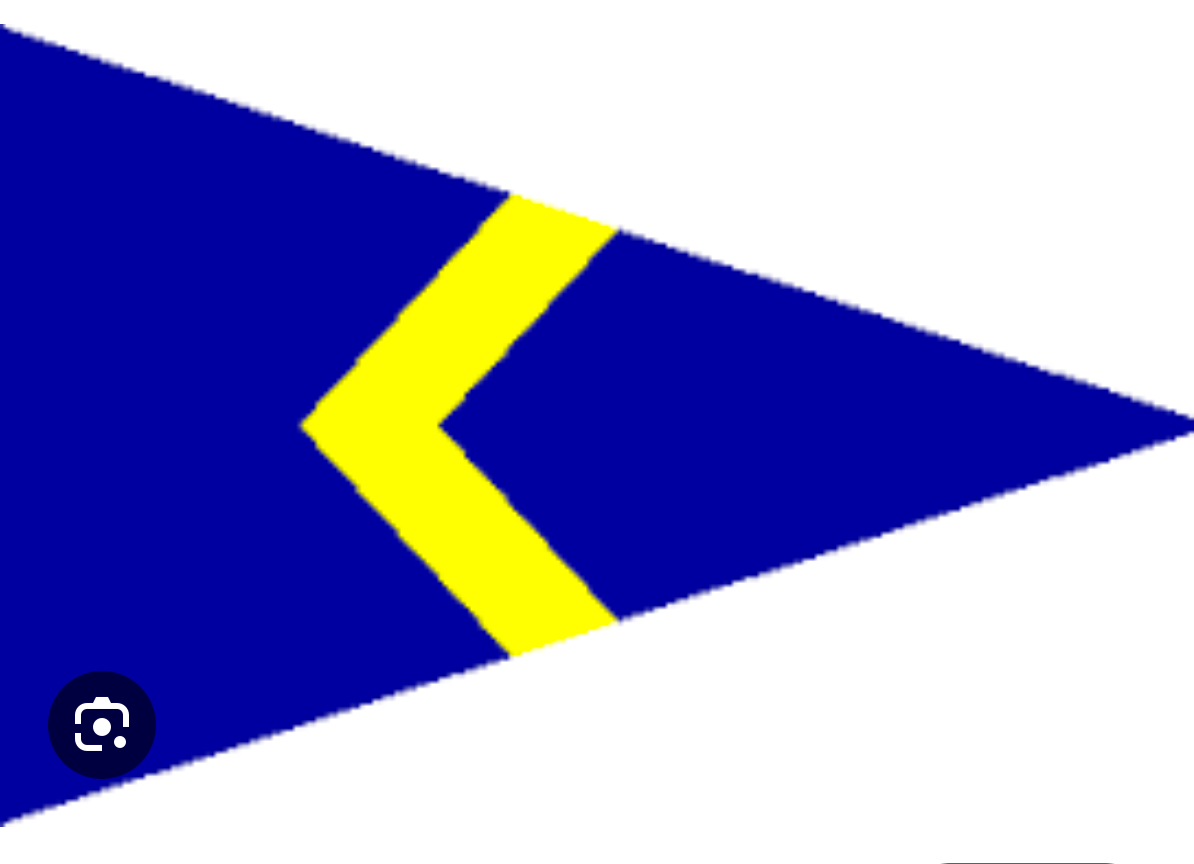
Barbados Yacht Club Burgee 1924-1932

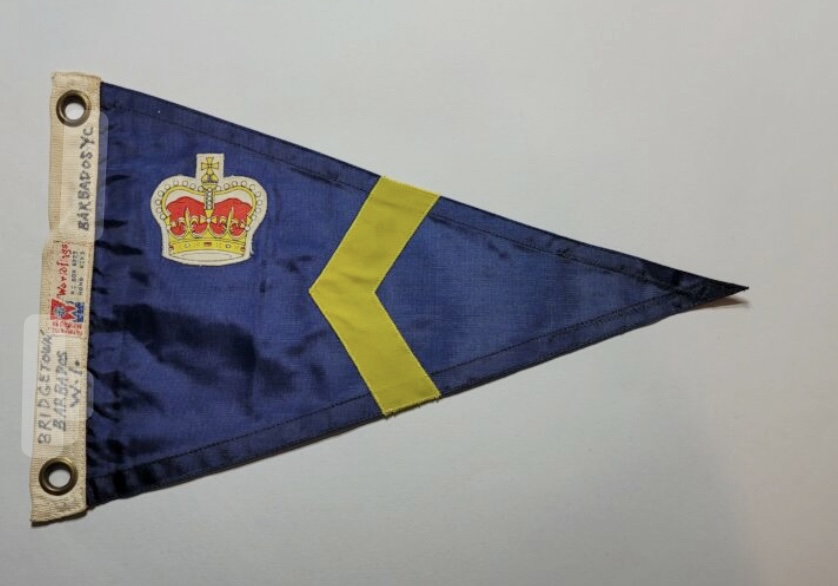
Royal Barbados Yacht Club Burgee 1932-1991

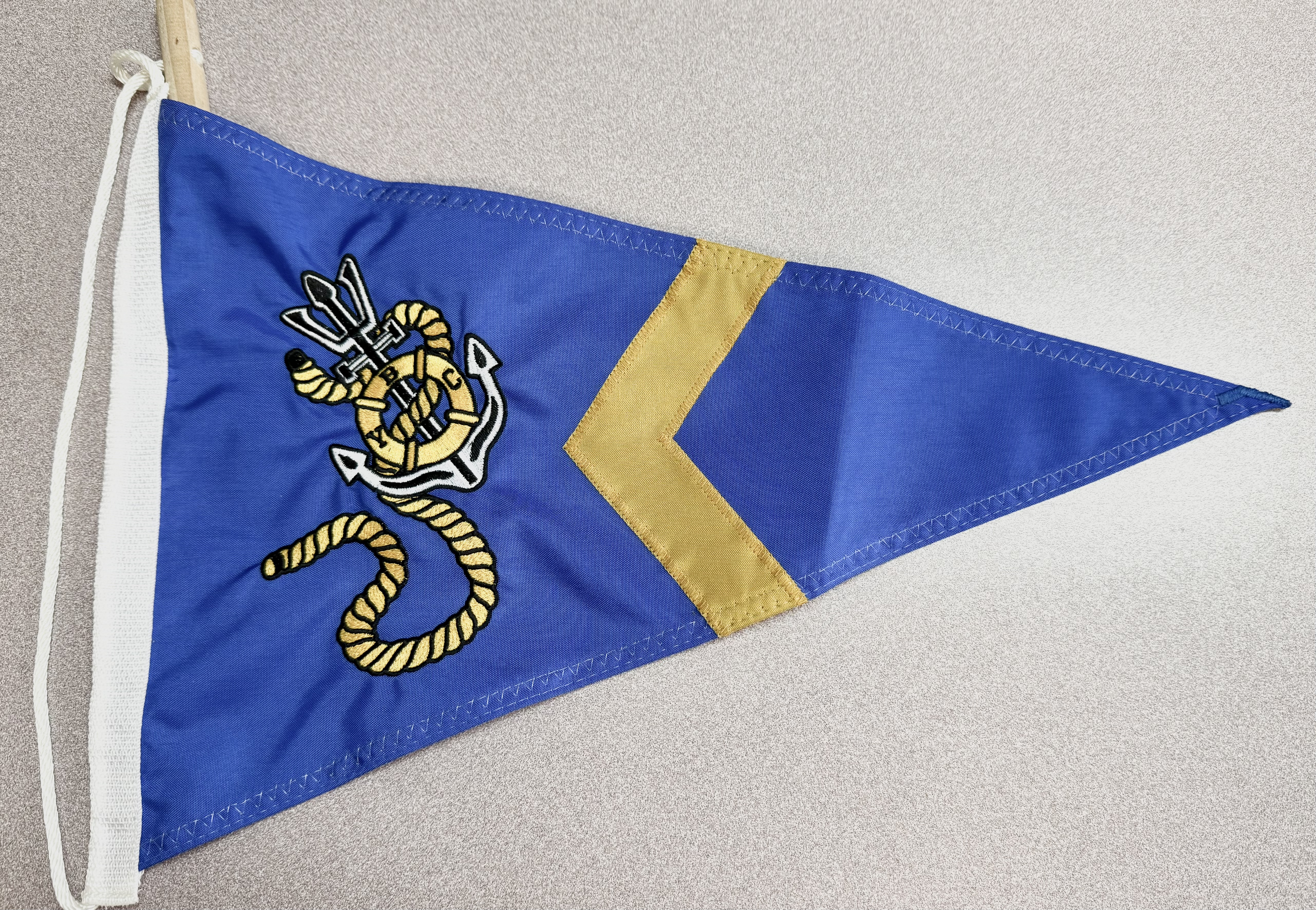
Barbados Yacht Club Burgee post 1991

At the time of the Club's founding in 1924 a Burgee was adopted which comprised a 2:3 blue triangle with a yellow hoistward chevron A burgee with an insignia featuring a Royal Coronet, a flying fish and a chevron was approved by King George V in 1932 and used by the club until 1967. In 1932 the Club also applied to the British Admiralty for permission for Club members to fly a Blue Ensign defaced with badge of the colony of Barbados. The Admiralty refused the application that same year because of the low tonnage, and level of activity, of Club yachts. In 1991 the club changed the burgee from that used since 1932 to a new design approved by the Cabinet Office of the Government of Barbados.

== Notable Members ==
Shane Atwell - olympic sailor

Angus Edghill - olympic swimmer

Sir Henry Fraser (physician) KA - academic, historian and author

Major Michael Hartland - officer of Barbados Defence Force and author

Ralph L. Johnson GCM - industrialist and sportsman

Mary S. Lovell - author

== Criticism and Controversy ==
In 2016, Japanese Ambassador to Barbados, Teruhiko Shinada described the Barbados Yacht Club as a symbol of colonial exclusivity. He observed that “almost everyone was caucasian” while “all the waiters were Black.”

Shinada noted that prior to independence in 1966, an unwritten rule barred people of color from joining the club. He argued in 2016 that the membership process (requiring recommendations, interviews, and votes) continued to limit diversity, and that the club remained a “legacy of colonialism” in Barbados.

In February 2024 the Club's membership elected a black Commodore as its leader Peter Thompson.

In January 2026, workers at the Barbados Yacht Club halted operations in protest over unpaid wages, salaries, and allowances owed for more than three weeks. The Barbados Workers’ Union announced that employees would not return until all outstanding payments were made.
