= Phuket King's Cup Regatta =

The Phuket King's Cup Regatta (PKCR) is a one-week event held annually in Phuket, Thailand. The regatta was inaugurated in 1987 to celebrate the 60th birthday of the King of Thailand. The event has been held every year since during the first week of December. With royal patronage, the regatta is organised by the Phuket King's Cup Regatta Organizing Committee under the auspices of the Royal Varuna Yacht Club (RVYC), in conjunction with the Yacht Racing Association of Thailand, the Royal Thai Navy (RTN), and Phuket Province. In 2016 the event will be held from 3–10 December.

== Origins ==
In 1986, a number of Thailand's yachting fraternity met to discuss what they could do as a tribute to the king on the occasion of his forthcoming fifth cycle, or 60th birthday the following year, on 5 December 1987. It was decided to hold a regatta in Phuket, the first ever held in the Andaman Sea.

The inaugural regatta was held in 1987. The regatta began with a mixture of keelboats, catamarans, Lasers, and even windsurfers. More recently the regatta has become a big boat event, attracting keelboats and ocean-going catamaran teams from around the world. As a fixture on the Asian yachting circuit, the regatta annually features upwards of 90 boats (record of 103 in 2007) and 2,000 sailors, ranging from the Formula One of the sea lanes, the racing class, to live-aboard ocean cruisers, multihulls, and classics.

== Patrons ==
The regatta is sailed under the authority of RVYC, with extensive logistical help from both the Royal Thai Navy and the Yacht Racing Association of Thailand (YRAT).

== The King's Cup trophy ==
The Phuket King's Cup Regatta trophy was designed by architect and entrepreneur ML Tridhosyuth Devakul. As former King Bhumipol Adulyadej was the ninth King of the Chakri Dynasty and a skilled sailor and boating enthusiast, sailing, and the number nine, provide the themes that define the trophy.
