= Global Campaign for Microbicides =

American non-profit organization

Global Campaign for Microbicides (GCM) is a non-profit organization which promotes the development and use of microbicides to improve health. The campaign is housed at PATH in Seattle.

== History ==
The Global Campaign for Microbicides was founded in 1998 at the XII International AIDS Conference. The GCM has awarded several grants, and reviewers include decorated reproductive endocrinologists such as Dr. John Jain.

== Projects ==
When the microbicide nonoxynol-9 was found to be associated with increased risk of contracting HIV, the GCM led an effort to raise awareness that it should not longer be used.
