= Angus Edghill =

Barbadian swimmer (1946–2025)

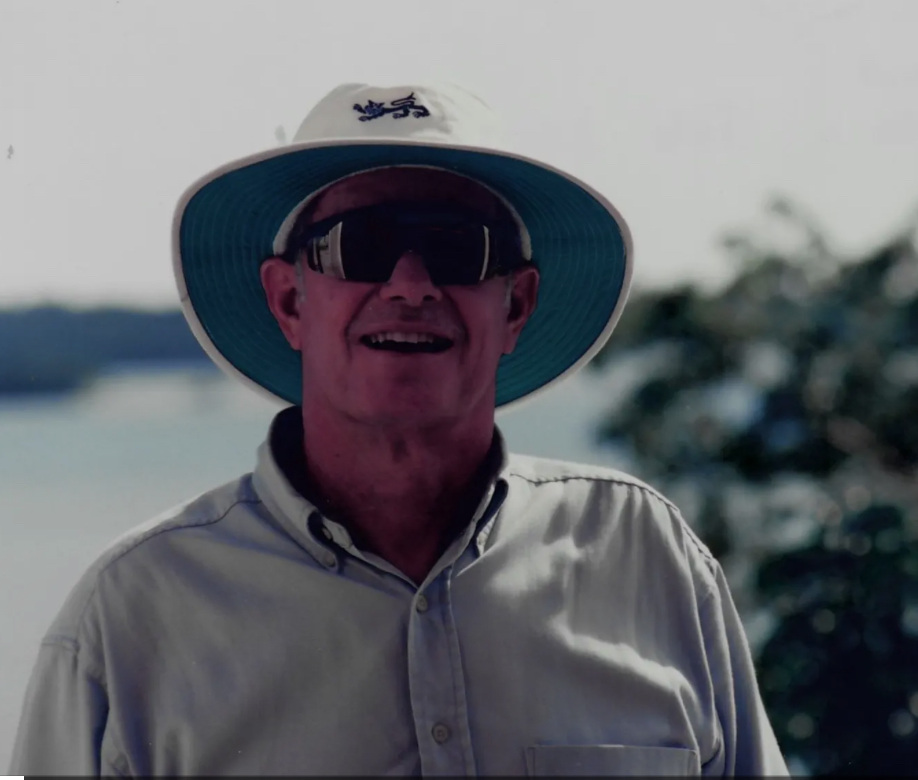

Personal information
- Nationality: Barbadian
- Born: 15 February 1946 Scotland
- Died: 15 March 2025 (aged 79) Barbados

Sport
- Sport: Swimming
- Club: Barbados Yacht Club

Angus Edghill (15 February 1946 – 18 March 2025) was a Barbadian swimmer.

== Swimming career ==
When attending the University of Manitoba as an engineering student he was on the Manitoba Bisons swimming team. He competed in two events at the 1968 Summer Olympics. Edghill was the lone swimmer on Barbados’ 10-member team when the country made its debut at the Olympics. In Masters’ swimming, Edghill was a world record holder in several events, including the 400m, 800m, and 1500m (long course) freestyle in the 45-49 age group and the 400m and 800m short course freestyle records in the 50-54 age group.

== Business and professional career ==
Edghill was a civil engineer. He and his cousin The Most Honourable Richard Edghill FB played a crucial role in advancing swimming in Barbados through the construction of the Barbados Aquatic Centre at the Garfield Sobers Sports Complex in Wildey. The national pool features a 50m Olympic-size pool vital for training and international competitions. At the time of his death he was a managing director of Caribbean Consultants Limited a construction company founded in 1973 by Angus and Richard Edghill. The company under the Edghills' leadership built bridges, warehouses, hotels and office buildings in Barbados and throughout the Caribbean. One of the most prominent buildings constructed by them is the Embassy of the United States of America in Bridgetown, Barbados.

In March of 2026 after his death, Edghill's family, and that of his cousin Richard, established the Angus Edghill Scholarship Fund which provides financial scholarships to Barbadians who are pursuing studies in any recognized engineering discipline.
