= Royal Varuna Yacht Club =

Boating association in Thailand

Coordinates: 12°54′45″N 100°51′45″E

- Burgee
- Short name: RVYC
- Founded: 1957 (69 years ago)
- Location: 286 Moo 12 Phatumnak Rd; Chonburi 20150 Thailand
- Commodore: Koravic Bhanubandh Na Ayudhaya, 2022
- Website: www.varuna.org

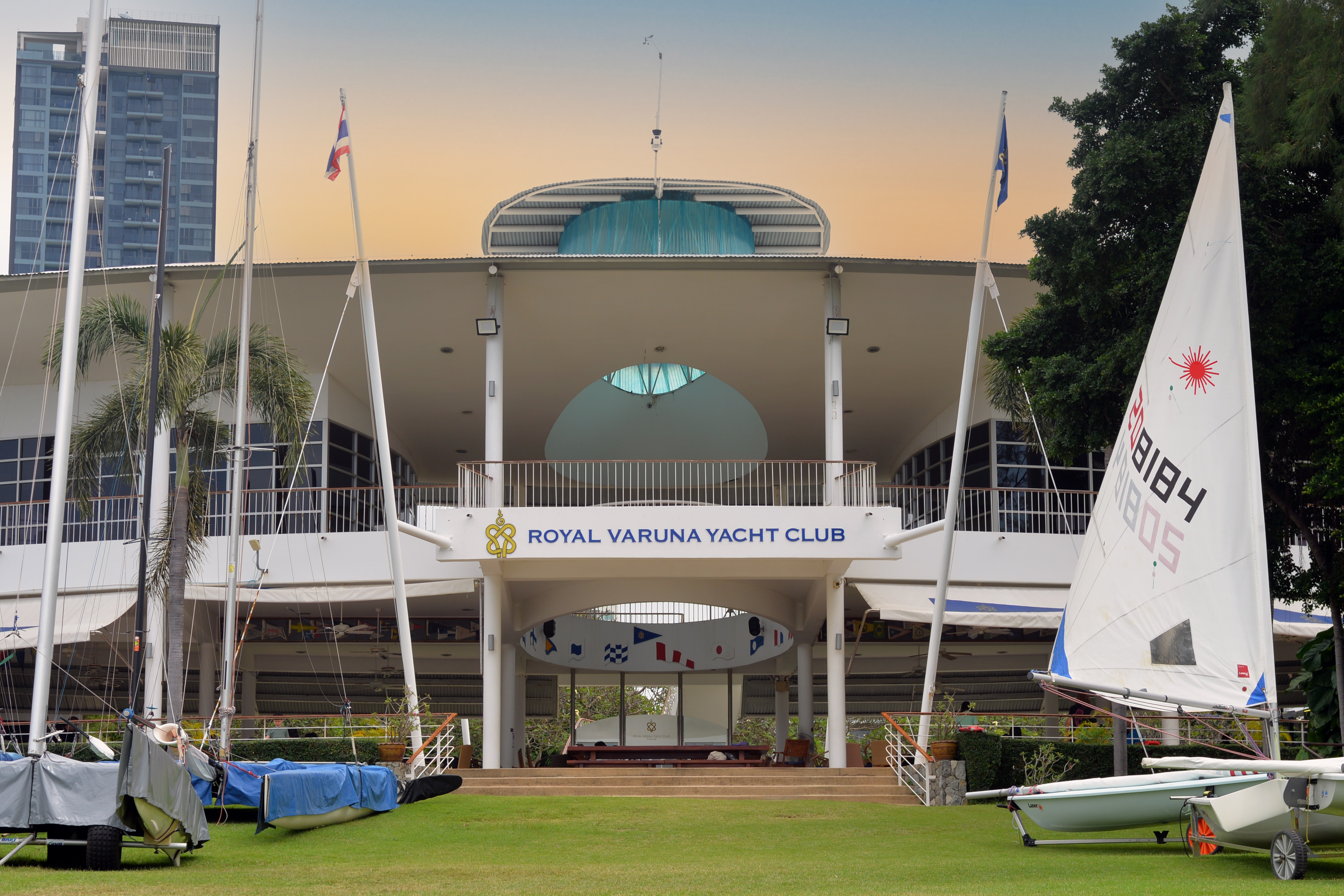
Royal Varuna Yacht Club

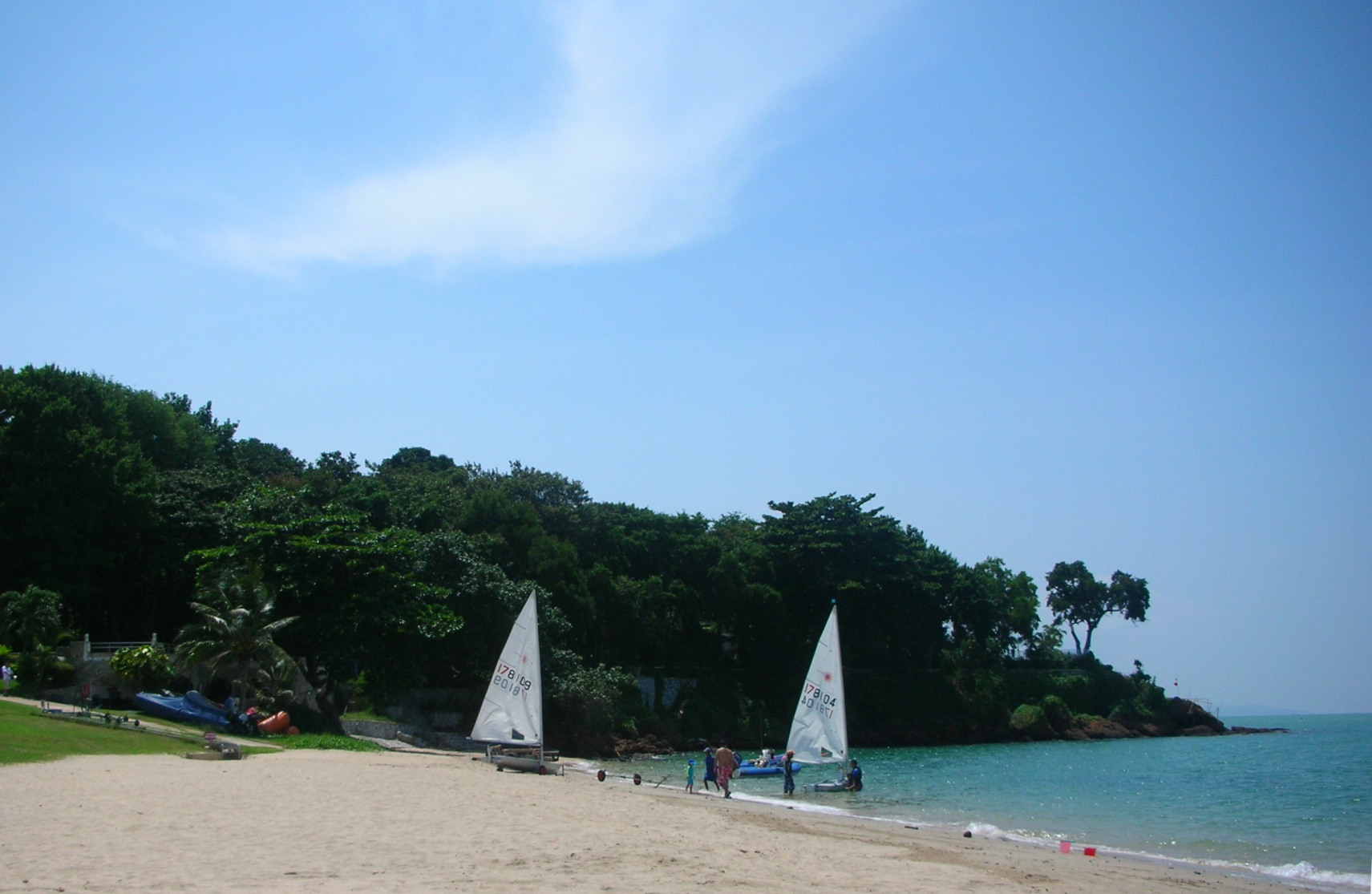
Beach near RVYC

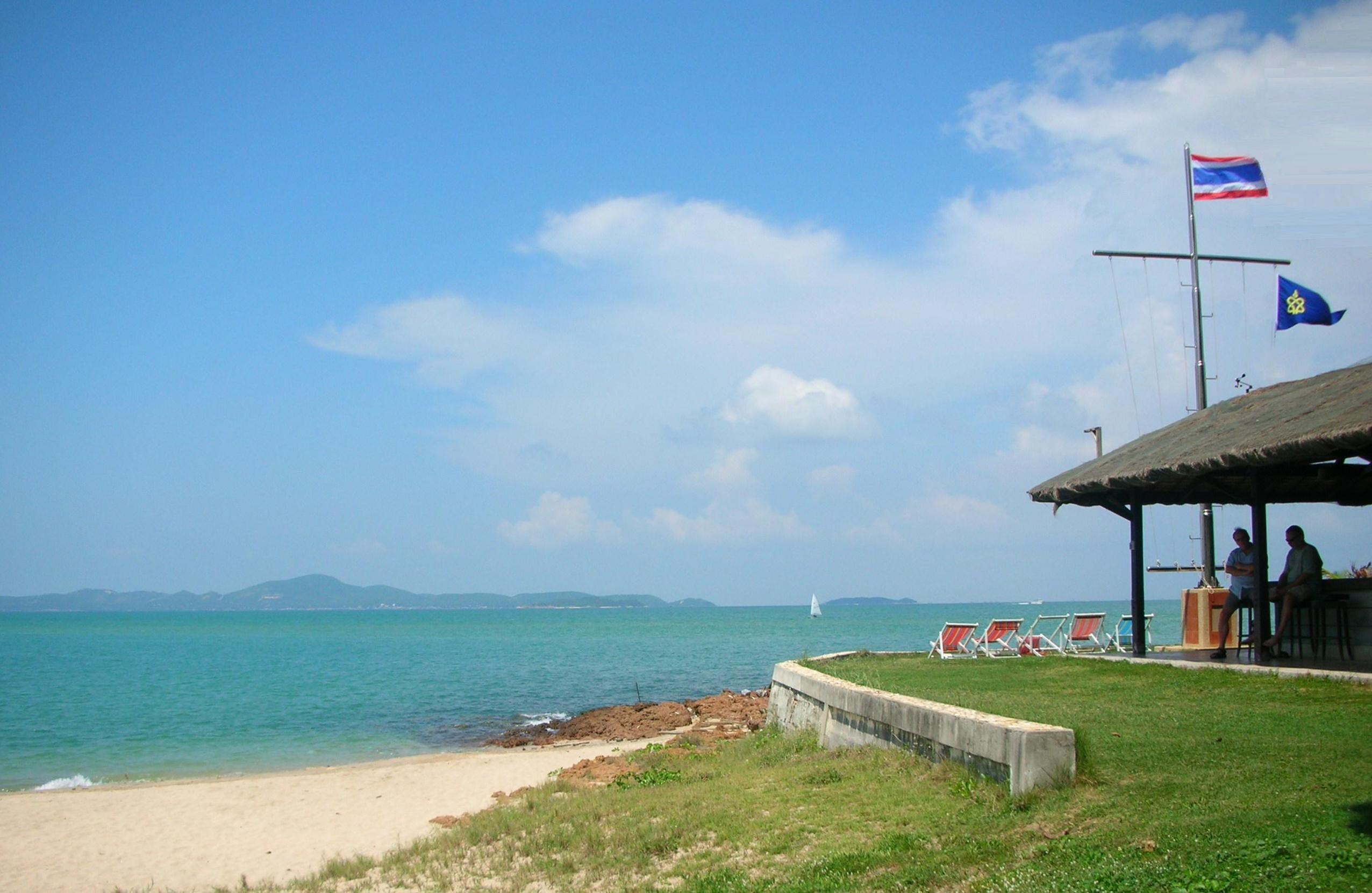
Beach shack with Ko Lan in the distance

The Royal Varuna Yacht Club (RVYC) (Thai: สมาคมสโมสรราชวรุณในพระบรมราชูปถัมภ์) is a yacht club near Pattaya, a popular tourist destination in Thailand. This club is named after Varuna (IAST: varuṇa), the Vedic divinity that rules the oceans.

== History ==
The history of RVYC is the history of yacht-racing, sailing, and cruising in Thailand. One of RVYC's co-founders, Prince Bhisatej Rajani, could be regarded as the godfather of sailing in Thailand. His contributions go well beyond the founding of RVYC, for it was he who introduced the king to dinghy sailing.

Prince Bhisatej was one of ten persons who answered Walter Meyer's advertisement in the Bangkok Post in April, 1957, seeking boating friends to form a boating club. An Australian, an Italian, two Swiss, and a Thai met at the Cosmopolitan Restaurant in Bangkok. By the end of that lunch, Prince Bhisatej, Sid Watkins, Robert (Rachiman) Gintzburger, Roberto Maestrini, and Walter Meyer launched the Varuna Marine Club, with the aim of promoting all water sports, including power-boating, water-skiing, scuba diving, sailing, cruising, and yacht-racing. The Varuna Marine Club was officially opened on the weekend of 15–16 February 1958.

The RVYC was established in 1957 as the Varuna Marine Club. Prince Bhisadej was in charge of the sailing programme and Swiss resident Walter Meyer was the first flag commodore. The club was bestowed royal patronage (ในพระบรมราชูปถัมภ์) by the King of Thailand on April 26, 1965, becoming the "Royal Varuna Yacht Club".

The Royal Varuna is a well-equipped sailing club outside Pattaya town on a secluded public beach limited by rocky cliffs on one side. The club's facilities include boat storage, boat repair, parking, a beach bar and a swimming pool. It also rents accommodation with rooms of varying standard.

The club's new premises formally opened in 2003. Its main feature is a wide reception area, the "Club House", where most socializing and official business takes place. There is a restaurant, cafeteria, and bar in the facility. Next to the Club House is a "Kid's Club" for children. The second floor of the Club House has offices and a television room.

== Royal patronage ==
In March 1965, the Varuna Marine Club membership was invited to the king's own newly established Royal Chitralada Yacht Squadron at the Klai Kangwon Palace in Hua Hin. After the races, Prince Bhisatej announced that the king had extended royal patronage to the Varuna Marine Club. A month later, on 26 April 1965, the Varuna Marine Club become the Royal Varuna Yacht Club. On 14 September 1968, the king, accompanied by the queen, the crown prince, and princesses, officially inaugurated the Royal Varuna Yacht Club.

== Activities ==
Royal Varuna is an internationally recognized yacht club that regularly organizes sailing events. Regattas occur most weekends and there are annual competitions that include competitors from other parts of Asia. It is a member of the Yacht Racing Association of Thailand (YRAT). It is a principal sponsor of the Phuket King's Cup Regatta.

It is possible to rent boats at the RVYC, and instructional courses in Optimist and Laser are available at the club, especially during school holidays.
