= Mossel Bay Yacht and Boat Club =

Coordinates: 34°10′45″S 22°08′26″E

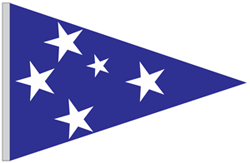
Burgee of the Mossel Bay Yacht & Boat Club.

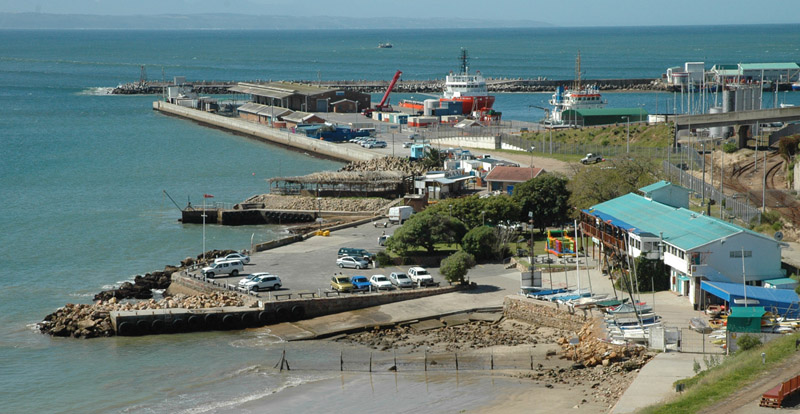
View of the Mossel Bay Yacht and Boat Club and harbor.

Mossel Bay Yacht and Boat Club (abb: MBYBC)/Mosselbaai Seiljag- en Bootklub (Afrikaans) was a yacht club in South Africa. Established in 1956, it was located in the harbour city of Mossel Bay on the Garden Route in the Western Cape Province.

Club activities included yachting, boating, diving, rowing, and social events.

== History ==
Melville Stephens, a keen sailor, established in the club (initially just the 'Mossel Bay Yacht Club') in 1956 as a space for recreational sailors and enthusiasts to have ready access to sailing and social facilities; a launching ramp was constructed for this purpose.

In 1976, to incorporate growing interest in deep sea angling, the club's name changed to the 'Mossel Bay Yacht and Boat Club'.

To celebrate the MBYBC's 50th anniversary, club member Dr. Loftus Heunis wrote Highlights from a Journey Through Time to record the club's history.

In August 2011, the club hosted the L26 class inter-club Lipton Sailing Cup.

Over time the club's facilities grew in size. By 2019, the club building housed an office, a manager's flat, toilets and showers, a sail storage room, galley, bar, pool table room and committee room.

== Eviction ==
On 31 January 2019 the MBYBC was evicted from the premises owned by Transnet National Port Authorities.
