= Ground continuity monitor =

- Acronym: GCM
- Other names: Ground integrity monitor
- Uses: Monitors the impedance to ground of a temporary electrical circuit

A GCM or ground continuity monitor (also called a ground integrity monitor or ground continuity tester) is an electrical safety device that monitors the impedance to ground of a temporary electrical circuit and can provide indication (or protective trip) in the event impedance rises to an unsafe value. A GCM is either an external testing device or a cord mounted device that measures the electrical continuity of a circuit’s path to ground.

== Regulatory ==
Ground continuity monitors are a means to provide protection to workers as part of Occupational Safety and Health Administration (OSHA) regulations. This OSHA regulation applies only to construction sites. (e.g. early stages of construction where access to a reliable ground might not exist or where portable generators might be used) The use of ground continuity monitors is one option in these environments. GFCI protected circuits are also one option under the OSHA standard. Specifically, the OSHA regulation specifies “The employer shall use either ground fault circuit interrupters … or an assured equipment grounding conductor program … to protect employees on construction sites.” The OSHA regulation also requires that each ground conductor and/or cordset shall be inspected each day, prior to use and after maintenance. The ground is required to be checked for electrical continuity and this test must be documented. The automatic cord mounted GCMs eliminate the need to test each cord or circuit, since the electrical impedance to ground is measured at the attached cord device and visibility indicated there via an LED. These inspections are required by the OSHA regulation on “receptacles which are not a part of the permanent wiring of the building”. As discussed earlier, the permanent wiring of a building might not be established during the early stages of a construction site and therefore would necessitate some assurance of ground protection.

== Operation ==
Although the OSHA regulations require either a ground conductor program or a ground fault circuit interrupter (GFCI), these two devices provide protection in very different ways. A GFCI disconnects a circuit whenever it detects that the electric current is not balanced between the energized conductor and the return neutral conductor.

See main article: Residual Current Device

A basic summary of the cord mounted GCM involves a conductor path from the energized conductor (“hot” or black wire) directly through a low-current LED and through the ground wire. This arrangement allows an easy visible indication of acceptable ground continuity in the ground wiring (which would be indicated by the LED being on). The minimum current draw of the LED can be designed such that an impedance value above regulatory limits will not light the LED. The arrangement of detection and components is not standardized as many manufacturers provide commercially available GCMs. Portable ground continuity testers have similar arrangements but generally provide a much broader range of testing options for electrical circuits.
