= XII International AIDS Conference, 1998 =

The XII International AIDS Conference was held in Geneva, Switzerland from 28 June - 3 July 1998. The theme of the conference was "Bridging the Gap."

== Topics covered ==
The Journal of the American Medical Association (JAMA) devoted the July issue of their magazine to HIV topics to support the conference, and chose especially to focus on two studies which would be presented at the conference. One focus was Roy Gulick's study on combination therapy for reducing viral load in HIV positive persons, in which AZT, 3TC and indinavir were shown to cause study participants to lower their viral load to undetectable levels. The other was Michael Giordano's study which showed that HIV positive mothers could reduce the risk of transmission of HIV to their child by elective cesarean section, taking AZT before delivery of the child, and taking AZT intravenously during the delivery.

=== Price of drugs ===
The Gay Men's Health Crisis stated that drug marketing for Efavirenz was part of this conference and that over 100 organizations worldwide had come together to issue a "Fair Price Consensus Statement" to guide policymakers on regulating the pricing of drugs. The issue was that Efavirenz was slated to go to market costing an average of $5000 per year and its efficacy was not proven over existing treatments, and GMHC and others were calling for expert oversight, pricing at rates which average people could afford, and greater community involvement in HIV/AIDS issues in general.

== Response ==
Lancet editor Richard Horton stated his belief that the conference failed to facilitate discussion between the developed world and the developing world, and thus failed to keep to its advertised theme of "bridging the gap."
