= 2026 Pattaya City local elections =

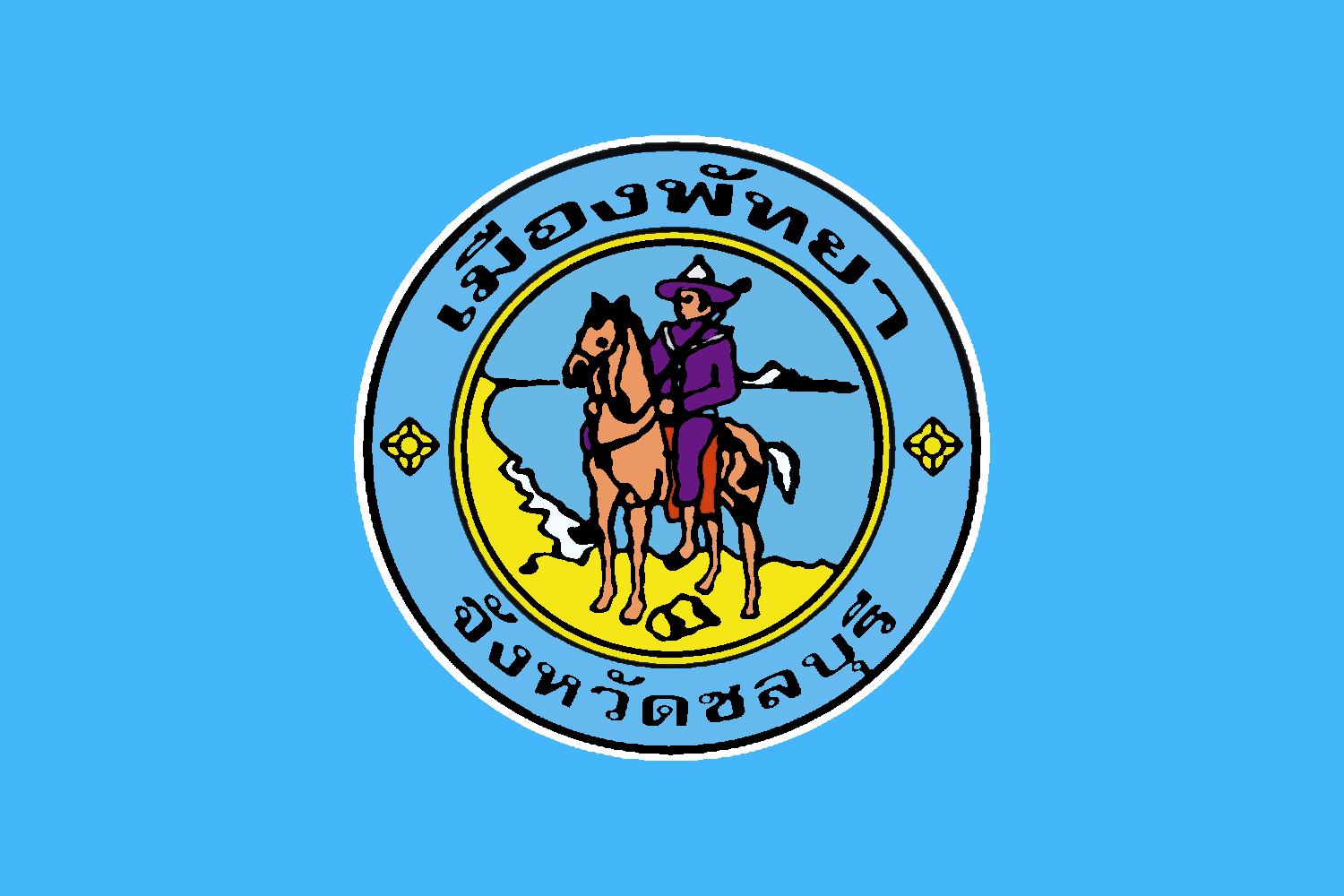
- 28 June 2026
- Mayoral election
- Registered: 80,188
- Turnout: 43.24% ▼6.72 pp
Candidate	Poramet Ngampichet	Itthiwat Wattanasartsathorn	Sakchai Tanghoh
Party	Rao Rak Pattaya	People's Party	Pattaya 2030
Popular vote	20,184	11,566	1,077
Percentage	59.21% ▲19.68 pp	33.93%	3.16% ▲0.86 pp
Mayor before election
Poramet Ngampichet
Rao Rak Pattaya
Elected mayor
Poramet Ngampichet
Rao Rak Pattaya
- City Council election

24 seats in the Pattya City Council 13 seats needed for a majority
- Registered: 79,922
- Turnout: 43.23%
	First party	Second party	Third party
Party	Rao Rak Pattaya	People's Party	Pattaya 2030
Last election	24	New	New
Seats won	24	0	0
Popular vote	86,472	53,087	5,364
Percentage	57.05%	35.02%	3.54%
- Composition of the Pattaya City council after the election: Rao Rak Pattaya Group

The 2026 Pattaya City local elections were held on 28 June 2026 to elect the mayor of Pattaya, as well as the 24 members of the city council. The election took place on the same day as the gubernatorial election in Bangkok. This was the fifth local election held in Pattaya.

Incumbent mayor Poramet Ngampichet won a comfortable majority and was re-elected to a second term whilst his party, Rao Rak Pattaya, won all 24 seats on the Pattaya City council. The People's Party came second with about a third of the vote. Its failure to win the mayoral election and secure any seats on the city council, combined with their disappointing performance in Bangkok, was a blow to the party after it sought to improve its grassroots politics following its performance at the general election in February 2026. In line with Pattaya's history of low turnouts, the 2026 election only had a 43.24% turnout.

== Background ==
Pattaya and Bangkok are the only cities in Thailand where the local leader is elected. Elections are held every 4-years, with the first election held in 2004. When Itthiphol Khunpluem term as mayor expired in 2016, no elections were held under the ruling National Council for Peace and Order until 2022. At local elections, voters are given two ballots - a green ballot for preferred mayor and a pink ballot for preferred councillors. On the green ballot, Pattaya voters are allowed to select only one candidate.

Pattaya City is divided into four districts (those being District 1, 2, 3 and 4) who each elect 6 members to the 24 members city council. In the 'Election of Members of Local Assemblies or Local Administrators Act, B.E. 2562 (2019), voters are not allowed to vote for more councillors than their constituency permits. This means Pattaya voters can only select up to 6 individuals on their pink ballots for the city council, but are allowed to select fewer than 6. Ballots with more than 6 candidates selected are deemed invalid. The electoral boundaries of each district were altered after 2022. In total, there were 113 polling stations in 2026: 28 in District 1, 27 in District 2, 25 in District 3 and 33 in District 4.

Voters are required to provide identification to be allowed to vote. Only a fraction of Pattaya's population is registered to vote in local elections due to many residents still being registered to other parts of Thailand. At the 2026 election, 80,188 residents registered to vote - an increase from 38,320 in 2022. However, Pattaya elections often generate a low turnout: 51.1% in 2004, 51% in 2008, 41.5% in 2012 election and 49.96% in 2022. Per Thai law, there is a ban on the sale of alcohol from 24 hours before polls close.

Nationally, Pattaya has been an electoral base in Chonburi and east Thailand for the progressive People's Party and its previous incarnations - Future Forward and Move Forward. In the 2026 general election held in February, the People's Party won Chonburi 9 constituency (which mainly contains just Pattaya) with 44.23% of the vote and have held the Pattaya area since 2019.

Poramet and the city council's term officially ended on 21 May. The Election Commission subsequently set June 28 as the date for local elections in both Pattaya and Bangkok.

== Candidates ==
No.	Party	Candidate
1/๑	People's Party	Itthiwat Wattanasartsathorn
2/๒	Rao Rak Pattaya	Poramet Ngampichet
3/๓	Pattaya 2030	Sakchai Tanghoh
4/๔	Independent	Suainee Charoensuk
5/๕	Independent	Itthiphol Nethiyakup Singkhornkaew

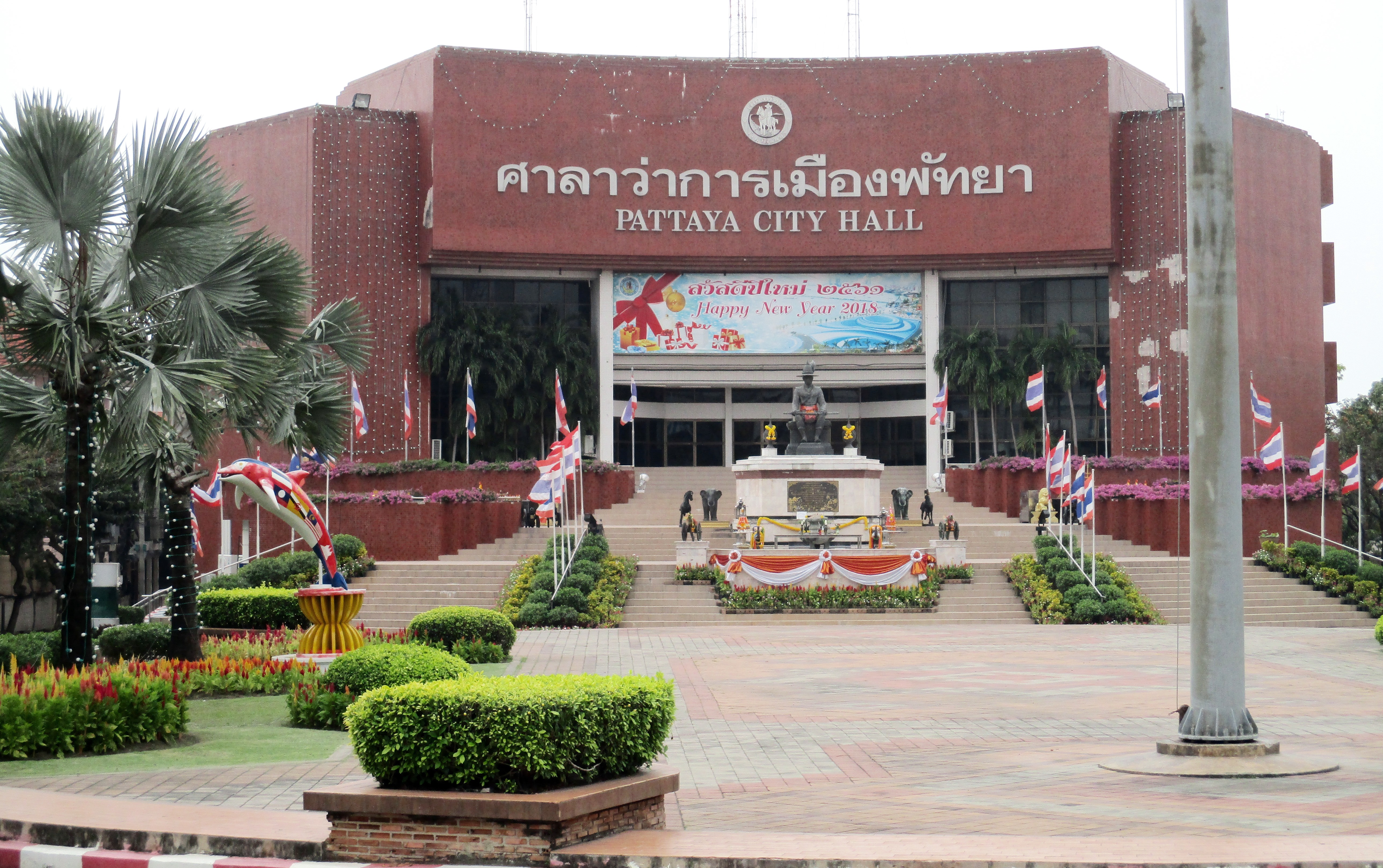
Pattaya City Hall, the seat of local government and where candidate registration occurred at.

Candidate registration for mayor and city council was open from 28 May to 1 June. Registration took place at City Hall, where the 3 leading mayoral candidates (Poramet, Itthiwat and Sakchai) led their political teams to register. Rao Rak Pattaya and the People's Party all fielded full teams to contest every council seat in each district, whilst the Pattaya 2030 fielded at least one candidate in each district. In total, there were 63 candidates standing for the city council. Ballot numbers were selected by a random draw.

Poramet was the incumbent mayor of Pattaya and won the last election in 2022 with 39.53% of the vote for Rao Rak Pattaya. Rao Rak Pattaya included former mayors Itthiphol and Sontaya Khunpluem. Poramet comes from the Ngampichet family of Chonburi politics: his father Santsak Jaroon Ngampichet served as a MP for Chonburi province and was Deputy Health Minister, whilst his brother Ekasit Ngampichet was head of the Pattaya Business and Tourism Association.

Itthiwat, the People's Party candidate, comes from the Watthasartsathorn family of Pattaya politics and is a former councillor. He is the younger brother of Sinchai Watthasartsathorn who contested the 2022 mayoral election under Pattaya Ruam Jai and, although he lost to Poramet, came second and was only about 200 votes behind him. Both Itthiwat and Sinchai are the brothers of Nirun Wattanasartsathorn, who was the first elected mayor of Pattaya and served from 2004 to 2008. Itthiwat and the People's Party council candidates were officially revealed on May 12 by party leader Natthaphong Ruengpanyawut accompanied by Future Forward founder Thanathorn Juangroongruangkit. Thanathorn is the leader of the Progressive Movement which fielded Kittisak Nilwatthanathochai as a mayoral candidate in 2022; he secured 23.76% of the vote behind Sinchai. Itthiwat replaced Nisamat Laoharatanahirun as the People's Party candidate after she withdrew on April 25, citing personal reasons that made her feel unable to fully commit to the election. Nisamat previously worked as secretary to the Tourism Committee and the Anti-Money Laundering Committee of the House of Representatives.

Sakchai previously was a mayoral candidate in 2022 where he ran as an independent and came fourth with 990 votes. He previously served as chief for Bang Lamung district, which contains Pattaya. Suainee, an independent, is a former MP for Chonburi 9 constituency. Itthiphol, another independent, is the former head of the Civil and Sanitation Department of Pattaya City.

== Campaign ==
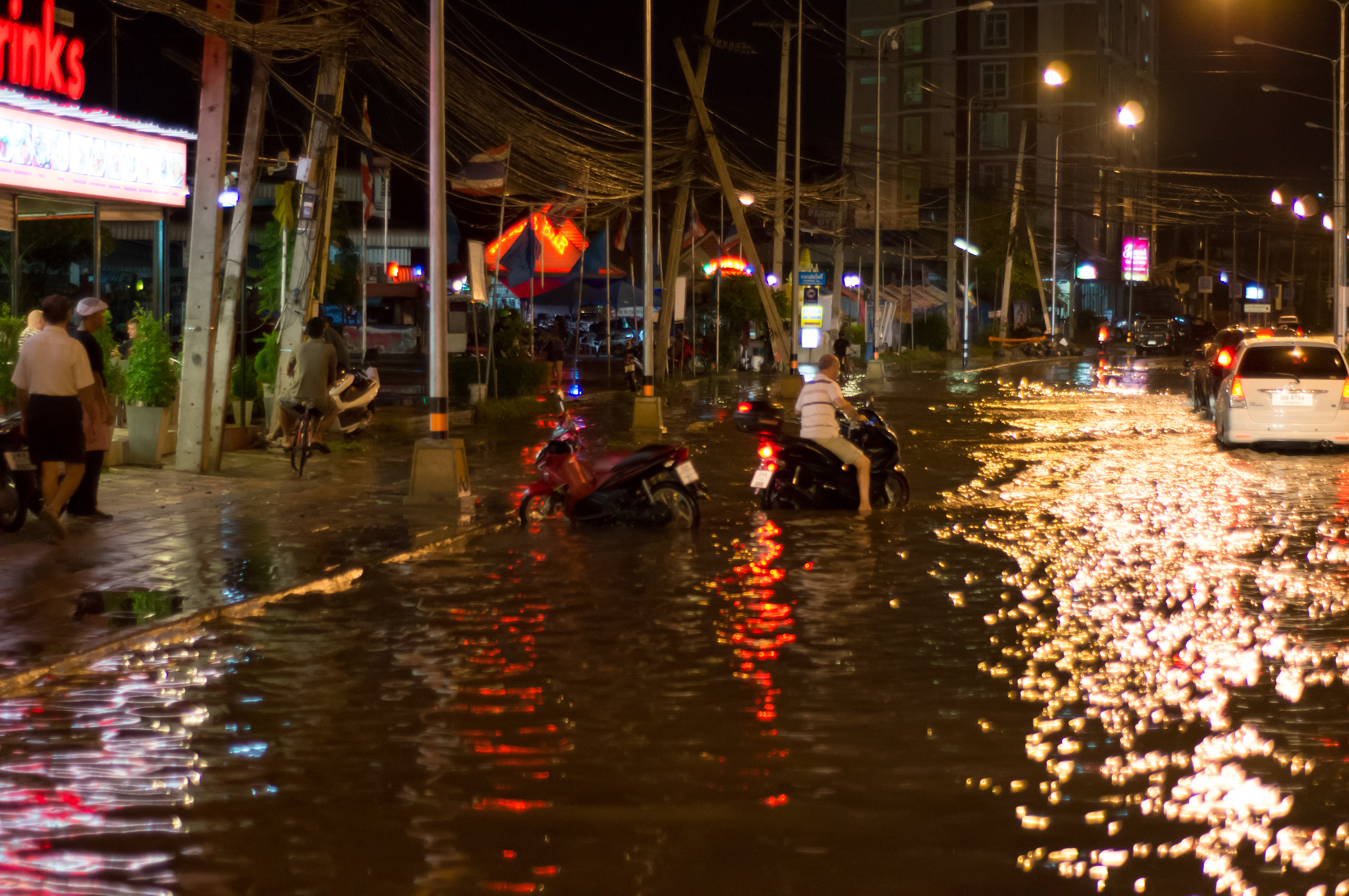
Example of a flooded Pattaya street from 2012. Improved flood and water management was cited in the campaigns of the 3 leading candidates.

Poramet and Rao Rak Pattaya campaigned on the "BETTER PATTAYA — Do It, Done It, Continue It" vision that emphasised his and the party's commitment to continued infrastructure upgrades and cultural events aimed at elevating Pattaya as a world-class tourist city. The campaign outlined 33 policies covering the city's economy, environment, society, technology and management. These policies were aimed at reaching 3 goals: economic development to increase the city's revenue and develop Pattaya into a city of festivals and conferences; improving the quality of Pattaya's environment and society to improve the quality of life, education and youth; and improving technology and city management to develop Pattaya into a 'Smart City'.

In implementing these policies and goals, Poramet campaigned on improving the city's infrastructure by promising a second waste incinerator once the one on Ko Lan was completed and increasing the wastewater treatment capacity from 65,000 cubic meters (17,000,000 U.S. gal) to 150,000 cubic meters (40,000,000 U.S. gal) per day. In terms of flood management, which continuously plague Pattaya, Poramet planned to implement a Water Crisis Centre system to monitor the water levels in pipes and install cameras to oversee the drainage system. For developing Pattaya into a Smart City, Poramet said Pattaya would install and link over 600 CCTV cameras to an AI system to detect crimes, manage traffic and evaluate drainage issues. For cultural development, they vowed to complete a delayed football stadium alongside establishing indoor stadiums, volleyball courts and training fields. A "happiness centre" was also envisioned as a way for people to spend leisure time together. Poramet also expressed his desire to see many of the projects currently still in progress completed.

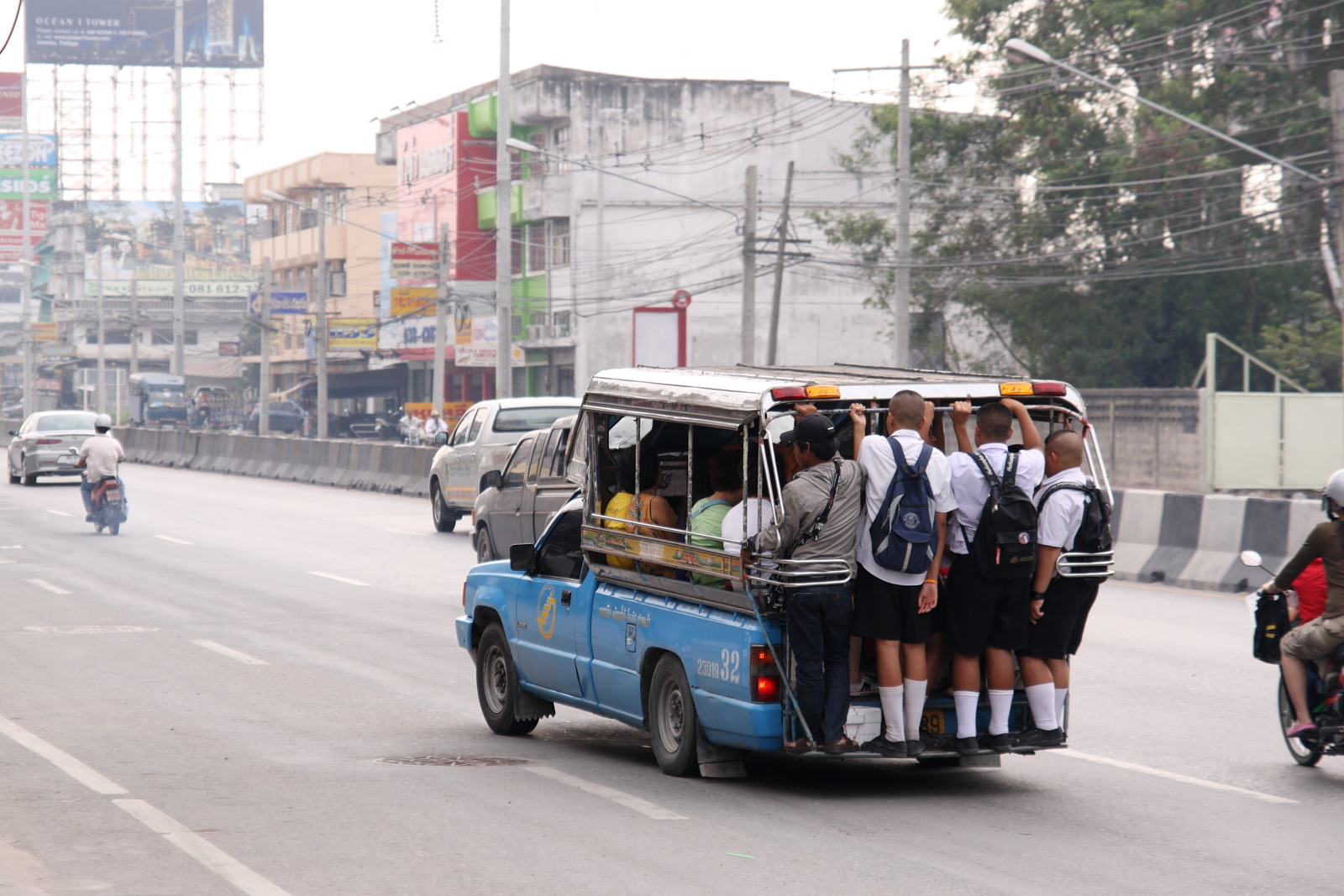
People, including students, riding a songthaew in 2008. Songthaews remain a common mode of public transport and the People's Party cited improvements to the transport system as a key policy.

Itthiwat and the People Party's campaigned under the slogan "Pattaya for Everyone". The party outlined 37 policies aimed at appealing to all occupations, emphasising transparency, equity and inclusiveness. Key policies included were a 24-hour childcare centre for night-shift workers, improving access to education, improving the opportunities of students after grade 9, and equal water prices on Ko Lan. Ko Lan's water supply uses reverse osmosis water at a higher cost of ฿70 per unit for residents compared to ฿20 paid on the mainland. To equalise and reduce water prices, Itthiwat proposed supplying Ko Lan with tap water from the mainland. To improve transport, they aimed to coordinate with songthaews to establish new routes that cover the entirety of Pattaya and set up standardised stops in line with what the party implemented in the Lamphun Provincial Administrative Organization. The local People's Party campaign received support from the national wing. Natthapong described the election as a choice between whether Pattaya will be a city for everyone or just for some. Thanathorn also campaigned on beautifying Pattaya by making it pedestrian-friendly and improving access to services, such as through Telehealth. The People's Party campaign was launched on March 31 when Nisamat was still its candidate.

Sakchai and Pattaya 2030 campaigned under the slogan "Mayor 24 Hours". Their main policies aimed at eradicating corruption, improved management of 'grey capital' and better management of the city administration. These goals aimed to foster greater trust with residents and tourists. The campaign also emphasised improved water management to keep Pattaya clean. Sakchai's campaign was launched on April 1.

== Results ==
=== Mayoral ===
Completed unofficial result below. Each candidate's percentage of the vote takes into account votes cast for none of the registered candidates.

Candidate	Party	Votes	%
Poramet Ngampichet	Rao Rak Pattaya	20,184	59.21
Itthiwat Wattanasartsathorn	People's Party	11,566	33.93
Sakchai Tanghoh	Pattaya 2030	1,077	3.16
Suainee Charoensuk	Independent	265	0.78
Itthiphol Nethiyakup Singkhornkaew	Independent	191	0.56
None of the above		805	2.36
Total		34,088	100.00
Valid votes		34,088	98.30
Invalid/blank votes		589	1.70
Total votes		34,677	100.00
Registered voters/turnout		80,188	43.24

Unofficial vote counts released throughout the night on June 28 indicated that Poramet was in the lead and on track for re-election. People's Party executives held a press conference at 7.35 p.m., led by Natthaphong, where they conceded that Itthiwat fell short of winning but would continue to watch the results for the city council. An unofficial vote count was released at 10 p.m., showing that Poramet had been re-elected mayor. He told the media that he vowed to continue the unfinished work of the previous 4-years, such as increasing the city's revenue, solving Pattaya's flood issues and making Pattaya a top tourist destination in the world. Itthiwat conceded defeat and thanked all those who voted for him and the People's Party.

=== City Council ===
District 1

Party	Candidate	Votes	%
Rao Rak Pattaya	Pasakorn Yusomborun	4,165	9.90
Rao Rak Pattaya	Thanaphat Udomrattanakulchai	3,912	9.30
Rao Rak Pattaya	Bunlue Kullawanich	3,896	9.26
Rao Rak Pattaya	Suparek Chompunuch	3,886	9.24
Rao Rak Pattaya	Duanskaw Jamcharoen	3,881	9.23
Rao Rak Pattaya	Anupong Puttanawarat	3,856	9.17
People's Party	Santi Thongsuk	3,165	7.53
People's Party	Ranchet Pinphet	2,915	6.93
People's Party	Naphon Timchak	2,896	6.89
People's Party	Waiwit Chavalit	2,853	6.78
People's Party	Nantap Surapacharakul	2,820	6.71
People's Party	Amarin Boriboonnakhom	2,743	6.52
Pattaya 2030	Watcharasak Siriwattanakit	598	1.42
None of the above		471	1.12
Total possible votes (6 per voter)		57,318	
Total number of votes		42,057	
Valid ballots		8,848	92.62
Invalid/blank ballots		705	7.38
Total number of voters		9,553	100.00
Registered/turnout		20,049	47.65
Party total votes
Rao Rak Pattaya		23,596	56.10
People's Party		17,392	41.35
Pattaya 2030		598	1.42
Other		471	1.12

District 2

Party	Candidate	Votes	%
Rao Rak Pattaya	Chalermpol Phongluin	3,784	10.24
Rao Rak Pattaya	Sorawit Sutthishamrongsawat	3,664	9.92
Rao Rak Pattaya	Sakchai Charoen	3,552	9.61
Rao Rak Pattaya	Satit Thapkhan	3,542	9.59
Rao Rak Pattaya	Surin Yimyai	3,473	9.40
Rao Rak Pattaya	Wichet Nongyai	3,390	9.18
People's Party	Rajai Pathan	2,150	5.82
People's Party	Intachoti Sankudlon	2,050	5.55
People's Party	Patcharakrit Wiriyayut	1,966	5.32
People's Party	Sumali Mingoen	1,919	5.19
People's Party	Mathuphum Rungroj	1,893	5.12
People's Party	Attapol Chomphuthong	1,874	5.07
Pattaya 2030	Thongthong Makkanemi	809	2.19
Independent	Nathapatsara Methinekittikirti	608	1.65
Pattaya 2030	Thanasit Chaichanachotiweerakul	519	1.40
Pattaya 2030	Preecha Sukruen	450	1.22
Independent	Thanacha Ajjamniar	409	1.11
Independent	Kittisak Oprateep	379	1.03
None of the above		512	1.39
Total possible votes (6 per voter)		52,026	
Total number of votes		36,943	
Valid ballots		8,184	94.38
Invalid/blank ballots		487	5.62
Total number of voters		8,671	100.00
Registered/turnout		19,360	44.79
Party total votes
Rao Rak Pattaya		21,405	57.94
People's Party		11,852	32.08
Other/Independent		1,908	5.16
Pattaya 2030		1,778	4.81

District 3

Party	Candidate	Votes	%
Rao Rak Pattaya	Wisal Pettrakul	3,636	10.01
Rao Rak Pattaya	Sanachai Phonglukin	3,476	9.57
Rao Rak Pattaya	Pittaya Piromon	3,459	9.52
Rao Rak Pattaya	Vasant Sukki	3,436	9.46
Rao Rak Pattaya	Jirawat Awakjai	3,378	9.30
Rao Rak Pattaya	Banjong Bandurprayuth	3,261	8.98
People's Party	Ekrachach Danchaodaeng	2,123	5.85
People's Party	Jaruspong Sripan	2,028	5.58
People's Party	Chatchai Pansaeng	2,023	5.57
People's Party	Udon Sontai	2,003	5.52
People's Party	Thongchai Sukkhojai	1,976	5.44
People's Party	Nusara Jehamad	1,970	5.42
Independent	Puritat Uthaiwong	794	2.19
Pattaya 2030	Thanespol Ekklang	570	1.57
Pattaya 2030	Sangdao Nilniyom	521	1.43
Independent	Wuttisak Chatthongkham	398	1.10
Independent	Phusit Chatthongkham	398	1.10
Independent	Krittayakorn Mingoen	395	1.09
None of the above		474	1.31
Total possible votes (6 per voter)		49,950	
Total number of votes		36,319	
Valid ballots		7,865	94.47
Invalid/blank ballots		460	5.53
Total number of voters		8,325	100.00
Registered/turnout		19,582	42.51
Party total votes
Rao Rak Pattaya		20,646	56.85
People's Party		12,123	33.38
Other/Independent		2,459	6.77
Pattaya 2030		1,091	3.00

District 4

Party	Candidate	Votes	%
Rao Rak Pattaya	Phairawan Omchuen	3,634	10.02
Rao Rak Pattaya	Prapraporn Deedan	3,501	9.66
Rao Rak Pattaya	Wuttithorn Sangurai	3,498	9.65
Rao Rak Pattaya	Methakrit Suntorn	3,488	9.62
Rao Rak Pattaya	Suchart Khun Cheung	3,433	9.47
Rao Rak Pattaya	Nikom Sangkaew	3,271	9.02
People's Party	Teeratham Kampa	2,070	5.71
People's Party	Pont Somboon	1,964	5.42
People's Party	Seni Khakhai	1,961	5.41
People's Party	Pannee Rattanaliam	1,930	5.32
People's Party	Vanich Kandit	1,914	5.28
People's Party	Thanawat Chandao	1,881	5.19
Pattaya 2030	Sujin Nong Yai	751	2.07
Pattaya 2030	Pattanan Thanatarasiri	593	1.64
Pattaya 2030	Paiboon Sangkabutr	553	1.53
Independent	Varanyu Hansajon	491	1.35
Independent	Nattapol Srisatit	465	1.28
Independent	Weerachart Chotinok	450	1.24
None of the above		413	1.14
Total possible votes (6 per voter)		48,030	
Total number of votes		36,261	
Valid ballots		7,651	95.58
Invalid/blank ballots		354	4.42
Total number of voters		8,005	100.00
Registered/turnout		20,931	38.24
Party total votes
Rao Rak Pattaya		20,825	57.43
People's Party		11,720	32.32
Pattaya 2030		1,897	5.23
Other/Independent		1,819	5.02

=== Aftermath ===
Together with the People's Party poor performance in the Bangkok gubernatorial election, the party's loss in Pattaya was seen as an electoral blow that followed the party's failure to secure victory in the 2026 general election. Both elections raised questions about the part's ability to convert national popularity into victories, its electoral strategy and its leadership. Phicharn Chaowapatanawong, secretary-general for the People's Party, addressed the party's dual defeats by stating that the party would need to improve how it communicates its policies and agenda to voters who approached local elections differently to national ones.
