= Somchai Khunpluem =

Thai politician, businessman, and organized crime boss (1937–2019)

Somchai Khunpluem, alternatively spelled Kunplome (Thai: สมชาย คุณปลื้ม; 30 September 1937 – 17 June 2019), was a Thai politician, businessman and organized crime boss. He was also known by the nickname "Kamnan Poh"(Thai: กำนันเป๊าะ, "subdistrict headman Poh"). Highly influential in his home province of Chonburi and the whole eastern region, he was dubbed "godfather of Chonburi" or "godfather of the east" by Thai media. Somchai was long-term mayor of Saen Suk, Mueang Chonburi District.

== Life, business, and political career ==
Somchai was born as the son of a village headman, the second of eight siblings. He dropped out of school after grade four and started working as a teenager. He began as a restaurant bus boy before starting his own bus service. After some time as a monk and as a soldier, he became the partner of a French businessman active in the fishing industry in 1963. He married Satil Sancharoen, daughter of a fish trader. Later he expanded to the building sector, establishing his company Bang Saen Maha Nakhon. In 1968, he became headman ("kamnan") of Saen Suk sub-district. He opened a liquor distributorship, and later broadened his economic empire to several other industries. Most profitable were his activities in the construction and real estate sectors. He engaged in illegal activities like smuggling strategic goods during the Vietnam war and the Cambodian Civil War. The national government started to develop the eastern seaboard as an industrial region in the 1980s. Somchai became a key intermediary between the central government and multinational and local investors. This spurred the rise of his economic and political influence which he, in turn, used to provide for a further boost of the urban and industrial development of his home province. In 1989, Saen Suk (which includes the much frequented beach resort of Bang Saen) received the status of a municipality and Somchai, as the only candidate, became its first mayor. After the Thai Nation Party, which Somchai supported, won the national election in 1995 and its leader Banharn Silpa-archa became prime minister, he was often rewarded with government contracts. The combined assets of the Khunpluem and Sancharoen families were estimated on four billion baht in 2004.

Somchai enlisted as a canvasser for the Social Action Party in the 1970s. He later supported the Justice Unity Party (1992), the National Development Party (1992-95) and the Thai Nation Party (1995-2001). Without holding a high office, he was considered one of the most influential political figures of Thailand until 2004. Whichever party he supported usually won most of the electoral districts of Chonburi Province. By financially supporting parties and candidates, he controlled up to 20 seats in the Thai House of Representatives.

== Murder case ==
Somchai, together with local councillor Passakorn Homhuan, was charged with the premeditated murder of Prayoon Sithichote, headman of a neighbouring sub-district, through hired killers in 2003. They were sentenced to 25 years in jail by the criminal court in June 2004. Pending appeal proceedings, Somchai was set free on terms of a ten million baht bail. The appeals court confirmed the verdict in October 2005. He was also convicted in a corruption case in connection with the construction of a garbage dump, for which he was sentenced to five years and four months in jail. Somchai, however, was absent from the trials, jumped bail and lived in hiding for several years. He was arrested on 30 January 2013 on his way to a hospital in Bangkok's Pattanakarn area.

== Family ==
Somchai was the father of Sontaya Kunplome, leader of the Phalang Chon Party, president of Pattaya United F.C., minister of culture under Yingluck Shinawatra and former tourism minister under Thaksin Shinawatra, Wittaya Khunpluem, president of Chonburi F.C., chairman of the provincial administrative council of Chonburi and Member of Parliament representing Chonburi, Itthiphol Khunpluem, mayor of Pattaya and Narongchai Khunpleum, Mayor of Saensuk Municipality.

== Death ==
Somchai died of colon cancer at Samitivej Chonburi Hospital on 17 June 2019.
