= Wittaya Khunpluem =

Thai politician (born 1965)

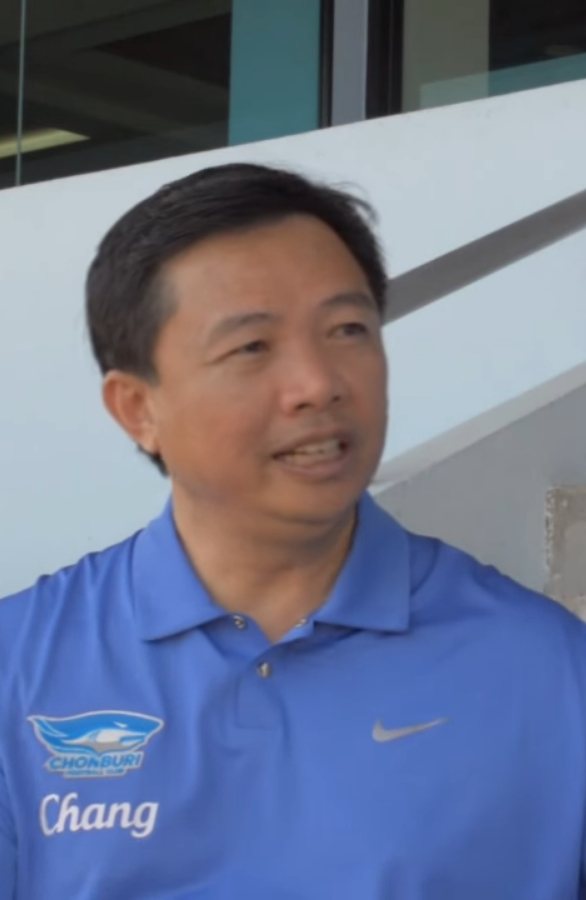
Wittaya Khunpluem

Wittaya Khunpluem (Thai: วิทยา คุณปลื้ม) was born on June 27, 1965, as an offspring of Somchai Khunpluem ("Kamnan Poh") and Satil Khunpluem. He is Thai politician. He represents the Chonburi province as a member of the parliament and president of Chonburi Provincial Administration Organization. Beside that he is the chairman of the Chonburi Football Club and of the Chonburi Football Association.

== Life and education ==
He studied and graduated at the Chulalongkorn University mainly in political science. His Master's degree he finished at the University of Southern California, USA. He started his political career, when he was elected as a member of parliament in 1992 for the Chonburi province.

His younger brother, Itthiphol Khunpluem, is the Mayor of the well known City Pattaya. His older brother, Sontaya Kunplome, leader of the Phalang Chon Party, president of Pattaya United F.C., minister of culture under Yingluck Shinawatra and former tourism minister under Thaksin Shinawatra.
