= 2022 Pattaya City local elections =

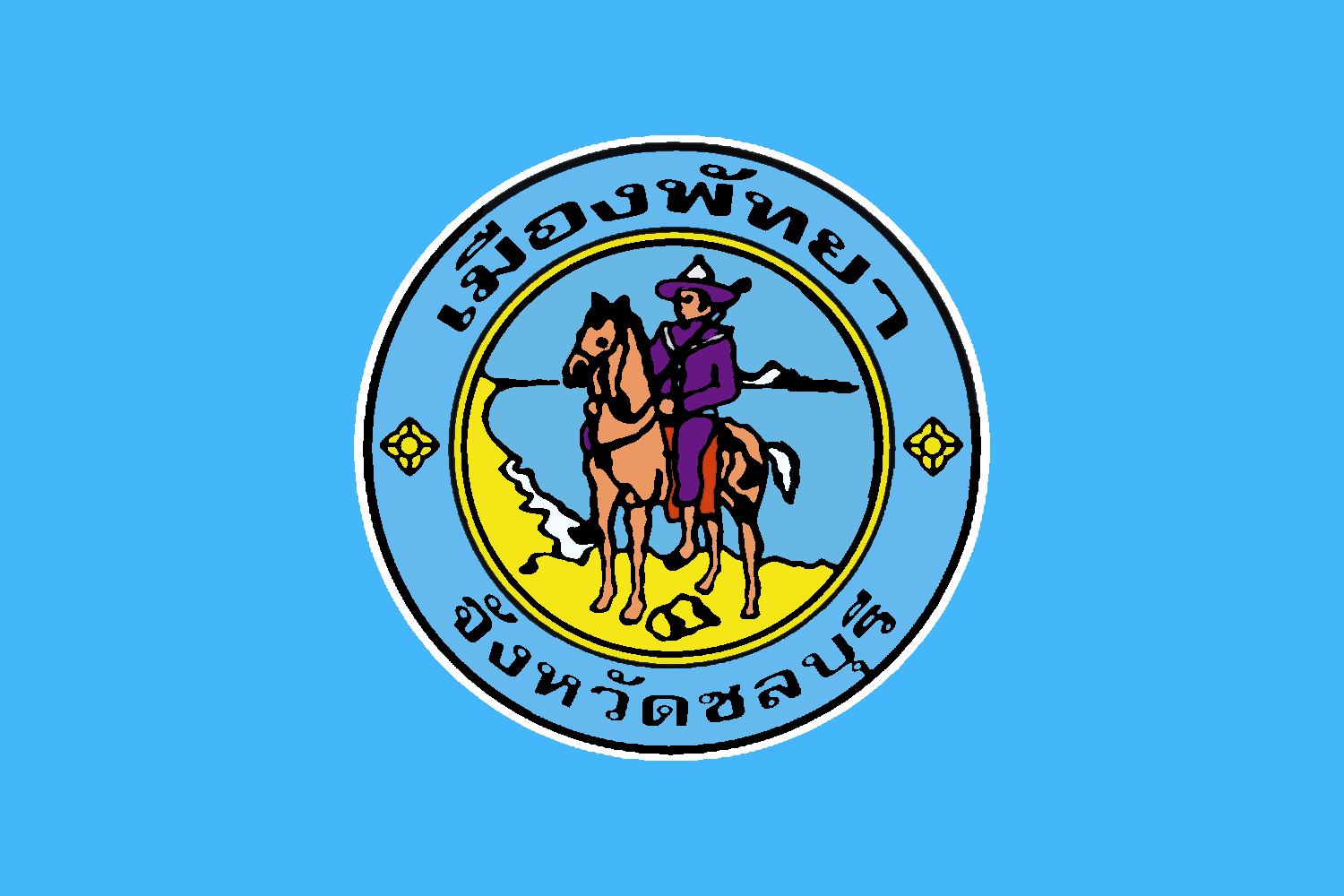
- 22 May 2022
- Mayoral election
- Registered: 38,320
- Turnout: 49.96% ▲8.46 pp
Candidate	Poramet Ngampichet	Sinchai Watthasartsathorn	Kittisak Nilwatthanathochai
Party	Rao Rak Pattaya	Pattaya Ruam Jai	Progressive Movement
Popular vote	14,349	12,477	8,759
Percentage	39.53%	34.41%	23.76%
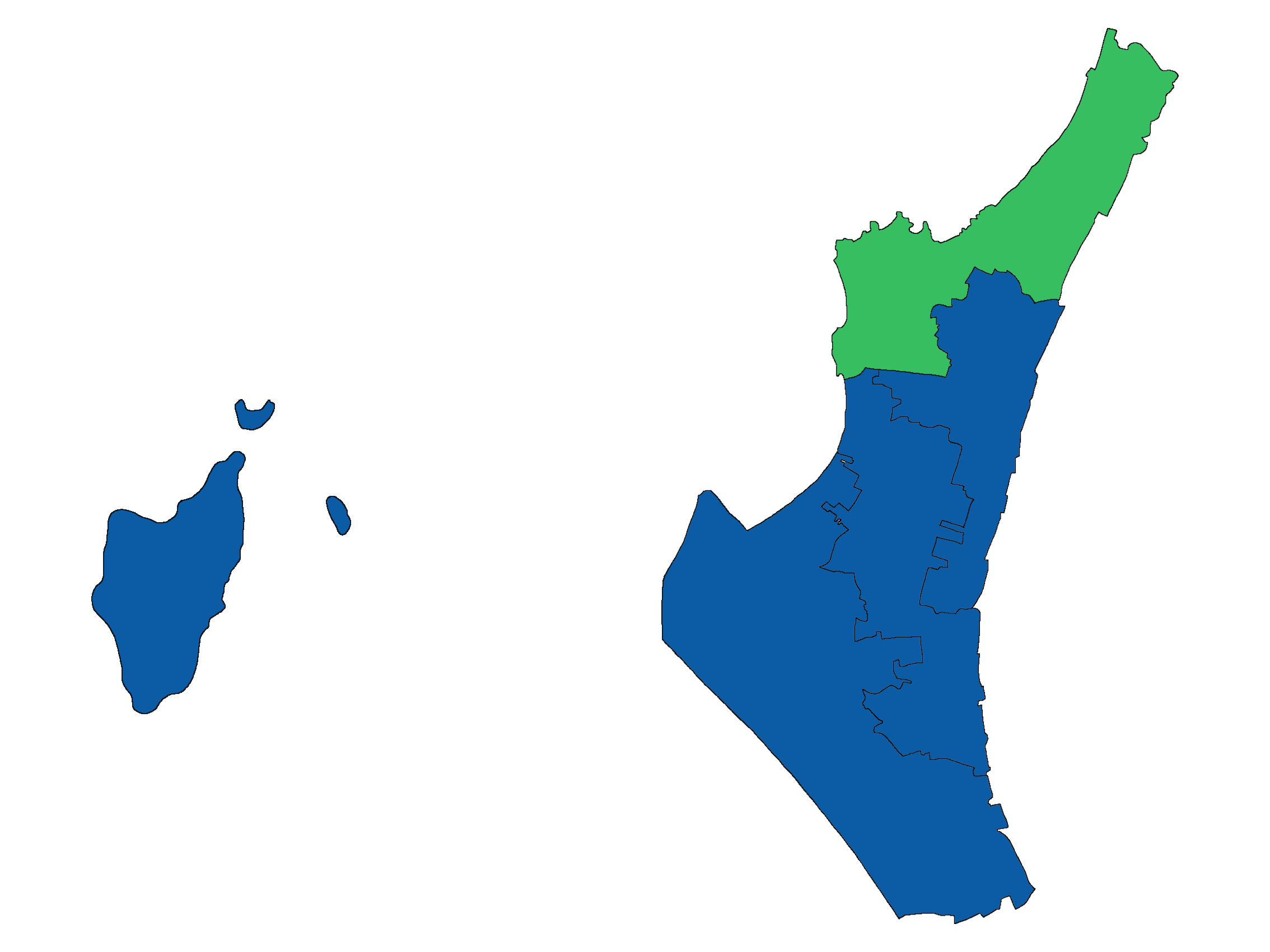
- Results by district for mayor: Poramet; Sinchai
Mayor before election
Sontaya Kunplome
Rao Rak Pattaya (Note: Sontaya was appointed by the NCPO.)
Elected mayor
Poramet Ngampichet
Rao Rak Pattaya
- City Council election

24 seats in the Pattya City Council 13 seats needed for a majority
	First party
Party	Rao Rak Pattaya
Last election	24
Seats won	24
- Composition of the Pattaya City council after the election: Rao Rak Pattaya Group

The 2022 Pattaya City local elections were held on 22 May 2022 to elect the mayor of Pattaya, as well as the 24 members of the city council. The election took place on the same day as the gubernatorial election in Bangkok. This was the fourth local election held in Pattaya and the first since June 2012 after all elections were postponed during the period of military rule from 2014 to 2019.

Out of 38,320 registered voters, there was only a 49.96% turnout, far below the goal of 70%. The mayoral election was won by Poramet Ngampichet of the incumbent Rao Rak Pattaya group with 14,349 votes. The group also won all 24 city council seats.

== Background ==
Pattaya is a special governed city in Thailand and is administered by a mayor who leads the executive branch of the council, with Pattaya being the only local area except Bangkok to elect their own local leader. The first election was held in 2004.

The role of mayor has been held the longest by the Khunpluem family, with past mayor Itthiphol Khunpluem serving as mayor from 2008 to 2016. Itthiphol won the last election held in Pattaya in 2012, and served until his term ended in 2016. He was replaced by Chanatpong Sriwiset and then Anan Charoenchasri, who were both appointed by the National Council for Peace and Order as a result of the 2014 coup which suspended all elections. Prayut Chan-o-cha then appointed Sontaya Kunplome as mayor of Pattaya on 26 September 2018.

Sontaya is the older brother of Itthiphol, and both are part of the Kunplome political family which previously dominated politics in Chonburi province. However, the 2019 general election showed a shift when three Palang Pracharath candidates backed by Sontaya were defeated by the Future Forward party.

On 9 September 2021, a cabinet meeting approved holding local elections in Bangkok and Pattaya, directing the Election Commission to begin planning with funding from the Ministry of the Interior. The Election Commission then announced on March 14 that the date of the Pattaya and Bangkok elections would be held on May 22.

Elections in Pattaya often see low voter turnouts: 51.1% in the 2004 election, 51% in the 2008 election, and 41.5% in the 2012 election. 5 million baht is allocated to the election from the Ministry of Interior.

=== Campaign issues ===
One of the biggest issues in the election was the COVID-19 pandemic and how a new mayor would handle the pandemic's effects. As a major tourist city, Pattaya was hit hard by the effects of low tourist numbers and the economic fallout of it. Flooding caused by heavy rain and aggravated by Climate Change, was another major issue that marked Sontaya's term as mayor where he implemented the NEO Pattaya project to increase the city's drainage system. Other issues included Pattaya's infrastructure, such as roads, and how it would keep up with the flow of tourists in the future; as well as water supply for residents on the outskirks of Pattaya.

== Mayoral Candidates ==
The Rao Rak Pattaya group (English: We Love Pattaya) had been the ruling local political group before the election with Sontaya Khunpluem, the incumbent mayor of Pattaya, as its leader. In the 2022 election, they nominated Poramet Ngampichet as the candidate. Poramet had served as a member of parliament for Chonburi province, and recently as the deputy-minister of culture until his resignation on 14 March 2022. Mayor Sontaya Khunpluem did not contest in this election as he instead planned to contest a seat in the 2023 general elections, although there were speculations that he would run again.

The Pattaya Ruam Jai group is led by former mayor Nirun Wattanasartsaton, who served from 2004 to 2008 as the first elected mayor of Pattaya. The political group fielded Sinchai Watthasartsathorn, Nirun’s brother, as its candidate.

The Progressive Movement fielded Kittisak Nilvattanachai as its candidate and the group officially unveiled their campaign on 14 March 2022. Kittisak is a Pattaya native, he previously worked as a banker before joining the now disbanded Future Forward Party. The Progressive Movement is headed by Thanathorn Juangroongruangkit, who was the Future Forward Party’s leader and prime ministerial candidate in the 2019 general election. However, the party was subsequently dissolved by the constitutional court in 2020. Thanathorn then formed the Progressive Movement alongside the disbanded party’s general-secretary, Piyabutr Saengkanokkul.

Sakchai Tanghoh, the former district chief of Bang Lamung, ran in the election as an independent.

Candidate registration for the election was open from 31 March to 4 April, although on 31 March, all four candidates registered at Pattaya City hall and were placed on the ballot in the following order:

Ballot number	Party	Candidate
1	Rao Rak Pattaya	Poramet Ngampichet
2	Independent	Sakchai Tanghoh
3	Progressive	Kittisak Nilvattanachai
4	Pattaya Ruam Jai	Sinchai Watthasartsathorn

== Election ==
=== Campaign ===
On 12 February, Thanathorn visited Pattaya where he met with business owners and surveyed the economic situation of the city as a result of COVID-19. His Progressive party campaign theme was "reclaiming Pattaya for everyone".

Polls conducted for the election consistently showed Poramet as the favoured candidate. Poramet and his party ran on the policies of boosting tourism by increasing tourist events and adding more local landmarks, as well as opening up a mangrove forest in Na Kluea to tourists.

The Pattaya Ruam Jai party made its final campaign in Na Kluea where they carried a banner calling for voters who want change to vote for Sinchai and council candidates 13 to 18.

As required by law, there was a 24-hour ban on the sale of alcohol on election day, 22 May.

=== Results ===
Poramet won the election with 14,349 of the 38,320 votes, allowing his party to hold all 24 council seats. Sinchai Watthasartsathorn and the Pattaya Ruam Jai party came in second with 12,477 votes; followed by Kittisak Nilwatthanathochai with 8,759 votes; and Sakchai Tanghoh with 990 votes. Of the 38,320 votes cast, only 36,575 (95.45%) of them were valid, with 1,001 (2.61%) being counted as invalid and 744 (1.94%) as "no votes".

However, the election had to be held again at polling stations No 2 in Constituency 1, and No 20 in Constituency 4 due to them missing one set of ballot papers for the election. Polling stations No 29 in Constituency 2 and No 5 in Constituency 3 instead experienced a surplus of extra ballot papers. Despite the recount, they had little effect on the winner, who remained Poramet.
