= Pattaya Floating Market =

Floating market in Thailand

Pattaya floating market
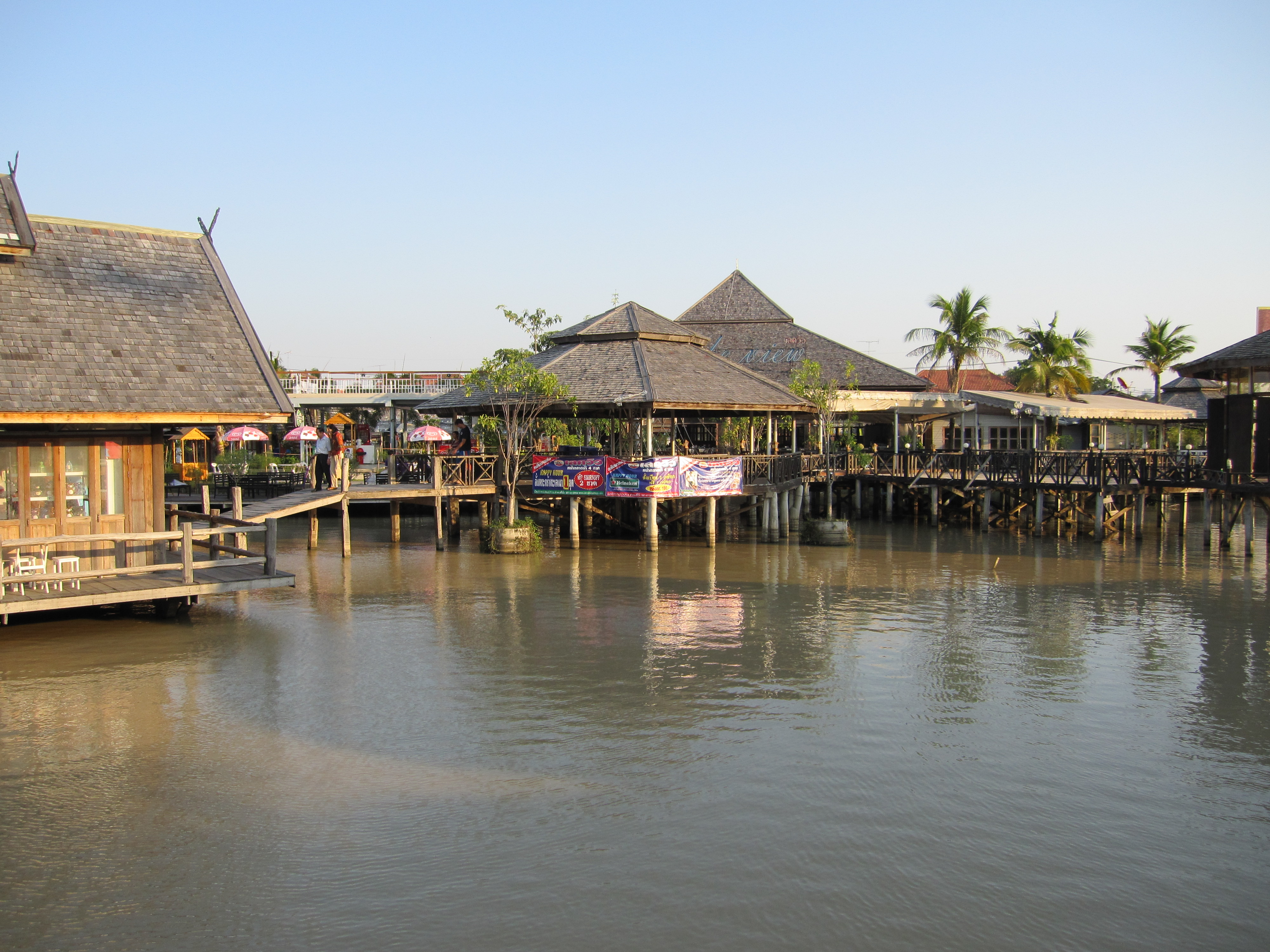
- The floating market in 2010
- Location: Pattaya, Chonburi province, Thailand
- Opened: 1 November 2008; 18 years ago
- Num. of stores: ~500
- Website: https://www.pattayafloatingmarket.com/

The Pattaya Floating Market, also called the Four Regions Floating Market after Thailand's four regions, is a floating market on the outskirts of Pattaya along Sukhumvit road in Chonburi province, Thailand. Opened in 2008 by Warida Sae-eng, the market covers 109,270m² (27 acres) and costed ฿350 million. It is the only floating market in Pattaya and is the largest floating market on a man made body of water in the world. The market is constructed out of teak with thatched roofs in traditional Thai architecture.

== History ==
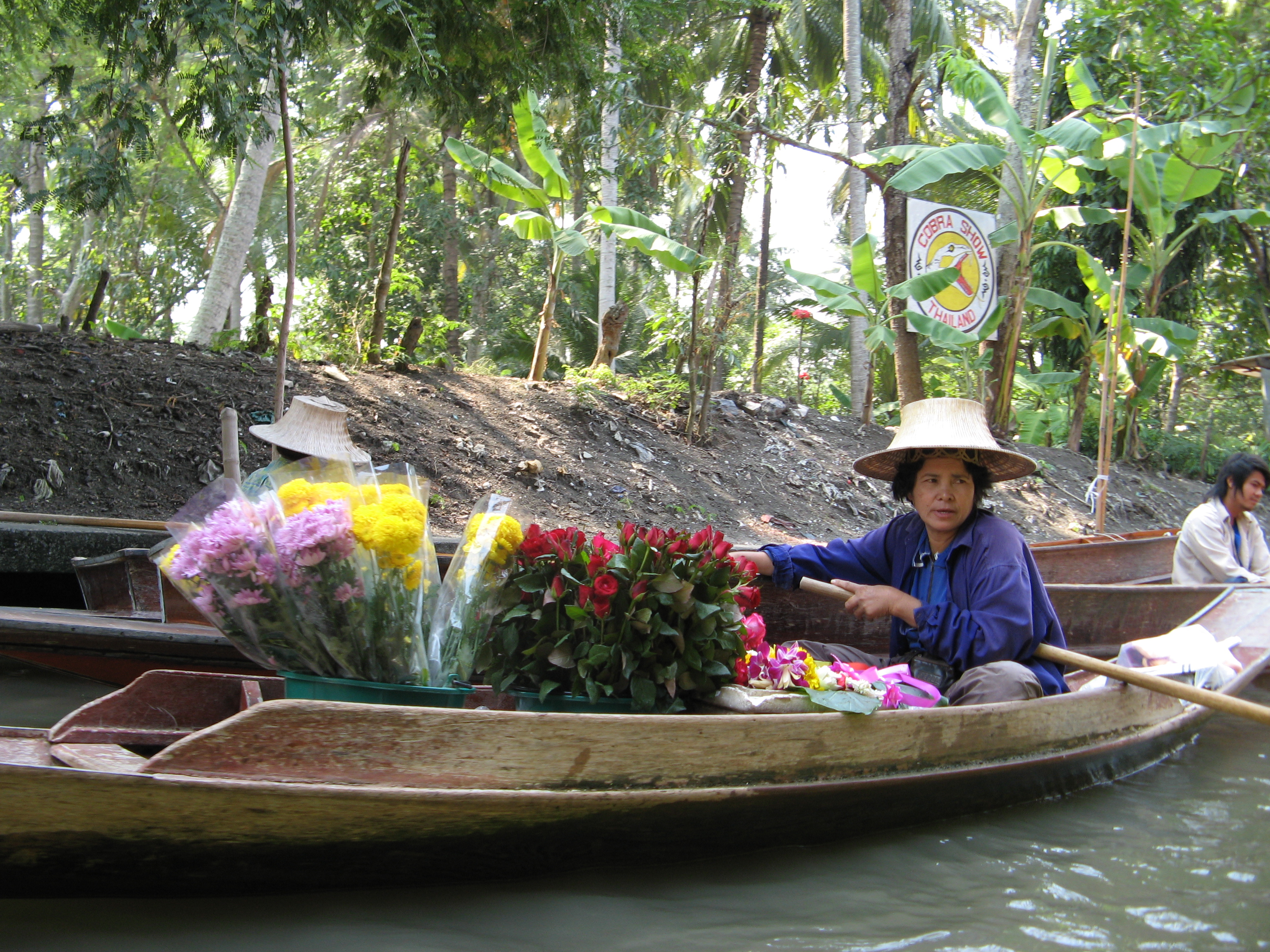
A vendor rowing her boat within the market's pond in 2023.

Thai people, particularly those of the central region around the Chao Phraya River, have historically traded agricultural goods and other products on rivers and canals. Floating markets gradually disappeared following the introduction of cars and the increasingly use of roads instead of waterways from the mid-20th century onwards. However, they also became important tourist sites. In the late 1990s and early 2000s, the Thai government introduced community-based cultural tourism programmes to promote floating markets. The economic success of floating markets stimulated the establishment of new markets by the private sector in areas floating markets never existed in, such as Pattaya.

In 2008, private investors from Bangkok sought to capitalise on the lack of major cultural attractions around Pattaya - a popular beach resort on the Bay of Bangkok. A swampy 93,000 square metres (23 acres) area on the side of Sukhumvit road (which connects Thailand's east to Bangkok) was transformed into a pond with a traditional-styled 'stimulated' floating market constructed atop of it by Warida Sae-eng. It was officially opened on 1 November 2008. The market has since expanded in three phrases. Merchants, mostly from Bangkok, were brought in to sell at booths and locals were hired as vendors on boats. Old boats from Ayutthaya were also bought for use.

The floating market is a popular attraction in Pattaya. In 2014, it attracted around 200,000 visitors per month. Around 80% of tourists originated from Asian countries, mainly China. Asian tourists were particularly attracted due to the market's close connection with tour agencies as Asian tourists mainly visit through them The high prevalence of Chinese tourists was also explained by market's use as a setting in the 2010 Chinese drama film Go Lala Go!, making it a 'must-go' destination for those visiting Pattaya. Tourist visits are particularly high during Chinese New Year and Loy Krathong. Chinese tourist numbers decreased whenever a tour agency experienced a problem with the market's management, normally because of issues surrounding commissions. The prevalence of Chinese tourists has caused a shift away from Western tourists led to balsams, t-shirts, and cooked foods becoming more prevalent than wood carvings, silverware, paper umbrellas, bamboo furniture and jewellery. Chinese is commonly used on signposts with English, and many vendors are able to converse in both languages. In 2017, the most common type of tourist was Asian, female, aged 36-50 and travelling with a tour group.

=== 2023 fire ===
A fire occurred at the market around 8 p.m. on 7 September 2023 not long after it had closed for visitors. Water from the market's pond was used by firefighters due to the limited access to fire engines and the fire was extinguished by 9:30 p.m. before it could spread to nearby residential areas. Mayor of Pattaya City, Poramet Ngampichet, estimated that 40 to 50 shops were affected or about 10 to 20% of the market's area, totalling around ฿70 to ฿100 million in damages. Bang Lamung district chief Pisit Sirisawatnukul placed the estimate lower to ฿40 to ฿50 million. An electrical short circuit likely sparked the fire that quickly spread amongst the wooden structures. It reopened on September 16.

== Description ==
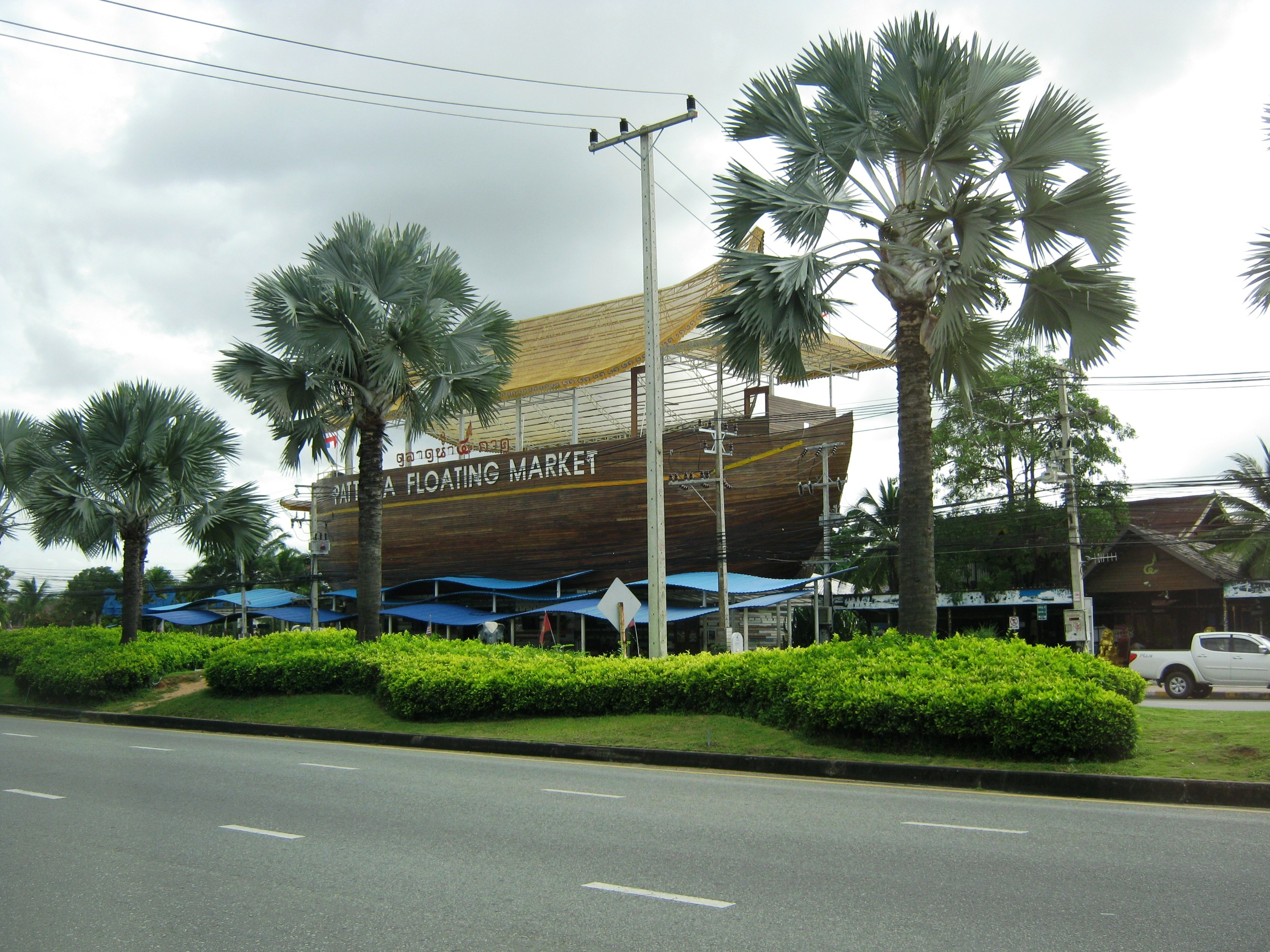
Entrance to the market as seen in 2008.

The floating market is designed as a general reflection of Thailand. The market is divided into four sections representing Thailand's main regions: the North, the Northeast, Central and the South. Buildings in each section are generally constructed in the traditional architecture of each region. Although it is owned by a private company and only themed as 'old' Thailand, the market displays many features that connects it to Thai traditions. Each section has a commercial booth selling 'ready-to-eat' food products and souvenirs for tourists specific to the region. In the section for the North, products sold are crafted wood, silverware, northern produced fabrics, and silk and paper umbrellas; rattan furniture, accessories and woven bags for the Central; Mudmee and Preawa silk products, scented candles, and triangular backrest pillows for the Northeast; and for the South, wooden boat models, batik fabrics, and goods made from coconuts are sold.

A study conducted in 2013 and 2014 found that many vendors used traditional recipes for foods, such as pad Thai. Foods specific to tourists are also found. Many Chinese snacks, such as crocodile meat skewers, are sold to appeal to Chinese tourists. There are about 500 shops in total in the entire market and vendor boats are stationary next to the walkways. Aside from shops and vendors, the market has a variety of attractions such as a herbal garden, massage demonstration and monkey show.

The market's managers have taken strict measures to maintain the sites. Any vendors found polluting the water have their contracts terminated. Foreign tourists have to pay a ฿200 entrance fee, and the market is open from 8 a.m. to 8 pm. throughout the week. The market is the largest freshwater pond in East Thailand and the only tourist site to uphold the self-sufficient living concept of King Bhumibol Adulyadej.
