= Veera Rojpojanarat =

Thai politician

- วีระ โรจน์พจนรัตน์
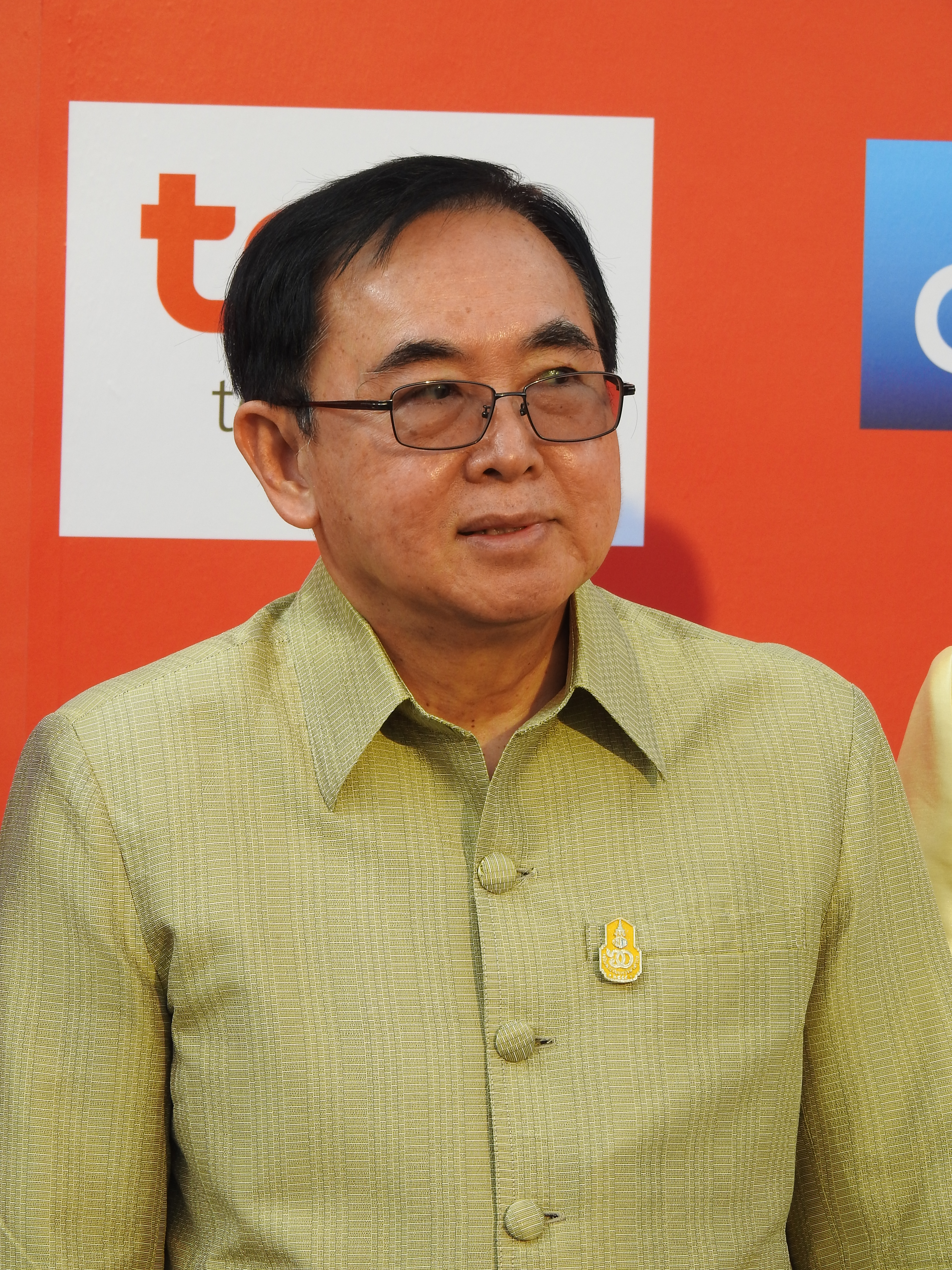
- Veera Rojpojanarat in 2019

Minister of Culture
- In office 31 August 2014 – 10 July 2019
- Preceded by: Sontaya Kunplome
- Succeeded by: Itthiphol Khunpluem

Personal details
- Born: 11 March 1952 (age 74)

Veera Rojpojanarat (Thai: วีระ โรจน์พจนรัตน์, RTGS: Wira Rotphotchanarat; born 11 March 1952) is a retired Thai civil servant. He held various positions in the Ministry of Culture, and served as Minister of Culture in the first cabinet of Prime Minister Prayut Chan-o-cha.

He serves as chairman of the Office of Knowledge Management and Development.

Political offices
Preceded by Sontaya Kunplome	Minister of Culture; 2014–2019	Succeeded by Itthiphol Khunpluem
