= Sukumol Kunplome =

Thai politician (born 1975)

- สุกุมล คุณปลื้ม

Minister of Culture
- In office 9 August 2011 – 28 October 2012
- Prime Minister: Yingluck Shinawatra
- Preceded by: Nipit Intarasombat
- Succeeded by: Sontaya Kunplome

Personal details
- Born: 25 September 1975 (age 51) Chonburi, Thailand
- Party: Pheu Thai
- Height: 1.67 m (5 ft 6 in)
- Spouse: Sontaya Kunplome
- Education: Assumption University

Sukumol Kunplome (Thai: สุกุมล คุณปลื้ม, RTGS: Sukumon Khunpluem, pronounced [sùʔ.kùʔ.mōn kʰūn.plɯ̂ːm]; born 25 September 1975) is a Thai politician. She was the country's minister of culture 2011–2012.

== Early life and education ==
Sukumol was born on 25 September 1975. She completed primary school from Dara Samut School at Phuket province and then High School from Saint Paul Convent School at Sriracha, Chonburi, and graduated from high school from Wattana Wittaya Academy. She graduated Bachelor of Business Administration from Assumption University.

== Personal life ==
Sukumol is married to Sontaya Kunplome, chief advisor of Phalang Chon Party. Her husband was barred from holding political offices for five years after the Supreme Tribunal dissolved Thai Rak Thai Party in May 2007.
