= College of Internet Distance Education =

Graduate School of eLearning (GSeL)
- Type: Private, Coeducational
- Established: 2002
- President: Rev. Bro. Dr. Bancha Saenghiran
- CEO: Prof. Dr. Srisakdi Charmonman
- Location: Bangkok, Thailand
- Campus: Hua Mak, Suvarnabhumi and City

Graduate School of eLearning, also known as GSeL, is a constituent of Assumption University of Thailand located in Suvarnabhumi area of Bangkok, Thailand. It is the first educational institution in Thailand to offer complete eLearning degree programs.
