= Office of Contemporary Art and Culture =

- สำนักงานศิลปวัฒนธรรมร่วมสมัย
- Official Emblem

Civil service overview
- Formed: October 3, 2002; 24 years ago
- Type: Government agency
- Headquarters: 3rd Floor, Watthanatham Wisit Building, No. 10 Thiam Ruam Mitr road, Huai Khwang subdistrict, Huai Khwang District, Bangkok 10310
- Employees: 74 (2024)
- Annual budget: 313,484,400 million baht; (fiscal year 2027) (Note: This constitutes the total budget of the Office of Contemporary Art and Culture, encompassing Category 3, Category 5, and Category 6. For further details, please refer to)
- Civil service executive: Itsara Riwthrakulphaiboon (Note: The said incumbent has been serving in an acting capacity since the date of retirement of the predecessor on September 30, 2026.), Acting Director-General
- Parent Civil service: Ministry of Culture
- Website: Official Website

The Office of Contemporary Art and Culture (Thai: สำนักงานศิลปวัฒนธรรมร่วมสมัย) is a government agency under the Ministry of Culture, holding department-level status. It was established in accordance with the Restructuring of Government Agencies Act, B.E. 2545. The agency is responsible for promoting, supporting, and disseminating contemporary art and culture to generate social value and enhance economic worth. Its mandate includes fostering, aiding, and publicizing creative activities in contemporary art and culture to enrich intellectual wisdom and cultivate societal applications. Furthermore, it promotes, supports, and establishes art galleries to serve as learning centers for contemporary artistic and cultural works.

The Office of Contemporary Art and Culture (OCAC) is mandated to promote, support, and disseminate activities related to the creation of contemporary art and culture, aimed at enhancing public wisdom and its application within society. To this end, the agency shall possess the following powers and duties:

1. To promote, support, and establish art galleries for the dissemination of contemporary artistic and cultural works
2. To coordinate networks of cultural organizations across both public and private sectors, both domestically and internationally
3. To provide and maintain an information technology and data center for contemporary art and culture
4. To conduct studies and research to develop knowledge, intellectual wisdom, and practical applications of contemporary art and culture
5. To mobilize resources and establish funds or financial sources dedicated to contemporary art and culture
6. To formulate policy proposals, action plans, and strategies for contemporary art and culture operations

On November 11, 2026, the House of Representatives is scheduled to consider the Restructuring of Government Agencies Bill (No. ....), B.E. ..... The bill aims to establish the Ministry of Sports and the Ministry of Culture and Tourism. A key provision under Section 37 (5) involves elevating the status of the Office of Contemporary Art and Culture to a new department-level agency within the Ministry of Culture and Tourism, to be named the Department of Contemporary Arts and Creative Culture.

During the meeting, the assembly voted 310–1, with 137 abstentions and 2 not voting, to approve the bill in principle at its first reading. It also resolved to establish a 25-member extraordinary committee to review the bill, setting a 15-day period for submitting amendments.
