= Sontaya Kunplome =

Thai politician

- สนธยา คุณปลื้ม
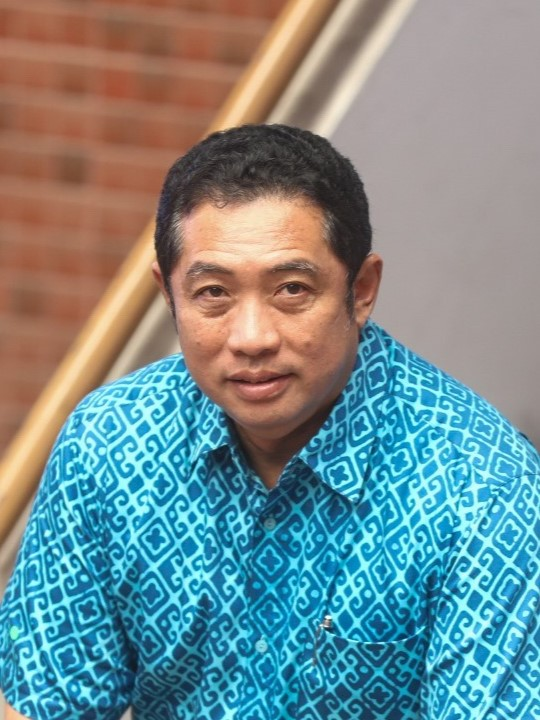
- Sontaya in 2021

Mayor of Pattaya City
- In office 26 September 2018 – 25 March 2022
- Preceded by: Anan Charoenchasri
- Succeeded by: Poramet Ngampichet

Minister of Culture
- In office 28 October 2012 – 22 May 2014
- Prime Minister: Yingluck Shinawatra
- Preceded by: Sukumol Kunplome
- Succeeded by: Veera Rojpojanarat

Minister of Tourism and Sports
- In office 3 October 2002 – 10 March 2004
- Prime Minister: Thaksin Shinawatra
- Preceded by: Position established
- Succeeded by: Somsak Thepsuthin

Minister of Science and Technology
- In office 17 February 2001 – 3 October 2002
- Prime Minister: Thaksin Shinawatra
- Preceded by: Arthit Ourairat
- Succeeded by: Pinit Jarusombat

Personal details
- Born: 10 December 1963 (age 62) Chonburi, Thailand
- Party: Palang Pracharath
- Other political affiliations: Pheu Thai
- Height: 1.75 m (5 ft 9 in)
- Spouse: Sukumol Kunplome
- Parent: Somchai Khunpluem (father)
- Relatives: Itthiphol Khunpluem (brother); Wittaya Khunpluem (brother)
- Education: Sripatum University
- Profession: Politician

Sontaya Kunplome (Thai: สนธยา คุณปลื้ม, RTGS: Sonthaya Khunpluem; born 10 December 1963) is a Thai politician. He was appointed political advisor to Prime Minister Prayut Chan-o-cha in April 2018. Later in September 2018, he was appointed Pattaya Mayor.

== Early life and education ==
Sontaya Kunplome was born on 10 December 1963 as the son of Somchai Khunpluem ("Kamnan Poh") and Satil Khunpluem. He graduated from Assumption College Sriracha and Bachelor of Laws from Sripatum University.

== Political careers ==
From 2001 to 2002, Sontaya was Minister of Science and Technology, and from 2002 to 2005 Minister of Tourism and Sports under Thaksin Shinawatra. As an executive member of the Thai Rak Thai Party, he has been banned from politics for five years since the Supreme Tribunal dissolved the party in May 2007. Since 2011, he is the chief adviser and de facto leader of the Phalang Chon Party. Sontaya is married to Sukumol Kunplome who has been culture minister in Yingluck Shinawatra's cabinet since 2011. Sontaya took over this position in November 2012.

On 17 April 2018, Prime Minister Prayut Chan-o-cha appointed Sonthaya, leader of the Phalang Chon Party to be Advisor to the Prime Minister in Political Affairs.

During the 2019 general elections, Sontaya began having conflicts with Suchart Chomklin over who the Palang Pracharath would field in the election. In Chonburi province in the election, Suchart's faction won three seats, whilst Sontaya's backed candidates were defeated by the Future Forward party.

== Mayor of Pattaya City ==
On 26 September 2018, Sontaya was appointed mayor of Pattaya City by Prime Minister Prayut for the benefit of operations in the Eastern Economic Corridor (EEC) as well as the reform of local government. Previously, his brother Itthiphol served as mayor from 2008 to 2016. His appointment generated criticism of Prayut who was accused of rewarding him to ensure his support from the Phalang Chon Party in the upcoming election. Prayut responded by dismissing accusations. On September 28, he announced his first policies which included turning Pattaya into the center of the EEC, developing a facility that turns garbage into energy.

He was succeeded by Poramet Ngampichet from Sontaya's Rao Rak Pattaya party in the 2022 mayoral elections.
