= Sabida Thaised =

Thai politician (born 1984)

- ซาบีดา ไทยเศรษฐ์
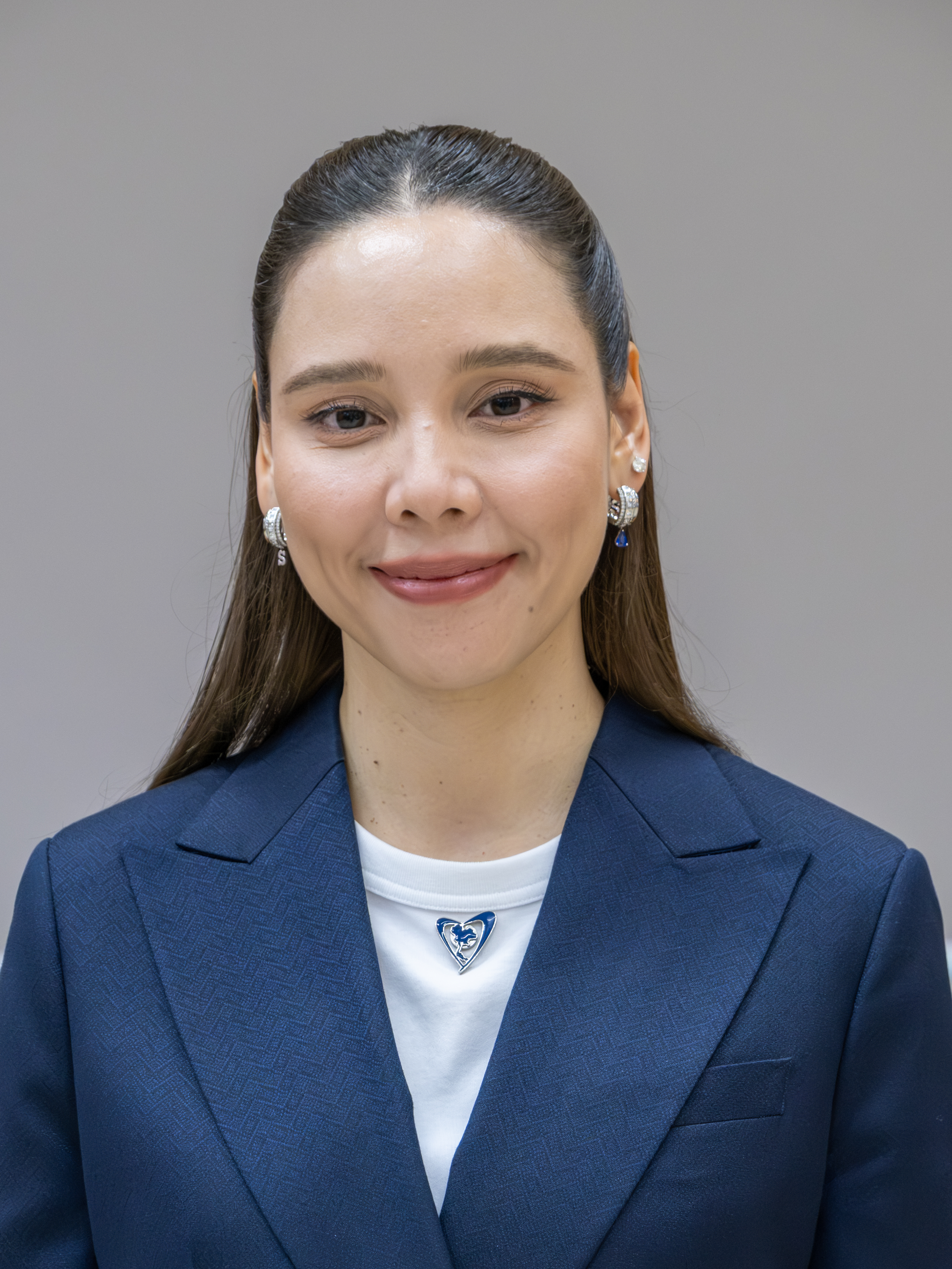
- Sabida at the Faculty of Political Science, Thammasat University in 2026

Minister of Culture
- Incumbent
- Assumed office 19 September 2025
- Prime Minister: Anutin Charnvirakul
- Preceded by: Paetongtarn Shinawatra; Suchart Tancharoen (acting)

Deputy Minister of Interior
- In office 3 September 2024 – 19 June 2025
- Prime Minister: Paetongtarn Shinawatra
- Minister: Anutin Charnvirakul

Member of the House of Representatives
- In office 8 February 2026 – 2 April 2026
- Constituency: Party-list

Personal details
- Born: October 11, 1984 (age 42) Uthai Thani, Thailand
- Party: Bhumjaithai (since 2018)
- Spouse: Anan Pathan (m. 2022)
- Parent: Chada Thaised (father)
- Education: Assumption University (LLB, LLM)

Sabida Thaised (Thai: ซาบีดา ไทยเศรษฐ์, RTGS: Sabida Thaiset; born 11 October 1984) is a Thai politician who has served as the minister of culture since September 2025. From 2024 to 2025, she previously served as the deputy minister of interior. Sabida is the third member of her family to serve in three successive cabinets, following her father Chada Thaised, who served as Deputy Minister of Interior from 2023 to 2024, and her aunt Mananya Thaiseth, who served as Deputy Minister of Agriculture from 2019 to 2023. Her father recommended she be appointed to succeed him.

== Early life and education ==
Thawed was born in Uthai Thani province, Thailand. She studied law at the Thomas Aquinas School of Law, Assumption University of Thailand, receiving both an LLB and an LLM. She graduated in 2003.

== Honours ==
- 2025 – Freemen Safeguarding Medal, Second Class 2nd Cat
