= Mananya Thaiseth =

Thai politician (born 1962)

- มนัญญา ไทยเศรษฐ์
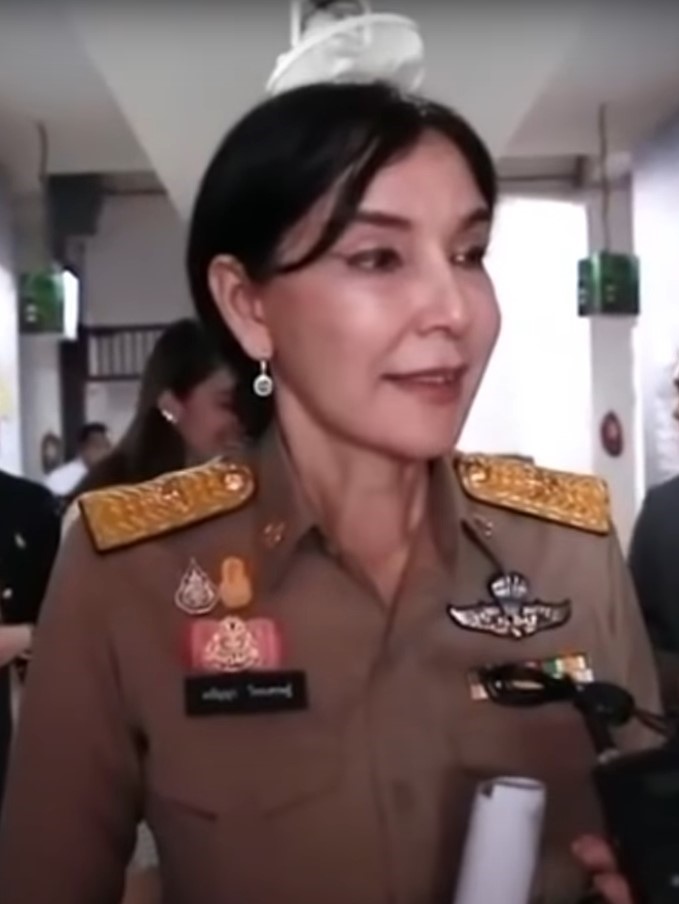

Deputy Minister of Agriculture and Cooperatives
- In office 10 July 2019 – 1 September 2023
- Prime Minister: Prayut Chan-o-cha
- Minister: Chalermchai Sri-on

Personal details
- Born: 7 August 1962 (age 63) Uthai Thani, Thailand
- Party: Bhumjaithai
- Relations: Chada Thaiseth (brother); Sabida Thaiseth (niece)
- Children: Jeset Thaiseth

Mananya Thaiseth (Thai: มนัญญา ไทยเศรษฐ์, RTGS: Menanya Thaiset; born 7 August 1962) is a Thai politician who served as the Deputy Minister of Agriculture and Cooperatives from 2019 to 2023. Thaiseth's brother Chada served as Deputy Minister of Interior from 2019 to 2023 and her niece Sabida serves as Deputy Minister of Interior. Thaiseth was previously a candidate for the Uthai Thani Provincial Administrative Organization (PAO) Chairman.

Her eldest son Jeset Thaiseth is an MP for Uthai Thani from the elections in 2019 and 2023.
