= Chada Thaised =

Thai politician (born 1963)

Chada Thaised MPCh MVM
- ชาดา ไทยเศรษฐ์
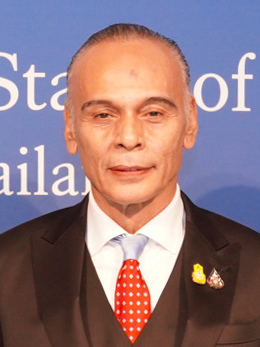
- Chada Thaiseth in 2023

Deputy Minister of Interior
- In office 1 September 2023 – 3 September 2024
- Prime Minister: Srettha Thavisin
- Minister: Anutin Charnvirakul

Member of the House of Representatives for Uthai Thani
- Incumbent
- Assumed office 23 December 2007

Deputy Leader of Bhumjaithai Party
- In office 2 October 2018 – 24 March 2024
- Leader: Anutin Charnvirakul

Personal details
- Born: 7 June 1961 (age 65) Uthai Thani, Thailand
- Party: Bhumjaithai (2018–present)
- Other political affiliations: Chart Thai (1988–2008); Chart Thai Pattana (2009–2018)
- Spouses: Tuanjittra Sangkrai (divorced); Atchara Thongthep (divorced)
- Relations: Mananya Thaised (sister); Jeset Thaiseth (nephew)
- Children: 7, including Sabida Thaiseth
- Education: BA and a master in Polical sci., Ramkhamhaeng University
- Occupation: Politician

Chada Thaised (Thai: ชาดา ไทยเศรษฐ์, RTGS: Chada Thaiset; born 7 June 1963) is a Thai politician and chao pho who is well known for his influence, especially in the Uthai Thani area. Dubbed as "Godfather of Sakae Krang Basin".

== Early life ==
Chada (personal nickname Lhada) was born to a Thai family of partial Pakistani Pathan ancestry hailing from Swati tribe of District Battagram, Khyber Pakhtunkhwa of Pakistan. His grandfather was a major beef trader, so it was passed down to his generation. His father also extended the family business to the timber trade. Both his father, mother and older brother were shot to death one after another as he grew up. Therefore, only he and his younger sister, Mananya Thaiseth, were left with his siblings.

His younger sister, Mananya Thaiseth, is a Deputy Agriculture Minister of Thailand.
