= Mayor of Pattaya City =

Head of government of Pattaya

Mayor of Pattaya
- นายกเมืองพัทยา
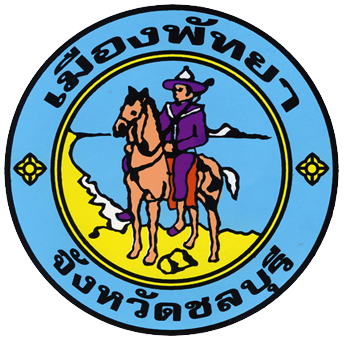
- Seal of Pattaya City
- Incumbent; Poramet Ngampichet since 22 May 2022
- Reports to: Governor of Chonburi province
- Residence: Pattaya City Hall
- Appointer: Direct election (Note: Since 2004, sometimes appointed by the Ministry of Interior or the military junta.)
- Term length: Four years
- Formation: 23 November 1978
- First holder: Sathap Keyanon
- Salary: ฿75,530

The mayor of Pattaya City (Thai: นายกเมืองพัทยา) is the head of the local government of Pattaya City in Thailand. Pattaya is a special local administrative area established in 1978 with a mayor. Since 2004, the mayor has been democratically elected by registered residents of Pattaya to a four-year term - making it and Bangkok the only two areas in Thailand where the local leader is elected. The current mayor is Poramet Ngampichet, who won the last mayoral election in 2022.

== History ==
=== Establishment ===
Pattaya is a city located on the coast of the Bay of Bangkok within Chonburi province of Thailand. Originally a small fishing village, tourism since the 1960s has historically driven Pattaya's development and economic growth into a major tourist city. A centralised state, most local officials in Thailand are appointed rather than elected such as the provincial governors. In 1975, the governor of Bangkok was made an elected position - making Bangkok the first area in Thailand where the local leader was elected.

In 1978, the Pattaya City Public Administration Regulation Act B.E. 2521 (1978) established Pattaya as a special local administrative area with a mayor. The Pattaya City Public Administration Regulation Act 1999 established a city council and the position of mayor, both of whom would be democratically elected by registered residents to a four-year term. Council members then elect a chairman with two vice-chairmen. The council has the purpose of monitoring and holding the mayor accountable. The mayor is empowered to nominate four deputies not already part of the council to assist the mayor in their workload and is responsible for overseeing the city's administration as head of all city officials and employees. The second highest office in the city administration is the Chief Manager.

The administrative authority of Pattaya City was also limited by the 1999 Act. The city is under the supervision of the Ministry of Interior represented by the governor of Chonburi province. Under articles 94 to 99, the governor has the authority to monitor and control the overall work of the city, as well as the authority to dismiss the city council.

=== Since 2004 ===
The first democratic elections were held in 2004 and saw Nirun Wattanasartsaton elected mayor. In 2008 and 2012, Itthiphol Khunpluem was elected. Following the 2014 coup, the National Council for Peace and Order (NCPO) suspended all elections in the country. Once Itthiphol reached his term limit, Prime Minister Prayut Chan-o-cha appointed Chanatpong Sriwiset acting mayor of Pattaya on 16 June 2016. He was replaced by police major general Anan Charoenchasri on 16 February 2017. The last individual appointed by the NCPO, Sontaya Khunpluem, was made mayor on 25 September 2018. Sontaya was the elder brother of Itthiphol and a member of the influential Khunpluem family of Chonburi.

== Powers and roles ==
The powers and roles of the mayor of Pattaya are outlined by the Pattaya City Administration Act 1999, and gives the mayor the authority to:

- Appoint and remove four individuals not already a member of the City Council to the position of Deputy-Mayor, secretaries, secretary assistants, head of the advisory board and the advisory board.
- Dismiss the city manager without the support of the City Council.
- Formulate policies and manage Pattaya's administration.
- Dissolve the City Council on the advice of the City Manager when the number of vacant positions is higher than the number of members.
- Perform duties as assigned by the Interior Minister, Prime Minister and City Manager

The total annual salary of the mayor is ฿75,530 - a base pay of ฿55,530 plus a position salary of ฿10,000 and a special remuneration of ฿10,000.

== Elections and appointment ==
Since 2004, the position of mayor has been an elected position with elections held every 4-years as established by the Pattaya City Public Administration Regulation Act B.E. 2542 (1999). Prior to this, the mayor had been elected by members of the City Council. The 1999 Act sets out the requirements for an individual to become mayor:

- Be a Thai national by birth
- Be at least 30-years old by election day
- Have graduated with a bachelor's degree or equivalent qualification
- Have their name listed in the house registry of Pattaya for more than one year, or have their name listed in the registry on the date of applying for candidacy and have paid home and land taxes or the local maintenance tax to Pattaya City for at least one year.

Elections in Pattaya often see low voter turnouts: 51.1% in 2004, 51% in 2008, 41.5% in 2012 , and 49.96% in 2022. Under the NCPO, elections were suspended and the mayor was appointed by the military junta. Elections were held again in 2022. The Rao Rak Pattaya (English: We Love Pattaya) Party has been the dominant party in Pattaya politics, with its members being mayors Itthiphol, Sontaya and Poramet.

== List of mayors ==
No.	Portrait	Name (Birth–Death)	Term of office			Party	Election
No.	Portrait	Name (Birth–Death)	Took office	Left office	Time in office	Party	Election
1		Sathap Keyanon สถาปน์ เกยานนท์	23 November 1978	8 February 1981	2 years, 77 days	Independent	Elected by City Council
2		Anusak Rodbunmee อนุศักดิ์ รอดบุญมี	8 February 1981	26 March 1985	4 years, 46 days	Independent	Elected by City Council
3		Sophon Phettrakun โสภณ เพ็ชรตระกูล	26 March 1985	12 May 1989	4 years, 47 days	Independent	Elected by City Council
4		Suchai Ruayrin สุชัย รวยริน	12 May 1989	9 July 1993	4 years, 58 days	Independent	Elected by City Council
5		Anupong Udomratkulchai อนุพงษ์ อุดมรัตน์กูลชัย	9 July 1993	18 July 1995	2 years, 9 days	Independent	Elected by City Council
6		Pirat Suthithamrongsawat ไพรัช สุทธิธำรงสวัสดิ์	18 July 1995	27 March 2004	8 years, 253 days	Independent	Elected by City Council
7		Nirun Wattanasartsaton นิรันดร์ วัฒนศาสตร์สาธร	27 March 2004	26 March 2008	3 years, 365 days	Independent	2004
8		Itthiphol Khunpluem อิทธิพล คุณปลื้ม (born 1973)	4 May 2008	16 June 2016	8 years, 43 days	Rao Rak Pattaya	2008
8		Itthiphol Khunpluem อิทธิพล คุณปลื้ม (born 1973)	4 May 2008	16 June 2016	8 years, 43 days	Rao Rak Pattaya	2012
Acting		Chanatpong Sriwiset ชนัฐพงศ์ ศรีวิเศษ	16 June 2016	16 February 2017	245 days	Independent	Appointed by NCPO
9		Anan Charoenchasri อนันต์ เจริญชาศรี	16 February 2017	25 September 2018	1 year, 221 days	Independent	Appointed by NCPO
10		Sontaya Khunpluem สนธยา คุณปลื้ม (born 1963)	25 September 2018	25 March 2022	3 years, 180 days	Rao Rak Pattaya	Appointed by NCPO
11		Poramet Ngampichet ปรเมศวร์ งามพิเชษฐ์ (born 1972)	22 May 2022	Incumbent	4 years, 108 days	Rao Rak Pattaya	2022
11		Poramet Ngampichet ปรเมศวร์ งามพิเชษฐ์ (born 1972)	22 May 2022	Incumbent	4 years, 108 days	Rao Rak Pattaya	2026
