= Palang Burapha Party =

Thai political party

Palang Burapha Party พรรคพลังบูรพา
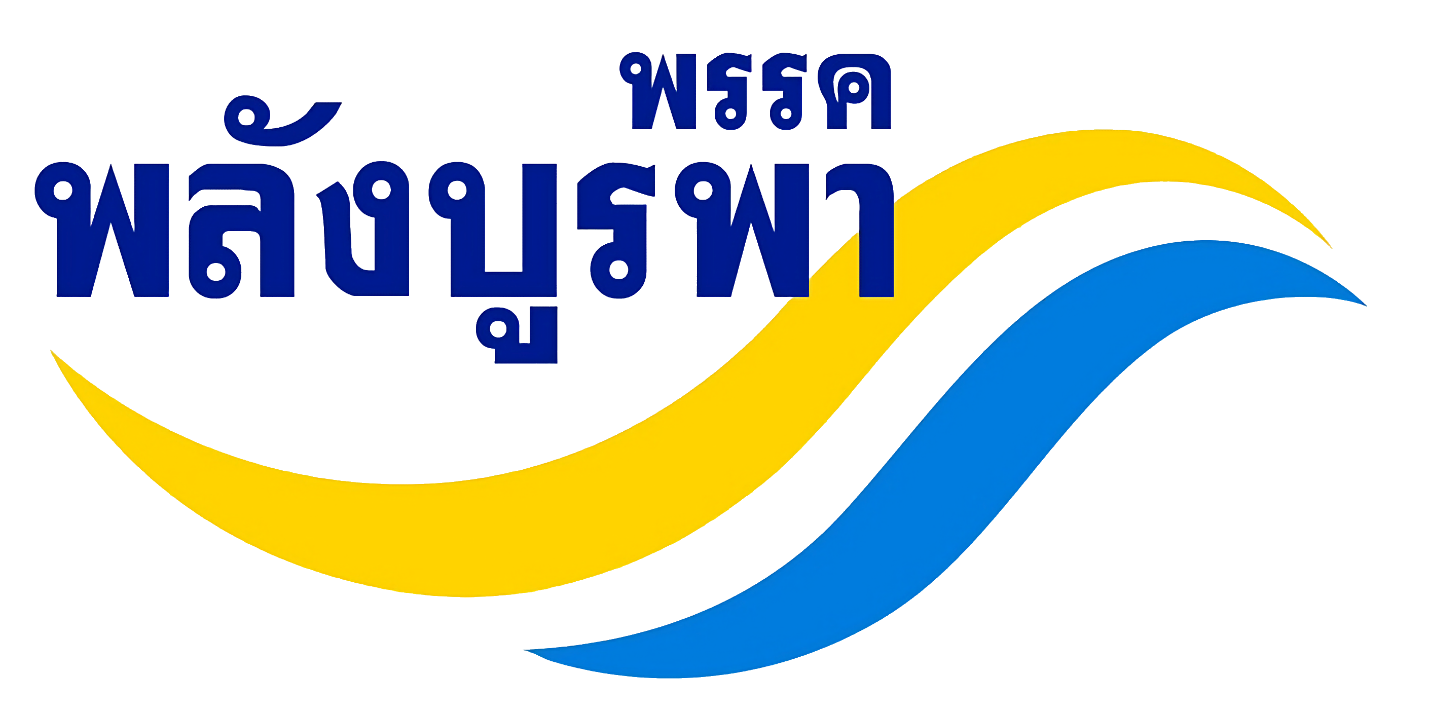
- Leader: Chao Maneewong
- Secretary-General: Pansak Ketwattha
- Founded: 4 May 2011
- Headquarters: Chonburi, Thailand
- Colors: Light blue
- Slogan: Honored the monarchy Upholding the people (เทิดทูนสถาบัน ยึดมั่นประชาชน)

Website
- http://www.phalangchon.or.th/

The Palang Burapha Party (Thai: พรรคพลังบูรพา), known as the Phalang Chon Party until 2023, is a political party in Thailand founded in 2011. It is based in Chonburi Province. The party's key figure is its "chief adviser" Sontaya Kunplome, former minister of tourism under Thaksin Shinawatra, who left the Bhumjaithai Party in 2011 to found the Phalang Chon Party. Formally, the party is chaired by Chao Maneewong.

In the 2011 general election, the party won seven seats: one party-list seat and six constituencies. All of the seats won represent Chonburi Province, Sontaya's home province and Phalang Chon's only stronghold. After the elections, the Phalang Chon Party agreed to participate in a five-party coalition government, dominated by the Pheu Thai Party and led by Yingluck Shinawatra. Sontaya's wife Sukumol Kunplome was given the post of culture minister in Yingluck's cabinet.

Later, on Tuesday, 24 January 2023, the Palang Chon Party held its 1/2023 general meeting to elect a new party executive committee to replace the old one whose term expired, along with amending the party's regulations, changing the name of the party to the Palang Burapha Party and ideology and party policies.
