= Assumption University of Thailand =

Private university in Bangkok, Thailand

- มหาวิทยาลัยอัสสัมชัญ (Thai)
- Educating Intelligence and Minds to Change the World
- Former names: Assumption School of Business (1969-1972); Assumption Business Administration College (1972-1990)
- Motto: Labor Omnia Vincit (Latin)
- Motto in English: Work conquers all things
- Type: Private, Catholic university
- Established: 1969; 57 years ago
- Founder: Montfort Brothers of St. Gabriel
- Religious affiliation: Roman Catholic (Gabrielite Brothers)
- Academic affiliations: ACUCA, ASAIHL, AUN, IFCU, UMAP, UNAI
- Chairman: Rev. Bro.Dechachai Sripicharn, f.s.g.
- President: Rev. Bro. Sirichai Fonseka, f.s.g., Ph.D.
- Vice-president: Rev. Bro. Dr. Verayuth Boonpram, f.s.g. (V.P.for Research and Academic Services); Rev. Bro. Dr. Monthol Prathumarach, f.s.g. (V.P. for Special Affairs); Bro. Amnuay Yoonprayong, f.s.g. (V.P. for Moral Development Education)
- Students: 8,110
- Location: 592/3 Soi Ramkhamhaeng 24 Ramkhamhaeng Rd., Hua Mak, Bangkok, Samut Prakan, Thailand; 13.756018°N 100.627617°E
- Campus: Suvarnbhumi Campus Huamark Campus City Campus
- Medium of Instruction: English
- Mascot: Steeds
- Website: www.au.edu

The Assumption University of Thailand (AU; Thai: มหาวิทยาลัยอัสสัมชัญ, also abbreviated ABAC) is a private, Catholic university in Bangkok, Thailand. It is administered by the Brothers of St. Gabriel.

== History ==
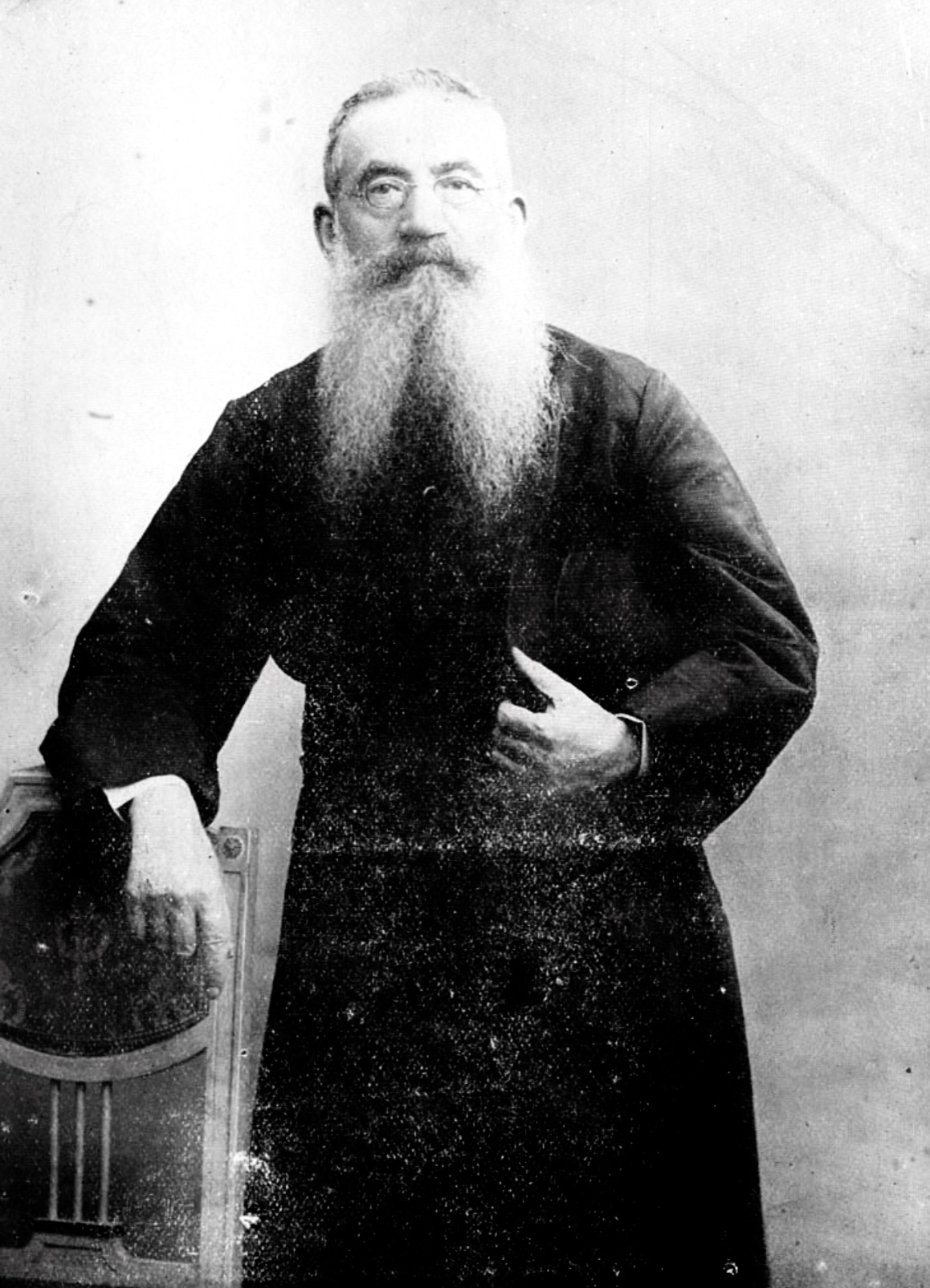
Rev. Fr. Emile August Colombet

Assumption University originated from Assumption Commercial College in 1969 as an autonomous higher education institution under the name of Assumption School of Business. It adopted the name from the precedent school "Assumption College" given by Rev. Fr. Emile August Colombet, a French missionary in Siam, in 1885.

Under the approval of the Ministry of Education in 1972, it was officially transformed into Assumption Business Administration College or ABAC and subsequently accredited by the Thai Ministry of University Affairs. Following the school's significant expansion to offer comprehensive programs in Bachelor's, Master's and Doctoral Degrees, in 1990, it was granted accordingly a new status as "Assumption University" by the Ministry of University Affairs.

== Faculty ==
Undergraduate Programs List

- School of Business and Management
- School of Arts
- School of Music
- School of Communication Arts
- School of Architecture and Design
- School of Engineering, Science and Technology
- School of Biotechnology
- School of Nursing Science
- School of Law
- School of Medicine

Graduate Program List

Master Degree programs

- School of Business and Advanced Technology Management
- School of Human Sciences
- School of Engineering, Science and Technology
- School of Management and Economics
- School of Law
- School of Biotechnology
- School of Music
- School of Nursing Science

Doctoral Degree Programs

- School of Business and Advanced Technology Management
- School of School of Human Sciences
- School of School of Management and Economics
- School of School of Engineering, Science and Technology
- School of School of Biotechnology
- School of Nursing Science

== Locations ==
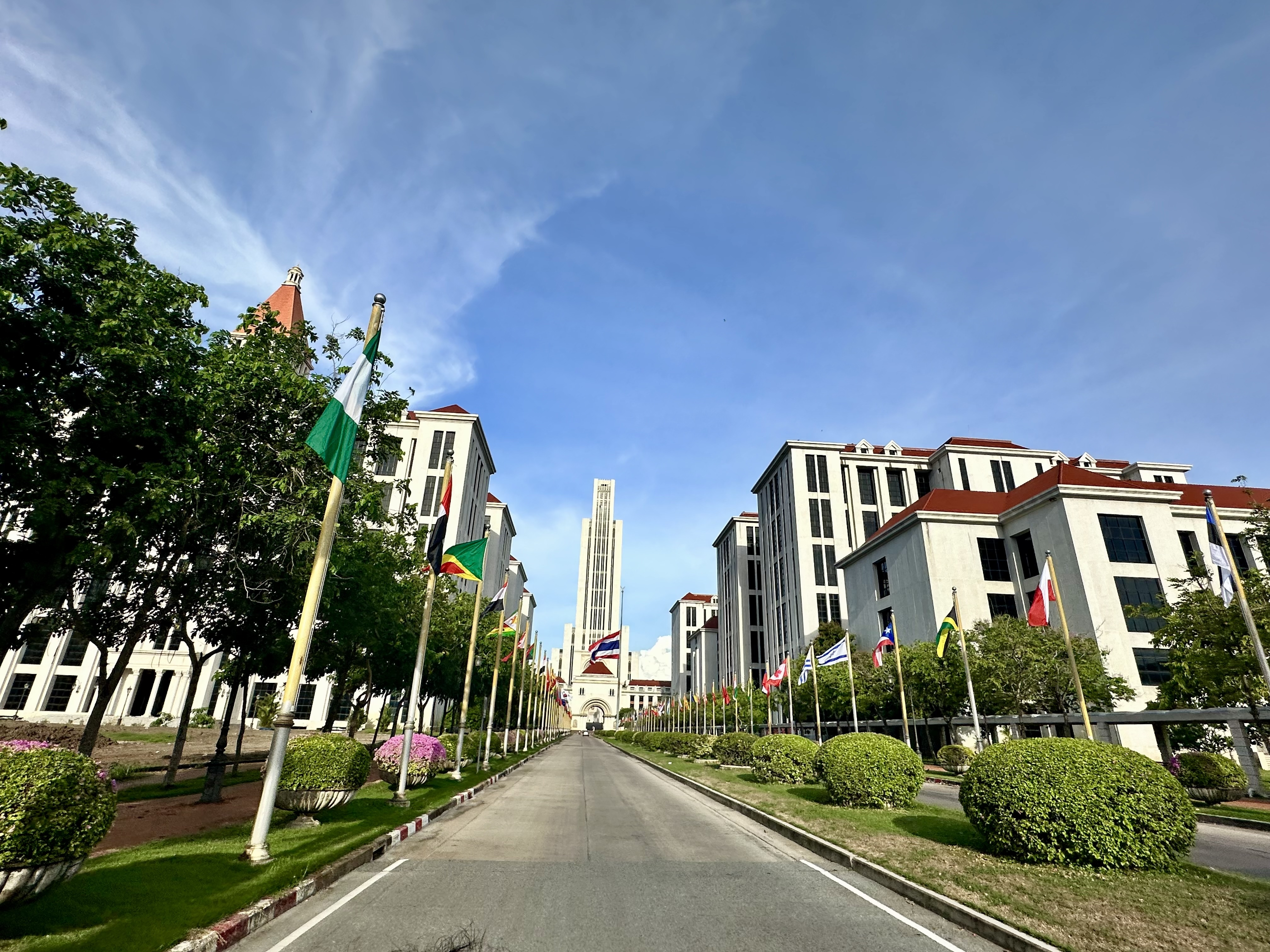
Assumption University Suvarnabhumi Campus

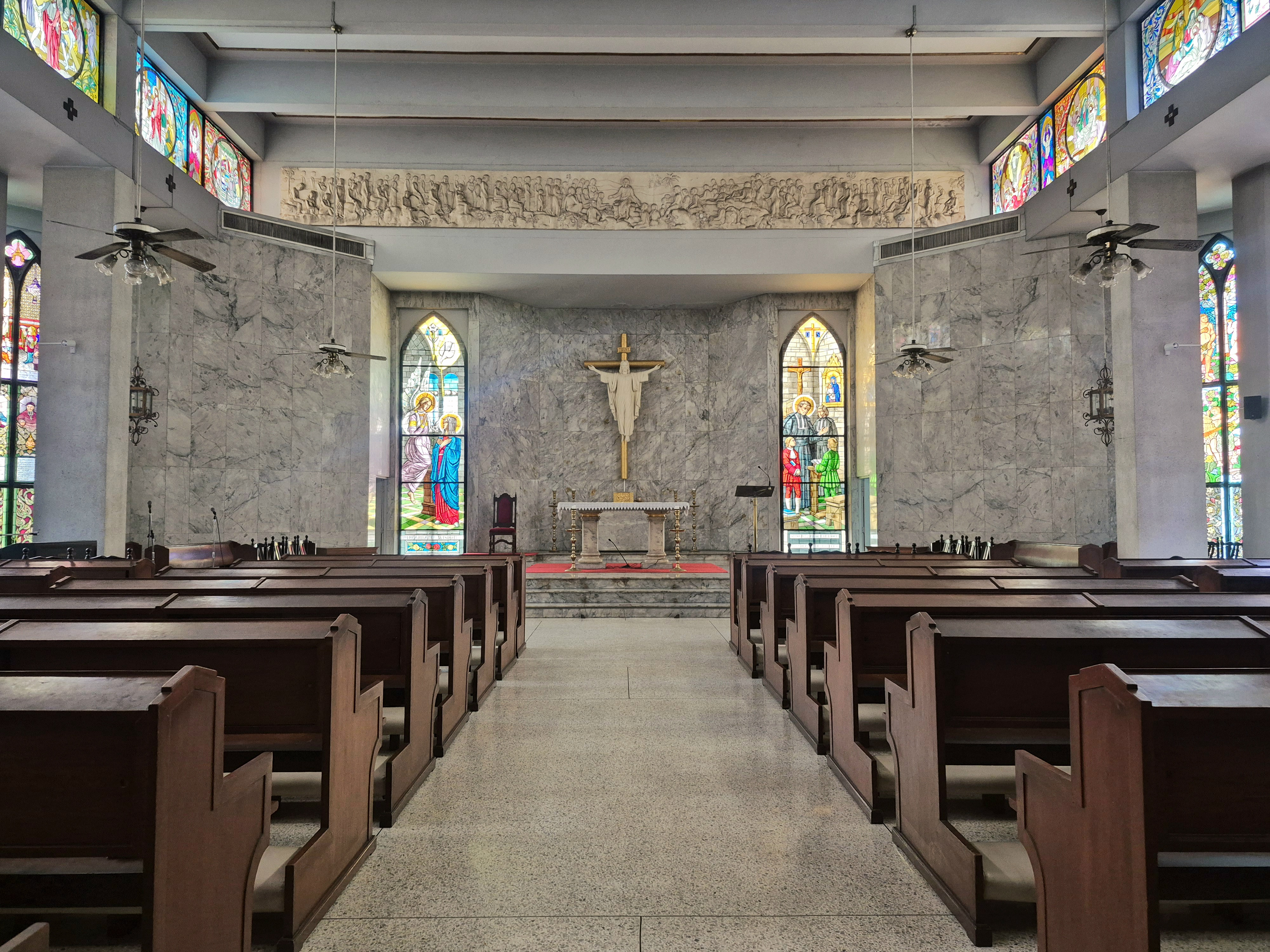
Chapel of the Annunciation, Hua Mak Campus.

- Suvarnabhumi Campus
- Hua Mak Campus

=== Chapel of the Annunciation ===
The Chapel of the Annunciation at the Hua Mak Campus serves as the principal place of Catholic worship on the university's original campus. Though architecturally modest, the chapel offers a solemn and contemplative environment for prayer and liturgical celebrations.

Dedicated to the Annunciation of the Lord, it commemorates the biblical event in which the Archangel Gabriel announced to the Virgin Mary that she would conceive Jesus Christ. The chapel is regularly used for Mass, Eucharistic adoration, and various university religious ceremonies. The chapel hosts daily Mass, one anticipated Sunday Mass on Saturday, and Sunday morning Masses in Thai, English, and Igbo.

The cornerstone of the chapel was blessed by Pope John Paul II during his visit to Thailand in May 1984. The chapel itself was later blessed by Michael Kitbunchu on 22 September 1984.

== Sedes Sapientiae: The Seat of Wisdom ==
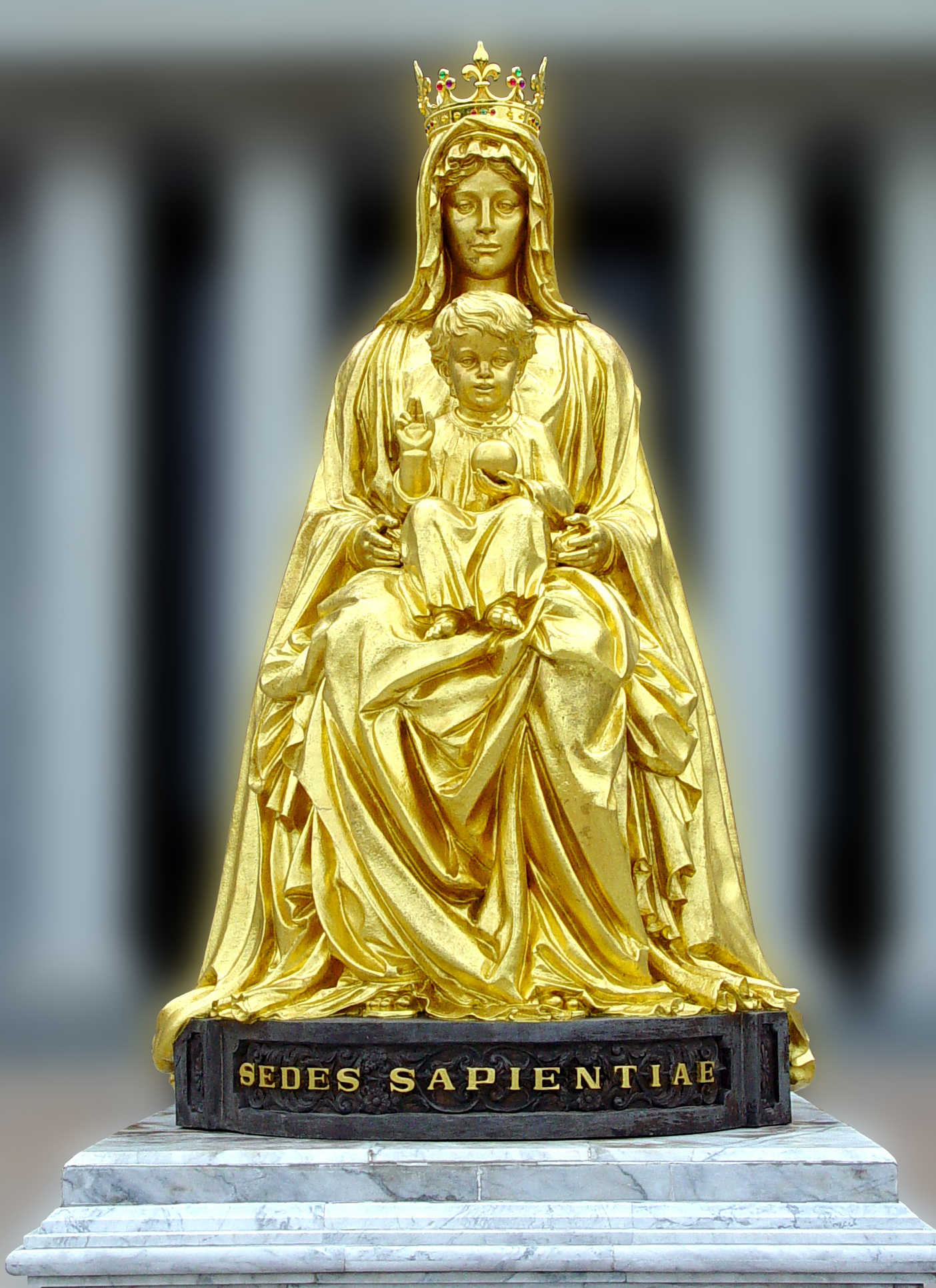
Sedes sapientiae

The university's Seat of Wisdom statue was blessed by Michael Cardinal Michai Kitbunchu on the 8th December 2000. A goldsmith was commissioned to craft a crown of pure gold for the statue of the Virgin Mary. On 15 August 2001, this gold crown was blessed by Bishop Lawrence Thienchai Samanchit.

== Accreditation ==
The university is accredited by OHEC (Office of Higher Education Commission), Thailand and ONESQA (Office for National Education Standards and Quality Assessment).

The university is also recognized by:

- The ASEAN Universities Network (AUN)
- The Association of Southeast Asian Institution of Higher Learning (ASAIHL)
- The Association of Christian Universities and Colleges in Asia (ACUCA)
- The Association of Southeast Asian Institution of Higher Learning (ASAIHL)
- The International Federation of Catholic Universities (IFCU)
- The U.S. Veterans Administration, Washington D.C.
- The United Nations Academic Impact (UNAI)

== Institutions and research centers ==
- ABAC Consumer Index
- ABAC Innovation, Creativity and Enterprise (ICE Center)
- ABAC Business Legal and Advisory Center
- ABAC SIMBA (ABAC Social Innovation in Management and Business Analysis)
- Confucius Institute
- ODI (Organization Development Institute)
- PAN AM International Flight Academy
- Tsinghua – ABAC AEC Research Institute
- Institute for Research and Academic Services (IRAS)

== Notable alumni ==
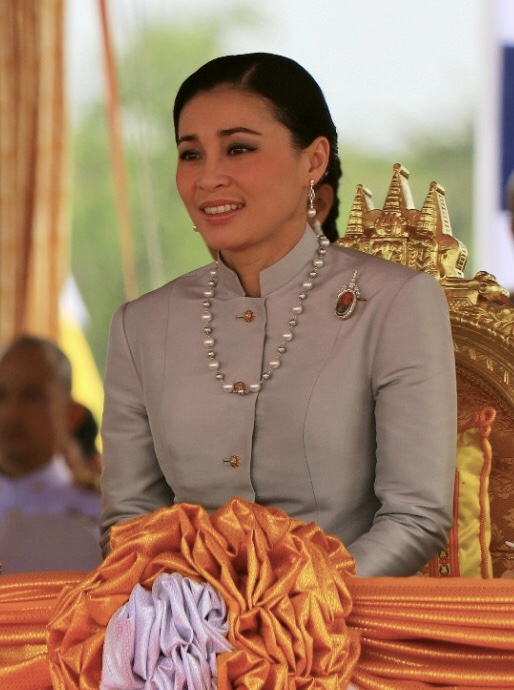
Her Majesty, Queen Suthida
- Her Majesty, Queen Suthida Bajrasudha Bimalalakshana, the Queen of Thailand
- Jiraporn Sindhuprai, Minister Attached to the Prime Minister's Office
- Trinuch Thienthong, former Education Minister
- Sabida Thaiseth, Deputy Minister of Interior
- Sukumol Kunplome, former Culture Minister
- Jennifer Harhigh, Deputy Chief of Mission at the U.S. Mission to the UN Agencies in Rome
- Gawin Caskey, singer and actor
- JingJing Yu, singer and actress
