= Poramet Ngampichet =

Thai politician

- ปรเมศวร์ งามพิเชษฐ์

Mayor of Pattaya City
- Incumbent
- Assumed office 22 May 2022
- Preceded by: Sontaya Kunplome

Personal details
- Born: 29 November 1972 (age 53) Chonburi, Thailand
- Other political affiliations: Rao Rak Pattaya

Poramet Ngampichet (Thai: ปรเมศวร์ งามพิเชษฐ์, RTGS: Poramet Ngamphichet) is a Thai politician, serving as Mayor of Pattaya City, Thailand, since 2022.

== Electoral history ==
Poramet was elected Mayor of Pattaya City in the 2022 Pattaya City local elections. He ran as a member of the Rao Rak Pattaya party, and won with 39.2% of the vote.

== Career ==
Poramet previously served as a Member of the House of Representatives for Chonburi, and as an adviser to the culture minister.

Poramet has pushed to finished the Eastern Seaboard Stadium.
