= Itthiphol Khunpluem =

Thai politician (born 1973)

- อิทธิพล คุณปลื้ม
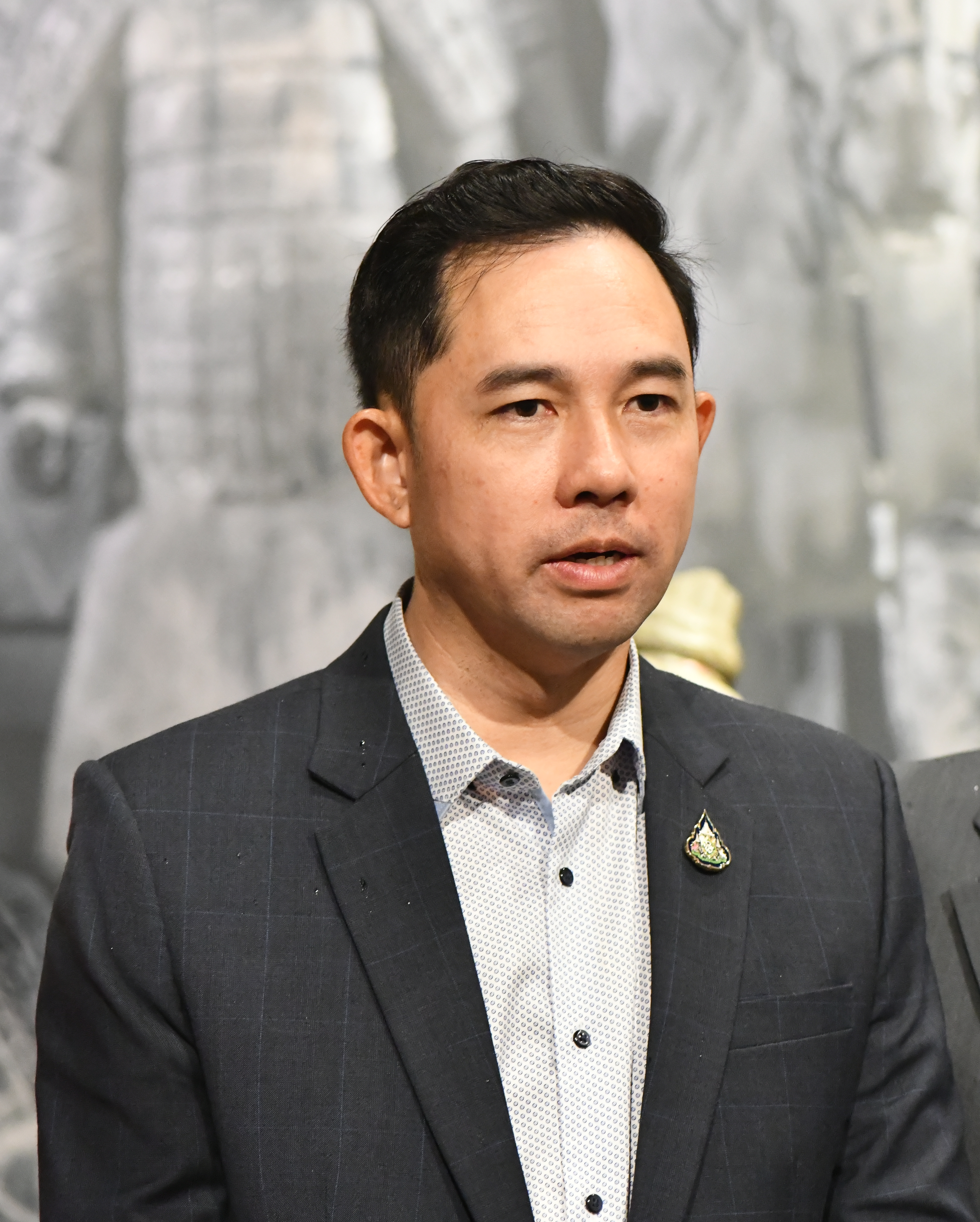
- Itthiphol on 14 September 2019

Minister of Culture
- In office 10 July 2019 – 1 September 2023
- Prime Minister: Prayut Chan-o-cha
- Preceded by: Veera Rojpojanarat
- Succeeded by: Sermsak Pongpanich

Mayor of Pattaya City
- In office 4 May 2008 – 16 June 2016
- Preceded by: Niran Watanasatsathorn
- Succeeded by: Chanatpong Sriwiset

Personal details
- Born: 15 December 1973 (age 52) Chonburi, Thailand
- Party: United Thai Nation Party
- Spouse: Ratchada Chatikavanij
- Parent: Somchai Khunpluem (father)
- Relatives: Sontaya Kunplome (brother); Wittaya Khunpluem (brother)
- Education: Chulalongkorn University; Golden Gate University

Itthiphol Khunpluem (Thai: อิทธิพล คุณปลื้ม, RTGS: Itthiphon Khunpluem; born 15 December 1973) is a Thai politician who served as Minister of Culture in the second cabinet of Prime Minister Prayut Chan-o-cha from July 2019 to September 2023, and as Mayor of Pattaya from 2008 to 2016.

== Early life and education ==
Itthiphol is the son of Somchai Khunpluem ("Kamnan Poh") and Satil Khunpluem. He graduated from Assumption College Sriracha and high school from Suankularb Wittayalai School. He graduated with a bachelor's degree Bachelor of Laws from the Faculty of Law, Chulalongkorn University and master's degree Master of Laws from Golden Gate University, USA.

== Political careers ==
Itthiphol was a member of the House of Representatives of Chon Buri Province for 2 terms from 2001 until 2008, having served as an advisor to several ministries such as the Ministry of Transport, Ministry of Interior, Ministry of Commerce, Ministry of Science and Technology, and Ministry of Tourism and Sports. Later, he turned to work in local politics by running for election as mayor of Pattaya City and was elected for 2 terms.

In 2018, he joined the Palang Pracharath Party and ran for election in the Chonburi area in the general election of members of the Thai House of Representatives 2019 but was not elected. Later in the year 2019, he was appointed as the Minister of Culture in the government of Prime Minister Prayut Chan-o-cha. In June 2021, he was elected to the executive committee of the Palang Pracharath Party.

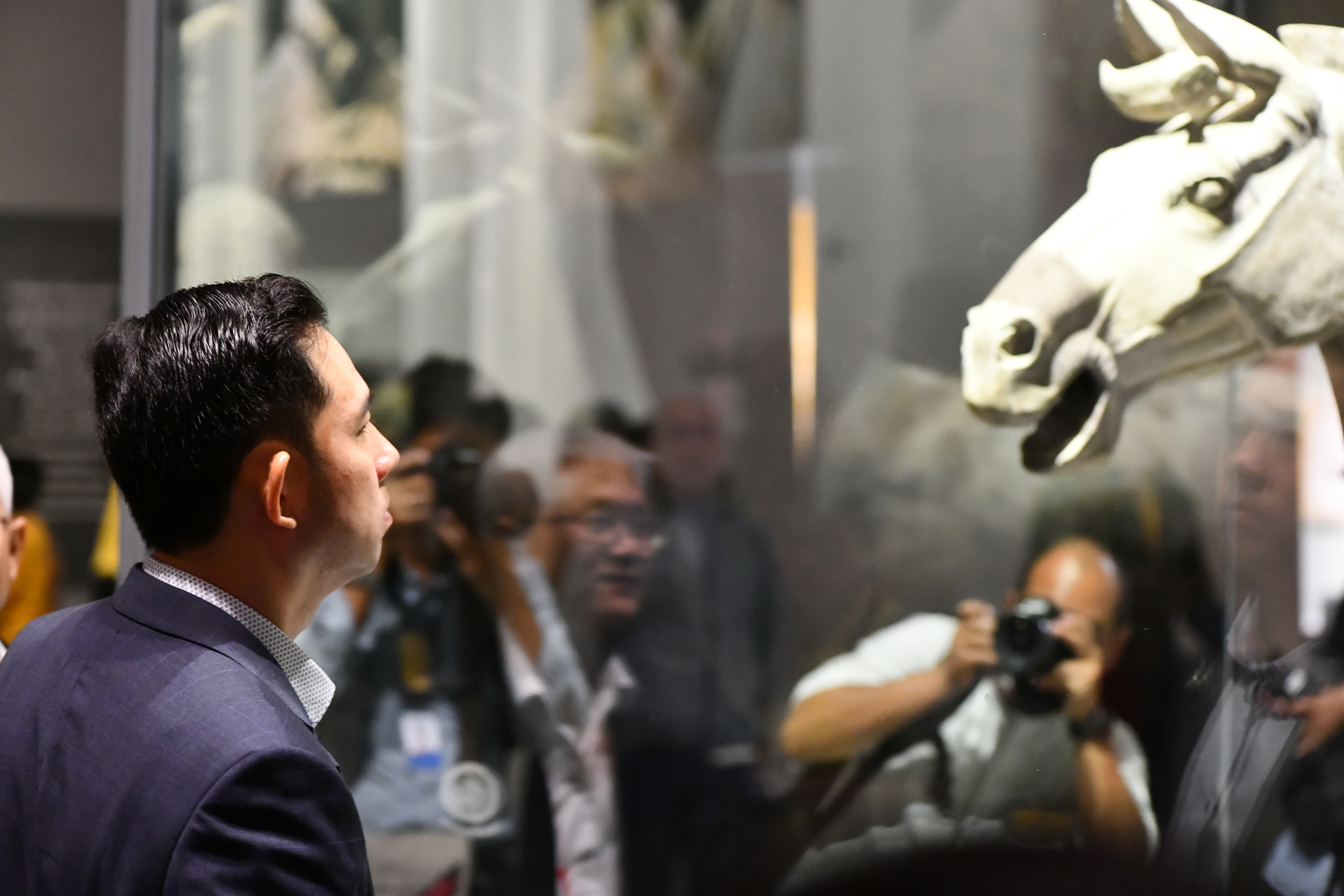
Itthiphol at the Qin Shi Huang The First Emperor of China and Terracotta Warriors Exhibition in 2019

== Minister of Culture ==
On 10 July 2019, Itthiphol was appointed Minister of Culture by Prayut Chan-o-cha as the Minister of Culture.

On 30 September 2019, he attended the Phuket Vegetarian Festival in place of Prayut, where he presided over the opening ceremony and led a prayer ceremony.

On 31 May 2021, two ancient sandstone lintels stolen during the Vietnam War from Thailand and smuggled to the United States, were repatriated from the United States to the National Museum in Bangkok. Presumed to date back to the 10th or 11th century from Buriram and Sa Kaeo provinces, they display the Hindu deities of Indra and Yama and had been displayed at the Asian Art Museum in San Francisco, until an investigation by the Department of Homeland Security led to its return to Thailand. The artifact return was marked by a traditional ceremony attended by Itthiphol who thanked American authorities.

On 18 February 2022, he discussed furthering cultural ties between Thailand and Bahrain with the Bahraini ambassador to Thailand, Mona Abbas Mahmoud Radhi.

On 9 November 2022, he spoke on how the Thai film Hanuman White Monkey, which revolves around the Hindu god Hanuman and contains Khon performance, will help preserve Thai cultural heritage.

== Arrest ==
On 25 July 2023, the National Anti-Corruption Commission found enough evidence to believe Itthiphol broke the law under Section 157 of the Criminal Code over his approval of The Waterfront Suites and Residence in 2008. The case was then forwarded to the Criminal Court for Corruption and Misconduct Cases. On 5 September 2023, the Court approved an arrest warrant for Itthiphol. However, he had fled to Cambodia on 30 August, but returned to Thailand on October 9, where he was arrested by authorities at Suvarnabhumi airport after surrendering. Itthiphol is currently facing charges of misfeasance.

== Honors and awards ==
- (Philippines) Order of the Knights of Rizal - (April 2011)

Political offices
Preceded by Veera Rojpojanarat	Minister of Culture; 2019–present	Incumbent
