= Ministry of Culture (Thailand) =

Government ministry of Thailand

- กระทรวงวัฒนธรรม
- Seal of the Illumed Baldachin

- Flag of the Illumed Baldachin

Ministry overview
- Formed: 12 March 1952 (first established); 3 October 2002 (re-established)
- Preceding Ministry: Ministry of Culture (1952–1958)
- Jurisdiction: Government of Thailand
- Headquarters: Huai Khwang, Bangkok
- Annual budget: 8,209.4 million baht (FY2019)
- Minister responsible: Sabida Thaiseth, Minister
- Ministry executive: Prasop Riangngoen, Permanent Secretary
- Website: www.m-culture.go.th/en

The Ministry of Culture (Abrv: MOC; Thai: กระทรวงวัฒนธรรม, RTGS: Krasuang Watthanatham) is a Thai government body responsible for the oversight of culture, religion, and art in Thailand. Its FY2019 budget is 8,209.4 million baht.

The current minister in charge is Sabida Thaiseth.

== History ==
The Division of Culture was established in 1938 under the Department of Fine Arts. In 1952 it became the Ministry of Culture with the Department of Fine Arts as a subordinate agency. In 1958 it was renamed the Division of Culture and placed under the aegis of the Ministry of Education (MOE). In 2002, it was re-established as the Ministry of Culture.

In July 2019, Itthiphol Khunpluem, a former mayor of Pattaya, was appointed Minister of Culture.

=== Ministry of Culture and Tourism ===
On June 16, 2026, Sabida Thaiseth, Minister of Culture, revealed the progress in transferring tourism-related responsibilities from the Ministry of Tourism and Sports to the Ministry of Culture, stating that the process was proceeding smoothly without delay. She had assigned Prasop Riangngern, Permanent Secretary of the Ministry of Culture, to coordinate with the Office of the Public Sector Development Commission (OPSDC) to ensure the transfer of responsibilities is completed within the set six-month timeframe.

Furthermore, on June 23, 2026, the Minister of Culture is scheduled to hold discussions with the Ministry of Tourism and Sports, as well as five other relevant central agencies: the Office of the Public Sector Development Commission (OPSDC), the Civil Service Commission (CSC), the Office of the National Economic and Social Development Council (NESDC), the Ministry of Finance, and the Office of the Council of State, to drive the implementation of the aforementioned plan.

Later, on June 18, 2026, Surasak Panjaroenvorakul, the Minister of Tourism and Sports, revealed the progress of the draft bill on the restructuring of ministries, departments, and agencies. The key aspect of this would be the merger of ministries, with tourism responsibilities being moved to the Ministry of Culture to form the "Ministry of Culture and Tourism," and the establishment of a new ministry under the name "Ministry of Sports."

Regarding the details of the restructuring, including asset allocation, personnel, staffing levels, and internal agencies, as well as the definition of additional missions for the new ministry, it is necessary to gather feedback from relevant civil servants before proceeding. This process is currently underway as the Office of the Civil Service Commission (OCSC) is preparing to submit the draft bill to the Cabinet for approval before submitting it to the House of Representatives. It is expected to be submitted to the Cabinet sometime between June and July 2026.

This meeting was held in accordance with the resolution of the Civil Service Commission (CSC) meeting No. 3/2026 on May 19, 2026. The meeting approved guidelines for restructuring government agencies based on new missions to increase efficiency in public administration. Key aspects include transferring and redistributing functions of government agencies, assigning all tourism-related tasks primarily to the Ministry of Culture and Tourism to achieve concrete integration in cultural and tourism promotion. Simultaneously, sports-related tasks were assigned primarily to the newly established Ministry of Sports to clarify and streamline the management of national sports development. Furthermore, the meeting approved in principle the draft Act amending the Ministries, Departments, and Agencies Act (No. ...) B.E. .... to serve as the legal mechanism to support these changes in authority and organizational structure, ensuring compliance with legal procedures and alignment with national development strategies.

On June 25, 2026, Pakorn Nilapraphan, Deputy Prime Minister for Legal Affairs revealed the progress of the draft Act amending the Ministries, Departments, and Agencies Act, stating that the drafting of the law was complete. On June 24, 2026, the Office of the Civil Service Commission (OCSC) sent the draft law to the Cabinet Secretariat to circulate and solicit opinions on management from two relevant agencies.

It is expected that the process will take no more than one month before being submitted to the Cabinet for consideration in July or August 2026. Following this, it will proceed to parliamentary review. Based on the planned timeline, the draft law is anticipated to be enacted within 2026.

On June 29, 2026, Weerasak Kowsurat, Chief Advisor to the Deputy Prime Minister and former Minister of Tourism and Sports, proposed the establishment of a "Tourism Economics Office" within the Ministry of Culture and Tourism to serve as the primary agency for analyzing data and formulating structural policies.

On July 1, 2026, Prasop Riangngern, Permanent Secretary of the Ministry of Culture, and Natthriya Thaweevong, Permanent Secretary of the Ministry of Tourism and Sports, along with executives from both ministries, held a meeting at the Ministry of Tourism and Sports to prepare for the implementation of the draft Act on the Restructuring of Ministries, Departments, and Agencies, which the Office of the Public Sector Development Commission is currently submitting to the Cabinet. The meeting exchanged information on the structure, missions, staffing, budget, and performance of both ministries, including their affiliated agencies, state enterprises, and public organizations. They also discussed the transfer of tourism-related responsibilities to the Ministry of Culture and Tourism, and the preparation of personnel, budget, systems, laws, assets, information technology, and relevant data to ensure a smooth and efficient transition without disrupting public services. Furthermore, the meeting agreed to establish a joint working group between the two ministries to coordinate, integrate information, conduct detailed analyses, and make proposals in collaboration with central agencies. This group will also drive communication efforts to build knowledge, understanding, and accurate awareness among personnel, the media, network partners, and the public to foster confidence and support operations during the transition period.

Later, on July 2, 2026, Surasak revealed that the Office of the Civil Service Commission would submit the draft bill on the restructuring of ministries, departments, and agencies to the Cabinet meeting, possibly as early as July 7, 2026.

== Departmental organisation ==
- Office of the Minister
- Office of the Permanent Secretary
- Provincial Culture Office
- Religion Affairs Department
- Fine Arts Department
  - National Library of Thailand
  - National Archives of Thailand is a Thai government agency under Fine Arts Department, established in 1916 (B.E. 2459) as a section of National Library of Thailand. It has functioned as a division of the Fine Arts department since 1952 (B.E. 2495).
  - Performing Arts Office
- Department of Culture Promotion

- Film Censorship Board (FCB)

- Office of Contemporary Art and Culture
- Bunditpatanasilpa Institute

=== Associated organizations ===
- Princess Maha Chakri Sirindhorn Anthropology Centre
- Thai Film Archive
- Moral Promotion Center
- Office of Media Fund

== History of the Thai Nation ==
Thailand's military junta was criticized for a history textbook it ordered written by the Fine Arts Department of the ministry. The book, History of the Thai Nation, claims that the military has established "true democracy" in Thailand and has eliminated corruption. In 2015 the ministry's Fine Arts Department published History of the Thai Nation (Thai: ประวัติศาสตร์ชาติไทย; RTGS: prawat sat chat thai) at the order of the National Council for Peace and Order (NCPO). The NCPO wanted a new history book covering the past 400 years to foster "national reconciliation". The book was written in two months. On page 195, the text reads, "Gen Prayut Chan-o-cha as Prime Minister has carried out a policy of reforming the country, reforming politics to be truly a democracy, eliminating corruption and using moral principles to lead the country to be truly a democracy." On page 197 it goes on to say, "After the coup d'etat, Gen Prayut became prime minister. He has tried to develop the country and reform Thai politics into a real democracy. Gen Prayut has used moral principles and stamped out corruption to return democracy to the country." The book maintains that the NCPO was forced to stage the 2014 coup to end the political chaos caused by the civilian government of the time. Ten thousand copies of the book were published at a cost of one million baht. Twenty copies autographed by Prayut were sold at the launch. In November 2017, the prime minister ordered the Fine Arts Department to send 100 copies of the book to each of Thailand's provinces. A leading critic of the junta charged that, "The content of the book is misleading and it will lead to the distortion of the country's history [if not corrected]." The culture ministry plans to translate the book to English for distribution to Thai embassies worldwide.

== See also ==
- Cabinet of Thailand
- List of Government Ministers of Thailand
- Government of Thailand
