= Thai land law =

Law of real property in Thailand

Thai land law is the law of real property in Thailand. It begins by the Deed Law 1901 for only property rights. The first land law is the Town and Country Planning Act in 1952 by Phibun under the Ministry of Interior. Town Planning Act of 1975 is the current urban planning law.

== Deed Law (1901) ==
Siam slowly adopted an ownership concept in the modern sense, shifting from the corvée system or "Prai" which was property rights over human to property rights over land. Phasing out legal slavery from 1874 to 1905, the Franco-Siamese War in 1893, wage labour of Chinese migrant influx during the period of the European colonisation of Southeast Asia resulted in the first deed law in the history of Thailand in 1901 to protect an agriculture land rights. This caused the aristocratic Siamese elites such as the kings and the nobles gave up control over human, ability to control land around Bangkok also dropped. The landholding status of the elites disintegrated later but they have retained some of the most valuable land to control under this system. After 1909, very few title deeds were issued outside of the Central Region up to the 1940s.

Deed mentioned in Three Seals Law dated back to 1805 in form of land taxation system. The kings could call lands back to king's ownership before 1901.

The Ministry of Kasettrathikarn led by Chaophraya Thewet Wongwiwat (MR Lan Kunchon) in 1901. Ronald Worthy Giblin from Royal Thai Survey Department responded for mapping. Phraya Prachasheep Boriban responded for deed issuing. Land owner must point out a land border by the Torrens System which implemented in Australia.

== Phra Nakhorn Planning (1928) ==
The first attempt on making of Thai land law began in 1928 when King Prajadhipok established seven committees to study and making the Phra Nakhorn Planning within the modern day Phra Nakhon district, but it failed because the lack of expertise and research.

== Town Planning Division (1935) ==
Three years after the Siamese revolution of 1932, in 1935, Phraya Pakit Kolasart, Chief Engineer, started the Town Planning Division (TPD) under Luang Burakam Kowit (หลวงบุรกรรมโกวิท) of the Department of Public Work (DPW). In 1937, the TPD was briefly promoted to Department status, but in 1942, the TPD was demoted back to a Division and changed to the Technical and Town Planning Division.

In 1944, Pridi Banomyong led, the TPD was re-established as a Division within the Department of Public and Municipal Works, which was placed under the Prime Minister.

Urban planning areas in Siam were promulgated on some areas without a national planning law. Special area developments such as the Ratchadamnoen Avenue plan of 1939 in Bangkok, the new capital city plan of 1942 in Saraburi province, the military center plan in Lopburi province, and Yala City planning were promulgated by several land expropriation acts by Phibun government. Anyway most of plans were canceled such as Saraburi plan.

== Town and Country Planning Act (1952) ==
Five years after the 1947 Thai coup d'état, in 1952, the first national land law in the history of Thailand, Town and City Planning Act 1952 (TCPA) was enacted under Phibun. The law was signed by King Bhumibol Adulyadej in 1954, two years after the government was approved. Noppanan Tapananon saw that it was influenced by the United Kingdom's Town and Country Planning Act 1944 which was a double tier system. The law was ignored by the governments since it enacted, because the lack of financial support. The only result from the TCPA 1952 was the planning of Tambon Nai Mueang, Mueang Surin district in Surin province after the fire damage.

The TCPA 1952 designated the MoI Minister to select the Planning Committees with an approval of the Cabinet of Thailand. The Planning Committees who responsible for initiating and giving out comments for projects were Department of Public Works and Town & Country Planning Chief, as the president, Department of Health Chief, Department of Highways Chief, State Railway of Thailand Governor, and other ten specialists.

Municipality mayors and provincial governors or chief district officers were only local managers for the central government. There were criteria to qualify for local planning such as new city planning, damaged city renewal from fire, earthquake, other disasters, and for urban renewal or country renewal for well-being. When the planning was done, the MoI Minister was the person responsible for enacting the plans. The law allowed local bureaus to enforce land expropriation and land readjustment power in the local plan.

LWBA & AHG consultant in 1960, summarized it as an "action" bill. There is no planning for long-term but only for reconstruction and construction for cities, no adequate financing for the process of making programs. Municipal areas do not have enough budget and planning specialist.

== Land Code Act (1954) ==
The Land Code Act of 1954 replaced the Deed Law of 1901 by Plaek Phibunsongkhram government without the concept of land use planning, instead focusing on rights of land. The law provides different kinds of title deeds to be accepted by financial institutions. The NS2 is a temporary certificate. The NS3 is a transferable utilization certificates. The NS4 is a full land title, known as 'Chanot'. The reason was to counter the threat of communism.

Most of low grade deeds often used by officials, profiteers to stake out unoccupied forest for sale or to transfer to the rich. Land titling process favored investors and speculators over villagers. Peasants often fear for powerful individuals.

It unified the many disparate land legislation since 1901. It also limit a land ceiling at maximum of 50 Rai per person for agricultural use, 10 Rai for industrial use, 5 Rai for commercial use, 5 Rai for residential use, but the ceiling did not apply retroactively. As for foreigners, there were lower ceiling.

The local land administrations were built in 1955 for the first time in Thailand history. Phibun stated that this strategy would protect the peasant society's rice fields from communism threat.

The land ceiling for Thais were repealed by Sarit Thanarat regime in 1959. Within 1966, the title deeds were issued more than 160,000 Rai with the new survey methods such as an aerial survey.

== Greater Bangkok Plan 1960 ==
In 1955, Mungkorn Promyodhi, Mayor of Bangkok Municipality, asked the United States Operations Mission to Thailand (USOM) for city planning assistance. The MoI's Department of Municipal and Public Works (DMPW) and Town Planning Division (TPD) led the project for Thai government, by Luang Yuktasevi Vivat and Preeya Chimchom. The Greater Bangkok involves Bangkok Municipality and Thonburi Municipality, led by both Chief of City Planning Section, Prasert Navaratana and Chalitpakorn Virapalin.

In 1956, the City Planning Section of Bangkok and Thon Buri Municipality was created. Combining both areas, it was called the Greater Bangkok.

In 1957, the military junta of Sarit Thanarat and Thanom Kittikachorn signed a contract with the New York firms, Litchfield Whiting Bowne & Associates (LWBA) which was the LaPierre, Litchfield & Partners's name for oversea projects. Clarence B. Litchfield was a specialist in prison design and academic building design. His works are James J. Peters VA Medical Center, United States Merchant Marine Academy. Edmund Whiting was a hospital planner. Sidney B. Bowne was civil engineer.

The comprehensive plan of Bangkok municipality and Thonburi municipality in time frame from 1960 to 1990, called by Thai government as the Litchfield Plan 1990. In fact, the full report title is the Greater Bangkok Plan 1960 which was not only created by the LWBA (Litchfield), but included Adams Howard & Greeley (AHG) that led by Frederick J. Adams. He was a city planner, a head of American Planning Association, and a head of the department of city and regional planning at the Massachusetts Institute of Technology. Adams helped India, Thailand and Puerto Rico making city plan as well as Government Center, Boston and Rye, New York master plan.

The Plan criticized that the TCPA 1952 was not an actual planning law but it was a law of building enforcement without a planning framework. It is considered as the first Bangkok Metropolitan Region (BMR) and Thailand's comprehensive urban plan. The "Comprehensive Plan" definition from LWBA & AHG is not only series of maps but it consists of a statement of the entire set of policies, principles, assumptions and reasoning on the proposal plans. It is flexible and changeable for new public policies. It is a guide for future physical environment decisions. The objective of this report is to insure that the money to be spent for improvements will be spent smartly, for the great interest of the people, to make Bangkok into best city from available resources. Due to LWBA & AHG did not finish a planning study in time frame of 2 years, such as floor area ratio (FAR) study is missing.

From 1957 to 1962, there were ten projects constructed according to the Greater Bangkok Plan, such as street construction and widening in Bangkok, Bangkok - Saraburi Highway, moving rail freight operation to Bang Sue Junction railway station, emergency water supply system, moving slaughter house and heavy industries out of city, new airport site selected, clearance of area near Chitlada Palace for international government buildings, regional development programs for the Northern and Southern of Thailand to stop migration to Bangkok, sewer and water engineering, and industrial land use classification.

In the end, most of the planning was not implemented, as Sarit Thanarat cabinet ignored and distorted contents for their own benefits, but urban planning in general became more aware to Sarit regime because of a support from Luang Yuktasevi Vivat. In 1961, the DMPW led by Luang Yuktasevi Vivat proposed policies to Sarit cabinet, firstly, to implement land use planning for Bangkok and Thon Buri, secondly, to promote TPD from Division to Department. The Town and Country Planning (DTCP) quickly established in 1962 with only eleven employees transferred from Bangkok and Thon Buri municipalities and Public Works Department Town Planning Office. In 1971, the DTCP revised the Greater Bangkok Plan because of the change of anticipated population of the Bangkok Metropolitan Region from 4.5 million to 6.5 million in the original plan.

== National Economic and Social Development Plans ==
In 1961, the 1st National Economic and Social Development Plans (NESDP), Sarit Thanarat formed the first formal development planning in Thailand, but urban planning was not included.

1972 Office of the National Economic and Social Development Council was formed. Thanom Kittikachorn formed The 3rd NESDP, covering the years 1972 to 1976, adds more macro planning and projects. Such as two regional planning projects for the Northeastern and Northern Region to promote economic growth and force Bangkok to slow down population growth.

Prem Tinsulanonda formed the 4th NESDP, covering the years 1977 to 1981. It promotes growth of secondary cities in the Northeastern such as Khon Kaen province, Udon Thani province, Nakhon Ratchasima province, and Ubon Ratchathani province, the Northern such as Chiang Mai province and Phitsanulok province, the Southern such as Songkhla and Phuket province, and the Eastern such as Chonburi province. It includes urban land use, infrastructure, services, and employment.

The 5th NESDP, covering the years 1982 to 1986, promotes the first phase of the Regional Cities Development Project for main cities such as Chiang Mai, Hat Yai, Chonburi, Nakhon Ratchasima. The Eastern seaboard of Thailand started by a 'corridor' policy for urban growth outside of Bangkok. The Bangkok Metropolitan Region Master Plan and Regional Plan also started in the 5th NESDP. It specifies agriculture zones and green zones. Mass transportation systems were promoted. Slums, infrastructure, and environment were planned to be improved.

== Town Planning Act (1975) ==
In 1959, the Ministry of Interior (MoI), Praphas Charusathien, established the Research Committees to oversee the new land law which based on the Litchfield Plan.

In 1961, Cyrus Nims, USOM official, proposed that the planning law scope should not define only the Great Bangkok area but whole country. Nims proposed several Drafts of Suggested City Planning Act within 1962. The Nims' drafts included the Comprehensive Plan and the Special Project Plan.

During the Cold War, military junta government did not finalize the new planning law until after the 1973 Thai popular uprising, the Town Planning Act of 1975 officially enacted by Sanya Dharmasakti government, replacing the TCPA 1952 law. For the Litchfield Plan, the government did not follow, their reason was that its population growth exceed the planning scope and the Town Planning Act of 1975 was not suitable. This act asserts to develop and legalize all 124 municipalities.

At the national level, there were the National Economic and Social Development Board (NESDB), DTCP, Department for Control of Changwat Governor under the MoI, and others such as local administrations. However local entities lack of specialists to create their own plan. The NESDB take care of national policies to scope the goals and objectives for five years terms to make guild lines for urban planning at all levels.

The DTCP under the MoI take care of the physical plan that derived from the NESDB plans from the regional to local level. The Town Planning Act of 1975 forces the DTCP to focus on an urban area with the Comprehensive Plan and the Specific Plan. It planned to make an agriculture land with a rural plan and a regional plan.

The provincial governors under the MoI take care of the Rural Plan from the government policy.

=== Planning system ===
There was a hierarchy of planning process from the National Plan of government, the Regional Plan and the Provincial Plan of the Regional Bureau, and the Comprehensive Plan and the Specific Plan.

- National Plan (NP) is a policy plan without legal status. It was responsible by the Cabinet, managed by the Office of Prime Minister, prepared by the NESDB. It was set to be revised every five years to be a guideline for the Regional Plan.
- Regional Plan (RP) is a policy plan without legal status for a period of five years. It was responsible by the MoI, prepared by the DTCP. There were details such as infrastructure, housing, finances, and flood protection. It was a guideline for the provincial and the municipal level as it was an internal use within the DTCP.
- Comprehensive Plan (CP) & Specific Plan (SP) are plans with legal status, if they are approved by the government. The CP is to be used as guidance for development within related areas for property, communication and transport, public service, and environment such as Nonthaburi Plan. The SP is to be approved by the government, to develop on specific area such as Laem Chabang in the Eastern seaboard of Thailand. Earlier in 1964, the CP and the SP were not called 'Plan' but 'Project'. The committees change to 'Plan' later in 1965.
- Municipal Plan (MP) is responsible by Thesaban (municipalities) but they were lack of specialists, eventually prepared by the DTCP or private consultant.

=== Criticism ===
Boonsirishuto, urban planner from local municipality, summarized problems of the Thai Urban Planning law of 1975 after the decentralisation began in the 1990s. Firstly, local administrations do not have sufficient resources to implement urban planning duty that have been transferred. Secondly, the process involves too many steps. Thirdly, people participation does not involve real stakeholders but the participants are enlisted people who required to meet bare minimum legal requirement. She suggests that the central government should support local governments to develop human resources, to provide useful tools, to transfer more budget, to make workable urban planning law, to support a policy making of chief of local government, to improve local government structure, and to communicate urban planning knowledge to local stakeholder. The most important policy is pushing the process of decentralization.

Roachanakanan pointed that the TPA 1975 is a poor planning regulation with some legal loopholes and containing a poor understanding and misleading of planning process, resulting in urban disaster such as great flood in 2011. He suggests lawmakers to eliminate a vagueness of the law and create a planning system, administrative system, and legal system balance. A performance indicator of planning official is quantity based without a real understanding of an environment. Central government power plays a conflict of interest role in urban planning without core concept from urban planning knowledge. Some academics proposed a conspiracy that politicians want the urban planning law to be weak to benefit powerful elites who are majority landowners.

In 1976, John Friedmann, the influential urban academic at the University of California, Berkeley commented that the TPA 1975 is not appropriate for Thailand as there are so many work process and taking too long to implement the plan, contradict to a fast-growth economic development of Thailand.

Integrating flood risk management into urban planning is the most important way to reduce risk from disaster like great flood in 2011 such as preparing a flood risk map for entire country.

Data inconsistency from the central government resulted in negative impacts on environmental, social, cultural, physical and mental health of urban area. Example, in Wat Ket, Chiang Mai, population density data from the DPT was vastly incorrect, 108 persons per Rai, but in reality, it was 7 persons per Rai. The DPT plan allowed the construction of high-density buildings such as high-rise commercial buildings and condominiums. Lack of local involvement in planning resulted in inappropriate zoning.

== 1980-1990 ==
In the 1980s to 1990s, the bureaucracy takes advantage of farmland and forest by tradition of royal powers over land such as naming dam, highland agriculture scheme, palace project with the Thai Royal Family. Preserving the dual class distinction between 'royal servant' and ordinary villagers. Royal privileged status of Siam Cement Group and Crown Property Bureau were benefited from property deals. Powerful family such as Sarasin family illegally developed a resort in prime protected forest land of Kanchanaburi province under the protection of two relatives, Royal Thai Police Chief and Deputy Prime Minister.

== Land readjustment law ==
In March 1992, the MoI approved principle of land readjustment for the first time in the history. The National Urban Land Readjustment Committee (NULRC) was created to oversee all land readjustment at the national level. The NULRC formed sub-committee to draft the new urban land readjustment law. Under the MoI power, the Office of Urban Land Readjustment was created from three institutes the NULRC, the Bangkok Metropolitan Urban Land Readjustment Committee (BMULRC), and the Provincial Land Readjustment Committees (PLRC).

Adunnirat suggests that there are three major problems of urban development in Thailand. Firstly, the process of project start point should be more variable that not only apply for just the city that damaged by disaster but for every cities from design thinking. Secondly, the lack of legal tools to support, thirdly, the lack of financial tools, both points should be solved by politicians by enacting a new urban planning or urban development law.

== 2019 ==
The National Economic and Social Development Board (NESDB) is responsible for the national planning policy, the National Economic and Social Development Plan. The Department of Public Works and Town and Country Planning (DPT) is in charge of the National Spatial Development Plan and all other plans at lower levels such as municipal planning.

The 5-year National Economic and Social Development Plans (NESDP) from the first to the twelfth version have been used as a framework for the national planning policy and as instructions for government organizations. These strategies focused on economic development particularly in the Bangkok Metropolitan Area (BMA) and other capital cities.

From 1961 to 1966, the first NESDP included the "Growth Center Theory" which urban planning revolves around important cities to reduce population movement to Bangkok. From 1977 to 1981, the fourth NESDP focused on spatial development such as "Regional Development." From 2002 to 2006, the ninth NESDP, it emphasised on a living and sustainable city but spatial development has gotten very little attention since the ninth plan.

The DPT started to design the planning throughout the nation in 2002, which concerned only at regional level to provincial level. Local area such as municipality or sub-district level were ignored.

There is no national-wide land use planning nor policy framework in Thailand, leads to institutional problems of planning process. The lack of frameworks has led to urban development depended by political leaders. Organizational problems such as lack of cooperation between government agencies, lack of urban planners at local level. The lack of intensity land law such as Floor area ratio has not been implemented except Bangkok, resulted in decreasing of economic development and infrastructure. Slow process of decentralisation resulted in the delay of budget transferring to local government.

Sangawongse, Fisher, and Prabudhanitisarn pointed that the Comprehensive Plan (CP) of Chiang Mai province has been inconsistent in implementation. The Regional Office of Department of Public Works and Town & Country Planning (DPT) in Chiang Mai could not enforce the CP because of legal issue. Local governments are not able to enforce the CP because of limitation of resources. Land use problems occurred because the CP ignored cultural, history, economic, and social element. The CP has ambiguous land use regulations, such as the high-rise buildings were permitted in the low-density zone.
