= List of provincial governors in Thailand =

This is a list of the current governors of provinces and special administrative regions of Thailand. In all 76 provinces, the governor is appointed by the Ministry of Interior. This is due to the centralised nature of Thailand's government which began during the reign of King Chulalongkorn from 1892 onwards. Chulalongkorn's centralisation also saw the replacement of local rulers, such as in Lan Na, with rulers appointed by the government. Appointed governors have sometimes been outsiders to their governing province.

Bangkok is a self-governing special administrative region and has directly elected its own governors since 1975. However, from 1977 to 1985, and 2014 to 2022, elections were suspended due to military junta rule whereby the governor was appointed by the Ministry of Interior. The only other area that directly elects its own leader is Pattaya, a special administrative region in Bang Lamung district of Chonburi province.

== List ==
=== Special Administrative Regions ===
Special Administrative Region	Officeholders	Party	Term	Took office	Office expires	Time in office
Bangkok (list)	Chadchart Sittipunt	Independent	First	22 May 2022	21 May 2026	3 years, 114 days
Pattaya	Poramet Ngampichet	Rao Rak Pattaya Group	First	22 May 2022	21 May 2026	3 years, 114 days

=== Provinces ===
Province	Officeholders	Took office	Time in office
Amnat Charoen	Thaweep Butpho	1 October 2020	4 years, 347 days
Ang Thong	Verasak Vichitsangsri	12 September 2021	4 years, 1 day
Bueng Kan	Sanit Khaosa-ard	1 October 2019	5 years, 347 days
Buriram	Thatchakorn Hatthathayakul	1 October 2018	6 years, 347 days
Chachoengsao	Maitree Traitilanan	1 October 2020	4 years, 347 days
Chai Nat	Rangsan Tancharoen	1 October 2021	3 years, 347 days
Chaiyaphum	Kraisorn Kongchalard	1 October 2021	3 years, 347 days
Chanthaburi	Suthee Thongyam	1 October 2020	4 years, 347 days
Chiang Mai	Nirat Pongsitthaworn	1 October 2022	2 years, 347 days
Chiang Rai	Puttipong Sirimart	1 October 2022	2 years, 347 days
Chonburi	Thawatchai Srithong	1 October 2022	2 years, 347 days
Chumphon	Teera Anantaseriwittaya	1 October 2020	4 years, 347 days
Kalasin	Songpol Jai-krim	1 October 2020	4 years, 347 days
Kamphaeng Phet	Chawalit Saeng-uthai	1 October 2018	6 years, 347 days
Kanchanaburi	Jirakiat Phumsawat	1 October 2017	7 years, 347 days
Khon Kaen	Somsak Jangtrakul	1 October 2017	7 years, 347 days
Krabi	Phutthiphong Sirimat	1 October 2021	3 years, 347 days
Lampang	Sithichai Jindaluang	1 October 2021	3 years, 347 days
Lamphun	Worayut Naowarat	1 October 2020	4 years, 347 days
Loei	Chaitawat Niemsiri	1 October 2020	4 years, 347 days
Lopburi (list)	Niwat Rungsakorn	1 October 2020	4 years, 347 days
Mae Hong Son	Akkawit Meepian	26 December 2024	263 days
Maha Sarakham	Kiattisak Trongsiri	1 October 2020	4 years, 347 days
Mukdahan	Chaloemphon Mangkhang	1 October 2021	3 years, 347 days
Nakhon Nayok	Amphon Angkapakornkun	1 October 2020	4 years, 347 days
Nakhon Pathom	Surasak Charoensirichot	1 October 2020	4 years, 347 days
Nakhon Phanom	Chathip Ruchanaseri	1 October 2021	3 years, 347 days
Nakhon Ratchasima	Wichian Chantaranothai	1 October 2021	3 years, 347 days
Nakhon Sawan	Chayan Sirimas	1 October 2021	3 years, 347 days
Nakhon Si Thammarat	Kraisorn Wisitwong	1 October 2020	4 years, 347 days
Nan	Akkawit Meepian	26 December 2024	4 years, 1 day
Narathiwat	Sanan Pongaksorn	1 October 2021	4 years, 1 day
Nong Bua Lamphu	Siwaporn Chuasawas	1 October 2020	4 years, 347 days
Nong Khai	Monsit Phaisanthanawat	1 October 2021	3 years, 347 days
Nonthaburi	Suchin Chaichumsak	1 October 2019	5 years, 347 days
Pathum Thani	Somkid Chanthomruk	17 November 2024	300 days
Pattani	Pateemoh Sadeeyamu	15 November 2022	2 years, 302 days
Phang Nga	Chamroen Thipphayaphongthada	1 October 2019	5 years, 347 days
Phatthalung	Ratthasat Chitchu	24 December 2024	263 days
Phayao	Chokdee Amornwat	25 May 2021	4 years, 111 days
Phetchabun	Krit Kongmuang	1 October 2020	4 years, 347 days
Phetchaburi	Pakapong Tawipat	15 June 2020	5 years, 90 days
Phichit	Paiboon Nabutchom	1 October 2021	3 years, 347 days
Phitsanulok	Ronnachai Chitwiset	1 October 2020	4 years, 347 days
Phra Nakhon Si Ayutthaya	Weerachai Nakmas	1 October 2021	3 years, 347 days
Phrae	Somwang Phuangbangpho	1 October 2020	4 years, 347 days
Phuket	Narong Woonsiew	15 June 2020	5 years, 90 days
Prachinburi	Woraphan Suwannus	1 October 2020	4 years, 347 days
Prachuap Khiri Khan	Vacant after the death of Niti Vivatvanich	19 December 2023	23 days
Ranong	Somkiat Sisanet	1 October 2020	4 years, 347 days
Ratchaburi	Ronnapop Luangpairote	1 October 2020	4 years, 347 days
Rayong	Channa Iamsaeng	1 October 2020	4 years, 347 days
Roi Et	Phusit Somchit	1 October 2021	3 years, 347 days
Sa Kaeo	Parinya Phothisat	1 October 2021	3 years, 347 days
Sakon Nakhon	Chureerat Thep-at	1 October 2021	3 years, 347 days
Samut Prakan	Wanchai Kongkasem	1 October 2020	4 years, 347 days
Samut Sakhon	Narong Rakroi	12 September 2021	4 years, 1 day
Samut Songkhram	Charas Bunnasa	1 October 2019	5 years, 347 days
Saraburi	Manrat Rattanasukhon	1 October 2018	6 years, 347 days
Satun	Sakra Kapilkan	18 September 2023	1 year, 360 days
Sing Buri	Chaichan Sittiwirattham	1 October 2021	3 years, 347 days
Sisaket	Watthana Phutthichat	1 October 2019	5 years, 347 days
Songkhla	Chotnarin Kerdsom	17 November 2024	300 days
Sukhothai	Wirun Phandevi	1 October 2020	4 years, 347 days
Suphan Buri	Natthapat Suwanprateep	1 October 2020	4 years, 347 days
Surat Thani (list)	Jessada Jitrat	1 October 2023	1 year, 347 days
Surin	Suvapong Kitiphatpiboon	1 October 2020	4 years, 347 days
Tak	Chucheep Pongchai	26 December 2024	263 days
Trang	Khajornsak Charoensopha	1 October 2020	4 years, 347 days
Trat	Chamnanwit Terat	1 October 2021	3 years, 347 days
Ubon Ratchathani	Pongrat Phiromrat	1 October 2021	3 years, 347 days
Udon Thani	Siam Sirimongkol	1 October 2020	4 years, 347 days
Uthai Thani	Khajonkiat Rakpanichmanee	12 September 2021	4 years, 1 day
Uttaradit	Phol Damtham	1 October 2020	4 years, 347 days
Yala	Supot Rodruang Na Nongkhai	29 April 2025	137 days
Yasothon	Chonlatee Yangtrong	1 October 2020	4 years, 347 days
