= Decentralisation in Thailand =

Government reforms in Thailand since 1980s

Decentralisation in Thailand is a political decentralisation in Thailand since the 1990s, caused by the democratic movement. The Thai Constitution of 1997 and the Decentralisation Law of 1999 started an official reform process, but from 2001 to 2010, both the Thaksin governments and the military junta tried to re-centralization the bureaucratic system under the CEO-style management and military sanctions. In the 2014 coup, a reform process had been frozen from the military-dominated politics.

== History ==
Around the 5th to 15th century before the centralization period, Siam was the state of Mandala, a model for describing the patterns of diffuse political power distributed among Mueang or Kedatuan (principalities) in the early Southeast Asian history. One factor was the tributary state system, a protection from invasion by other powers.

=== Centralization ===
In the 1880s, freed from the Front Palace and Chinese rebellions, King Rama V initiated modernization and centralization reforms. He established the Royal Military Academy in 1887 to train officers in Western fashion. His upgraded forces provided the king much more power to centralize the country. Other reason is to survive the European colonisation of Southeast Asia since the 16th century, by boosting the power to govern the territory and population.

From 1893 to 1915, King Rama V created the Monthon Thesapiban system, second-level administrative units called monthons, to centralize the core inner areas first. It took five years to centralize inner provinces that stay close to Bangkok.

It also took nineteen years to centralize outer provinces, and twenty-one years for the tributary states. The Thesapiban system propagated central policies from Bangkok and to develop a bureaucratic system in the region. Investments substantially distributed to inner monthons first, causing uneven long-run development across provinces. That created uneven development between Bangkok and other provinces of Siam, even the Thesapiban system was disbanded by the 1930s. The monthon structure still had been influenced to public infrastructure until early twentieth century.

== Central government agents ==
=== Administrative area and chief executives ===
King Rama V divided provinces into 18 regions. There were subdivisions of the regions called Provinces (Thai: จังหวัด), Districts (Thai: อำเภอ), Subdistricts (Thai: ตำบล), and Villages (Thai: หมู่บ้าน). Chief executives of these areas are Provincial Governors (Thai: ผู้ว่าราชการจังหวัด), Chief District Officers (Thai: นายอำเภอ), Subdistrict Heads (Thai: กำนัน), and Village Heads (Thai: ผู้ใหญ่บ้าน) respectively.

=== Regional Administration ===
There were two groups of local agents, fully working under the Ministry of Interior (MoI), to assist the MoI and the government ministries' tasks. Firstly, the central government's Regional Administration (RA, Thai: ราชการส่วนภูมิภาค) that was controlled through bureaucratic Provincial Governors (PGs) and Chief District Officers (CDOs). This caused PGs unable to collect tax freely any further under a supervisor by the RA. Secondly, in 1897, the king also created the Sanitary Districts (SDs, sukhaphiban, Thai: สุขาภิบาล) as the first era of decentralization in Thailand, but it was repealed after the king death in 1910. It was the system which Subdistrict Heads (Thai: กำนัน), elected from Village Heads, and Village Heads, popularly elected within Villages. Both are serving as quasi-agents of the central government but they do not replace each other. The RA links together and produce overlap authority.

The Local Government Act of 1914 enacted to form the foundation of Thai modern local administration which is the form of deconcentration. Clientelism and hierarchy system incorporated highly in the centralized system such as the Sakdina system and the Bearers (Thai: นาย) and the Command Manpower (Thai: ไพร่). The Command Manpower were mostly farmers that cultivated resources for the central government through a command by the Bearers. This structure is still very conscious in modern Thai society, running counter to transparency government concept.

== Bureaucratic polity after 1932 ==
=== Provincial Councils and Municipalities ===
The Siamese revolution of 1932 created the Administrative Law of 1933 with the new three-tier structure, central government, provincial administrations, and local levels. Provincial Councils (Thai: สภาจังหวัด) were set up to do consultative tasks at the provincial level. Municipalities (Thai: เทศบาล) were also created, at the time, as local level area with delegation tasks and no autonomy with the status of juristic person. Municipalities were set up by popularly elected mayor and councils, but the scope was limited to just garbage disposal, water work, slaughterhouses, crematoria and cemeteries, markets, piers, and ferries only, with an insufficient budget for only these activities.

In 1935, after the end of King Rama VII reign, Thailand became bureaucratic polity (Thai: รัฐราชการ).

=== Phibun period ===
In 1952, Phibun recreated decentralisation in the form of Sanitary Districts (SDs), including Subdistricts and Villages that were abolished in the 1910s. SDs were governed by a council that led by the CDO. Under SDs were elected body of Sub Districts and Villages. Later, SDs were changed to Subdistrict Municipalities (SMs, Thai: เทศบาลตำบล) in 1999.

In 1955, Phibun promoted Provincial Councils to be the Provincial Administrative Organizations (PAOs; Thai: องค์การบริหารส่วนจังหวัด, อบจ.), adding the executive into Provincial Councils, in which councils were elected by province's population, but the PAO Chief Executives (PCEs; Thai: นายกองค์การบริหารส่วนจังหวัด, นายก อบจ.) were appointed by Provincial Governors.

In 1956, Phibun created the Subdistrict Administrative Organizations (SAOs; Thai: องค์การบริหารส่วนตำบล, อบต.) and the Subdistrict Councils (SCs; Thai: สภาตำบล).

=== Cold war period ===
In 1965, the big central government's bureaucrats increased to 250,000 from 75,000 in 1944.

In the 1970s, the Thai Parliament (TP) introduced Subdistrict funds with the decision comes from the TP members.

In 1975 and 1978, Sanya Dharmasakti and Kriangsak Chamanan established the Bangkok Metropolitan Administration and Pattaya City respectively as special local administrations.

In 1976, Kraisorn Tantiphong, member of Parliament from Chiang Mai proposed that Provincial Governors must be popularly elected but it was rejected by Seni Pramoj government as there was no support from the parliament, media or public society.

== Causes ==
Politics in Thailand before the 1991 coup was the situation of money politics and widespread corruption. It results in the first study of political reform in December 1991, the Study of the Thai Constitution Project of the Institute of Policy Studies, catching a lot of attention from public.

The Black May in 1992, massive protests were cracked down by armed militaries and polices. It ended in the victory of pro-democracy groups that led to adoption of decentralization, supporting by democracy movement. Policy to make local administrations stronger was incorporated in the 7th National Economic and Social Development Plan of 1991 to 1996 and the 8th National Plan of 1997 to 2001.

== Reform ==
Decentralization in Thailand was firstly promoted by neo liberal economists, policy practitioners of international development agencies, and non-governmental organizations. Liberal elites cited these problems as lack of accountability of politicians, but NGOs called to focus more on decentralisation. Decentralisation was not supported by the bureaucrats and the senior officers of the Ministry of Interior, claimed that it challenged the unitary state principle. They feared that it will develop into autonomous state then turn into republic, which will remove the revered Monarchy of Thailand.

=== 1994 SAO Law ===
Chuan government in 1992 rejected the proposal for election of Provincial Governor, even though he formed the Decentralization Committee (DC) in the same year. Nevertheless, it was considered as first time in the history of Thailand, aiming to increase efficiency and power of local administratives. NGOs criticized that two-thirds of DC's committees came from the Ministry of Interior.

The proposal to make Provincial Governor elective was blocked by the influential MoI bureaucrats, to deflect attention away from it, in 1994, the Subdistrict Council and Subdistrict Administrative Organisation Law (SAO Law) was enacted instead. SCs with a revenue more than 150,000 baht for three consecutive fiscal years would be upgraded to SAOs. Subdistricts, central government's agents, also gained more autonomy level. Subdistrict Heads and Village Heads were included in the new SAOs' system as a result of compromise process.

=== 1997 constitution ===
The 1997 constitution is the first constitution to promote decentralisation and local autonomy, reducing the power of the Ministry of Interior. Section 78 specified decentralisation as one of the most important state policies. Section 282 defines that central government must provide local administrative autonomy. Section 285 entrusted popularly elected local councils and executives, but in other way, local executives can be selected through local councils, until the end of 2003, executives must be popularly elected. It was to abolish the leader duty of Provincial Governors in PAOs and to prohibit both Subdistrict Heads and Village Heads to be elected in SAOs.

Elected structures were established in municipalities, SAOs, and PAOs that are backed by a financial transfer from the central government. In reality, these local elected structures, called Local Administrative Organizations (LAOs) (Thai: องค์การบริหารส่วนท้องถิ่น, อปท.) were not realized as local governments or having their own autonomy. Arghiros mentions that LAOs, especially PAOs, were more like colonies of the central government to ensure effective central power over rural areas.

PAOs' duties are formulating provincial development plans, supporting other administratives in the province, allocating grant, and cooperating with them. SAOs duties are enacting law and order, maintaining irrigation and transportation, managing waste and water, taking care of public health, and providing some welfare services. City Municipalities' duties are enacting law and order, planning irrigation and transportation, managing waste and water, taking care of public health, and providing some welfare services and firefighting.

==== PAO structure ====
The Provincial Administrative Organization Law enacted in 1997, amended in 1999, the PAOs is separated into legislative and executive branches, as PAO councils are directly elected for four-year terms. PAO councilors are limit to the local population, 24 members for less than 500,000 people, 30 members for between 1 million to 1.5 million people, 36 members between 1.5 million to 2 million people, and 42 members for more than 2 million people. Chief Executive of PAOs also elected.

==== SAO structure ====
The SAO councils are directly elected from Village, two members from each Village are required. There is minimum of three members, if it is two Villages, and minimum of six members, if it is one Village. The heads of the executive are also directly elected.

=== 1999 Decentralisation Plan and Procedure Act ===
==== National Decentralisation Committee (NDC) ====
The Decentralisation Plan and Procedure Act (DPPA) in 1999 established the National Decentralisation Committee (NDC) composed of at least 36 members, with the goal to transfer fiscal and personnel to LAOs. Chair of NDC was PM Chuan Leekpai. The members were politicians from three parties, 12 central government officials, 12 local administration officials, 12 academics and intellectuals.

==== NDC Sub-committees ====
There were four sub-committees. Firstly, Strategic Planning committee was to develop the Decentralization Action Plan (DAP), which finished in November 2001. The Decentralization Action Plan guilded for transferring tasks to local governments. Secondly, Finance and Personnel committee was to provide guidelines of taxes and local personnel subjects, according to the DAP. Thirdly, the Law and Legislation committee was to recommend the revision of laws and regulations to implement the devolution and delegation of tasks. Forthly, Monitoring and Evaluation committee was to assess the process of decentralisation by identifying problems.

==== Decentralization Action Plan ====
The Decentralization Action Plan in 2001 was to transfer six areas of services such as local utilities and infrastructures, social welfare, public security, local economic development, environmental management, and cultural organisation from the central government to LAOs. It supported a form of checks on executive power to curb politicians' corruption, but local governments would be monitored by the MoI to increase the rule of law and civil society more than to empower local autonomy. The National Education Act also helped gradual decentralization of the education structure.

The Action Plan of 2002 specified to transfer a total of 245 functions from 50 departments within 11 ministries to LAOs, separated into compulsory and non-compulsory categories.

==== Municipal structure ====
The new election of strong-mayor system is the product of the 1999 DPPA, as Municipal Councils cannot easily dismiss or veto Municipal Mayor, thus the MoI has the power to dissolve councils. There are three type of Municipality, City Municipalities (CMS), Town Municipalities (TMs), and Subdistrict Municipalities (SMs), local population of more than 50,000 people, 10,000 - 50,000 people, and under 10,000 people, and Municipal Council members are 24 members, 18 members, and 12 members respectively.

=== Local election ===
In 2013, local administrative executives are selected through direct elections, replacing the previous indirect and direct election choice.

== Institutional problems ==
=== Central government involvement ===
According to Thai Civilian Workforce data in the fiscal Year 2007, central government personnel accounted around 1 million personnel and local governments personnel accounted around 200,000 personnel. Central government personnel ratio of five to one personnel makes the degree of centralization high.

LAOs have an autonomy to govern but the MoI-appointed provincial governors or chief district officers could dismiss local administration assemblies and local councils. Provincial Governors (PGs) could give legal provision or suspend decisions by LAOs. The MoI could control municipal clerks and section chiefs. Both the MoI and its agents can disapprove budget plans and regulations. The MoI with the Electoral Commission dismissed 5.6 percent in 2007 and 1 percent in 2012, of all local executives, mainly from SAOs.

PAO councils are unable to control or monitor PGs, as provincial governors act as PAO Chief Executive. PAOs also have to rely on well-equipped provincial bureaucrats to carry on all local tasks.

Since the 2000s, LAOs lacked local competencies to carry out tasks. The MoI's PGs and Chief District Officers (CDOs) still retain official power over LAOs such as local elections, managing disputes among LAOs, coordinating activities of LAOs. Both PGs and CDOs can request a fiscal support from LAOs such as sporting events, festivals, in which they are compulsory.

LAOs have one personnel committee for their personnel management from the central government, LAOs council member, and scholars, in which they are mostly bureaucrats from central government. The committee secretaries also come from the MoI.

In 2002, the Decentralization Operational Plan required the Ministry of Education to review LAOs' education readiness before implement the plan, similar to the Ministry of Public Health.

== Recentralization 2001 - 2010 ==
Since Thaksin Shinawatra became the prime minister of Thailand in 2001, the Thai Rak Thai Party (TRT) also won big landslide victory in 2004. His party implemented policies attempting to recentralize. Mansrisuk mentioned that his One Million Fund for Village had acted without LAOs participation, such as PAOs or SAOs. TRT policies also swayed local voters with village-level support programmes. The CEO-styled Provincial Governors direction was also opposed to decentralization plan.

The 2006 Thai coup d'état repealed the 1997 constitution. The military junta drafted the new 2007 constitution which provided for referendum on main local issues and required for annual reports by LAOs on fiscal budget and annual expenditures. It causes the central government fewer process to dismiss elected officials. But Malesky and Hutchison noted that the 2006 Thai coup d'état accelerated decentralization process to curb central power of Thaksin.

The central government gained more power over SAO committees. Even though, the 2007 constitution increased PAOs power and called on SAOs to engage in development planning more. The Community Council Act of 2007 also enforced SAOs to engage. In 2008, the Pheu Thai Party (PTP) government, former TRT, amended the Provincial Administrative Act of 1914 to increase Village Heads tenure age to the age of 60. It was the return of practices before the 1997 constitution. This attracts SAO Councilors to return to their villages to apply for Village Head instead.

The PTP government changed Subdistrict Heads selection from Village Head elective to a direct appointment by Chief District Officers. The final amendment was to forbid the abolition of both sub-district heads and Village heads.

Unger and Mahakanjana noted that the recentralization in 2008-2009 occurs because of their relationship with national level politicians which they often rely on sub-district heads to serve political supporters. Both military and the PTP governments involved in this recentralization.

== 2014 Coup ==
Before the 2014 Thai coup d'état, the PM Thaksin Shinawatra initiated the CEO governor policy by guaranteed status of PAOs and their provincial development plans and budgets in the 2007 Thai constitutional, but it was repealed by the 2014 coup. The National Peace Keeping Council's interim constitution suspended local elections and some executives were replaced by appointed officials from Prayut Chan-o-cha's order.

== Financial system ==
=== Revenue ===
LAO revenues are composing of own collected revenue, centrally collected taxes for local government, and grants. After 1999, local government revenues grew from 0.1 trillion baht in 2001 to 0.4 trillion baht in 2009. In 2009, revenue from LAOs including local taxes was 20 percent of local government revenue.

==== Own collected revenue ====
LAOs own-collected taxes consist of land and building tax, land development tax, signboard tax, slaughter duties, swallow nest duties, tobacco tax, petroleum tax, and hotel tax. LAOs own-collected non-tax consists of fees and fines, revenue from property, revenue from infrastructure services, and miscellaneous. In 2004, LAO own collected revenues was around 10 percent of total local government revenues. In 2010, land and building tax accounts around one-ninth.

Land values are used in calculating the land development tax, which current market values must be revalued every 4 years. Signboard taxes depends on the size and character numbers. Slaughter tax depends by the kind and quantity of animals slaughtered.

==== Centrally collected taxes for local government ====
LAOs centrally collected taxes for local government consist of commerce tax, VAT and specific business tax, liquor tax, excise, vehicle tax, property registration duties, gambling tax, royalties for minerals, royalties for petroleum, and other. In 2004, LAOs centrally collected taxes for local government was around 50 percent of total local government revenues.

==== Grants ====
There are the General Grants (GGs), the Specific Grants (SGs), and miscellaneous within central government grants. In 2004, LAOs grants was around 40 percent of total local government revenues. GGs were calculated by 150 baht per capita in 2010.

For SGs, granting process depends on national-level politicians. Decisions come from discussions between central government officials in the Ministry of Finance's Division of Local Finance and the Bureau of the Budget (Thai: สำนักงบประมาณ). All SGs were allocated through Ministry of Interior, Ministry of Agriculture and Cooperatives, Ministry of Transport, Ministry of Public Health, Ministry of Education, Ministry of Industry, Ministry of Labour, Ministry of Science and Technology, state enterprises, and other central government agencies. The Regional Cities Development Program (RCDP) of World Bank also included in the SGs.

In fiscal year of 2007, ratio between the GGs and the SGs was 12 to 1, but in fiscal year of 2010, it decreases to 1.3 to 1. Local government executives reportedly were dissatisfied with large SGs, which limit their annual budget.

=== Loans ===
Loans can be processed in LAOs, generally used to buy land or to construct their offices or infrastructure, but it tends to be underused as the central government's MoI must approve all loan requests.

=== Budget ===
The central government limits LAOs budget on personnel to 40 percent of their annual fiscal budgets, excluding grants from central government. The law tried to curb politicians that promise jobs in local governments. Increasing owned-collect tax is difficult due to the ceiling on 40 percent personnel spending. LAO's revenues are only limit to local services that comply with central government approval. Consequently, local executives often object to be dissatisfied that they seem more like an agent of the central government.

== Consequents ==
By the end of the 1990s, only 10 percent of annual fiscal was by local administrations. The Decentralization Act of 1999 called for 20 percent of the annual fiscal to be transferred to the new LAOs by 2001, and later at 35 percent by 2006.

In 2010, the local share of central government budget was 25 percent, short by 10 percent from the target.

In 2016, comparing schools between the Ministry of Education and municipal in education sector, the result was not different, giving the poor performance of overall Thai schools.

The National Audit Office tends to stop short of decentralization process by strictly control over the process.

The Pollution Control Department unable to shift tasks to LAOs because they lack of equipment or inspectors. SAOs are required by the law to have a fire truck but they have no budget to hire firefighters.

"Waste wars" happened by high-density municipalities dump their waste in around low-density SAOs.

Political competition for executive in LAOs is may be limited, between 2012 and 2014, 23 percent of elected executives were unopposed.

== Criticisms ==
Since the 1980s, the elected local councils were mostly a local contractor. In the study from 1997, a local contractor is representing 80 to 90 percent of local council seats, some dubbed as 'contractor councils' (Sapha Phulubmao). These opportunities increased an attractiveness from local politicians and national politicians. Candidates in local elections increased rapidly, they received financial support from both parties in a form of vote buying.

In 2007, Viengrat Nethipo found that mayor position of PAOs, municipals, and SAOs may be required to spend 100 million, 50 million, and half million baht, contrary to a seat in the national parliament that may be required around 30 million.

Nagai, Funatsu and Kagoya comment in 2008 that smaller LAOs refuse to bare the responsibilities with high-cost maintenance work, and that they tend to invest on new infrastructure. Some mandatory services are also beyond LAOs' capability.

Unger and Mahakanjana suspect in 2016 that the main problems are insufficient resources and central government interference, causing the weaknesses of LAOs. Deeply-rooted centralism, patronage society, and weak civil society also stop decentralization process to grow. They also concluded that the 1997 reform was the culmination of a rather thin political process. Other point is the excessive regulation by central government that required Municipal officers to submit excessive qualifications to be promoted to level of secretary general.

== See also ==
- Decentralisation in Japan
