= List of governors of Surat Thani =

Governor of the Surat Thani province
- ผู้ว่าราชการจังหวัดสุราษฎร์ธานี
- Seal of the Surat Thani province
- Incumbent; Jumpoj Wannachatrasiri since 12 November 2025
- Style: Mr. Governor (informal); The Honourable (formal); His Excellency (diplomatic)
- Reports to: Ministry of Interior
- Residence: Surat Thani Governor's Residence
- Seat: Surat Thani City Hall
- Nominator: Minister of Interior
- Appointer: King of Thailand (by royal command)
- Term length: Four years, or Retirement (as approved by the cabinet)
- Formation: 1907; 119 years ago
- First holder: Phraya Wora Rit Rua Cha
- Deputy: Deputy Governor of Surat Thani
- Salary: ฿105,800 per month ($3,167 USD)
- Website: www.suratthani.go.th

List of the provincial governors (ผู้ว่าราชการจังหวัด) of Surat Thani Province, Thailand.

| Nr. | Name | Thai | Years in office |
|---|---|---|---|
| 1 | Phraya Wora Rit Rua Chai | พระยาวรฤทธิ์ฤๅไชย | 1907-15 |
| 2 | Phraya Chumphon Buri Si Samut Khet | พระยาชุมพรบุรีศรีสมุทเขต | 1915-16 |
| 3 | Phraya Phisan Sa Raket | พระยาพิศาลสารเกษตร์ | 1916-18 |
| 4 | Phraya Wichit Phakdi Si Surat Thanin | พระยาวิชิตภักดีศรีสุราษฎร์ธานินทร์ | 1918-20 |
| 5 | Phraya Si Maha Kaset | พระยาศรีมหาเกษตร | 1920-26 |
| 6 | Phraya Surat Thani | พระยาสุราษฎร์ธานี | 1926-34 |
| 7 | Phra Boribunwutthirat | พระบริบูรณ์วุฒิราษฎร์ | 1934-38 |
| 8 | Luang Srisotsaralak | หลวงสฤษฏสาราลักษ์ | 1938-41 |
| 9 | Luang Atkanlayanawinit | หลวงอรรถกัลยาณวินิจ | 1942 |
| 10 | Chalo Charuchinda | ชลอ จารุจินดา | 1942-43 |
| 11 | Luang Kasemprasat | หลวงเกษมประศาสน์ | 1943-44 |
| 12 | Khun Samratsaratborirak | ขุนสำราษราษฎร์บริรักษ์ | 1944 |
| 13 | Maen On-Chan | แม้น อรจันทร์ | 1944-46 |
| 14 | Khun Ratwutthiwichan | ขุนรัฐวุฒิวิจารณ์ | 1946-49 |
| 15 | Luean Khaisaeng | เลื่อน ไขแสง | 1949-53 |
| 16 | Khun Aksanasansit | ขุนอักษณสารสิทธิ์ | 1953-54 |
| 17 | Chan Sombunkun | จันทร์ สมบูรณ์กุล | 1954-58 |
| 18 | Chalong Ramitanon | ฉลอง รมิตานนท์ | 1958-60 |
| 19 | Praphan Na Phatthalung | ประพันธ์ ณ พัทลุง | 1960-66 |
| 20 | Phon Bunyaprasop | พร บุญยะประสพ | 1966-68 |
| 21 | Khlai Chitphithak | คล้าย จิตพิทักษ์ | 1968-72 |
| 22 | Arun Nathadecha | อรุณ นาถะเดชะ | 1972-74 |
| 23 | Anan Sa-nguannam | อนันต์ สงวนนาม | 1974-76 |
| 24 | Chalit Pimolsiri | ชลิต พิมลศิริ | 1976-78 |
| 25 | Kat Rakmani | กาจ รักษ์มณี | 1978-79 |
| 26 | Sanong Rotphothong | สนอง รอดโพธิ์ทอง | 1979-81 |
| 27 | Sawai Sirimongkhon | ไสว ศิริมงคล | 1981-83 |
| 28 | Niphon Bunyaphatro | นิพนธ์ บุญญภัทโร | 1983-87 |
| 29 | Wirot Ratrak | วิโรจน์ ราชรักษ์ | 1987-89 |
| 30 | Damri Watsingha | ดำริ วัฒนสิงหะ (th) | 1989-90 |
| 31 | Anu Sa-Nguannam | อนุ สงวนนาม | 1990-92 |
| 32 | Praphat Bamphensit | ประพัฒน์พงษ์ บำเพ็ญสิทธิ์ | 1992-94 |
| 33 | Prayun Phrommaphan | ประยูร พรหมพันธุ์ | 1994-95 |
| 34 | Pricha Rakkhit | ปรีชา รักษ์คิด | 1996-97 |
| 35 | Niwet Somsakun | นิเวศน์ สมสกุล | 1997-98 |
| 36 | Phuchong Rungrot | ภุชงค์ รุ่งโรจน์ (th) | 1998-2000 |
| 37 | Chanchai Sunthonmat | ชาญชัย สุนทรมัฏฐ์ | 2000-01 |
| 38 | Yongyut Takophon | ยงยุทธ ตะโกพร | 2001-02 |
| 39 | Mom Luang Prathip Charunrot | หม่อมหลวงประทีป จรูญโรจน์ | 2002-03 |
| 40 | Thira Rotchanaphonphan | ธีระ โรจนพรพันธุ์ | 2003-04 |
| 41 | Wichit Wichaisan | วิจิตร วิชัยสาร | 2004-06 |
| 42 | Niwat Sawatkaeo | นิวัตน์ สวัสดิ์แก้ว | 2006-07 |
| 43 | Winai Buapradit | วินัย บัวประดิษฐ์ | 2007-08 |
| 44 | Pracha Terat | ประชา เตรัตน์ | 2008-09 |
| 45 | Damri Bunching | ดำริห์ บุญจริง | 2009-10 |
| 46 | Thirayuth Iamtrakul | ธีระยุทธ เอี่ยมตระกูล | 2010-12 |
| 47 | Cherdsak Chusri | เชิดศักดิ์ ชูศรี | 2012 |
| 48 | Chatpong Chatphut | ฉัตรป้อง ฉัตรภูติ | 2012-15 |
| 49 | Wongsiri Phromchana | วงศศิริ พรหมชนะ | 2015-16 |
| 50 | Auaychai Innak | อวยชัย อินทร์นาค | 2016-17 |
| 51 | Witchawut Jinto | วิชวุทย์ จินโต | 2017-23 |
| 52 | Jessada Chitrat | เจษฎา จิตรัตน์ | 2023-24 |
| 53 | Theerut Supawiboonphol | ธีรุตม์ ศุภวิบูลย์ผล | 2024- |

Comment: Till 1941 the Thai year began on April 1, thus some of the years in the table above may be off by one
