= Muban =

Administrative village in Thailand

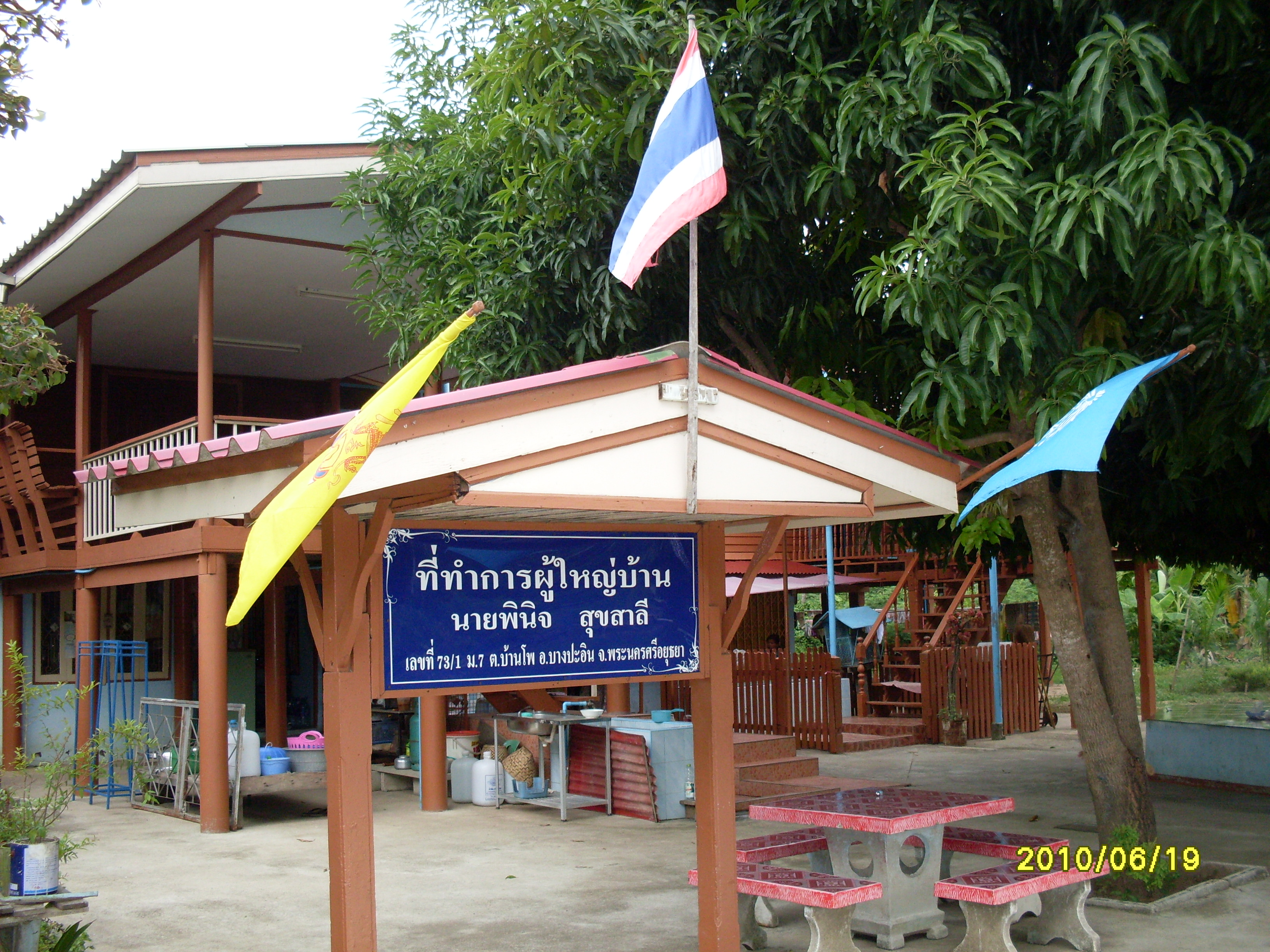
A village chief (phu yai ban) office in tambon Ban Po, Bang Pa-in District, Ayutthaya Province

Muban (Thai: หมู่บ้าน; RTGS: mu ban, pronounced [mùː bâːn]) is the lowest administrative sub-division of Thailand. Usually translated as 'village' and sometimes as 'hamlet', they are a subdivision of a tambon (subdistrict). As of 2008, there were 74,944 administrative mubans in Thailand. As of the 1990 census, the average village consisted of 144 households or 746 persons. The average land area of villages in Thailand is very small, its average area is about 6.84 km^{2} (2.64 sq mi), and its average population is also very small, at only 932 people.

== Nomenclature ==
Muban may function as one word, in the sense of a hamlet or village, and as such, it may be shortened to ban. Mu ban may also function as two words, i.e., หมู่ 'group' (of) บ้าน 'homes'.

- Mu, in the sense of group (of homes in a tambon), are assigned numbers in the sequence in which each is entered in a register maintained in the district or branch-district office.
- Ban, in the sense of home or household for members of each group, is assigned a number (Thai: บ้านเลขที่; RTGS: ban lek thi) in the sequence in which each is added to the household register also maintained in the district or branch-district office. Each ban is registered in the name of a householder (Thai: เจ้าบ้าน; RTGS: chao ban). Assigned ban and mu numbers, together with the names of tambon, district, and province, are used as geographic addresses by government agencies; Thailand Post adds a postal code. Village or ban names do not usually form part of such official addresses.
- Ban in the sense of Village occurs in geopolitical toponyms on maps and Thai highway network signage, but these are not administrative subdivisions. Such village names may apply to an isolated muban, but typically apply to a group of adjoining ones, which have often been subdivided from the original settlement. Each new mu is assigned a new number, in the sequence in which it is registered; existing homes or ban in newly numbered mu are assigned new numbers starting with one. The village name of the original settlement is usually retained for the larger grouping.

Such village names are not part of a household address, unless Ban is retained as part of the toponym when such a settlement is upgraded—e.g., a household in Ban Dan would be addressed as Ban No.__ Mu No.__, Ban Dan Sub-district, Ban Dan District, Buriram; or #/# T[ambon] Ban Dan, A[mphoe] Ban Dan, Buriram 31000.

Note: Usage of the short form number/number for ban/mu is both unofficial and unambiguous in a tambon, but in city districts it is restricted to the subdivision of an original household registration into additional household registrations.

== Administration ==
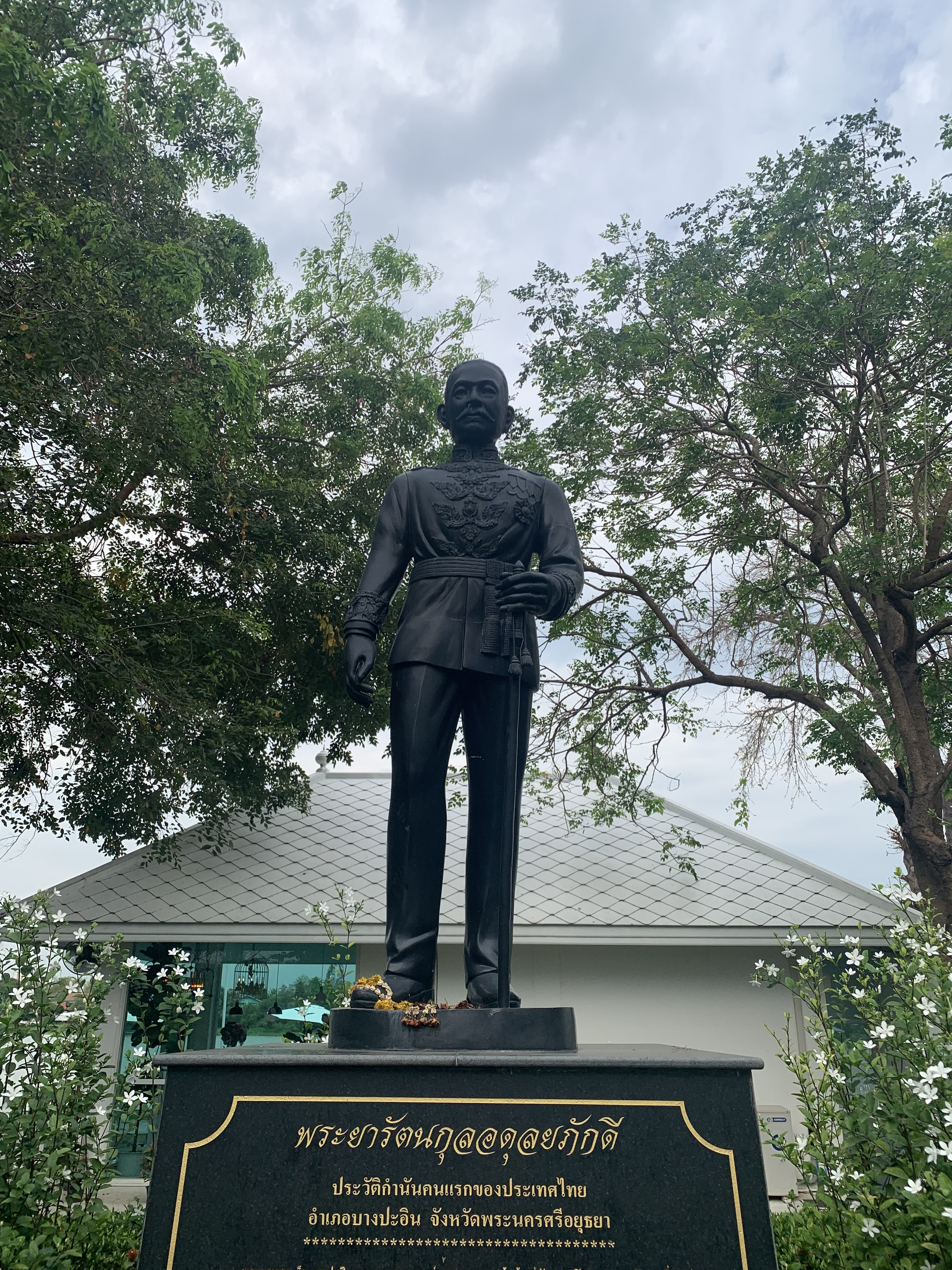
Statue of Phraya Rattanakun Adunlaya Phakdi, who in 1892 was elected as a phu yai ban in Bang Pa-in, making him the first phu yai ban. He later became, in 1894, the first kamnan of Thailand as well.

Each such mu or group is led by a headman, usually called a village headman or village chief (Thai: ผู้ใหญ่บ้าน; RTGS: phu yai ban), who is elected by the population of the village and then appointed by the Ministry of the Interior. The headman has two assistants, one for governmental affairs and one for security affairs. There also may be a village committee with elected members from the village, serving as an advisory body for a village. Originally the village headman, once elected, was in office until reaching retirement age. They now only serve for a five-year term but can then apply for reelection. The same is true for the office of kamnan (กำนัน) or 'sub-district headman' at the next higher tambon (sub-district) level.

Communities (ชุมชน) or neighborhoods that are part of a town or city (thesaban mueang and thesaban nakhon) have no equivalent to village headmen, but may be organized into community associations having advisory committees.

== Other meanings ==
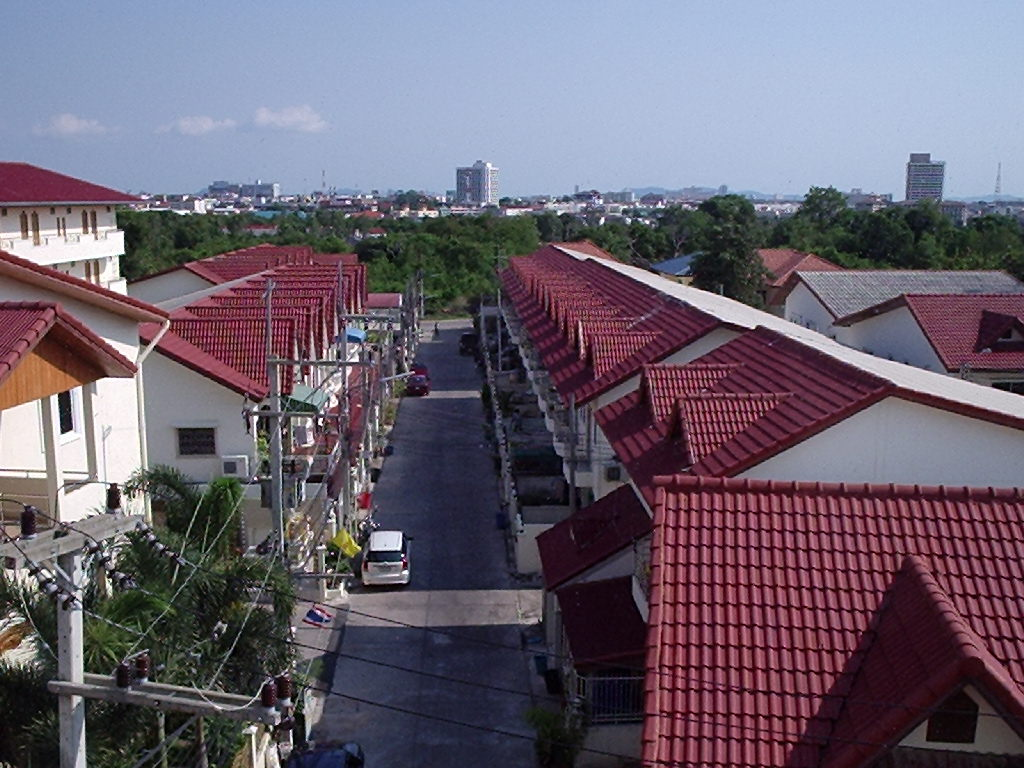
A gated community (muban chat san) in Pattaya, Chonburi Province

Muban (or more fully muban chat san, หมู่บ้านจัดสรร), is also the Thai term for 'housing estate' or 'gated community'.
