= Theerut Supawiboonphol =

Thai politician

- ธีรุตม์ ศุภวิบูลย์ผล

Governor of Surat Thani Province
- Incumbent
- Assumed office 1 October 2024
- Preceded by: Jessada Jitrat

Theerut Supawiboonphol (Thai: ธีรุตม์ ศุภวิบูลย์ผล) is a Thai civil servant, serving as Governor of Surat Thani Province from 2024. He previously served as Deputy Governor of Surat Thani Province, Deputy Governor of Yala Province, and Chief of the Yala Provincial Office.
