= Jessada Jitrat =

Thai politician & governor

- เจษฎา จิตรัตน์

Governor of Surat Thani Province
- In office October 1, 2023 – 2024
- Succeeded by: Theerut Supawiboonphol

Governor of Songkhla Province
- In office 2022–2023

Governor of Narathiwat Province
- In office 9 October 2020 – 2022

Jessada Jitrat (Thai: เจษฎา จิตรัตน์, RTGS: Chetsada Chitrat) is a Thai civil servant, who served as Governor of Surat Thani Province from 2023 to 2024.

== Career ==
Jessada previously served as Governor of Narathiwat Province and Songkhla Province.

Jessada has overseen the crackdown on foreign land purchases, particularly on Ko Samui. In May 2024, the Ko Samui Land Issue Task Force began to review documents related to land misuse on the island.
