= Kamnan =

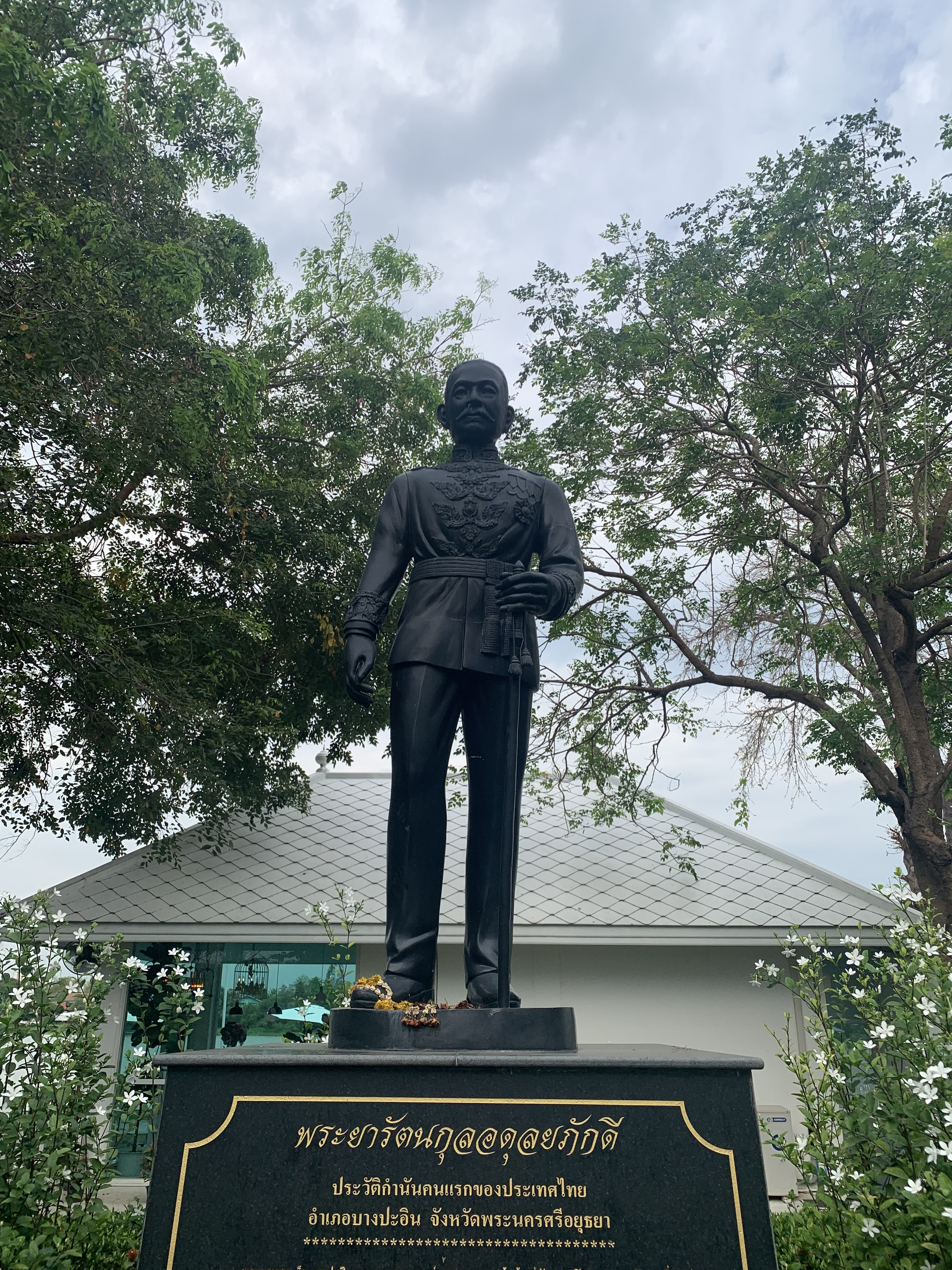
Statue of Phraya Rattanakun Adunlaya Phakdi, who in 1894 was elected the kamnan of tambon Ban Len in Bang Pa-in, making him the first kamnan.

A kamnan (Thai: กำนัน) is a Thai governing official at the tambon (subdistrict) level. Its official English translation is "subdistrict headman".

The position of a kamnan was introduced with the Thesaphiban administrative reforms near the end of the 19th century, first enacted in 1892. The kamnan would be chosen from among the village elders (phu yai ban) of the villages that make up the tambon. Originally, it was a lifetime post, but now is for a fixed term. The kamnan's main task was to implement the policies of the higher administrative levels, and he was the main point of government contact for the people of the tambon.

With the Tambon Council and Tambon Administrative Authority Act BE 2537 (1994), the tambon assumed a role in local policy making. Under the 1997 constitution, Tambon Administrative Organizations (TAO) were created as new local administrative units. The lifetime appointment also was replaced by a five-year term of office.

== See also ==
- Somchai Khunpluem, a politician and kamnan; known as "Kamnan Poh"
