= Thailand =

Country in Southeast Asia

Kingdom of Thailand: ราชอาณาจักรไทย; Ratcha-anachak Thai
- Flag Emblem
- Anthem: เพลงชาติไทย; Phleng Chat Thai "Thai National Anthem" Royal anthem: สรรเสริญพระบารมี Sansoen Phra Barami "Praise the King"
- Location of Thailand (green) in Southeast Asia
- Capital and largest city: Bangkok (Note: Officially known in Thai as Krung Thep Maha Nakhon); 13°48′N 100°33′E
- Official languages: Thai
- Other languages: Isan; Northern Thai; Southern Thai; Karen; Pattani Malay; Bangkok Malay; Teochew; Hokkien
- Ethnic groups: 80% Thai; 37% Central Thai; 25% Isan; 8% Northern Thai; 8% Southern Thai; 2% Western Thai; 12% Thai Chinese; 4% Northern Khmer; 4% Thai Malay
- Religion (2018 census): 93.46% Buddhism; 5.37% Islam; 1.13% Christianity; 0.03% other
- Demonym: Thai
- Government: Unitary parliamentary constitutional monarchy
  - Monarch: Vajiralongkorn (Rama X)
  - Prime Minister: Anutin Charnvirakul
- Legislature: National Assembly
  - Upper house: Senate
  - Lower house: House of Representatives

Formation
  - Sukhothai Kingdom: 1238–1438
  - Ayutthaya Kingdom: 1351–1767
  - Thonburi Kingdom: 1767–1782
  - Rattanakosin Kingdom: 6 April 1782
  - Constitutional monarchy: 24 June 1932
  - Current constitution: 6 April 2017

Area
  - Total: 513,120 km^{2} (198,120 sq mi) (50th)
  - Water (%): 0.4 (2,230 km^{2})

Population
  - 2024 estimate: ▲65,975,198 (22nd)
  - 2010 census: 64,785,909 (21st)
  - Density: 132.1/km^{2} (342.1/sq mi) (88th)
- GDP (PPP): 2026 estimate
  - Total: ▲$1.984 trillion (24th)
  - Per capita: ▲$27,724 (75th)
- GDP (nominal): 2026 estimate
  - Total: ▲$599.115 billion (31st)
  - Per capita: ▲$8,372 (97th)
- Gini (2023): ▼33.5 medium inequality
- HDI (2023): ▼0.798 high (76th)
- Currency: Thai baht (฿) (THB)
- Time zone: UTC+7 (ICT)
- Date format: dd/mm/yyyy (BE)
- Calling code: +66
- ISO 3166 code: TH
- Internet TLD: .th; .ไทย

Thailand, (Note: /ˈtaɪlænd, -lənd/ TY-land, -lənd; Thai: ประเทศไทย, RTGS: Prathet Thai, pronounced [prà.tʰê:t tʰāj]) officially the Kingdom of Thailand, (Note: Thai: ราชอาณาจักรไทย; Ratcha-anachak Thai pronounced [râːt.tɕá.ʔāː.nāː.t͡ɕàk tʰāj]) and formerly known as Siam, (Note: /saɪˈæm, ˈsaɪæm/ sy-AM, SY-am; Thai: สยาม, RTGS: Sayam, pronounced [sà.jǎːm]; also spelled Siem, Syâm, or Syâma) is a country located in Mainland Southeast Asia. It shares land borders with Myanmar to the west and northwest, Laos to the east and northeast, Cambodia to the southeast, and Malaysia to the south. Its maritime boundaries include the Gulf of Thailand and the Andaman Sea, and it shares maritime borders with Vietnam, Indonesia, and India. Thailand has a population of nearly 66 million people and covers an area of approximately 513,115 km^{2} (198,115 sq mi). The capital and largest city is Bangkok.

Archaeological evidence indicates that humans have inhabited the area for at least 40,000 years. Indigenous ethnic groups include the Mon, Khmer, and Malay people. The Tai people are believed to have originated from the Điện Biên Phủ region since the 5th century and began migrating into the territory of modern Thailand between the 8th and 10th centuries. During the classical historical period, major kingdoms such as Sukhothai, Lan Na, and Ayutthaya were established. The Sukhothai Kingdom is regarded as the beginning of Thai history, while the Ayutthaya Kingdom, founded in 1350 CE, became a regional power replacing the Khmer Empire. European contact began in 1511 when Portuguese envoys arrived in Ayutthaya. The Ayutthaya Kingdom flourished until its complete destruction during the 1765–1767 Burmese–Siamese War by the Burmese forces under the Konbaung dynasty in 1767.

After the fall of Ayutthaya, King Taksin reunified the kingdom and established the Thonburi Kingdom, which lasted only 15 years before he was overthrown by Phutthayotfa Chulalok (Rama I), the founder of the Chakri dynasty. King Rama I established the Rattanakosin Kingdom and moved the capital to Bangkok in 1782. During the era of Western imperialism, Siam remained the only country in Southeast Asia to avoid colonisation by European powers, although it ceded territory, trade rights, and legal privileges through several unequal treaties. The governance system evolved into an absolute monarchy centralised under the rule of King Chulalongkorn (Rama V). Siam adapted to international relations during the imperialist era and joined World War I on the side of the Allies, a political decision aimed at revising the effects of unequal treaties and enhancing Siam's international status.

Following the Siamese revolution of 1932 by the Khana Ratsadon (lit. 'People's Party'), Siam transitioned to a parliamentary constitutional monarchy and was officially renamed Thailand. During World War II, the country was under the military dictatorship of Plaek Phibunsongkhram and allied with the Empire of Japan as part of the Axis powers, but Thailand did not become a defeated nation due to the underground Free Thai Movement's "Declaration of Peace", which was recognised by the Allies. During the Cold War, Thailand became a key major non-NATO ally of the United States and played a major role in countering communism in the Korean War, the Vietnam War, and other proxy wars. Thailand also joined the Southeast Asia Treaty Organization (SEATO). In the 1970s through 1990s, Thailand alternated between liberal democracy and military dictatorship.

In the 21st century, Thailand has experienced political conflict between supporters and opponents of Prime Minister Thaksin Shinawatra, leading to the 2006 and 2014 coups d'état. Thailand operates under the 2017 Constitution and a coalition government following the 2019 Thai general election, as well as political demonstrations demanding democracy and monarchy reform. The current constitutional structure allows de facto political influence by the Royal Thai Armed Forces. Thailand has faced border tensions from the 2008–2011 Cambodian–Thai border crisis extending to the 2025 Cambodian–Thai border crisis involving territorial disputes and military clashes.

Thailand is recognised as a developing country and holds significant geopolitical importance as a regional power in Southeast Asia. A unitary state governed under a parliamentary system, Thailand promotes its shared values and interests through participation in international organisations including the United Nations and the Association of Southeast Asian Nations (ASEAN), and as a major non-NATO ally of the United States. As a newly industrialised country, its economy ranks among the largest in the region, relying chiefly upon manufacturing, agriculture, and tourism.

== Etymology ==
Before 1939, Thailand was known internationally as Siam. The word Thai (ไทย) is traditionally interpreted to mean 'free man' in the Thai language, distinguishing the Thai from serfs in historical society. However, other scholars suggest the term originally meant simply 'people' or 'human being', noting its historical use in rural areas.

Thais typically refer to their country using the polite form prathet Thai (Thai: ประเทศไทย) or the more colloquial mueang Thai (Thai: เมืองไทย). The word mueang, which archaically referred to a city-state, is commonly used to denote a city or region. The country's official name, Ratcha-anachak Thai (Thai: ราชอาณาจักรไทย), translates to 'Kingdom of Thailand'. Etymologically, its components derive from Sanskrit and Pali: ratcha ('royal'), ana ('authority'), and -chak ('wheel', a symbol of power).

The former name Siam may have originated from the Sanskrit word śyāma (श्याम, 'dark') or the Mon word rhmañña ('stranger'), which likely shares a root with Shan and Assam. Another theory suggests the name derives from the Chinese term Xiān, used to refer to the region. Following the merger of local kingdoms in 1349, Chinese records began referring to the Ayutthaya Kingdom as Xiānluó (暹羅). (Note: "Ayutthaya emerged as a dominant centre in the late 14th century. The Chinese called this region Xian, which the Portuguese converted into Siam.") The ancient Khmers also used Siam to refer to the people settled in the Chao Phraya River valley, as recorded in 13th-century inscriptions.

SPPM Mongkut Rex Siamensium, King Mongkut's signature

The name Siam gained official status in international relations during the 19th century, notably appearing in the Bowring Treaty under the signature of King Mongkut (r. 1851–1868), who signed as Mongkut Rex Siamensium (Mongkut, King of the Siamese). Following the transition to a constitutional monarchy, the country was officially renamed Thailand on 24 June 1939.

== History ==
=== Prehistory and origins ===
Continuous human habitation in present-day Thailand dates back at least 20,000 years. Agriculture emerged with rice cultivation around 2000 BCE, alongside participation in the Maritime Jade Road, a trading network connecting Southeast Asia from 2000 BCE to 1000 CE. The Ban Chiang site in northeast Thailand is the earliest known centre of copper and bronze production in Southeast Asia, dating between 2000 and 1000 BCE. Iron working appeared around 500 BCE.

The Indochinese Peninsula was heavily influenced by the culture and religions of India from the time of Funan, established in the 2nd century BCE. By the 6th century, early multiethnic kingdoms emerged, including the Mon principalities of Dvaravati and Hariphunchai. In the 9th century, the Khmer people established the Khmer Empire, centred in Angkor, while Tambralinga, a Malay state, rose to control trade through the Strait of Malacca in the 10th century.

The Thai people belong to the Tai ethnolinguistic group. While their exact origins are debated, historians suggest their ancestors migrated from southern China and northern Vietnam into present-day Thailand between the 6th and 11th centuries. Migrating into territory occupied by Mon and Khmer populations, the Tai intermixed with local groups and absorbed Indian, Mon, and Khmer cultural influences. Modern studies indicate that "Thai" serves more as a cultural designation resulting from this integration rather than a distinct genetic ethnicity. (Note: See § Ethnic groups.)

The term Syam first appears in the 11th and 12th centuries in Champa epigraphy and the bas-reliefs of Angkor Wat, which depict warriors and prisoners of war. Pre-14th-century Mainland Southeast Asian sources primarily used Syam as an ethnonym for a cultural group distinct from the Khmer, Cham, Mon, or Bagan. Chinese sources used Xian as a toponym for the region.

=== Early Tai confederate cities (673 BCE – 13th century CE) ===
Map showing geographic distribution of Kra–Dai linguistic family. Arrows represent general pattern of the migration of Tai-speaking tribes along the rivers and over the lower passes.

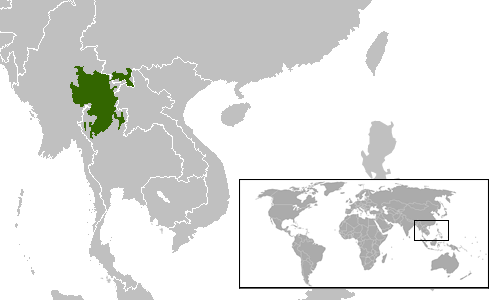
Lan Na kingdom during the reign of Tilokaraj (r. 1441–1487)

Ancestors of the Tai-speaking peoples are believed to have originated in the Yangtze basin as early as the 12th century BCE. Following conflicts with Chinese expansion in Guangxi, Tai groups gradually migrated southwestwards along rivers and mountain passes into Southeast Asia. By the first millennium CE, they had established early city-states across present-day northern Thailand, Laos, and northeastern Myanmar, becoming a dominant regional power.

According to northern chronicles, early Tai confederacies like Singhanavati and its successor Ngoenyang were established in northern Thailand during the first millennium CE. In 1262, King Mangrai relocated the Ngoenyang capital to Chiang Mai, founding the Lan Na kingdom. Mangrai unified surrounding principalities and expanded southwards, annexing the Mon kingdom of Hariphunchai in 1292.

Further south, Tai migrants interacted with indigenous Khmer and Mon populations through conflict and royal intermarriage. By the 12th century, Tai leaders controlled cities in the upper Chao Phraya basin. Their gradual displacement of Khmer and Mon influence culminated in the establishment of the Sukhothai Kingdom in 1238, marking a major shift in the region's political landscape.

=== Dvaravati (7th–11th centuries) ===
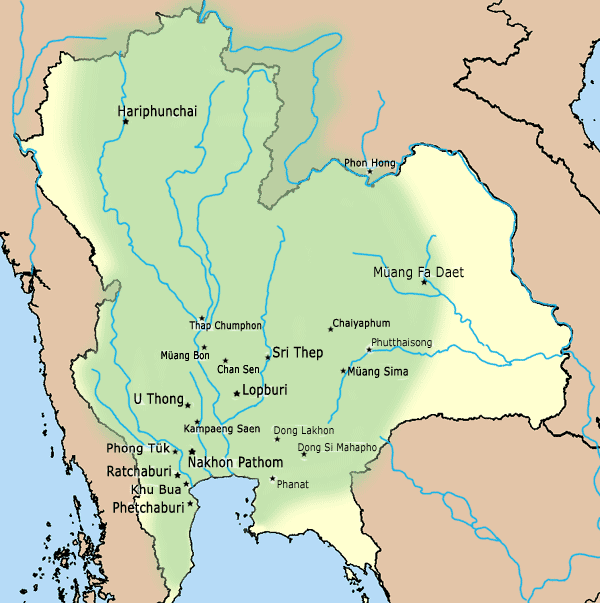
Map of settlements of Dvaravati culture from the 6th to 9th centuries

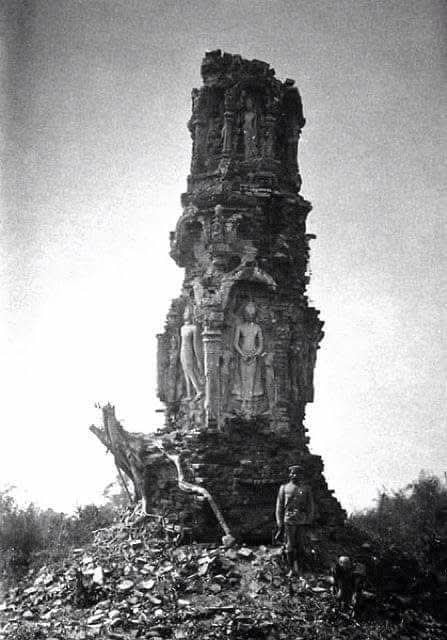
Dvaravati-style Chedi at Wat Phra Rub, Suphan Buri province, now completely destroyed.

The Chao Phraya River was home to the Mon Dvaravati culture, which flourished from the 7th to the 11th century. Samuel Beal identified the polity in Chinese records as "Duoluobodi". Early 20th-century excavations established Nakhon Pathom Province and U Thong as major centres. Dvaravati inscriptions used Sanskrit and Mon written in scripts derived from the Pallava alphabet.

Dvaravati is associated with Theravada Buddhism, likely transmitted from Sri Lanka, while its ruling class participated in Hindu rites. Dvaravati art shows strong Indian influence, whereas the eastern Chao Phraya valley displays greater Khmer and Hindu influence. Dvaravati culture spread into Isan and southwards to the Kra Isthmus. It operated as a network of city-states linked through the mandala political model. Baker and Pasuk challenge the idea that the plain was incorporated into a unified Lavo-Khmer polity, citing the absence of Angkorian temple-endowment inscriptions.

The name Dvaravati derives from medallions bearing the Sanskrit phrase śrīdvāravatīśvarapuṇya found at Nakhon Pathom and other sites. Chinese and Annamese records mention To-lo-po-ti, with tribute missions reaching the Tang court in 638, 640 and 649.

Art historians later extended the term Dvaravati to describe a wider body of styles and their corresponding period. Baker and Pasuk argue these styles spread through trade rather than political authority. Between the 6th and 12th centuries, forty moated towns shared religious practices, artistic traditions and Mon inscriptions but showed little political integration.

Recent research places the coastline near its present position by about 500 CE, challenging older views of a submerged lower gulf. The religious landscape was also diverse; images of Avalokiteśvara and Prajñāpāramitā appeared alongside Buddha images, reflecting mixed Buddhist practices rather than strict divisions.

==== Lavo ====
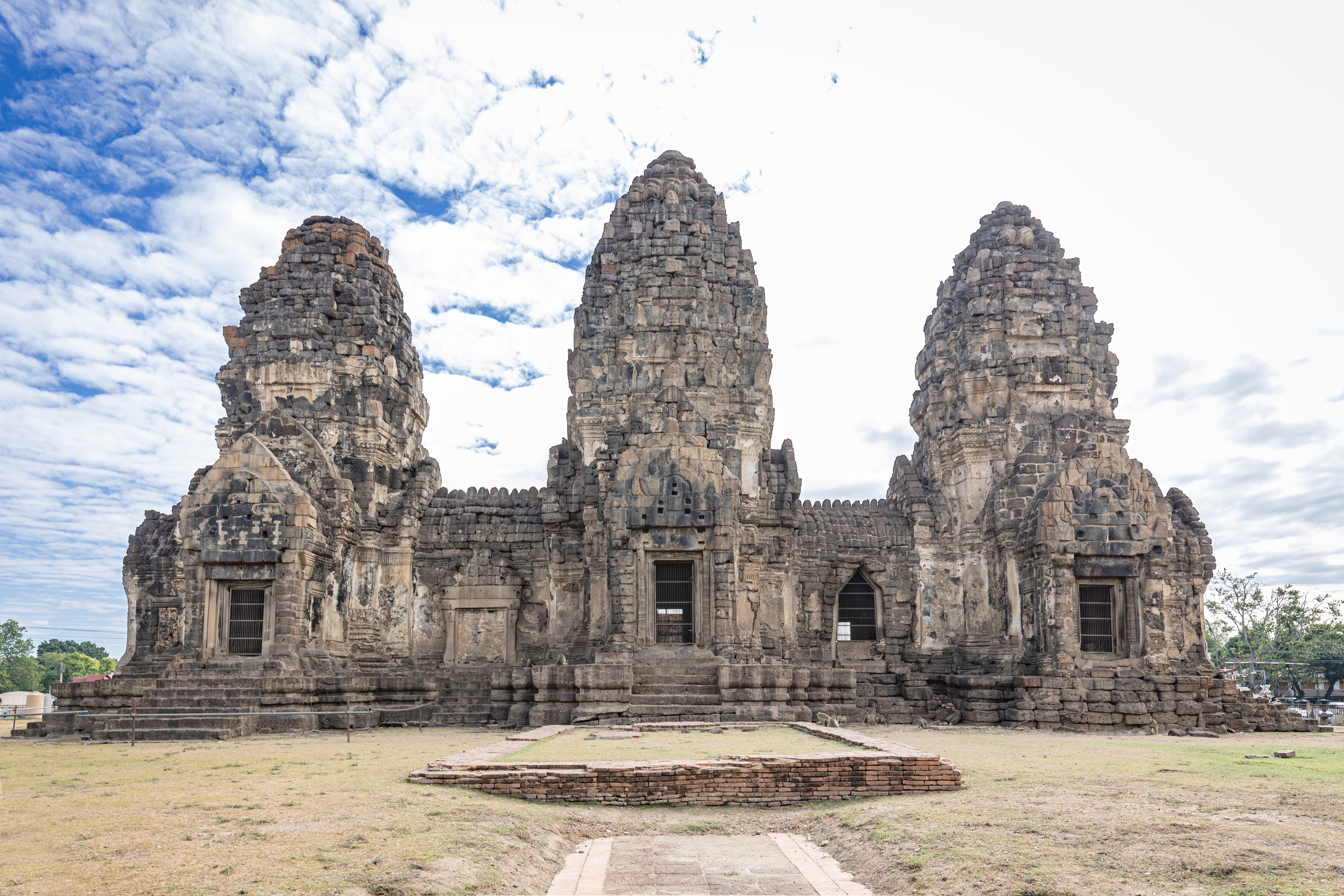
Wat Phra Prang Sam Yod, a 13th-century Angkorian temple in Lopburi.

Lavo belonged to the Dvaravati sphere early in the period. Chronicle traditions claim Lavapura was founded in 648—or possibly 538—by Kalavarnadisharaja. The only attested native language is Old Mon. Baker and Pasuk identify Lopburi as Lavapura.

Around the 10th century, central plain city-states reorganised into two mandalas: Lavo in the east and Suvarnabhumi (modern Suphan Buri) in the west. According to Northern Chronicles, a king of Tambralinga installed a Malay prince in Lavo in 903 or 927. This prince married a Khmer princess, and their son became Suryavarman I, linking Lavo to Khmer domination. However, Baker and Pasuk argue Angkorian control of Lavo was asserted rather than demonstrated, and the relationship remained flexible.

Angkor lost Lavo to Suphannabhum princes in 1052, moving the seat to Ayodhya under Narai I. Angkor pushed to recover influence in 1181 when Jayavarman VII appointed a kinsman to govern Lavapura. This pressured Lavo ruler Sri Dharmasokaraja II to flee to Nakhon Si Thammarat. Lavapura was likely recovered in the 13th century by a Tai prince. Angkorian power eventually waned, and in 1238, Bang Klang Hao took Sukhothai from Khom Sabat Khlon Lamphong, conventionally marking the kingdom's foundation.

==== Siam people ====
Early references to the Siam people occur in pre-Angkorian inscriptions. A 661 inscription from Angkor Borei mentions a female slave named Ku Sayam, while a 682 inscription records a noble named Sayam. Tatsuo Hoshino identifies several polities in Tang annals as early Tai or Siamese states linking Champa with the Chao Phraya basin. Hiram Woodward considers this linguistic argument tendentious.

Song period Chinese sources describe Xiān guó (暹國) in the western Chao Phraya region, while the east was associated with Lavo. By the 13th and 14th centuries, Siamese polities like Phrip Phri, Suphan Buri, Ayodhya and Sukhothai appeared independently in Chinese records. Evidence for relations with Chenla appears in the Wat Kud Tae inscription, recording a royal marriage. A Champa inscription records Siamese and Angkorian forces attacking Vijaya in 1201. Zhou Daguan reported Siamese influence over Lavapura and their presence in Yaśodharapura.

=== Xiān and Chen Li Fu (12th–14th centuries) ===
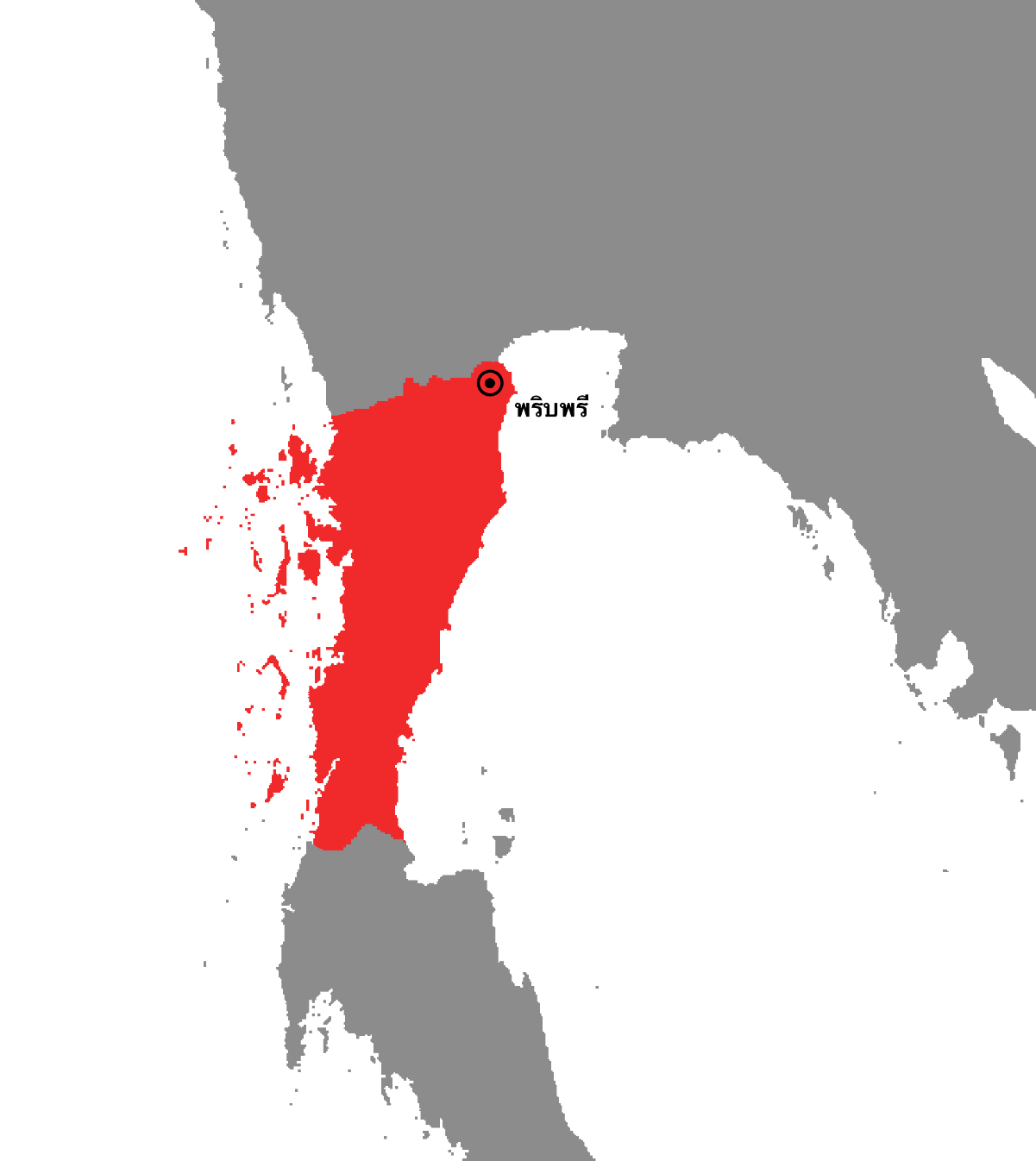
Proposed extent of the Xiān polity of Phrip Phri in the late 12th century.

Before Xiān, Chinese records describe Chên Li Fu, a polity west of Chenla. It sent embassies to the Song court in the early 1200s. Its ruler, Sri Mahidharavarman, bore the Khmer title kamrateng. Its tribute included elephants, ivory, and rhinoceros horn, but the Song court instructed Chên Li Fu to send no further tribute due to distance.

The earliest notices of Xiān are Vietnamese, detailing merchant ships from Xiān reaching Hǎidōng (海東) in 1149. Xiān sent tribute in 1182, and merchants returned in 1241. Chinese records use Xiān for polities of the lower Chao Phraya, which Yoneo Ishii interpreted as several port polities rather than a single state. Xiān first appears in the Chinese record in 1282 or 1283 and sent tribute missions frequently between 1292 and 1323. Lavo, Suphan Buri, Ayodhya and Phetchaburi each dealt with China in its own name before the union of 1349.

The Yuan court's dealings with Xiān indicate a negotiated relationship. Envoys sent to demand submission in 1293 were refused, and the king came in person with tribute in 1295. An edict of 1295 ordered Xiān not to harm Ma-li-yu-er (Melayu), with whom it had long been at war. The older identification of Xiān with Sukhothai was challenged in 1989 by Yamamoto Tatsurō, who noted that a gazetteer places Sukhothai under Xiān and therefore distinguishes the two.

=== Sukhothai Kingdom (1238–1438) ===
Sukhothai Kingdom

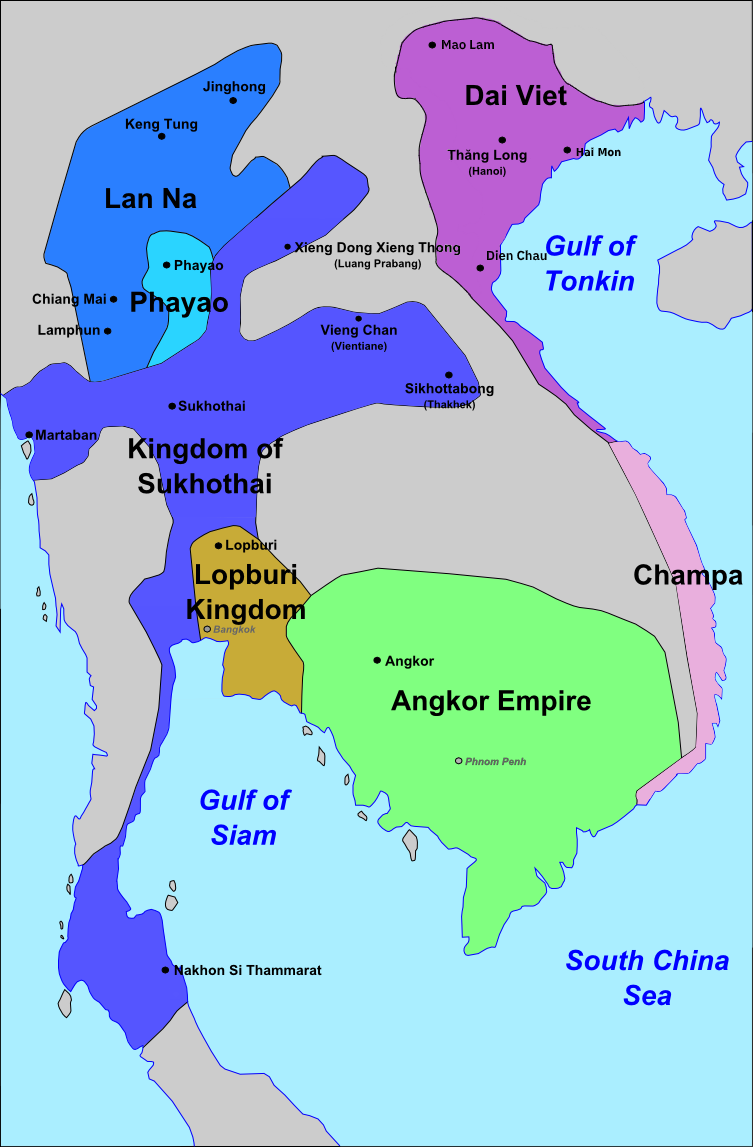
Sukhothai and neighbours, end of 13th century CE

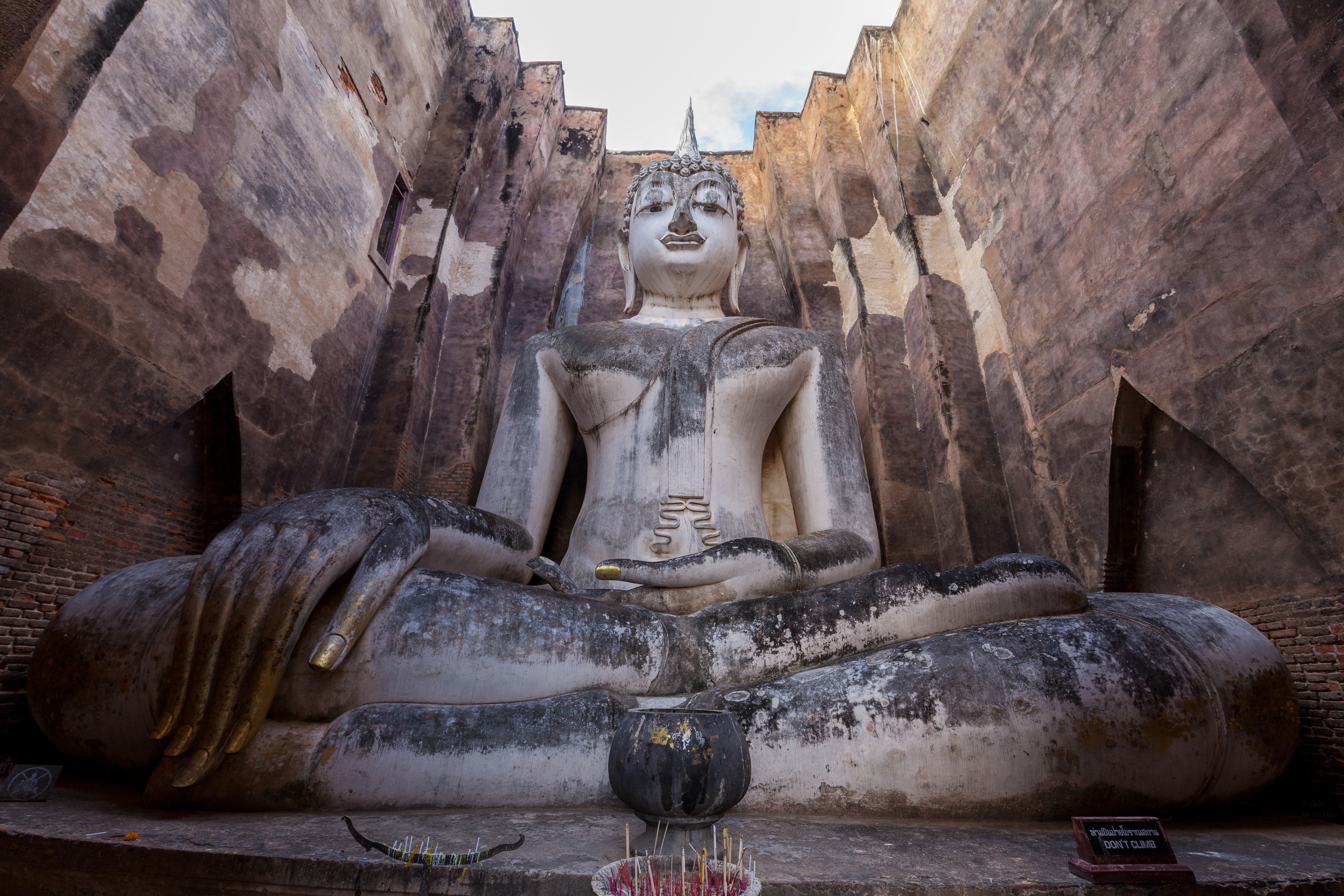
Phra Achana, Wat Si Chum, Sukhothai Historical Park

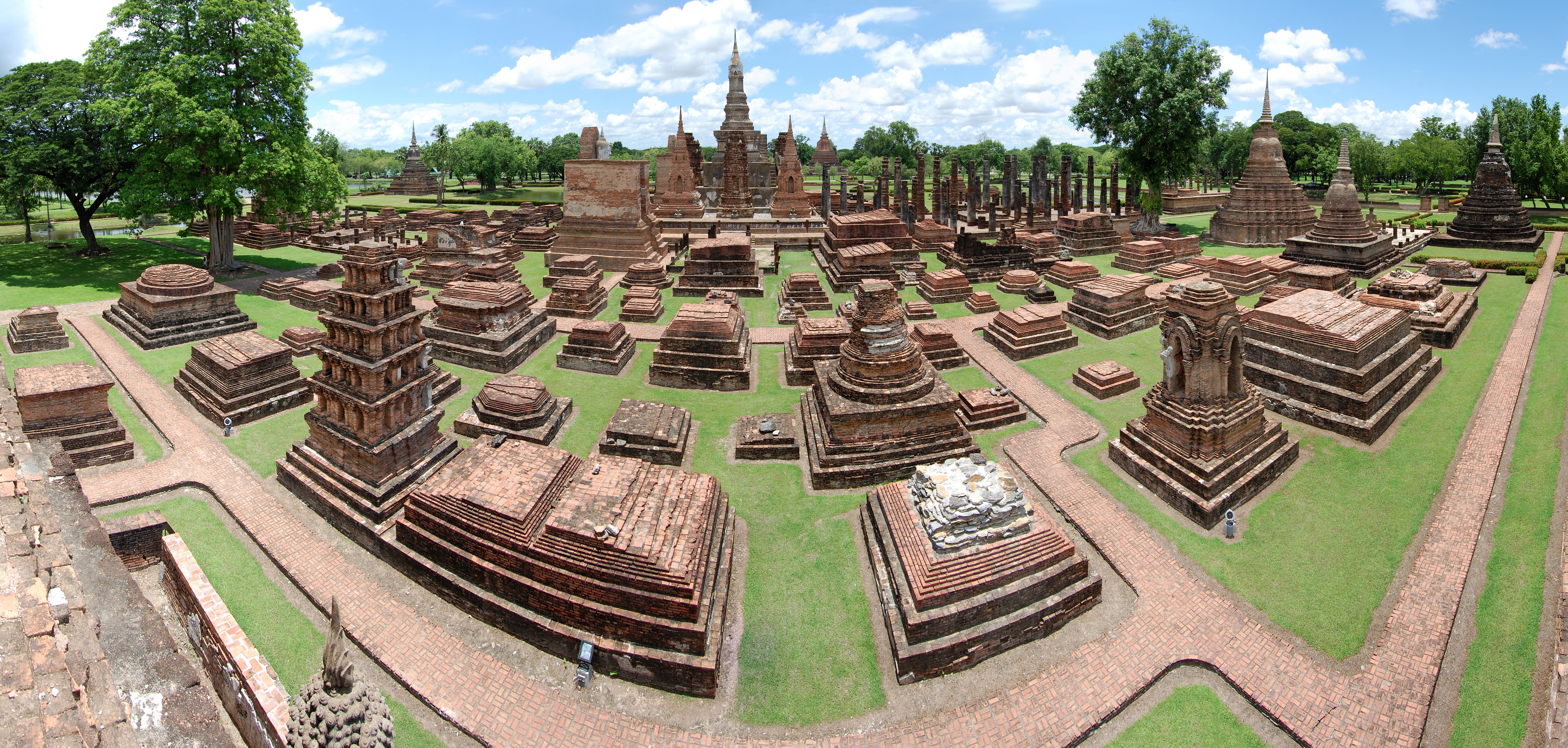
The ruins of Wat Mahathat, Sukhothai Historical Park

After the decline of the Khmer Empire and Kingdom of Pagan in the early 13th century, Tai domains stretched from present-day India to the Malay Peninsula. During the 13th century, Tai people settled in the core lands of Dvaravati and Lavo down to Nakhon Si Thammarat.

In 1238, Pho Khun Bang Klang Hao rallied local populations to rebel against the Khmer, crowning himself the first king of the Sukhothai Kingdom. Thai historians count Sukhothai as the first kingdom of the Thai people. It expanded furthest under Ram Khamhaeng, functioning mostly as a network of local lords rather than a tightly controlled empire. He is believed to have invented the Thai script. Sukhothai embraced Theravada Buddhism under Maha Thammaracha I.

=== Ayutthaya Kingdom (1351–1767) ===
Ayutthaya Kingdom

Ayutthaya and neighbours, c. 1390 CE

Ayutthaya and neighbours, c. 1540 CE

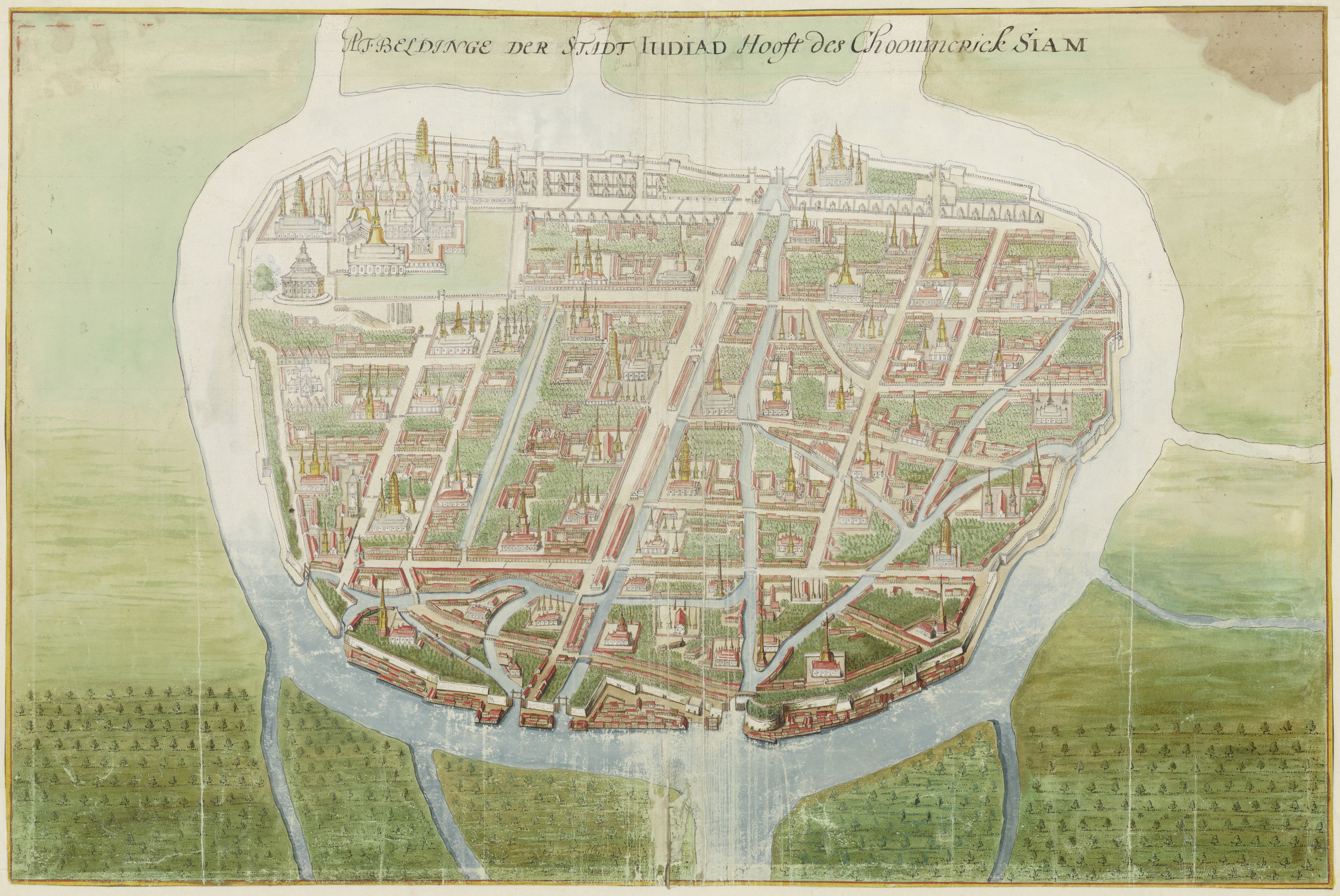
Painting of Ayutthaya city c. 1665, by Johannes Vingboons

The Ayutthaya Kingdom rose from the earlier Lavo Kingdom and Suphannaphum with Uthong as its first king. Ayutthaya was a patchwork of self-governing principalities and tributary provinces under the mandala system. Its initial expansion was achieved through conquest and political marriage.

Before the end of the 15th century, Ayutthaya invaded the Khmer Empire three times, sacking its capital Angkor. This marked a major geopolitical shift, allowing Ayutthaya to eclipse the Khmer Empire in mainland Southeast Asia. Sukhothai was steadily incorporated into the kingdom through dynastic marriages. King Borommatrailokkanat brought about bureaucratic reforms and created the sakdina social hierarchy, instituting male corvée labour.

European contact began with the Portuguese in 1511. The French, Dutch, and English followed in the 17th century. Rivalry for supremacy over Chiang Mai pitted Ayutthaya against Burma's Taungoo dynasty, leading to the capture of the capital in 1570. This brief period of vassalage ended when Naresuan proclaimed independence in 1584.

The kingdom prospered during Narai's reign (1656–1688), becoming an Asian great power alongside China and India. Growing French influence, however, led to nationalist backlash and the Siamese revolution of 1688. After dynastic struggles, Ayutthaya entered a "golden age" of flourishing art and literature. The final fifty years were marked by violent succession crises. In 1765, the Burmese under the Alaungpaya dynasty invaded, and after a 14-month siege, Ayutthaya fell and was burned in April 1767.

=== Thonburi Kingdom (1767–1782) ===
Following Ayutthaya's fall, the region fractured into five warlord domains. Chao Tak, a military leader based in Chanthaburi, successfully retook Ayutthaya from the Burmese just seven months later.

Crowning himself King Taksin, he established Thonburi as his temporary capital. He subdued rival warlords and waged wars to drive the Burmese out of Lan Na in 1775, capture Vientiane in 1778, and install a pro-Thai king in Cambodia. In his final years, his alleged insanity led to a coup, resulting in Taksin's execution by General Chao Phraya Chakri. Chakri became the first king of the Chakri dynasty and founded the Rattanakosin Kingdom on 6 April 1782.

=== Rattanakosin Kingdom and modernisation (1782–1932) ===
Rattanakosin Kingdom

Detailed map of Siam's provinces, vassals, and monthons in 1900

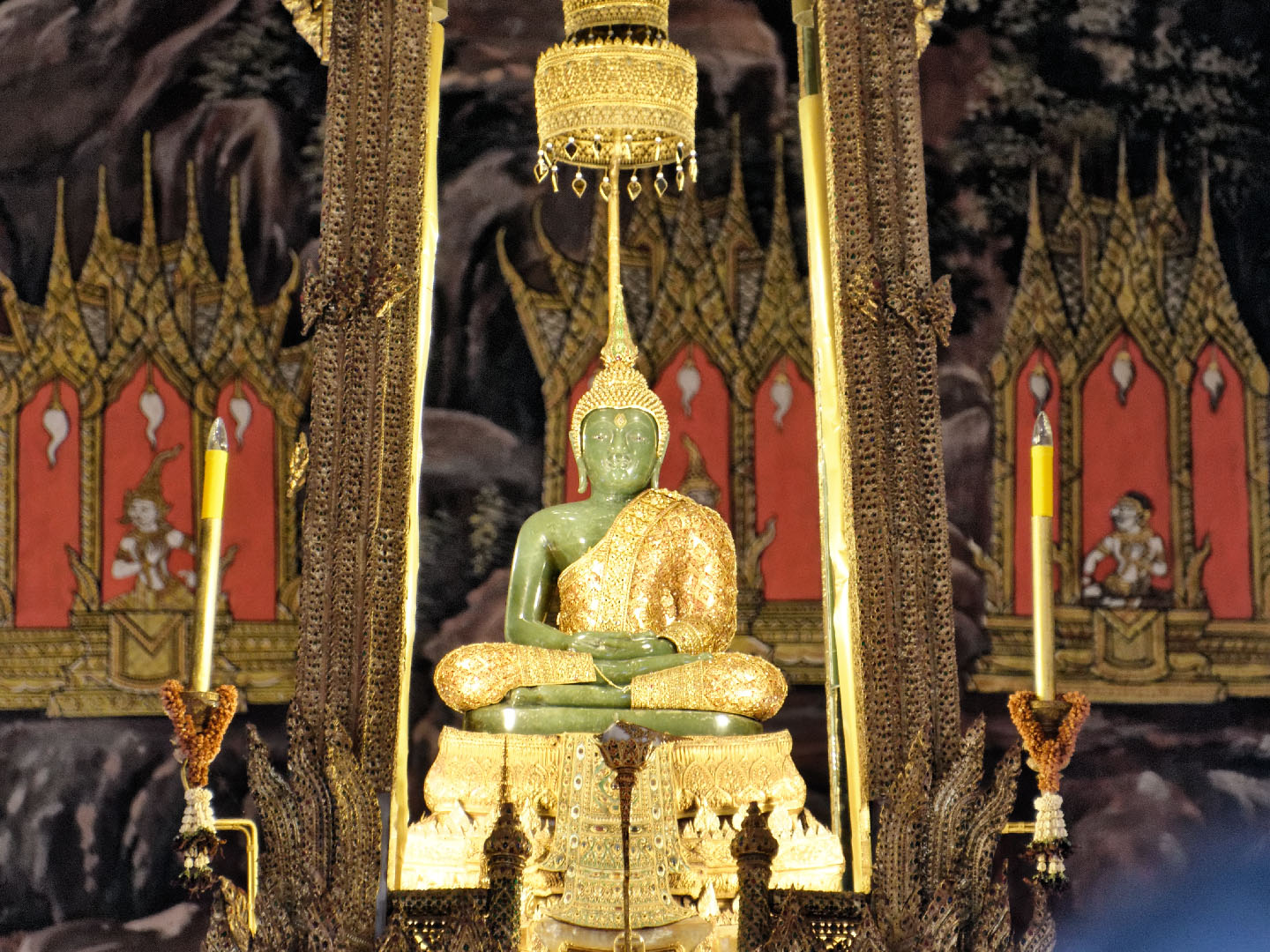
Emerald Buddha in Wat Phra Kaew. Considered the sacred palladium of Thailand.

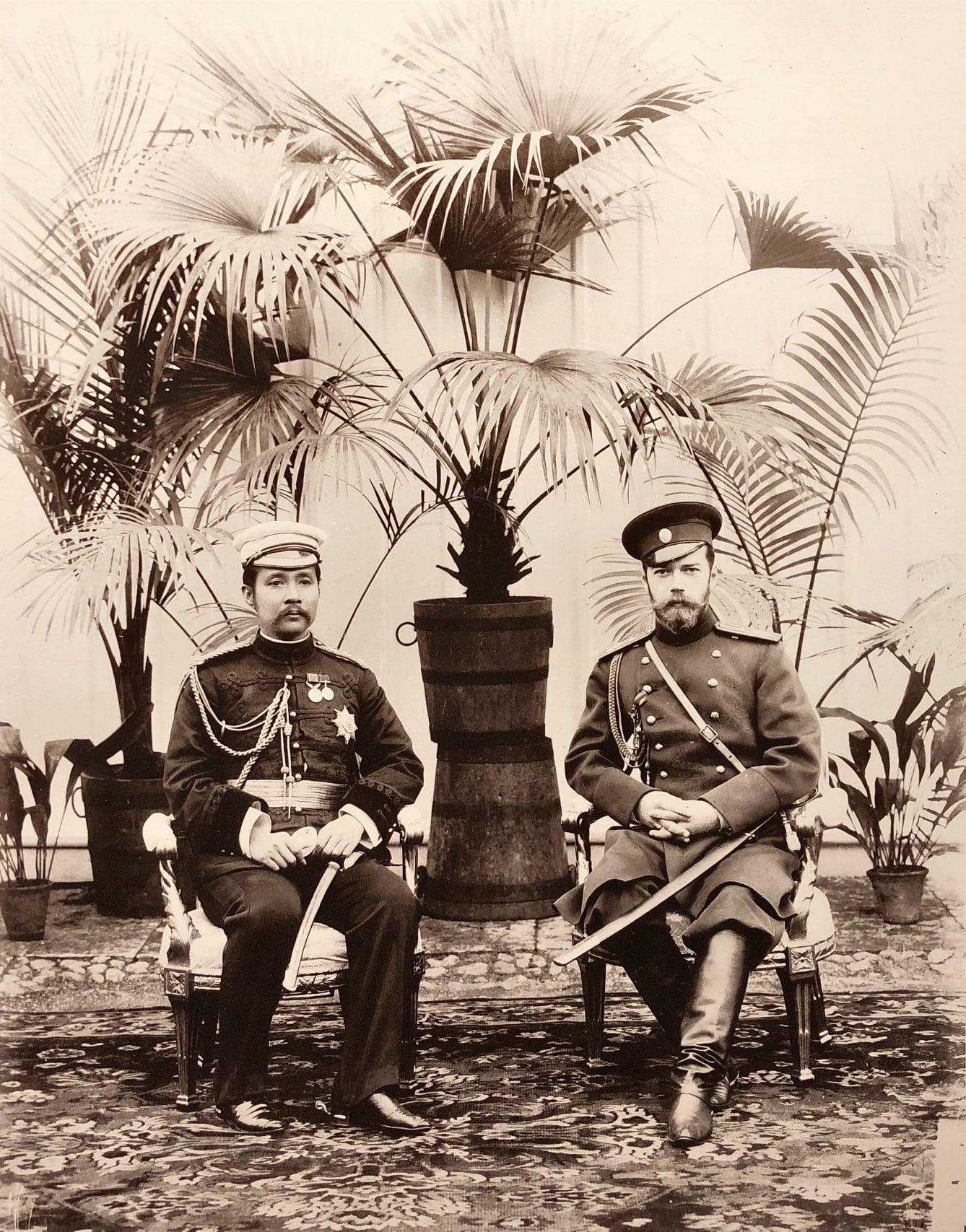
Chulalongkorn with Nicholas II in Saint Petersburg, 1897

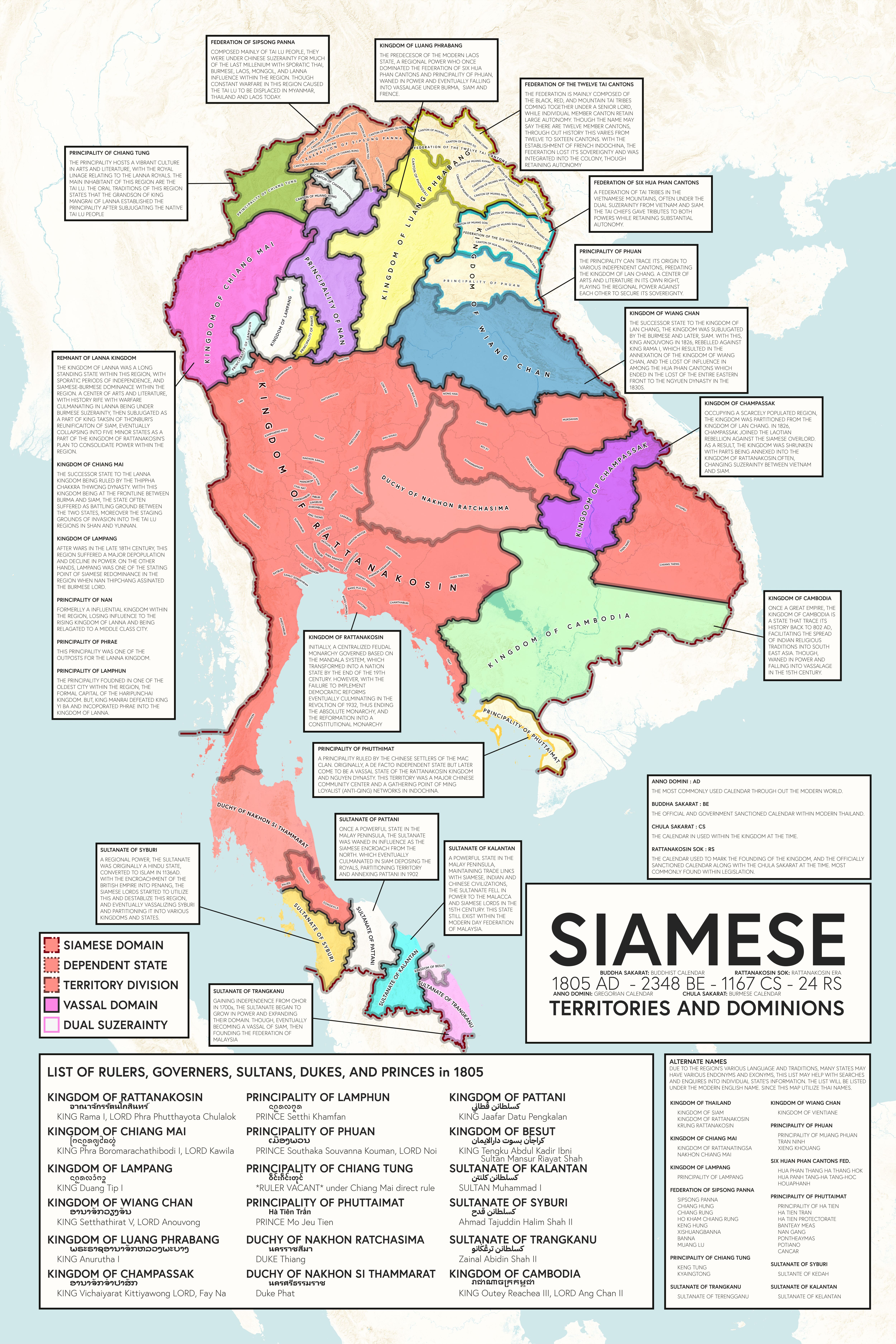
Siamese territory and dominion at its largest in 1805, resulting from the Burmese–Siamese War (1802–1805)

Under Rama I, Rattanakosin defended against Burmese incursions and established suzerainty over large parts of Laos and Cambodia. In 1821, John Crawfurd negotiated trade with Siam. Bangkok signed the Burney Treaty in 1826.

Anouvong's Lao rebellion was suppressed in 1826, destroying Vientiane. Bangkok also fought several wars with Vietnam to regain Cambodia.

Siam faced pressure from Western powers. King Mongkut (1851–1868) signed the Bowring Treaty, the first of many unequal treaties, which nevertheless spurred trade and development. King Chulalongkorn accelerated modernisation, abolishing slavery and the corvée system, and centralising administration into a modern nation-state. The 1893 Franco-Siamese crisis cost Siam territories east of the Mekong.

Thailand remains the only Southeast Asian state never colonised by a Western power, partly because Britain and France maintained it as a buffer state. Under Vajiravudh, nationalist ideas spread, and Siam joined the First World War on the side of the Allies, allowing it to eventually revoke extraterritoriality.

=== Military dictatorship (1932–1973) ===
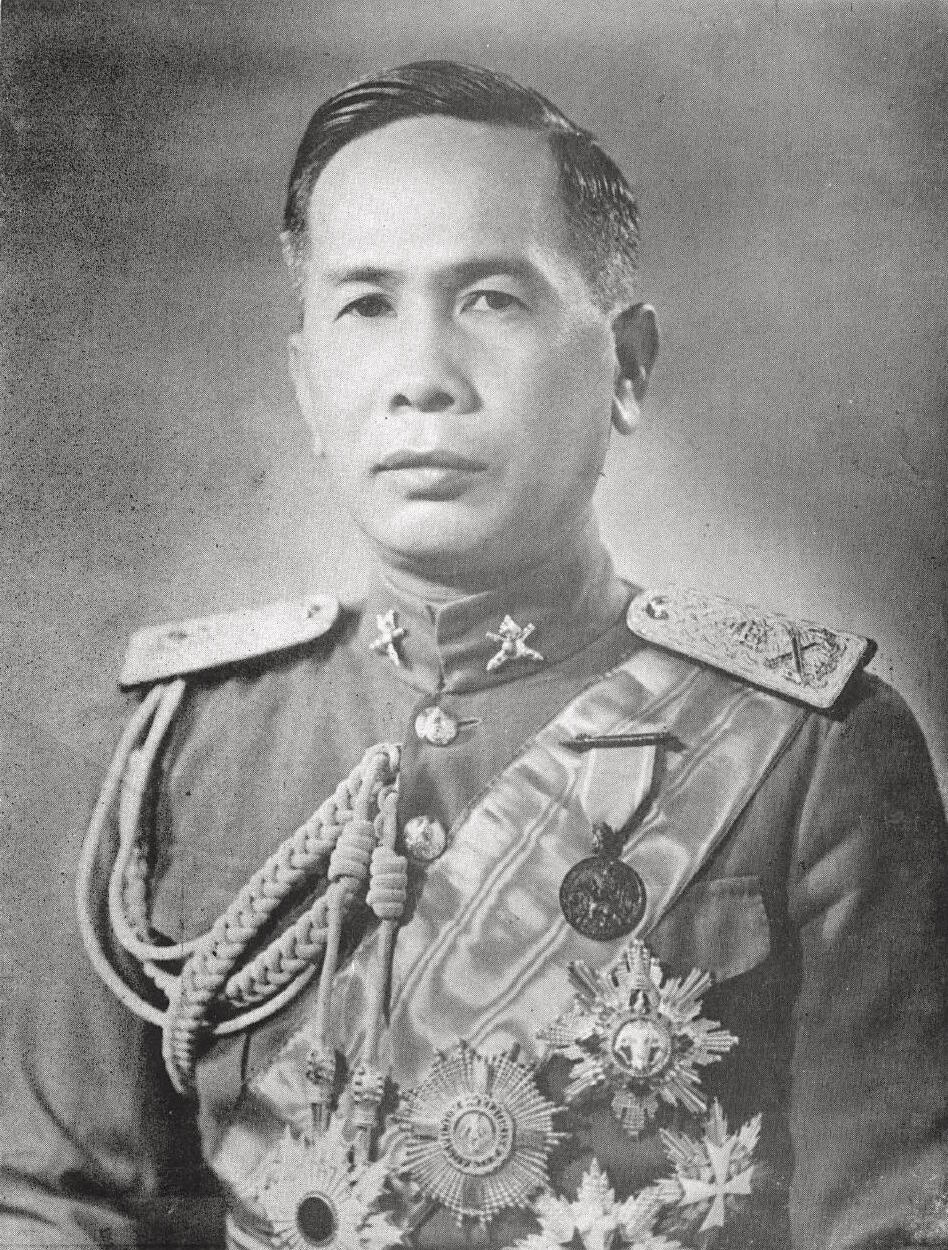
Field Marshal Plaek Phibunsongkhram

Economic hardships during the Great Depression undermined the absolute monarchy. The bloodless Siamese revolution of 1932 led by the Khana Ratsadon forced King Prajadhipok to sign a constitution. Following rebellions, military influence grew. King Prajadhipok abdicated, and the young Ananda Mahidol became king.

Military strongman Plaek Phibunsongkhram became premier in 1938, launching a nationalist, Irredentist, and pro-fascist agenda, changing the country's name to "Thailand". In 1940, Phibun launched the Franco-Thai War to reclaim territories from French Indochina. Following a brief resistance against the Japanese invasion in 1941, Thailand allied with Japan and declared war on the US and UK. The Free Thai Movement resisted the occupation.

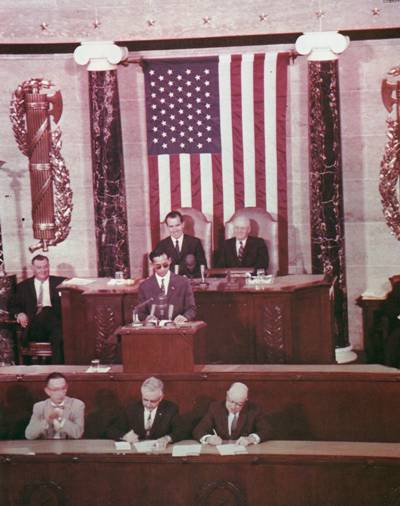
King Bhumibol Adulyadej addresses a joint session of the United States Congress, 1960.

In 1946, King Ananda died under mysterious circumstances, and Bhumibol Adulyadej ascended to the throne. Phibun returned via coup in 1947, aligned Thailand with the US in the Korean War, and helped establish the Southeast Asia Treaty Organization (SEATO). He was ousted in 1957 by Field Marshal Sarit Thanarat, who reinstated autocracy, rooted legitimacy in the monarchy, and aligned with the US during the Vietnam War, executing an anti-communist campaign. The era saw rapid modernisation and urbanisation, but bred opposition among a growing middle class and students.

=== Transition towards democracy (1973–2001) ===
The 1973 Thai popular uprising overthrew the military regime. King Bhumibol appointed a civilian prime minister, initiating a brief parliamentary democracy. Political instability and fears of communist expansion culminated in the Thammasat University massacre and a return to right-wing military rule.

Under Prem Tinsulanonda in the 1980s, Thailand enjoyed economic growth and semi-democracy ("premocracy"), successfully ending the communist insurgency. In 1988, Chatichai Choonhavan became the first freely elected prime minister since 1976. A 1991 coup and subsequent attempt by Suchinda Kraprayoon to retain power sparked the Black May protests in 1992, resulting in a bloody crackdown until King Bhumibol intervened. Free elections returned, leading to the creation of the progressive 1997 "People's Constitution."

=== Shinawatra era (2001–present) ===
The 1997 Asian financial crisis devastated the economy, necessitating an International Monetary Fund bailout. The crisis propelled populist Thaksin Shinawatra and his Thai Rak Thai Party to power. Thaksin's policies reduced rural poverty and provided universal healthcare, but alienated the urban elite and royalists. Crises including the southern Thailand insurgency and the 2004 Indian Ocean earthquake and tsunami further polarised the nation.

Massive protests by the conservative and royalist People's Alliance for Democracy (PAD) led to a military coup in 2006 that ousted Thaksin.

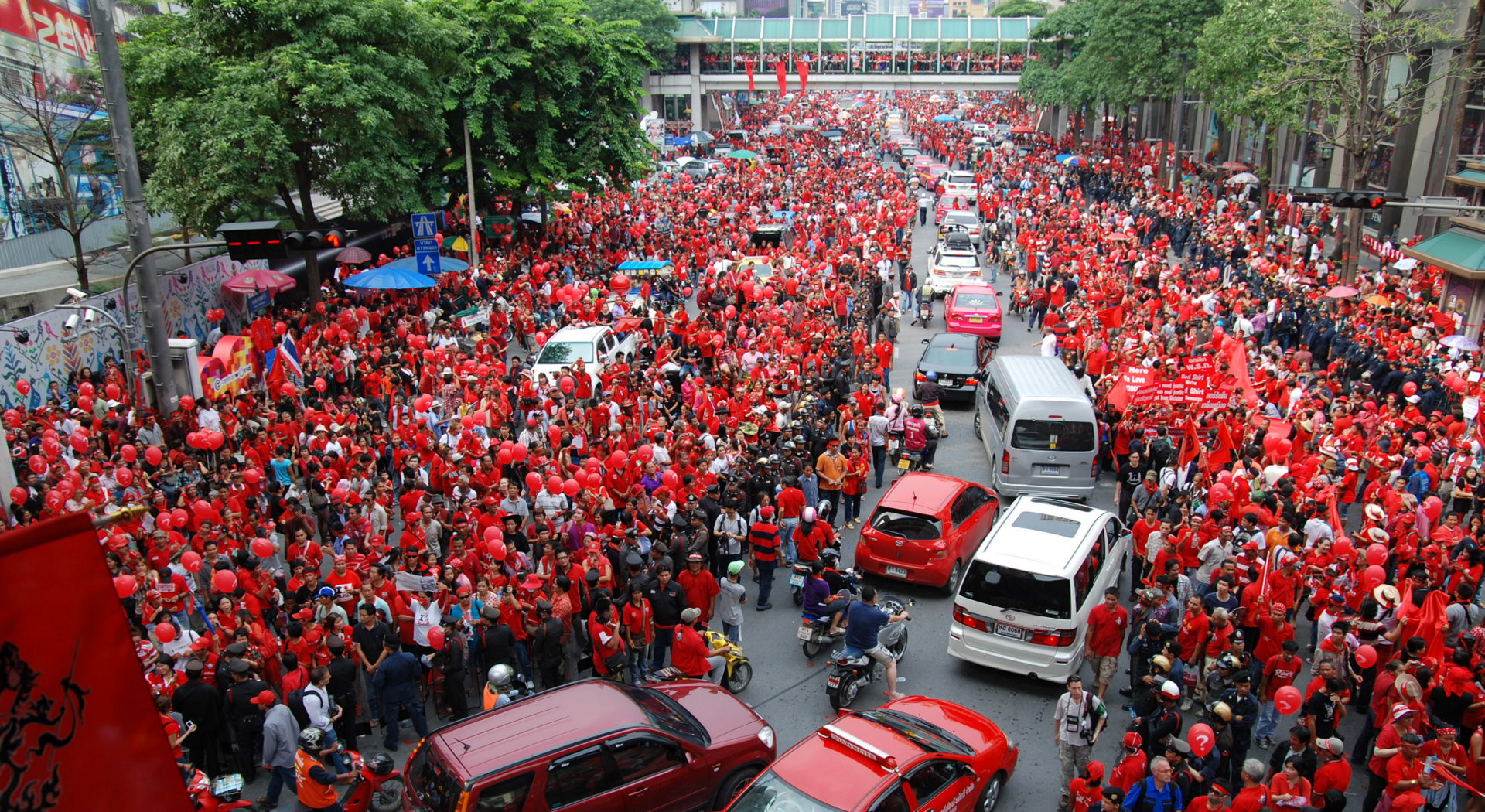
United Front for Democracy Against Dictatorship, Red Shirts, protest in 2010

Following the coup, resistance persisted. The Thaksin-aligned People's Power Party won elections in 2007, but PAD protests led to its dissolution, installing the Democrat Party. Pro-Thaksin forces under the United Front for Democracy Against Dictatorship (UDD) intensely protested both in 2009 and 2010.

Following a period of intense political polarisation, the military seized power in a 2014 coup led by General Prayut Chan-o-cha, establishing a junta that governed for nearly a decade. The 2023 general election marked a significant transition of power away from military-aligned parties to a coalition led by the Pheu Thai Party, ending nine years of royalist-military rule.

The subsequent years were characterised by renewed political instability and significant judicial intervention, which led to the consecutive removals of prime ministers Srettha Thavisin and Paetongtarn Shinawatra. Amidst this domestic turbulence, temporary violent clashes along the Cambodian border in 2025 shifted national focus. The instability culminated in the parliamentary election of Anutin Charnvirakul as prime minister, who quickly dissolved the House and led his Bhumjaithai Party to victory in the 2026 election, marking a major electoral revival for Thai conservatism.

== Geography ==
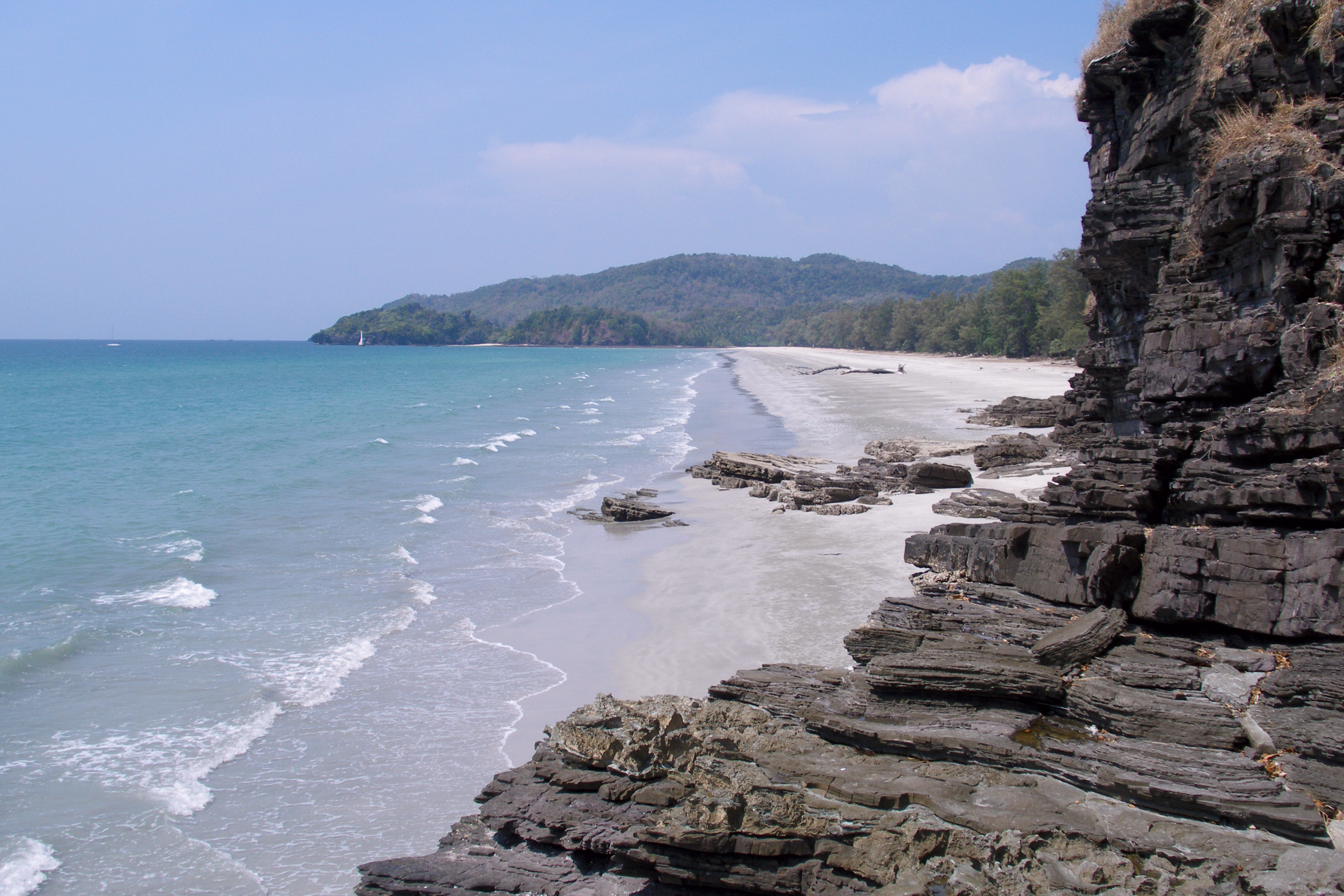
Ko Tarutao, Satun

Totalling 513,120 square kilometres (198,120 sq mi), Thailand is the 50th-largest country by total area. Thailand comprises several distinct geographic regions, partly corresponding to the provincial groups. The north of the country is the mountainous area of the Thai highlands, with the highest point being Doi Inthanon in the Thanon Thong Chai Range at 2,565 metres (8,415 ft) above sea level. The northeast, Isan, consists of the Khorat Plateau, bordered to the east by the Mekong River. The centre of the country is dominated by the predominantly flat Chao Phraya River valley, which runs into the Gulf of Thailand. Southern Thailand consists of the narrow Kra Isthmus that widens into the Malay Peninsula.

The Chao Phraya and the Mekong River are the indispensable water courses of rural Thailand. Industrial-scale production of crops uses both rivers and their tributaries. The Gulf of Thailand covers 320,000 square kilometres (124,000 sq mi) and is fed by the Chao Phraya, Mae Klong, Bang Pakong, and Tapi Rivers. It contributes to the tourism sector owing to its clear shallow waters along the coasts in the southern region and the Kra Isthmus. The eastern shore has the kingdom's premier deepwater port in Sattahip and its busiest commercial port, Laem Chabang. Phuket, Krabi, Ranong, Phang Nga and Trang, and their islands, all lie along the coasts of the Andaman Sea and host luxurious resorts.

=== Climate ===
Thailand map of Köppen climate classification

The climate is influenced by monsoon winds that have a seasonal character (the southwest and northeast monsoon). Most of the country is classified as Köppen's tropical savanna climate. The majority of the south, as well as the eastern tip, have a tropical monsoon climate. Parts of the south also have a tropical rainforest climate. A year in Thailand is divided into three seasons. The first is the rainy or southwest monsoon season (mid–May to mid–October), which is caused by southwestern wind from the Indian Ocean.

Rainfall is also contributed by Intertropical Convergence Zone and tropical cyclones, with August and September being the wettest period of the year. The country receives a mean annual rainfall of 1,200 to 1,600 mm (47 to 63 in). Winter or the northeast monsoon occurs from mid-October until mid-February. Most of Thailand experiences dry weather with mild temperatures. Summer or the pre-monsoon season runs from mid-February until mid-May.

Due to their inland position and latitude, the north, northeast, central and eastern parts of Thailand experience a long period of warm weather, where temperatures can reach up to 40 °C (104 °F) during March to May, in contrast to close to or below 0 °C (32 °F) in some areas in winter. Southern Thailand is characterised by mild weather year-round with less diurnal and seasonal variations in temperatures due to maritime influences. It receives abundant rainfall, particularly during October to November. Thailand is among the world's ten countries that are most exposed to climate change. In particular, it is highly vulnerable to rising sea levels and extreme weather events.

=== Biodiversity and conservation ===
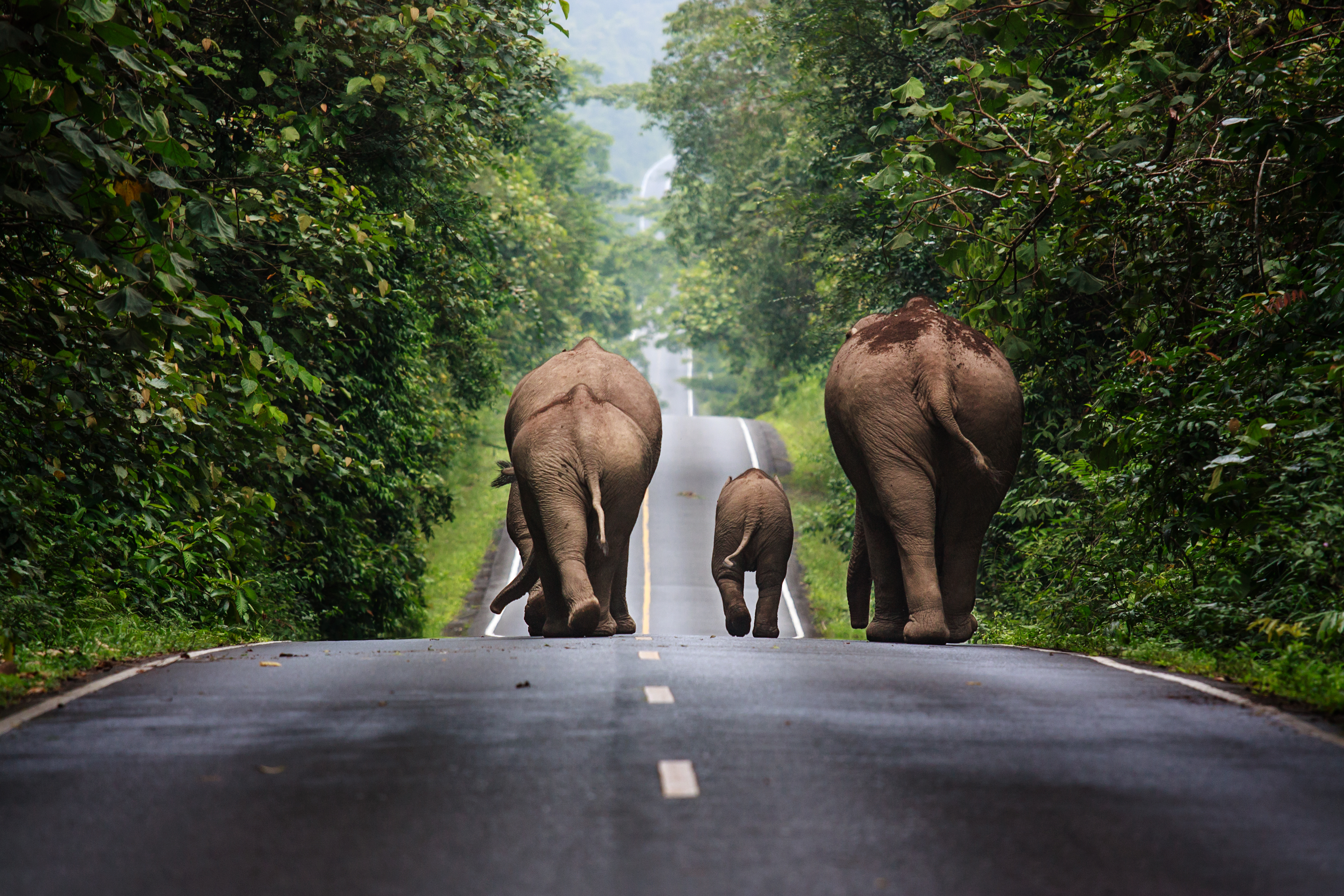
The population of Asian elephants in Thailand's wild has dropped to an estimated 2,000–3,000.

National parks in Thailand are defined as an area that contains natural resources of ecological importance or unique beauty, or flora and fauna of special importance. Protected areas include 156 national parks, 58 wildlife sanctuaries, 67 non-hunting areas, and 120 forest parks. They cover almost 31 per cent of the country. The parks are administered by the National Parks, Wildlife and Plant Conservation Department of the Ministry of Natural Resources and Environment. The Khao Kheow Open Zoo in Chonburi is the second largest zoo in Asia. The largest national park is Kaeng Krachan National Park.

Reflecting on various environmental issues, Thailand has a mediocre but improving performance in the global Environmental Performance Index, with an overall ranking of 91 out of 180 countries in 2016. The environmental areas where Thailand performs worst (i.e., highest-ranking) are air quality (167), environmental effects of the agricultural industry (106), and the climate and energy sector (93), the latter mainly because of a high CO_{2} emission per kWh produced. Thailand performs best (i.e., lowest-ranking) in water resource management (66), with some major improvements expected for the future, and sanitation (68). The country had a 2019 Forest Landscape Integrity Index mean score of 6.00/10, ranking it 88th globally out of 172 countries.

The population of elephants, the national symbol, has fallen from 100,000 in 1850 to an estimated 2,000. Poachers have long hunted elephants for ivory and hides, and now increasingly for meat. Young elephants are often captured for use in tourist attractions or as work animals, where there have been claims of mistreatment. In 1989, the government banned the use of elephants for logging, leading many elephant owners to move their domesticated animals to the tourism industry.

Poaching of protected species remains a major problem. Tigers, leopards, and other large cats are hunted for their pelts. Many are farmed or hunted for their meat, which supposedly has medicinal properties. Although such trade is illegal, the well-known Bangkok market Chatuchak is still known for the sale of endangered species. The practice of keeping wild animals as pets affects species such as Asiatic black bear, Malayan sun bear, white-handed lar, pileated gibbon, and binturong.

== Politics and government ==
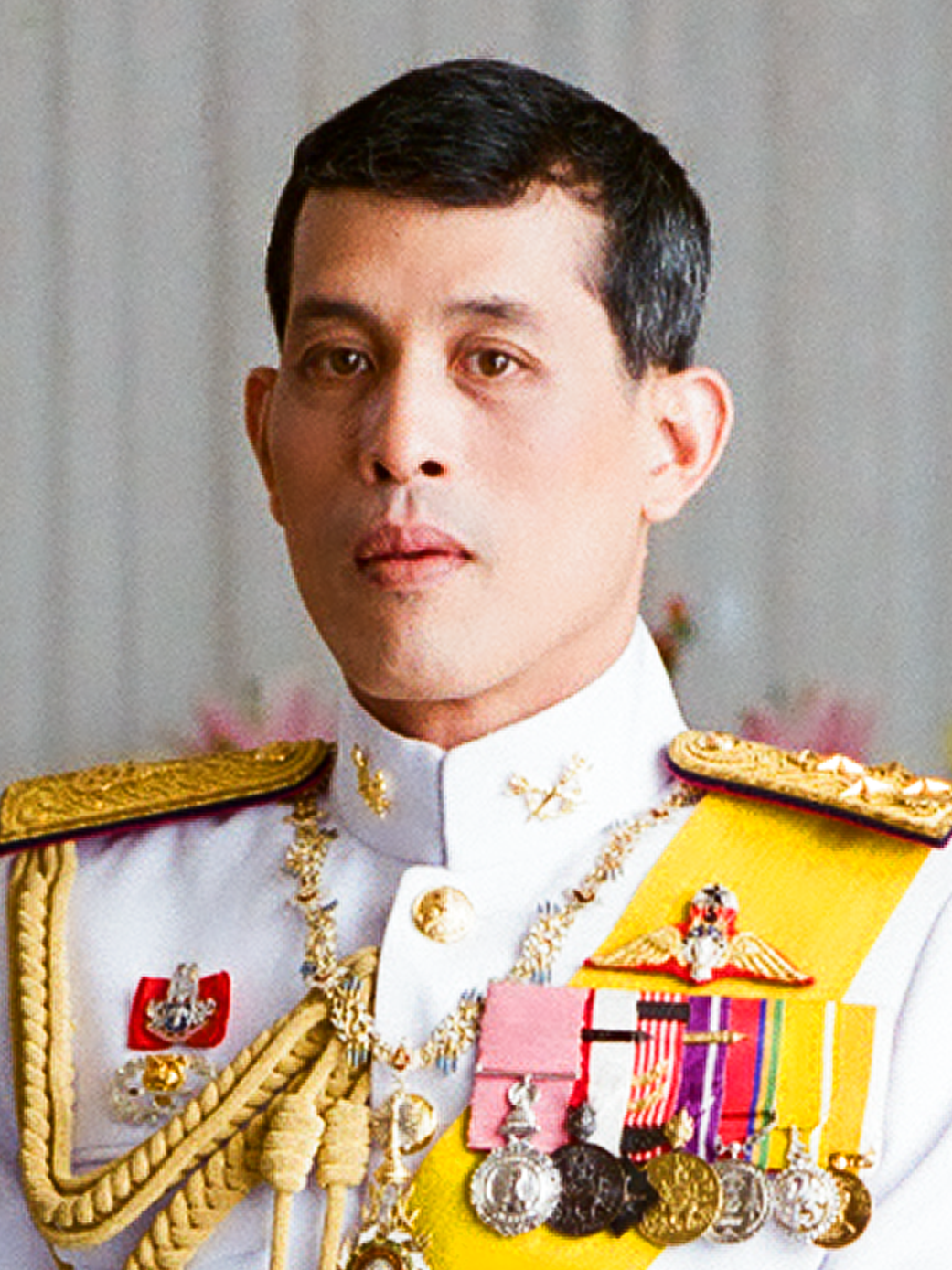
Vajiralongkorn
King of Thailand
since 13 October 2016

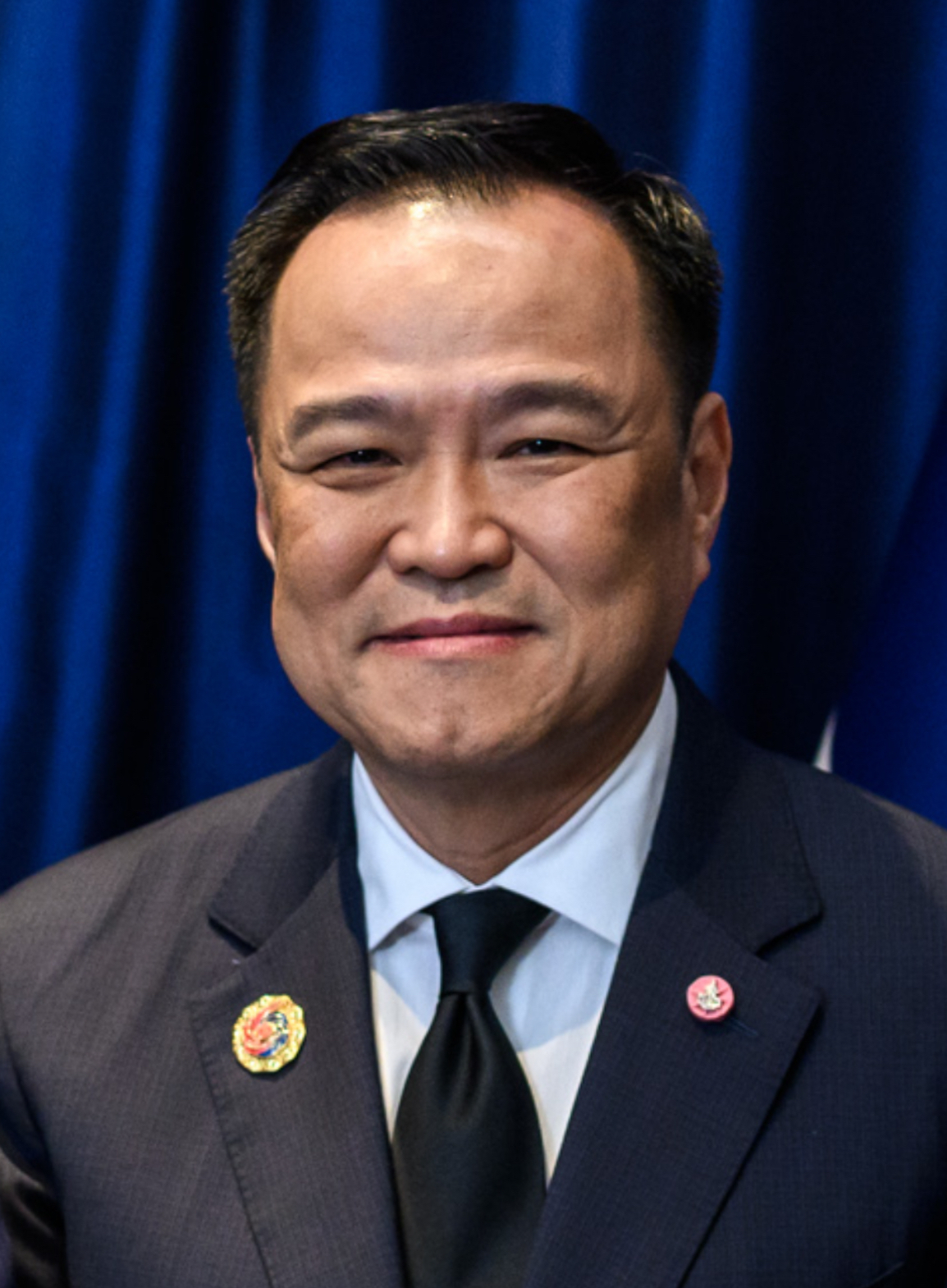
Anutin Charnvirakul
Prime Minister of Thailand
since 7 September 2025

Prior to 1932, Thai kings were feudal or absolute monarchs. During the Sukhothai Kingdom, the king was seen as a dharmaraja, or a 'king who rules in accordance with dharma'. The system of government was a network of tributaries ruled by local lords. Modern absolute monarchy and statehood were established by King Chulalongkorn when he transformed the decentralised protectorate system into a unitary state. On 24 June 1932, the Khana Ratsadon (People's Party) carried out a bloodless revolution that marked the beginning of a constitutional monarchy.

Thailand has had 20 constitutions and charters since 1932, including the current 2017 constitution. All constitutions state that politics are conducted within the framework of a constitutional monarchy, but the de facto form of government has ranged from military dictatorship to electoral democracy. Thailand's current form of government is a hybrid of democracy and dictatorship; many terms are used to describe it. (Note: Such as: "constitutional dictatorship" or "parliamentary dictatorship", "military coup regime", "semicivilian" or "semi-elected", "managed democracy", and "guided democracy".) Thailand has had the fourth-most coups in the world. "Uniformed or ex-military men have led Thailand for 55 of the 83 years" between 1932 and 2015. Most recently, a military junta calling itself the National Council for Peace and Order ruled the country between 2014 and 2019.

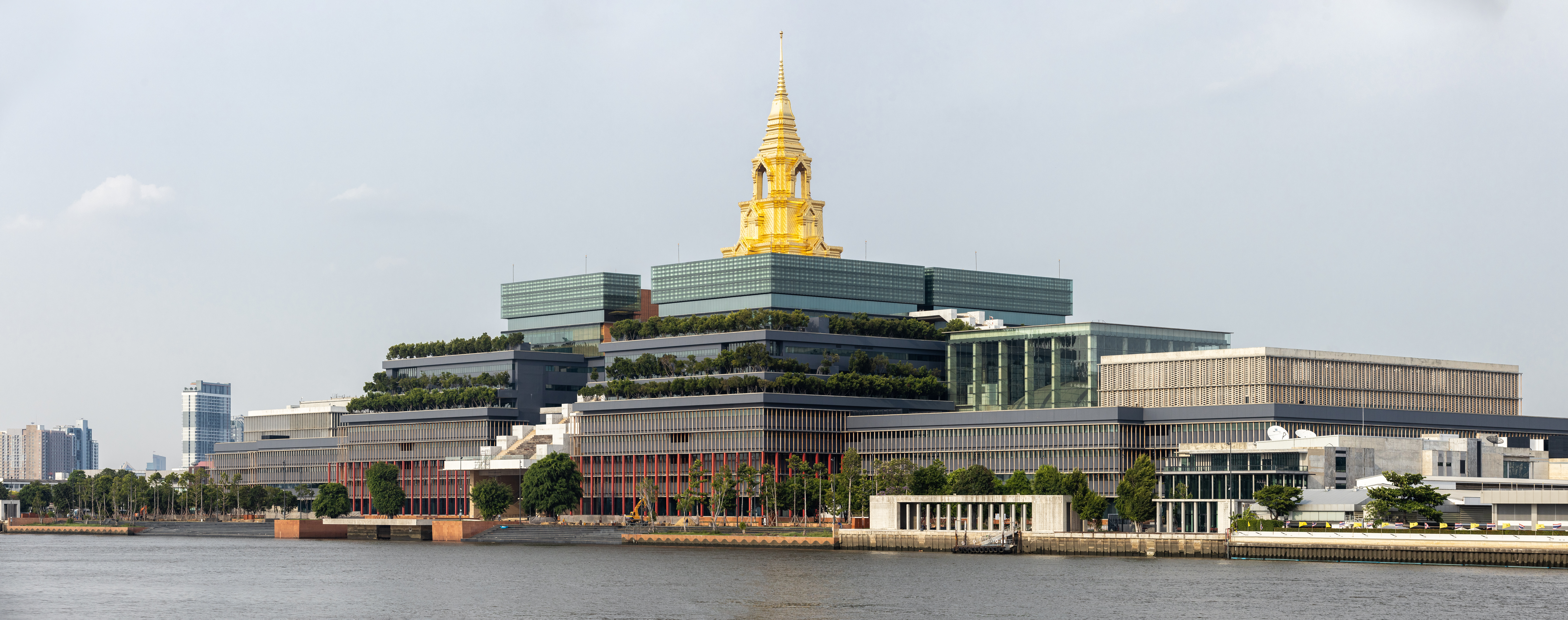
Sappaya-Sapasathan is the current Parliament House of Thailand

Government is separated into three branches:

- The legislative branch: The National Assembly is composed of the Senate, an indirectly elected 200-member upper house, and the House of Representatives, a directly elected 500-member lower house. Its most recent election was the 2026 general election. A coalition led by the Bhumjaithai Party currently holds the majority. The 2024 Thai Senate election was the first senate election held under the current constitution through a process criticised as "the most complicated election in the world". The Senate is allegedly dominated by Bhumjaithai Party-affiliated senators.
- The executive branch: Consists of the Prime Minister of Thailand, who serves as the head of government, and a cabinet of up to 35 members. The prime minister is elected by the House of Representatives. The current constitution mandates that the prime minister must be considered from candidates nominated by political parties before the election. The current prime minister is Anutin Charnvirakul, a member of the Bhumjaithai Party.
- The judiciary: Is nominally independent of the executive and legislative branches, although judicial rulings are often suspected of being based on political considerations rather than on existing law.

Military and bureaucratic aristocrats fully controlled political parties between 1946 and the 1980s. Most parties in Thailand are short-lived. Between 1992 and 2006, Thailand had a two-party system. Later constitutions created a multi-party system in which a single party cannot easily gain a majority in the House.

A hereditary monarch serves as head of state. The current King of Thailand is Vajiralongkorn (Rama X), who has reigned since October 2016. The powers of the king are limited by the constitution, and he is primarily a symbolic figurehead. However, the monarch still occasionally intervenes in politics, as all constitutions pave the way for customary royal rulings. Some academics outside Thailand, including Duncan McCargo and Federico Ferrara, note the extraconstitutional role of the monarch through a "network monarchy" behind the political scenes.

Timeline of Prime Ministers

The monarchy is protected by a severe lèse majesté law, even though the public's attitude towards the institution varies from one reign to another. Lèse-majesté laws allow critics to be jailed for three to fifteen years. After the coup d'état in 2014, Thailand had the highest number of lèse-majesté prisoners in the nation's history. Human rights in Thailand have been rated not free on the Freedom House Index since 2014.

In 2024, the Constitutional Court banned the victors of the 2023 parliamentary elections, the Move Forward Party, and all of its leaders from politics over their proposal to reform the lèse-majesté law, arguing it posed a threat to the constitutional order. The Economist criticised the move as an example of "lawfare" and pointed to the dissolution of its predecessor party, Future Forward, in 2020 as the latest example of how an "alliance of conservative forces in Thailand—including monarchists, the army, and a handful of business tycoons—has sought to suppress opposition".

In the Freedom in the World 2024 Report, the country's status improved from not free to partly free due to competitive parliamentary elections and the formation of a new governing coalition by what had been a major opposition party, though unelected senators ensured that the party with the most votes was excluded.

=== Administrative divisions ===
Thailand is a unitary state; the administrative services of the executive branch are divided into three levels by the National Government Organisation Act, BE 2534 (1991): central, provincial, and local. Thailand is composed of 76 provinces (จังหวัด, changwat), which are first-level administrative divisions. There are also two specially governed districts: the capital Bangkok and Pattaya. Bangkok is at the provincial level and is thus often counted as a province. Each province is divided into districts (อำเภอ, amphoe) and these districts are further divided into sub-districts (ตำบล, tambons). The name of each province's capital city (เมือง, mueang) is the same as that of the province. For example, the capital of Chiang Mai Province (Changwat Chiang Mai) is Mueang Chiang Mai or Chiang Mai. All provincial governors and district chiefs, who are the administrators of provinces and districts respectively, are appointed by the central government. The provinces are sometimes grouped into four to six regions, depending on the source.

A clickable map of Thailand exhibiting its provinces

A clickable map of Thailand exhibiting its provinces

=== Foreign relations ===
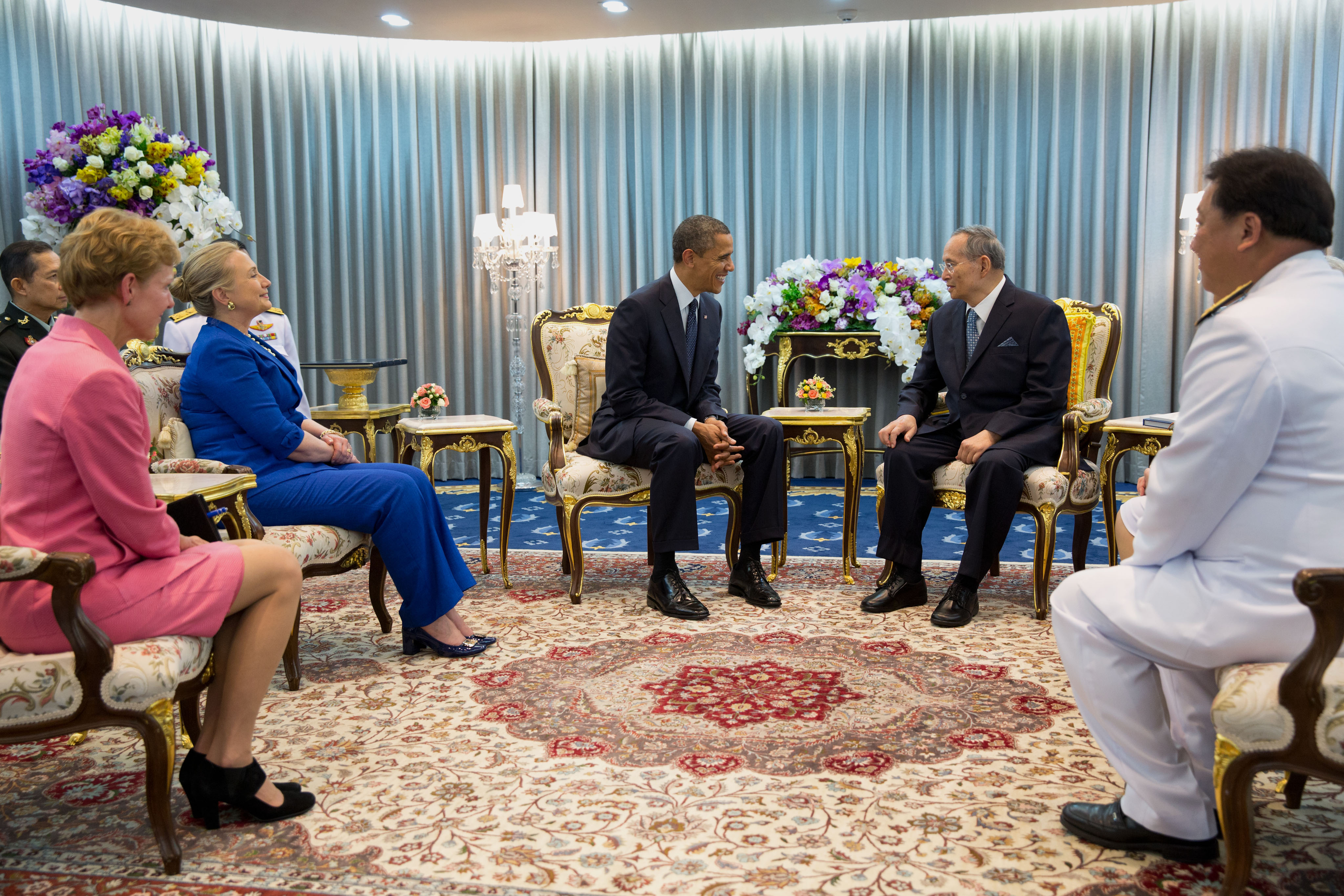
King Bhumibol Adulyadej in a meeting with US President Barack Obama, 18 November 2012

Siam and Thailand's approach to conducting foreign relations has long been described as "bamboo bending with the wind"—a policy that is "always solidly rooted, but flexible enough to bend whichever way the wind blows in order to survive"—or simply as adaptable and pragmatic. To secure its independence, the nation historically sought to balance great powers against one another so that it would be dominated by none.

During the Cold War, Thailand sought to prevent the spread of communism by aligning with the United States. This included participating in the SEATO alliance, sending expeditionary forces to Korea and Vietnam, and allowing the US to use its military bases. Thailand is one of the five founding members of the Association of Southeast Asian Nations (ASEAN), which was initially formed to safeguard against communism. The end of the Vietnam War marked a turning point in Thai foreign policy, after which the country sought to improve relations with communist China and its regional neighbours. Thailand remains an active member of ASEAN and seeks to project its influence within the bloc. It has developed increasingly close ties with other members, progressing regional cooperation in economic, trade, banking, political, and cultural matters.

In the 2000s, Thailand took an active role on the international stage, participating fully in international and regional organisations. It is designated as a major non-NATO ally and is on the Priority Watch List of the United States' Special 301 Report. When East Timor gained independence from Indonesia, Thailand contributed troops to the international peacekeeping effort. As part of its effort to expand international ties, Thailand has also reached out to regional organisations such as the Organization of American States (OAS) and the Organization for Security and Co-operation in Europe (OSCE).

During Thaksin Shinawatra's premiership, negotiations for several free trade agreements with China, Australia, Bahrain, India, and the US were initiated. Thaksin sought to position Thailand as a regional leader by spearheading development projects in poorer neighbouring countries. More controversially, he established close, friendly ties with the Burmese dictatorship. Thailand joined the US-led invasion of Iraq, contributing a humanitarian contingent until September 2004. Thailand also contributed troops to reconstruction efforts in Afghanistan.

In April 2009, the 2008–2013 Cambodian–Thai border crisis led to troop deployments on territory immediately adjacent to the 900-year-old ruins of Cambodia's Preah Vihear Hindu temple near the border.

Following the 2014 coup, Thailand began leaning more heavily towards China. Growing Chinese influence and capital inflows have caused some members of parliament to raise concerns about Thailand becoming an "economic colony" as a result of numerous concessions.

During the 2023 Israel–Gaza war, Thailand's prime minister initially stated that his government strongly condemned the attacks against Israel, extending his deepest condolences to the Israeli government and people. However, the Thai government later adjusted its position, announcing a neutral stance in the conflict. Twenty-eight Thai nationals were killed in the conflict.

=== Armed forces ===
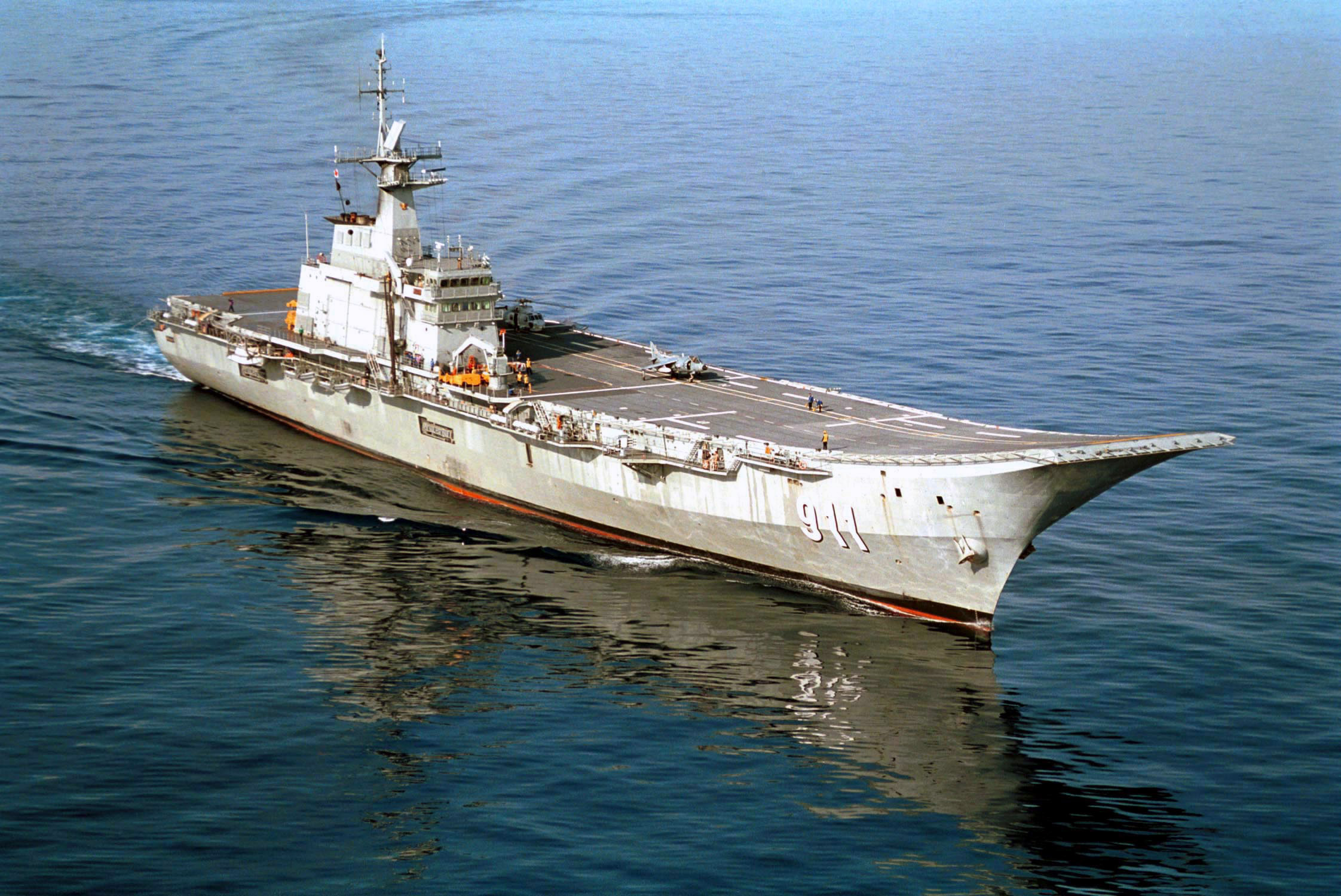
The HTMS Chakri Naruebet, an aircraft carrier of the Royal Thai Navy

The Royal Thai Armed Forces (กองทัพไทย; RTGS: Kong Thap Thai) consist of the Royal Thai Army (กองทัพบกไทย), the Royal Thai Navy (กองทัพเรือไทย), and the Royal Thai Air Force (กองทัพอากาศไทย). They also incorporate various paramilitary forces.

The head of the Thai Armed Forces (จอมทัพไทย, Chom Thap Thai) is the king, although this position is only nominal. The armed forces are managed by the Ministry of Defence of Thailand, which is headed by the Minister of Defence (a member of the cabinet of Thailand) and commanded by the Royal Thai Armed Forces Headquarters, which in turn is headed by the Chief of Defence Forces of Thailand. The annual defence budget almost tripled from US$1.98 billion in 2005 to US$5.88 billion in 2016, accounting for approximately 1.4% of GDP. Thailand ranked 16th worldwide in the Military Strength Index based on the Credit Suisse report in 2015.

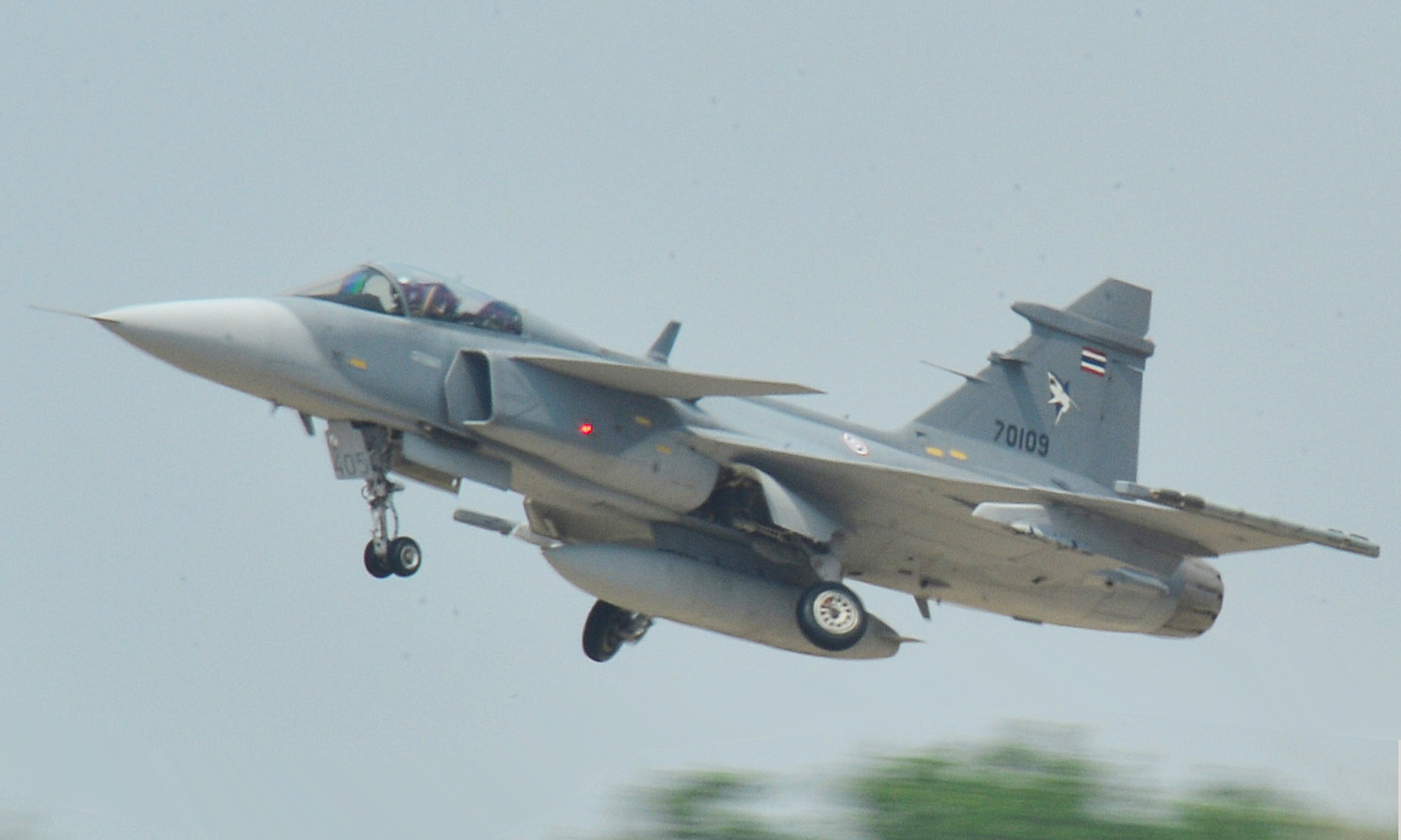
A Royal Thai Air Force JAS 39 Gripen

The military is also tasked with humanitarian missions, such as escorting Rohingya to Malaysia or Indonesia, and ensuring security and welfare for refugees during the Indochina refugee crisis.

According to the constitution, serving in the armed forces is a duty of all citizens, with an active draft system for males over age 21. They are subjected to varying lengths of active service depending on the duration of their reserve training as Territorial Defence Students and their level of education. Those who have completed three years or more of reserve training are exempted entirely. The practice has long been criticised, as some media outlets question its efficacy and value. It is alleged that conscripts often end up as servants to senior officers or clerks in military cooperative shops. In a report issued in March 2020, Amnesty International charged that military conscripts face institutionalised abuse that is systematically hushed up by military authorities.

Critics have observed that the military's main objective is to deal with internal rather than external threats. The Internal Security Operations Command is often called the political arm of the military, having overlapping social and political functions with the civilian bureaucracy. It also has an anti-democracy mission. The military is also notorious for numerous corruption incidents, such as accusations of human trafficking, and nepotism in the promotion of high-ranking officers. The military is deeply entrenched in politics. Most recently, the appointed senators included more than 100 active and retired military personnel.

Thailand is the 75th most peaceful country in the world, according to the 2024 Global Peace Index.

== Economy ==
Economic indicators
Nominal GDP	฿14.53 trillion (2016)
GDP growth	3.9% (2017)
Headline inflation	0.7% (2017)
Core inflation	0.6% (2017)
Employment-to-population ratio	68.0% (2017)
Unemployment	1.2% (2017)
Total public debt	฿6.37 trillion (Dec. 2017)
Poverty	8.61% (2016)
Net household worth	฿20.34 trillion (2010)

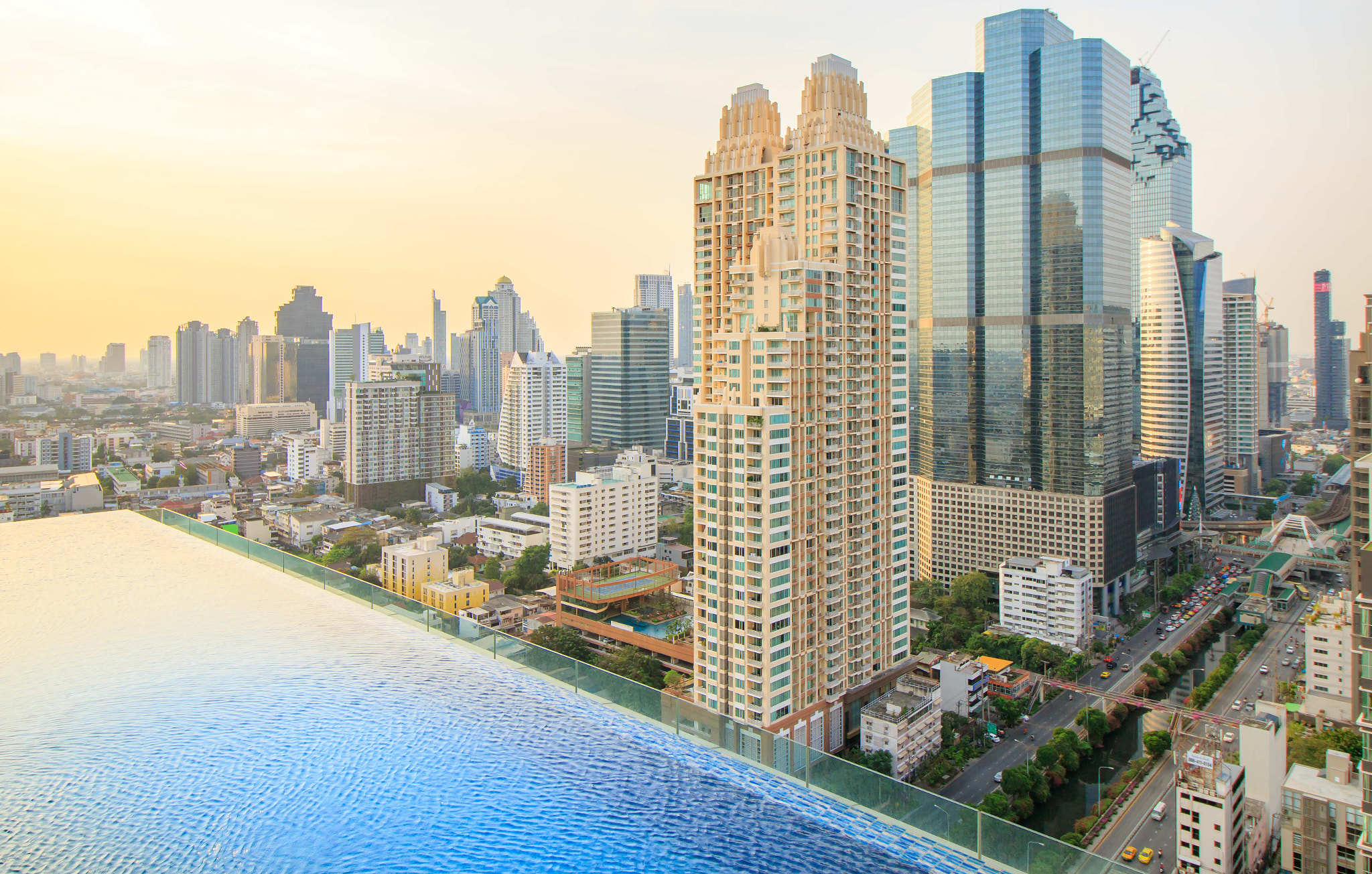
Sathorn in Bangkok is a skyscraper-studded business district that is home to major hotels and embassies.

The economy of Thailand is heavily export-dependent, with exports accounting for more than two-thirds of gross domestic product (GDP). Thailand exports over US$105 billion worth of goods and services annually. Major exports include cars, computers, electrical appliances, rice, textiles and footwear, fishery products, rubber, and jewellery.

Thailand is an emerging economy and is considered a newly industrialised country. Thailand had a 2026 GDP of US$1.964 trillion (on a purchasing power parity basis). It is the second-largest economy in Southeast Asia after Indonesia, and ranks midway in the region's wealth spread as the fourth-richest nation by GDP per capita.

Thailand functions as an anchor economy for the neighbouring developing economies of Laos, Myanmar, and Cambodia. In the third quarter of 2014, the unemployment rate stood at 0.84% according to Thailand's National Economic and Social Development Board. In 2017, the economy grew by an inflation-adjusted 3.9%, up from 3.3% in 2016, marking its fastest expansion since 2012. High public spending, especially during the COVID-19 pandemic, prompted the authorities to raise the public debt ceiling from 60% to 70% of GDP.

As of 2024, Thailand struggles with low productivity, poor education, high household debt, low private investment, and slow economic growth, with one economic research group forecasting an annual GDP growth of below 2% in the coming decades without structural reforms.

In 2025, the Bank of Thailand's economic outlook page projected GDP growth of around 2.2% in 2025 and 1.6% in 2026. The bank noted that growth in the first half of 2025 was supported by front‑loaded exports to the U.S. ahead of tariff hikes, while the second half was expected to slow as higher U.S. tariffs took effect.

=== Income and wealth disparities ===
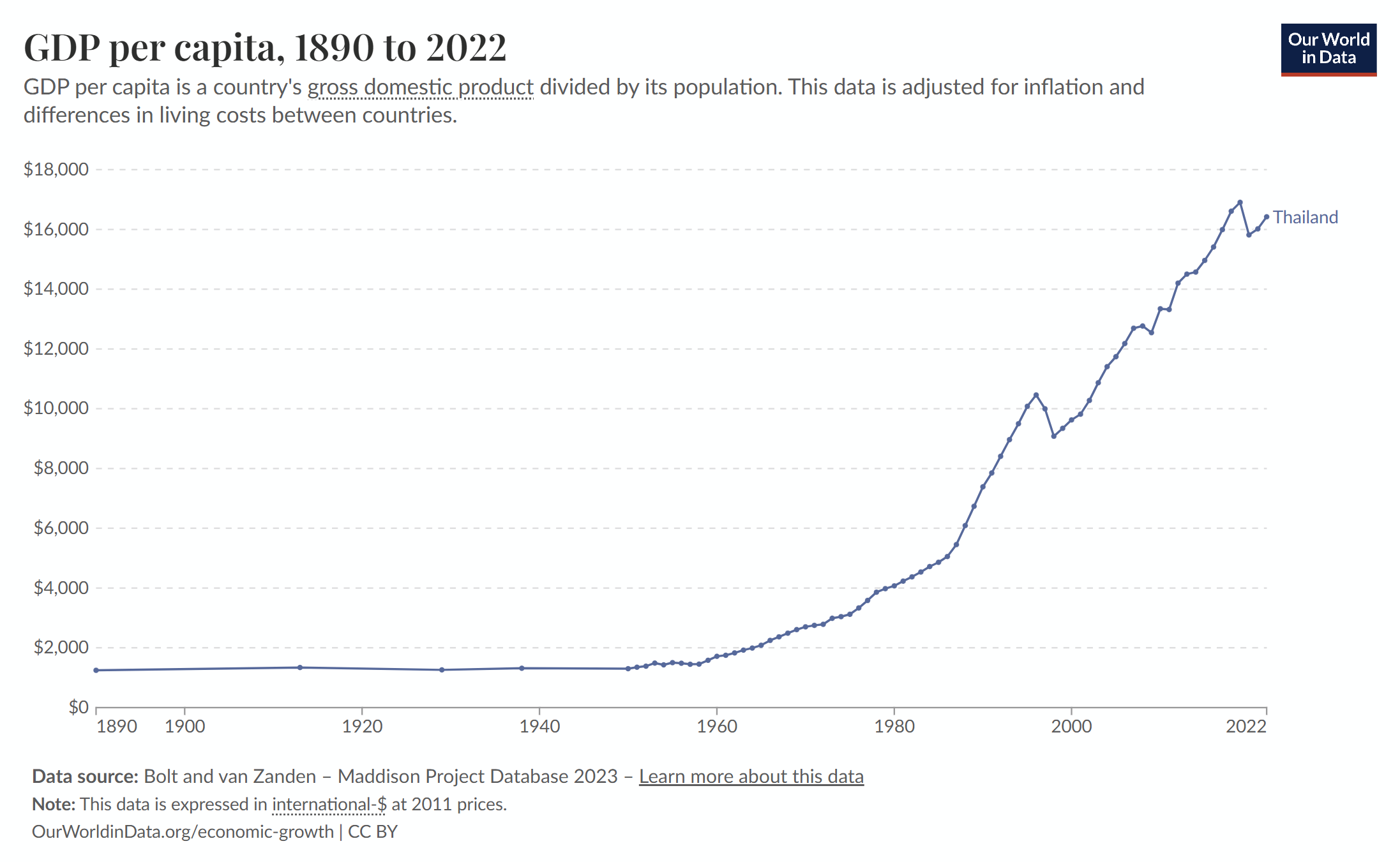
Development of real GDP per capita, 1890 to 2022

The median wealth per Thai adult was $1,469 in 2016, increasing from $605 in 2010. In 2016, Thailand was ranked 87th in the Human Development Index and 70th in the inequality-adjusted HDI.

In 2017, the median household income was ฿26,946 per month. The top quintile of households had a 45.0% share of all income, while the bottom quintile had 7.1%. An estimated 26.9 million people in the bottom 40% of the income bracket earned less than ฿5,344 per person per month. During the 2013–2014 Thai political crisis, a survey found that the largest portion of anti-government PDRC supporters (32%) had a monthly income of more than ฿50,000, while the largest portion of pro-government UDD supporters (27%) earned between ฿10,000 and ฿20,000.

In 2014, Credit Suisse reported that Thailand was the world's third-most unequal country, behind Russia and India. The wealthiest 10% held 79% of the country's assets. The top 1% held 58% of the assets. The 50 richest Thai families had a total net worth amounting to 30% of GDP. The Bank of Thailand reported that between 2006 and 2016, Thailand's largest 5% of companies accounted for 85% of all corporate revenue in the nation, and only 6% of the country's companies were in export industries, which made up 60% of the country's GDP.

In 2016, 5.81 million people lived in poverty, or 11.6 million people (17.2% of the population) if the "near poor" are included. The proportion of the poor relative to the total population in each region was 12.96% in the Northeast, 12.35% in the South, and 9.83% in the North. In 2017, 14 million people applied for social welfare (which required a yearly income of less than ฿100,000). In the first quarter of 2023, Thai household debt totalled 14.6 trillion baht or 89.2% of GDP; the average debt per household was approximately 500,000 baht. In 2016, there were an estimated 30,000 homeless people in the country.

=== Exports and manufacturing ===
In 2022, Thailand's exports of goods were worth roughly US$290 billion while its imports were worth roughly US$305 billion. Recovery from the 1997–1998 Asian financial crisis relied heavily on exports. As of 2025, the Thai automotive industry was the largest in Southeast Asia and the 12th-largest in the world. The Thai industry has an annual output of nearly 1.5 million vehicles, mostly commercial vehicles.

Most of the vehicles built in Thailand are developed and licensed by foreign producers, mainly Japanese and American. The car industry takes advantage of the ASEAN Free Trade Area (AFTA) to find a market for many of its products. Eight manufacturers—five Japanese, two American, and India's Tata—produce pick-up trucks in Thailand. As of 2012, due to its favourable taxation for 2-door pick-ups at only 3–12% against 17–50% for passenger cars, Thailand was the second-largest consumer of pick-up trucks in the world, after the US. In 2014, pick-ups accounted for 42% of all new vehicle sales in Thailand.

=== Tourism ===
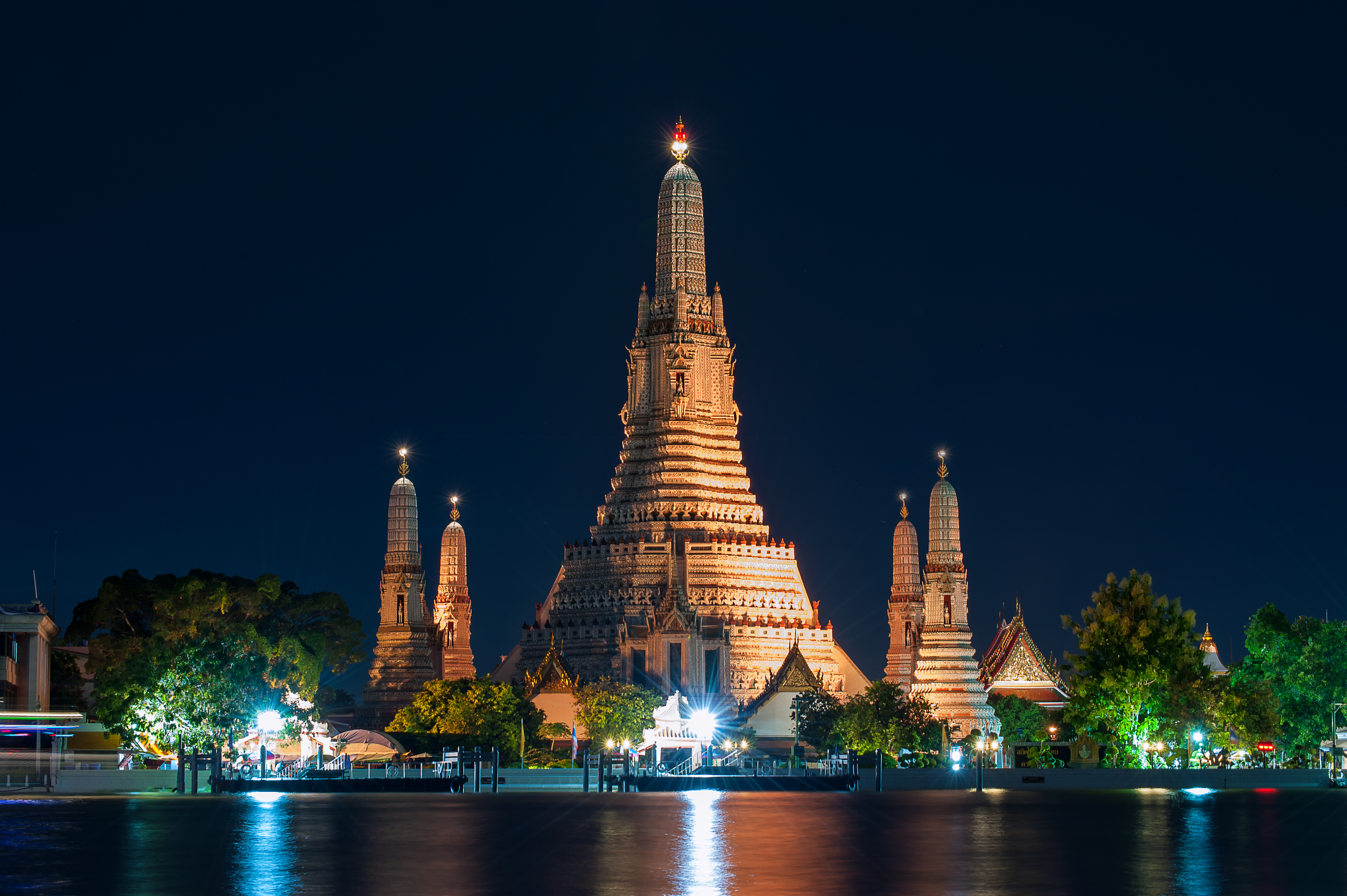
Wat Arun, Bangkok, is among the best-known Thailand's landmarks.

Tourism makes up about 6% of the economy. Prior to the pandemic, Thailand was the world's eighth-most visited country according to the World Tourism rankings compiled by the United Nations World Tourism Organisation. In 2019, Thailand received 39.8 million international tourists, ahead of the United Kingdom and Germany and ranked fourth globally in international tourism receipts, earning 60.5 billion US dollars.

Thailand was the most visited country in Southeast Asia in 2013, according to the World Tourism Organisation. Estimates of direct tourism receipts contributing to the Thai GDP of 12 trillion baht range from 9 per cent (1 trillion baht in 2013) to 16 per cent. When factoring in the indirect effects of tourism, the sector is estimated to account for 20.2 per cent (2.4 trillion baht) of Thailand's GDP.

Asian tourists primarily visit Thailand for Bangkok and the historical, natural, and cultural sights in its vicinity. Western tourists visit Bangkok and surrounding areas, as well as the southern beaches and islands. The north is the chief destination for trekking and adventure travel, offering diverse ethnic minority groups and forested mountains. The region hosting the fewest tourists is Isan.

Thailand ranks as the world's fifth-largest medical tourism destination in spending, according to the World Travel and Tourism Council, attracting over 2.5 million visitors in 2018, and is number one in Asia. The country is popular for the growing practice of sex reassignment surgery and cosmetic surgery. Prostitution in Thailand and sex tourism also form a de facto part of the economy. Campaigns promote Thailand as exotic to attract tourists. One estimate published in 2003 placed the trade at US$4.3 billion per year, or about 3% of the Thai economy. It is believed that at least 10% of tourist dollars are spent on the sex trade.

=== Agriculture and natural resources ===
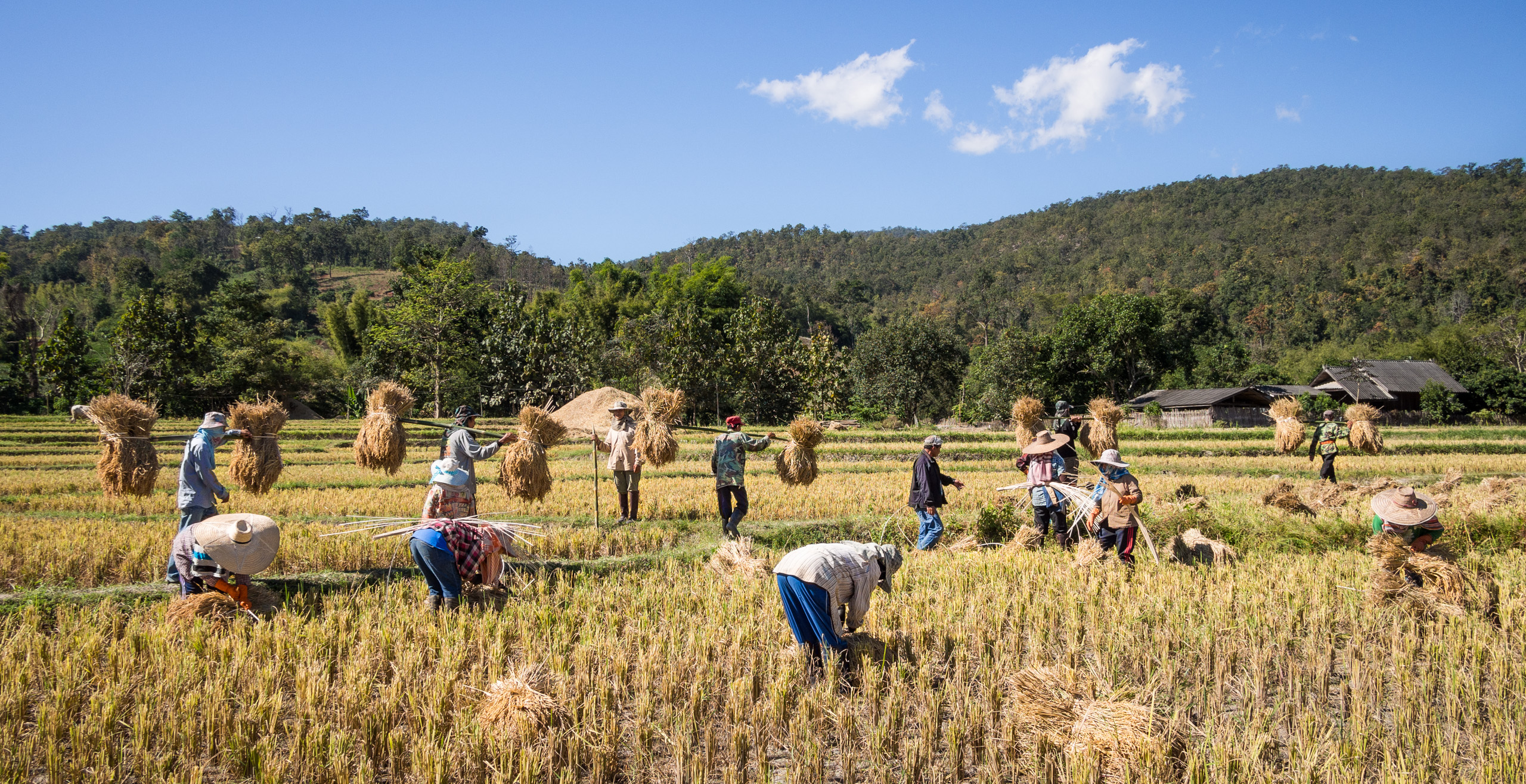
Thailand has long been one of the largest rice exporters in the world. Forty-nine per cent of Thailand's labour force is employed in agriculture, down from 70% in 1980.

Forty-nine per cent of the labour force is employed in agriculture, down from 70% in 1980. Rice is the most important crop, and Thailand had long been the world's leading exporter of rice, although it has recently fallen behind India and Vietnam. Thailand has the highest percentage of arable land, 27.25%, of any state in the Greater Mekong Subregion. About 55% of the arable land area is used for rice production.

Agriculture has been experiencing a transition from labour-intensive and traditional methods to a more industrialised and competitive sector. Between 1962 and 1983, the agricultural sector grew by 4.1% per year on average, and continued to grow at 2.2% between 1983 and 2007. The relative contribution of agriculture to GDP has declined, while exports of goods and services have increased.

Access to biocapacity is lower than the world average, with 1.2 global hectares of biocapacity per person, compared to the world average of 1.6. In 2016, Thailand used 2.5 global hectares—the ecological footprint of consumption. This means the country uses about twice as much biocapacity as it contains, resulting in a deficit.

=== Informal economy ===
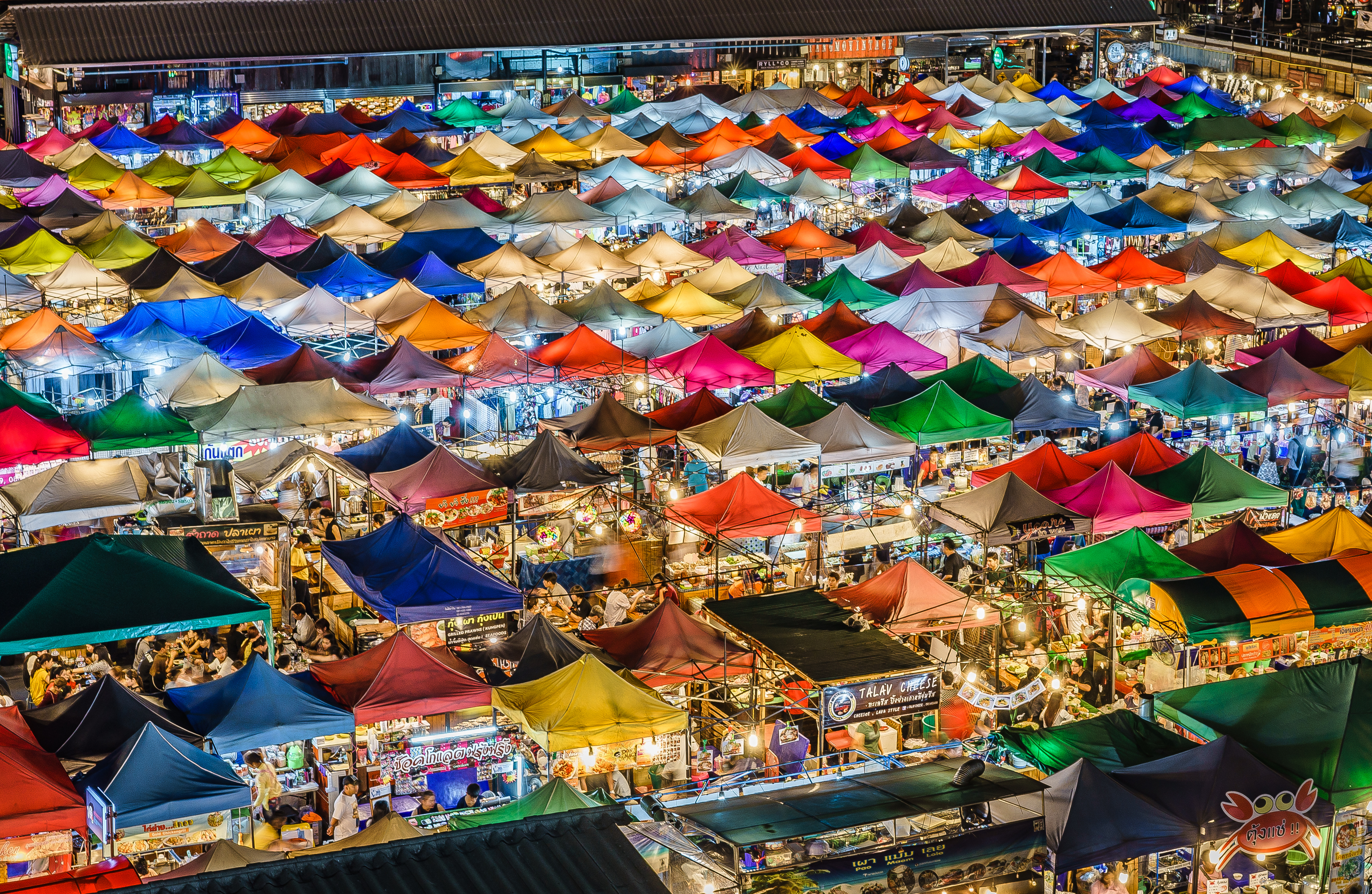
The Train Night Market in Bangkok

In 2012, it was estimated that informal workers comprised 62.6% of the workforce. The Ministry of Labour defines informal workers as individuals who work in the informal economy and lack employee status under the country's Labour Protection Act. The informal sector has grown significantly over the past 60 years during Thailand's gradual transition from an agricultural economy to a more industrialised and service-oriented one. Between 1993 and 1995, 10 per cent of the labour force moved from the agricultural sector to urban and industrial jobs, especially in the manufacturing sector. It is estimated that between 1988 and 1995, the number of factory workers doubled from two to four million, as the GDP tripled.

While the Asian financial crisis that followed in 1997 hit the economy hard, the industrial sector continued to expand under widespread deregulation, as Thailand was mandated to adopt a range of structural adjustment reforms upon receiving funding from the IMF and World Bank. These reforms implemented an agenda of increased privatisation and trade liberalisation, alongside decreased state subsidisation of public goods and utilities, agricultural price supports, and regulations on fair wages and labour conditions. Many migrant farmers took jobs in sweatshops and factories with few labour regulations and often exploitative conditions. Those who could not find formal factory work, including undocumented migrants and the families of rural Thai migrants, entered the informal sector shaped by these structural adjustment programmes. Scholars argue that the economic consequences and social costs of Thailand's labour reforms in the wake of the 1997 Asian financial crisis fell on individuals and families rather than the state.

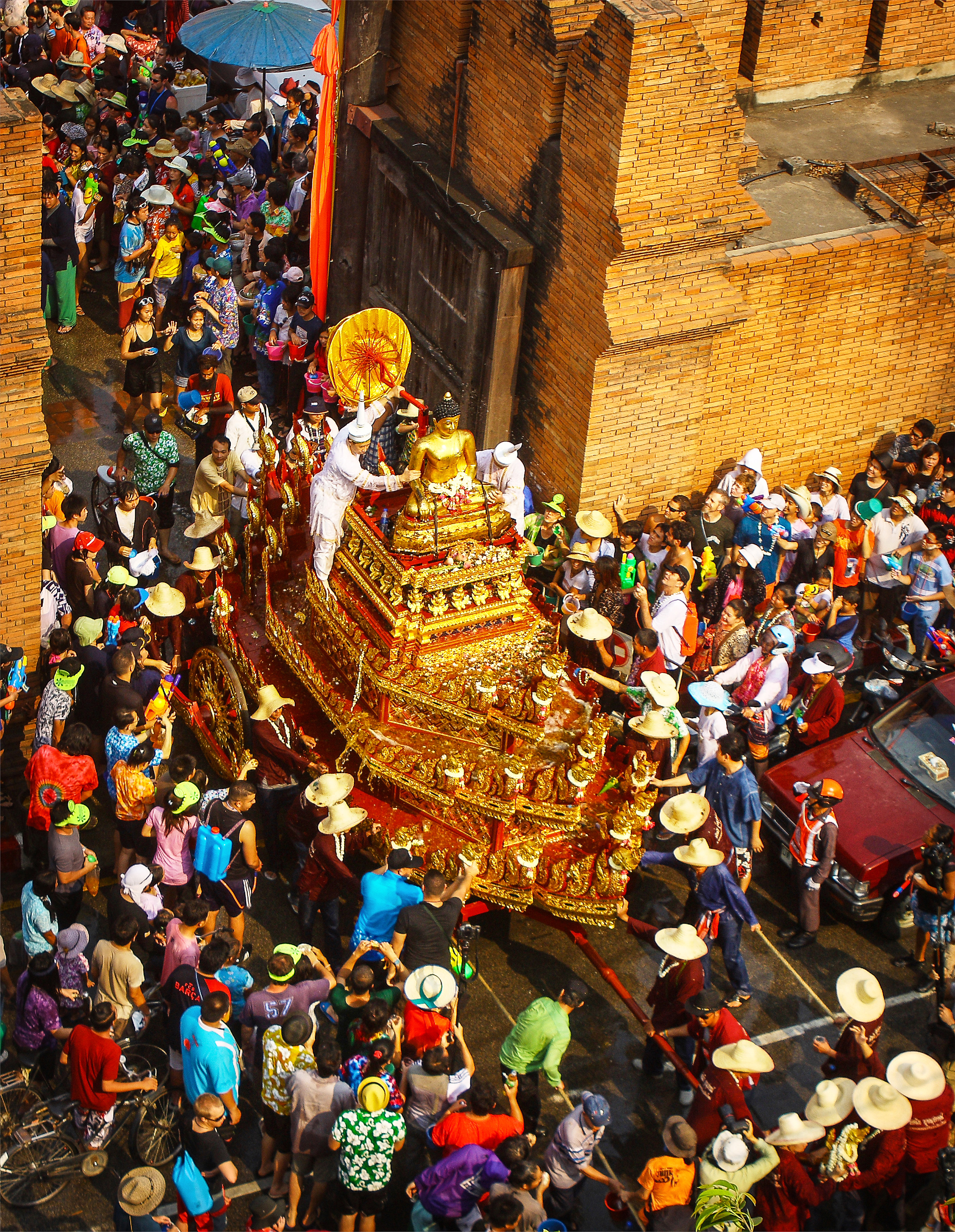
Songkran Festival, Chiang Mai's ancient city wall

Informal workers in entertainment, nightlife, and the sex industry face additional vulnerabilities, including recruitment into circles of sexual exploitation and human trafficking. A 2012 study found that 64% of informal workers had not completed education beyond primary school. Many informal workers are also migrants, only some of whom have legal status in the country. The informal labour sector is also not recognised under the Labour Protection Act. Social security policies fail to provide protection against workplace accidents, or offer unemployment and retirement insurance. Many informal workers are not legally contracted for their employment, and many do not make a living wage. Tens of thousands of migrants from neighbouring countries face exploitation in a few industries, especially in fishing, where slave-like conditions have been reported.

=== Science and technology ===
Thailand ranked 45th in the Global Innovation Index in 2025. The Ministry of Higher Education, Science, Research and Innovation and its agencies oversee the development of science, technology, and research. According to the National Research Council of Thailand, the country devoted 1.1% of its GDP to the research and development of science in 2019, with over 166,788 full-time equivalent research and development personnel that year.

== Infrastructure ==
=== Transportation ===
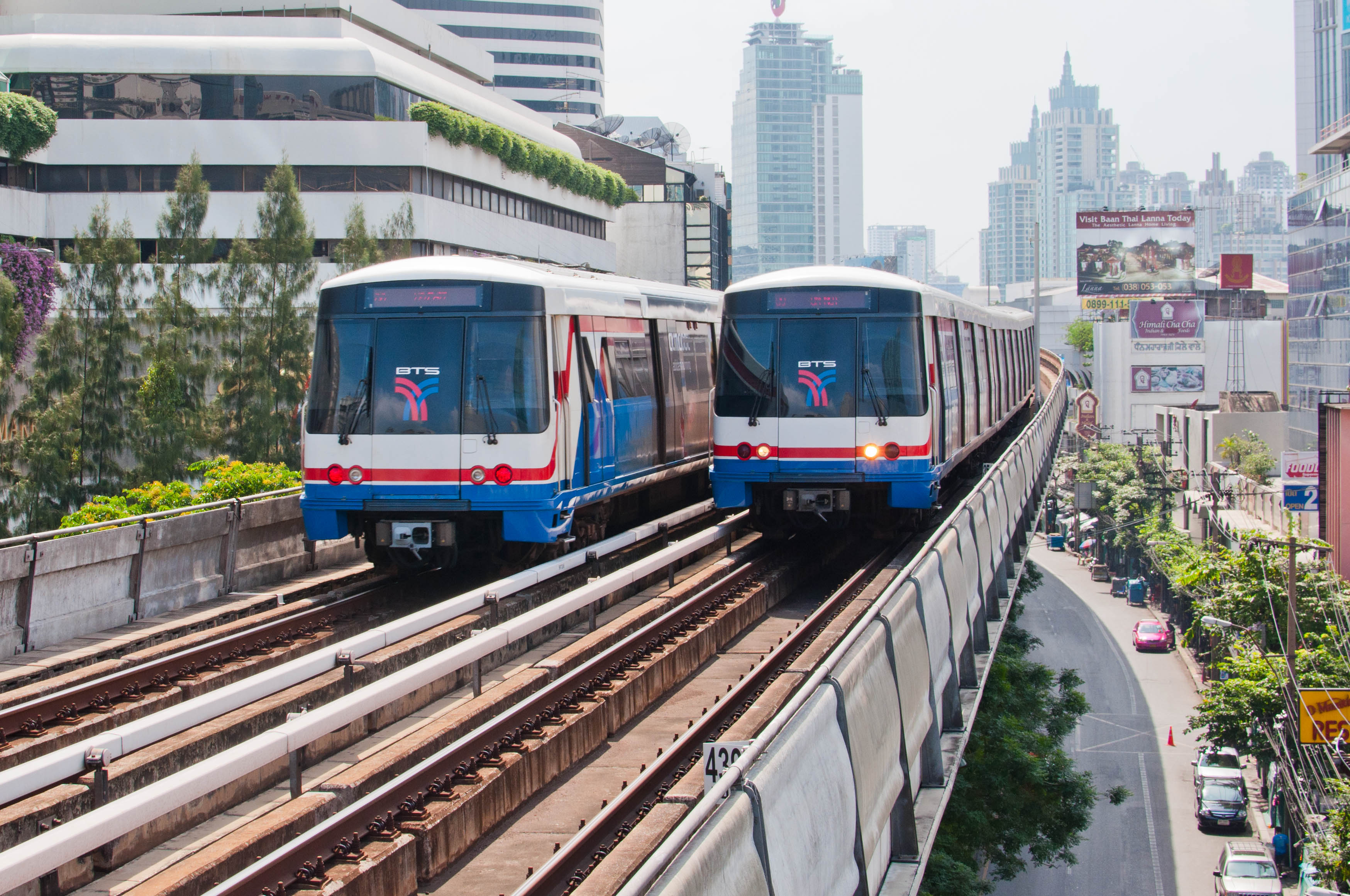
The BTS Skytrain is an elevated rapid transit system in Bangkok.

The State Railway of Thailand (SRT) operates all national rail lines. Krung Thep Aphiwat Central Terminal and Bangkok (Hua Lamphong) are the main termini for intercity routes, while Phahonyothin and the Lat Krabang Inland Container Depot (ICD) are the primary freight terminals. As of 2025, the SRT had 4,507 km (2,801 mi) of track, all of it metre gauge. Nearly all of it is single-track (2,702.1 km (1,679.0 mi)), although key sections around Bangkok are double-tracked (1,234.9 km (767.3 mi)) or triple-tracked (107 km (66 mi)), with expansion plans underway. Rail transport in Bangkok includes long-distance services as well as four rapid transit systems: the BTS Skytrain, MRT, SRT Red Lines, and Airport Rail Link.

Thailand has 390,000 kilometres (240,000 miles) of highways. As of 2017, there were over 462,133 km of roads and 37 million registered vehicles, 20 million of which were motorcycles. Many undivided two-lane highways have been converted into divided four-lane highways. Within the Bangkok Metropolitan Region, there are numerous controlled-access highways. In Bangkok alone, 4,125 public vans operate on 114 routes. Other forms of road transport include tuk-tuks, taxis (with over 80,647 registered nationwide as of 2018), passenger vans, motorcycle taxis, and songthaews.

As of 2012, Thailand had 103 airports with 63 paved runways, in addition to six heliports. The busiest airport is Bangkok's Suvarnabhumi Airport.

=== Energy ===
In 2014, natural gas generated 75% of Thailand's electricity. Coal-fired power plants produced an additional 20%, with the remainder coming from biomass, hydro, and biogas. Compared to other ASEAN countries, Thailand is the largest importer of gas by weight. In 2022, oil and gas production dropped by 19% and 17%, respectively. In 2018, the government introduced the Alternative Energy Development Plan 2018–2037 (AEDP 2018), which aims to increase renewable energy capacity to nearly 30,000 MW by 2037.

== Demographics ==
Ethnic groups of Thailand
(2015 estimate by The World Factbook)
1. Thai (97.5%)
2. Burmese (1.30%)
3. other (1.10%)
4. unspecified (0.10%)

Thailand had a population of 65.95 million in 2025. There were 64,953,661 Thai nationals and 997,549 non-Thai residents. Thailand's first census in 1909 found the population to be 8.2 million. The population is largely rural, concentrated in the rice-growing areas of the central, northeastern, and northern regions. About 44.2% of the population lived in urban areas as of 2010, a gradual increase from 29.4% in the 1990 census and 31.1% in the 2000 census.

The government-sponsored family planning programme resulted in a dramatic decline in population growth, from 3.1% in 1960 to around 0.4% today. In 1970, an average of 5.7 people lived in a Thai household; in 2022, the average household size was three people. Currently, more than 20% of the population is over 60. This aging demographic, combined with a low birth rate, poses economic challenges. The sex ratio of males to females is 1.05. The total fertility rate declined to 1.0 in 2024, placing Thailand among countries with ultra-low fertility rates.

=== Ethnic groups ===
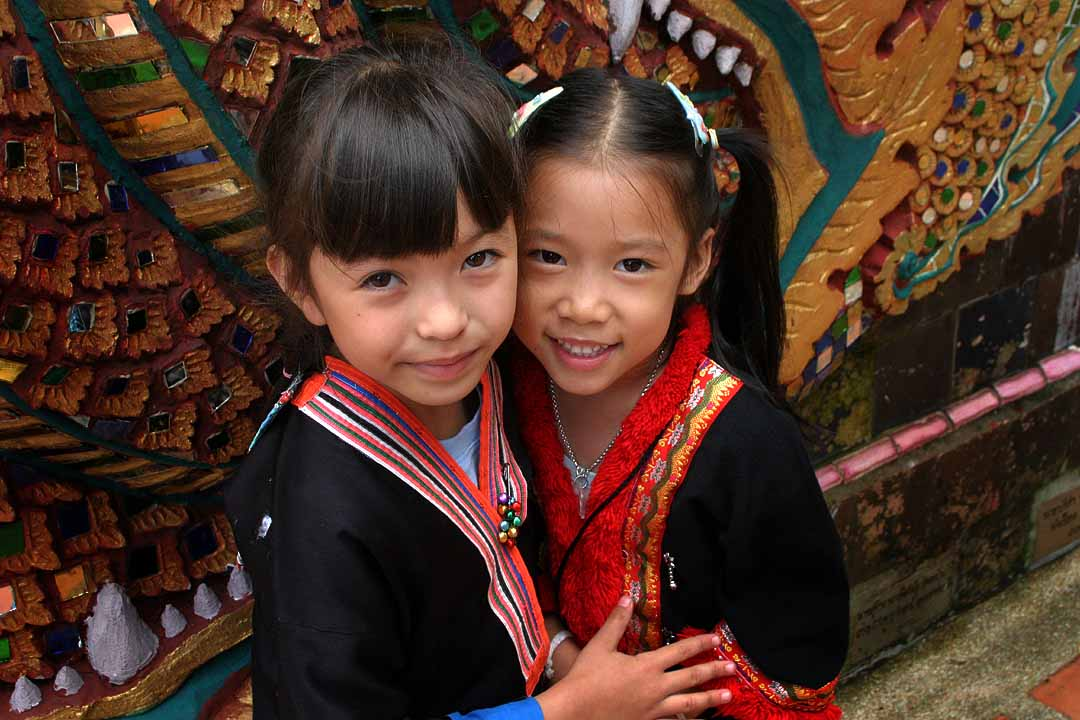
Hill tribes girls in the Northeast of Thailand

As of 2010, Thai nationals make up the majority of the population (95.9%). The remaining 4.1% of the population are Burmese (2.0%), others (1.3%), and unspecified (0.9%). According to genetic research, present-day Thai people are divided into three groups: the northern group (Khon Mueang) are closely related to the Tai ethnic groups in southern China, the northeastern group (Isan people) are mixed Tai and several Austroasiatic-speaking ethnic groups, while the central and southern groups (formerly called Siamese) strongly share genetic profiles with the Mon people.

According to the Royal Thai Government's 2011 Country Report to the UN Committee responsible for the International Convention for the Elimination of All Forms of Racial Discrimination, available from the Department of Rights and Liberties Promotion of the Thai Ministry of Justice, 62 ethnic communities are officially recognised in Thailand. Twenty million Central Thai (together with approximately 650,000 Khorat Thai) made up approximately 20,650,000 (34.1 per cent) of the state's population of 60,544,937 at the time of completion of the Mahidol University Ethnolinguistic Maps of Thailand data (1997).

The 2011 Thailand Country Report provides population numbers for mountain peoples ('hill tribes') and ethnic communities in the Northeast and is explicit about its main reliance on the Mahidol University Ethnolinguistic Maps of Thailand data. Thus, though over 3.288 million people in the Northeast alone could not be categorised, the population and percentages of other ethnic communities c. 1997 are known for all of Thailand and constitute minimum populations. In descending order, the largest (equal to or greater than 400,000) are a) 15,080,000 Lao (24.9 per cent) consisting of the Thai Lao (14 million) and other smaller Lao groups, namely the Thai Loei (400–500,000), Lao Lom (350,000), Lao Wiang/Klang (200,000), Lao Khrang (90,000), Lao Ngaew (30,000), and Lao Ti (10,000); b) six million Khon Muang (9.9 per cent, also called Northern Thais); c) 4.5 million Pak Tai (7.5 per cent, also called Southern Thais); d) 1.4 million Khmer Leu (2.3 per cent, also called Northern Khmer); e) 900,000 Malay (1.5%); f) 500,000 Nyaw (0.8 per cent); g) 470,000 Phu Thai (0.8 per cent); h) 400,000 Kuy/Kuay (also known as Suay) (0.7 per cent), and i) 350,000 Karen (0.6 per cent). Thai Chinese, including those of significant Chinese origins, represent 14% of the population, while Thais with partial Chinese ancestry comprise up to 40% of the population.

Increasing numbers of migrants from neighbouring Myanmar, Laos, and Cambodia, as well as from Nepal and India, have pushed the total number of non-national residents to around 3.5 million as of 2009, up from an estimated 2 million in 2008. Some 41,000 Britons and 20,000 Australians live in Thailand.

=== Population centres ===
Largest municipalities in Thailand รายงานสถิติจำนวนประชากรและบ้านประจำปี พ.ศ.2563. Archived from the original on 26 May 2021.
Rank	Name	Province	Pop.	Rank	Name	Province	Pop.
1	Bangkok	Bangkok	5,588,222	11	Khon Kaen City	Khon Kaen	110,615
2	Nonthaburi City	Nonthaburi	251,026	12	Nakhon Si Thammarat City	Nakhon Si Thammarat	100,416
3	Pak Kret City	Nonthaburi	189,458	13	Laem Chabang City	Chonburi	89,457
4	Hat Yai City	Songkhla	149,459	14	Rangsit City	Pathum Thani	84,268
5	Chaophraya Surasak City	Chonburi	146,474	15	Nakhon Sawan City	Nakhon Sawan	81,239
6	Surat Thani City	Surat Thani	131,599	16	Phuket City	Phuket	77,778
7	Nakhon Ratchasima City	Nakhon Ratchasima	122,730	17	Chiang Rai City	Chiang Rai	77,545
8	Chiang Mai City	Chiang Mai	122,627	18	Ubon Ratchathani City	Ubon Ratchathani	72,855
9	Udon Thani City	Udon Thani	120,202	19	Nakhon Pathom City	Nakhon Pathom	72,753
10	Pattaya City	Chonburi	117,606	20	Ko Samui City	Surat Thani	68,994

Largest cities by urban population in Thailand onedptgis.dpt.go.th/onedpt-complain-ppl/ www.bora.dopa.go.th
Rank	Name	Province	Pop.
1	Bangkok	Bangkok	10,539,000
2	Chiang Mai	Chiang Mai	1,198,000
3	Nakhon Ratchasima	Nakhon Ratchasima	466,098
4	Khon Kaen	Khon Kaen	412,758
5	Hat Yai	Songhkla	404,044
6	Udon Thani	Udon Thani	400,581
7	Chonburi	Chonburi	342,959
8	Pattaya	Chonburi	328,961
9	Si Racha	Chonburi	327,172
10	Phitsanulok	Phitsanulok	281,929

=== Language ===
An ethnolinguistic map of Thailand

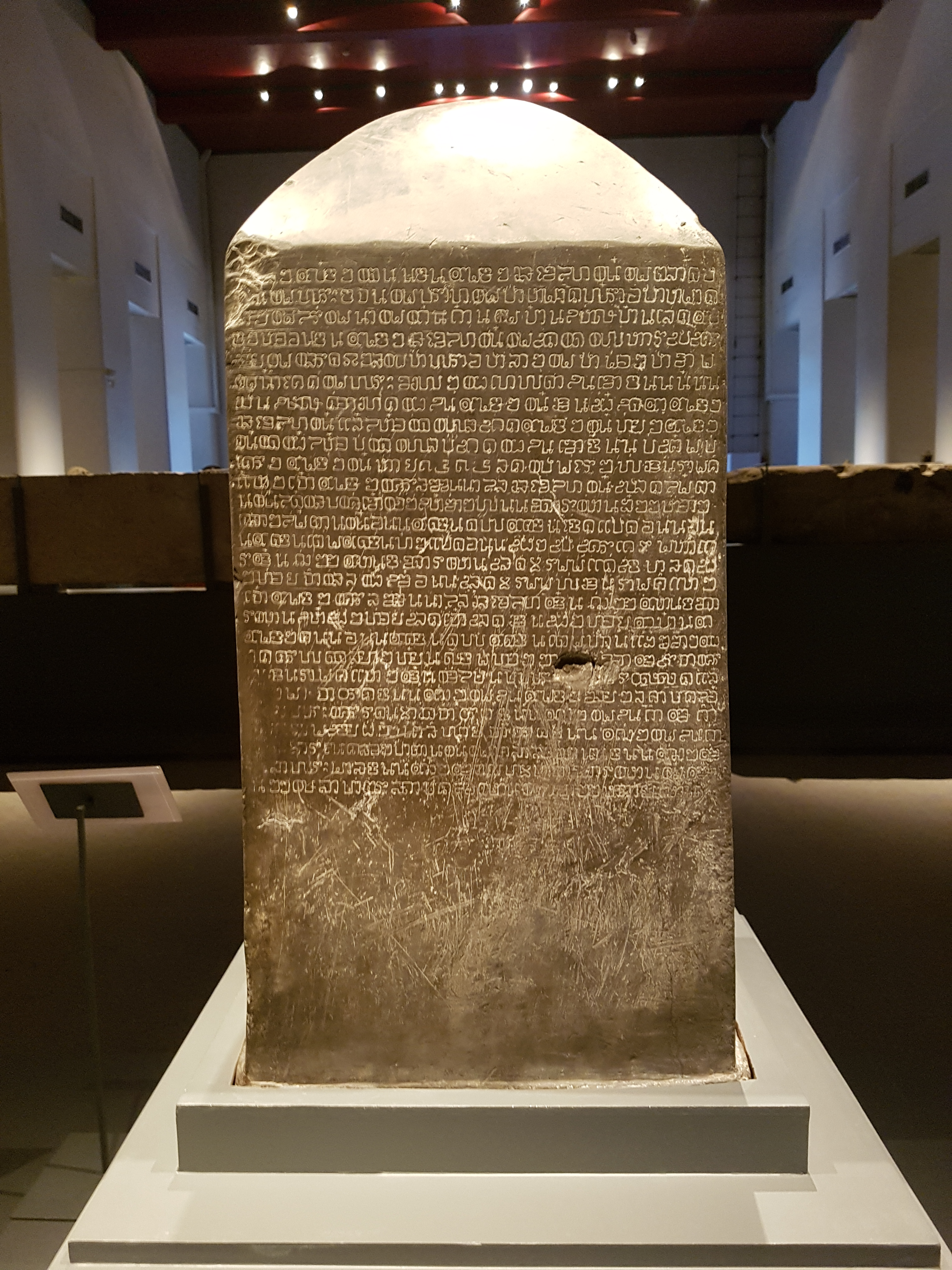
The Silajaruek of Sukhothai Kingdom are hundreds of stone inscriptions that form a historical record of the period.

Thai is the official language. It is a Kra–Dai language closely related to Lao, Shan in Myanmar, and numerous smaller languages spoken in an arc from Hainan and Yunnan south to the Chinese border. It is the principal language of education and government and is spoken throughout the country. The standard is based on the dialect of the central Thai people, and it is written in the Thai alphabet, an abugida script that evolved from the Khmer alphabet.

Sixty-two languages are recognised by the Royal Thai Government. For the purposes of the national census, four dialects of Thai exist; these partly coincide with regional designations, such as Southern Thai and Northern Thai.

The largest of Thailand's minority languages is the Lao dialect of Isan spoken in the northeastern provinces. In the far south, Kelantan-Pattani Malay is the primary language of Malay Muslims. Varieties of Chinese are also spoken by the large Thai Chinese population, with the Teochew dialect best-represented. Numerous tribal languages are also spoken, including many Austroasiatic languages such as Mon, Khmer, Lawa and Mlabri; Austronesian languages such as Cham, Moken and Urak Lawoi'; Sino-Tibetan languages like Akha and Karen; and other Tai languages such as Phu Thai, and Saek. Hmong is a member of the Hmong–Mien languages, which is now regarded as a language family of its own.

=== Religion ===
Religion in Thailand (2018)
1. Buddhism (93.5%)
2. Islam (5.37%)
3. Christianity (1.13%)
4. Other (0.04%)

The country's most prevalent religion is Theravada Buddhism, which is an integral part of Thai identity and culture. Active participation in Buddhism is among the highest in the world. Thailand has the second-largest number of Buddhists in the world after China. According to the 2018 National Statistical Office data, 93.46% of the country's population self-identified as Buddhists.

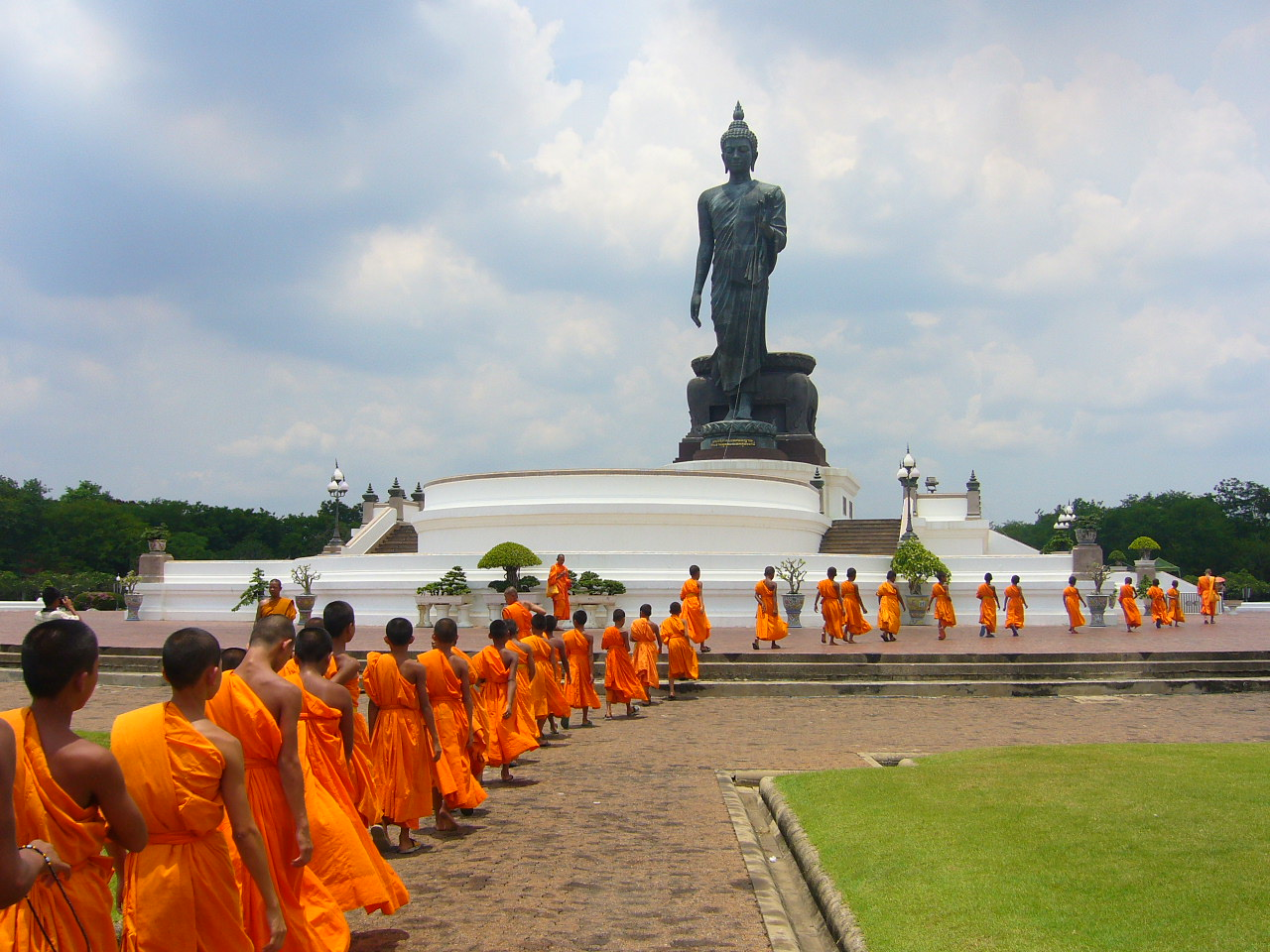
Samanera of Theravada Buddhism, the most practised religion in Thailand

Muslims constitute the second largest religious group in Thailand, comprising 5.37% of the population in 2018. Islam is concentrated mostly in the country's southernmost provinces: Pattani, Yala, Satun, Narathiwat, and part of Songkhla, which are predominantly Malay, most of whom are Sunni Muslims. Christians represented 1.13% of the population in 2018, with the remaining population consisting of Hindus and Sikhs, who live mostly in the country's cities. There is also a small Jewish community in Thailand dating back to the 17th century.

The constitution does not name an official state religion and provides for freedom of religion. There have been no widespread reports of societal abuses or discrimination based on religious belief or practice. Thai law officially recognises five religious groups: Buddhists, Muslims, Brahmin-Hindus, Sikhs, and Christians. However, some laws are inspired by Buddhist practices, such as banning alcohol sales on religious holidays.

=== Education ===
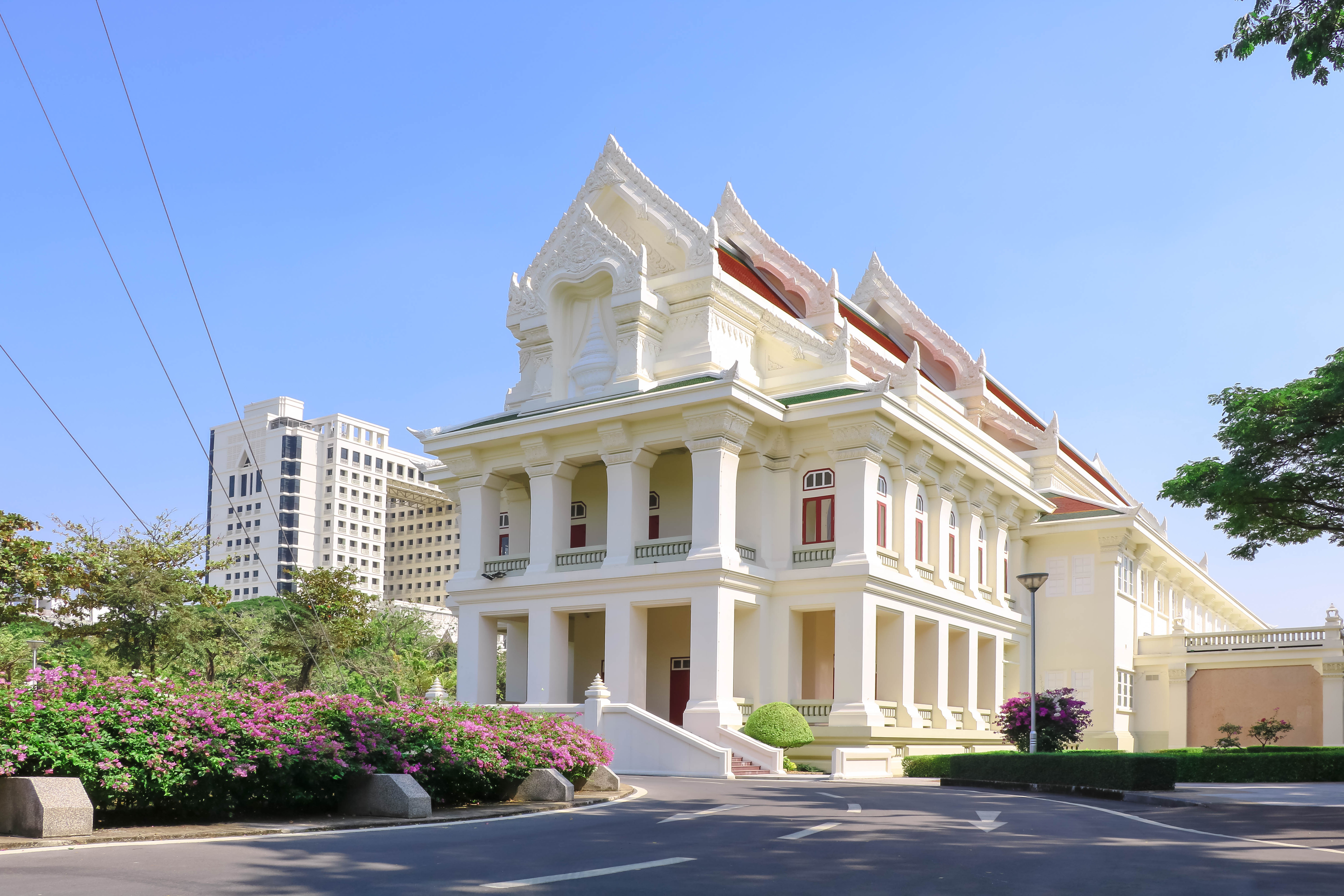
Chulalongkorn University, established in 1917, is the oldest university in Thailand.

In 1995, as minister of education, Sukavich Rangsitpol laid out his plans for educational reform in Thailand. The reform was considered a landmark movement after nearly 100 years of education under the previous system. Thailand's youth literacy rate was 98.1% in 2015. Education is provided by a school system of kindergartens, primary, lower secondary and upper secondary schools, numerous vocational colleges, and universities. Education is compulsory up to and including age 14, while the government is mandated to provide free education through to age 17. Issues concerning university entrance have been in constant upheaval for a number of years. The country is also one of the few that mandates uniforms through the university level, a policy that remains a subject of ongoing debate.

In 2013, the Ministry of Information and Communication Technology announced that 27,231 schools would receive classroom-level access to high-speed internet. However, the country's educational infrastructure was still underprepared for online teaching, as smaller and more remote schools were particularly hindered by COVID-19 restrictions.

The number of higher education institutions in Thailand has officially grown to 156 over the past decades. The two top-ranking universities in Thailand are Chulalongkorn University and Mahidol University. Thai universities' research output is still relatively low, even though the country's journal publications increased by 20% between 2011 and 2016. Thailand has the second highest number of English-medium private international schools in Southeast Asian Nations. Cram schools are especially popular for university entrance exams.

Students in ethnic minority areas score consistently lower in standardised national and international tests. This is likely due to an unequal allocation of educational resources, weak teacher training, poverty, and low skill in the Thai language, which is the language of the tests. As of 2020, Thailand was ranked 89th out of 100 countries globally for English proficiency. Thailand is the third most popular study destination in ASEAN. The number of international degree students in Thailand increased by 9.7 times between 1999 and 2012, from 1,882 to 20,309 students. Most international students come from neighbouring countries like China, Myanmar, Cambodia and Vietnam.

=== Health ===
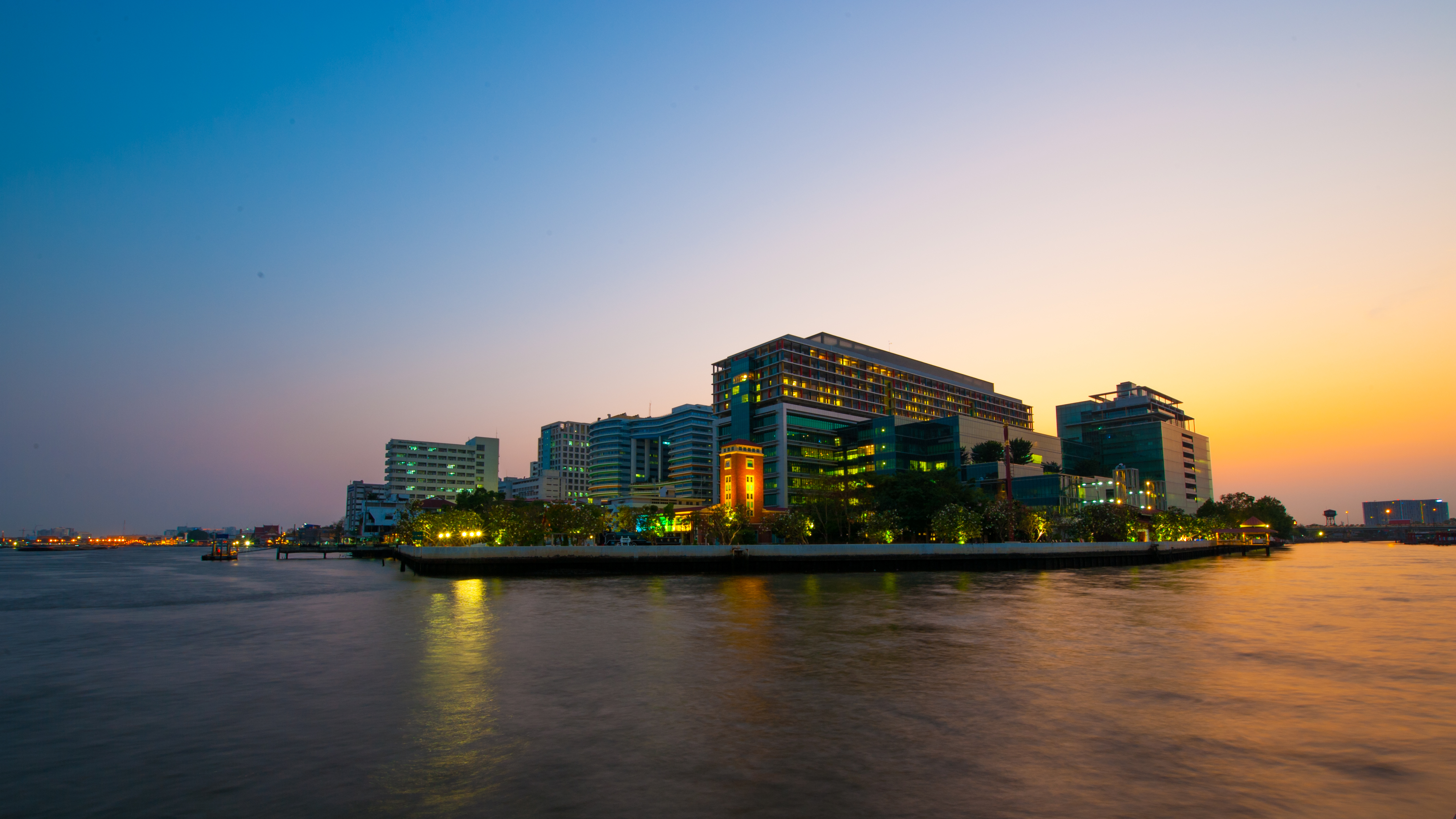
Siriraj Hospital in Bangkok, the oldest and largest hospital in Thailand

Thailand ranked sixth in the world and first in Asia in the 2019 Global Health Security Index of global health security capabilities across 195 countries, making it the only developing country in the global top ten. Thailand had 62 hospitals accredited by Joint Commission International. In 2002, Bumrungrad became the first hospital in Asia to meet the standard.

Health and medical care is overseen by the Ministry of Public Health, with national expenditures on health amounting to 4.3 per cent of GDP in 2009. Non-communicable diseases form the major burden of morbidity and mortality, while infectious diseases including malaria and tuberculosis, as well as traffic accidents, are also important public health issues.

In 2018, the interim parliament voted to legalise the use of cannabis for medical reasons, making Thailand the first Southeast Asian country to allow the use of medical cannabis.

== Culture ==
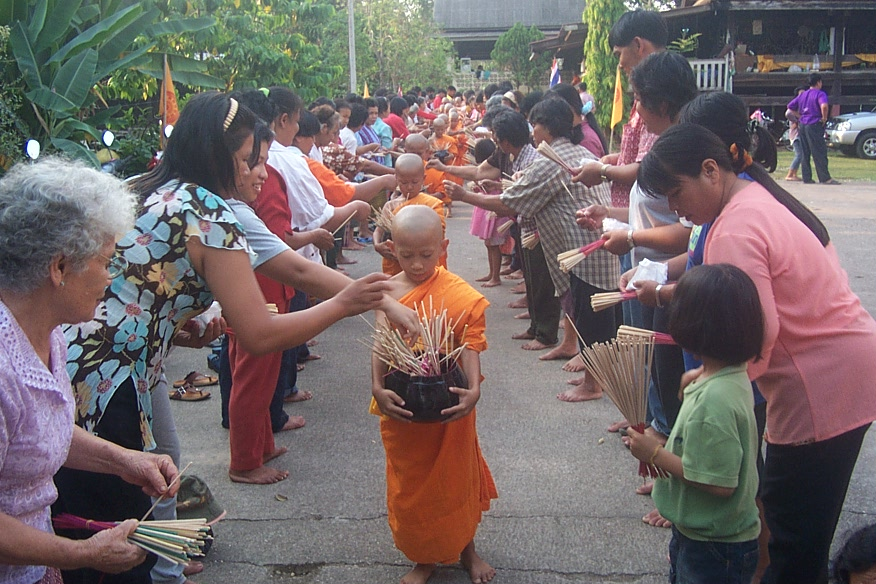
Buddhist novices receiving joss sticks.

Thai culture and traditions incorporate influences from India, China, Cambodia, and the rest of Southeast Asia. Thailand's national religion, Theravada Buddhism, is central to modern Thai identity. Thai Buddhism has evolved over millennia from the Mon kingdom of Dvaravati, and today incorporates regional beliefs rooted in Hinduism, animism, and ancestor worship. The official calendar is based on the Eastern version of the Buddhist Era (BE).

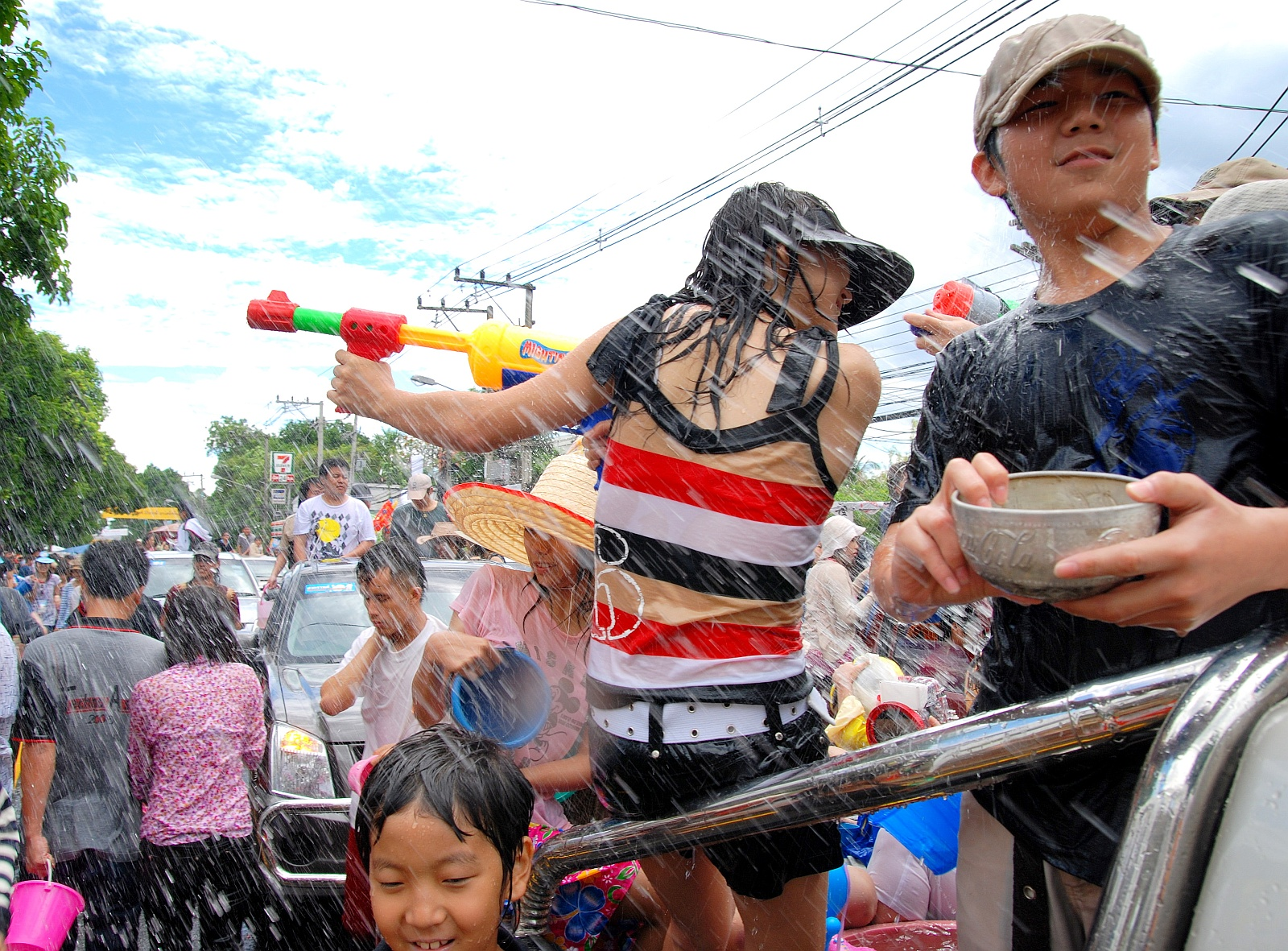
The roads along the old moat of Chiang Mai are full of vehicles during the Songkran water splashing festival.

The ancient Thai identity originates from Tai-speaking groups who migrated from southern China to Southeast Asia between the 6th and 11th centuries. They intermingled with existing Austroasiatic groups, such as the Mon and Khmer, absorbing their cultures and beliefs. King Ramkhamhaeng's reign (1279–1298) marked the inception of a unified Thai identity. Central Thailand's prevalent culture formed the basis of the modern Thai identity, which the Phibun regime subsequently promoted nationwide during the 1940s through cultural mandates.

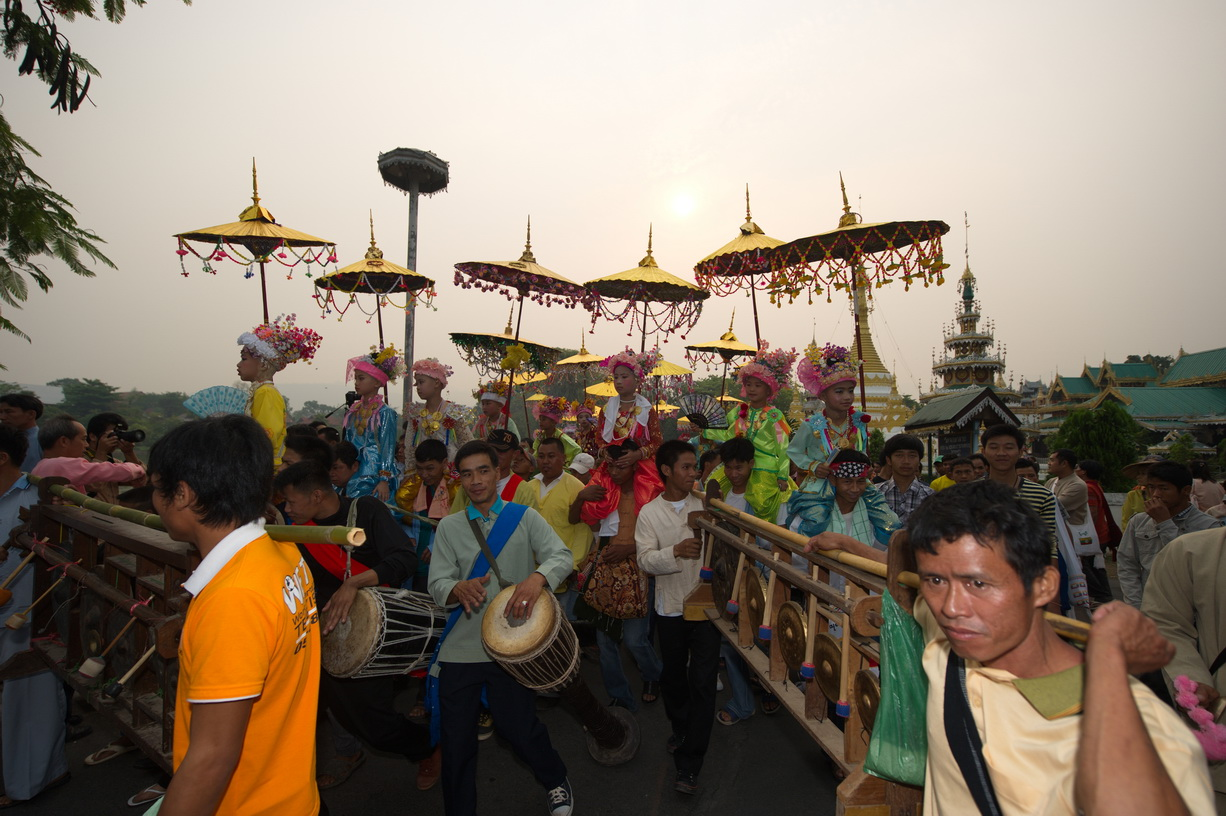
Poy Sang Long in Mae Hong Son, northern Thailand

Overseas Chinese form a significant part of Thai society, particularly in and around Bangkok, with Thai Chinese businesses prospering as part of the larger bamboo network.

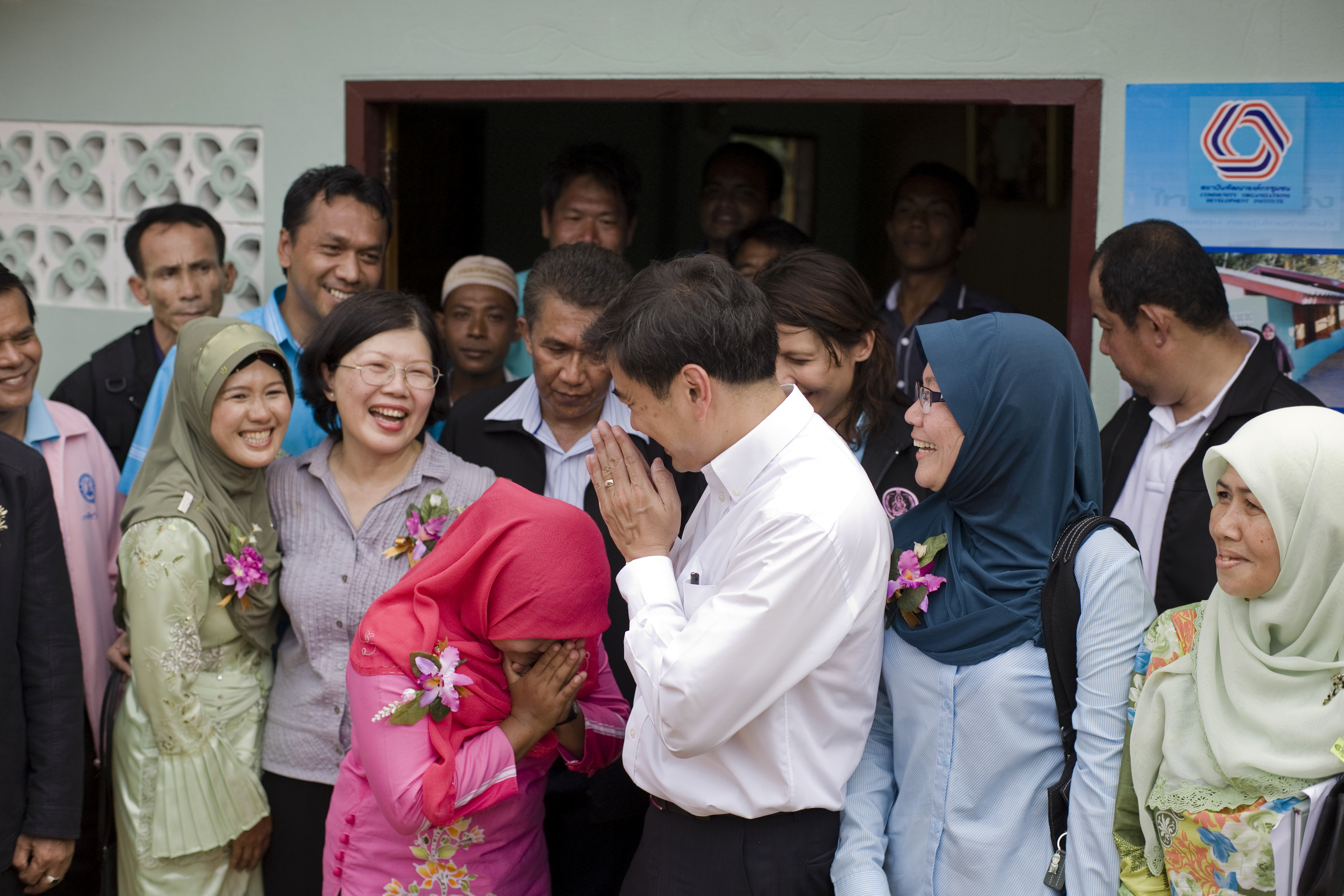
Thai greeting, the smile is an important symbol of refinement in Thai culture.

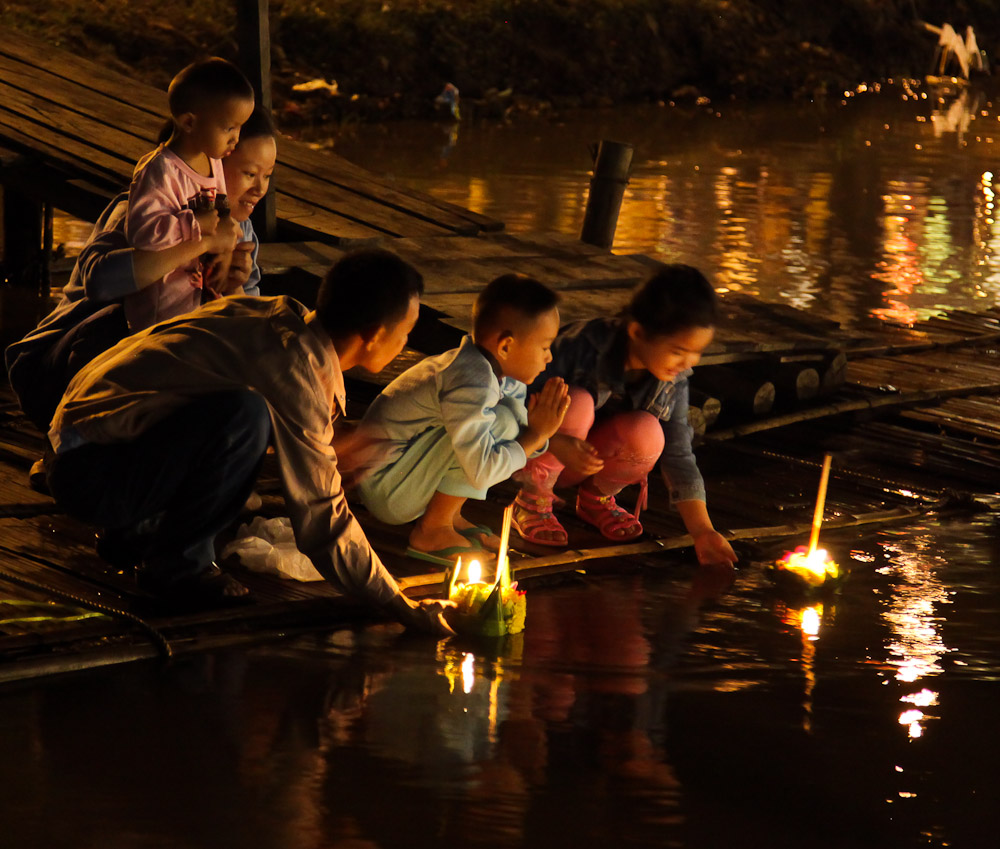
People floating krathong rafts during the Loi Krathong festival in Chiang Mai, Thailand

Respect for the elderly and superiors is a fundamental Thai custom, reflected in the Thai language's complex classes of honorifics. The wai is a standard greeting generally offered first by a person who is younger or lower in social status. Older siblings also have defined duties toward younger ones. Social taboos include touching someone's head or pointing with the feet, as the head is considered the most sacred part of the body and the foot the lowest.

=== Art ===
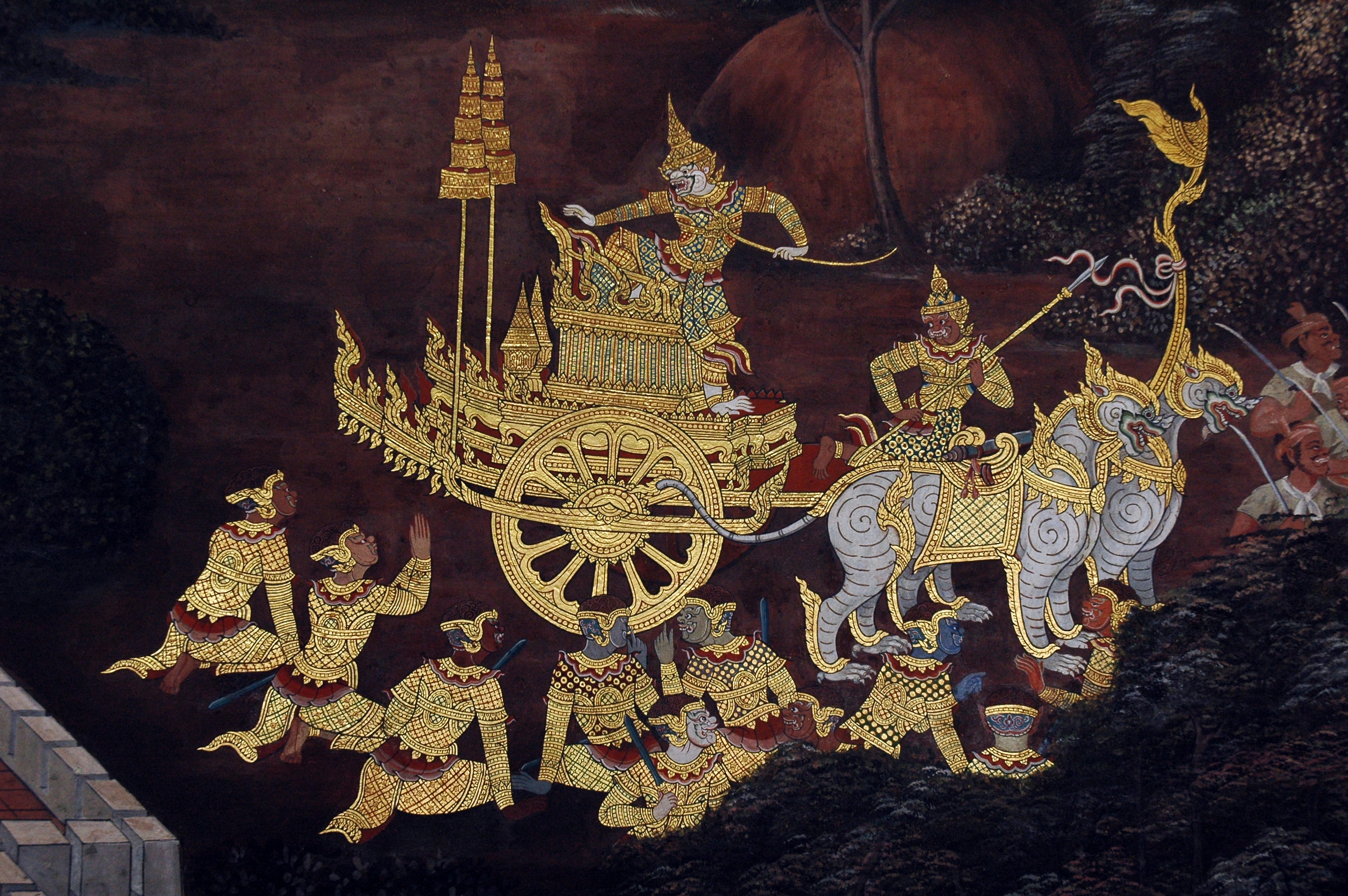
Scene from the Ramakien depicted on a mural at Wat Phra Kaew

Thai art heavily relies on Buddhist art and Indian epics, with traditional sculpture almost exclusively depicting the Buddha. Traditional paintings primarily function as book illustrations or ornamentation for palaces and temples. Originating from indigenous Mon and Khmer influences, Thai art developed its own unique style by the Sukhothai and Ayutthaya periods, later integrating Sri Lankan and Chinese elements.

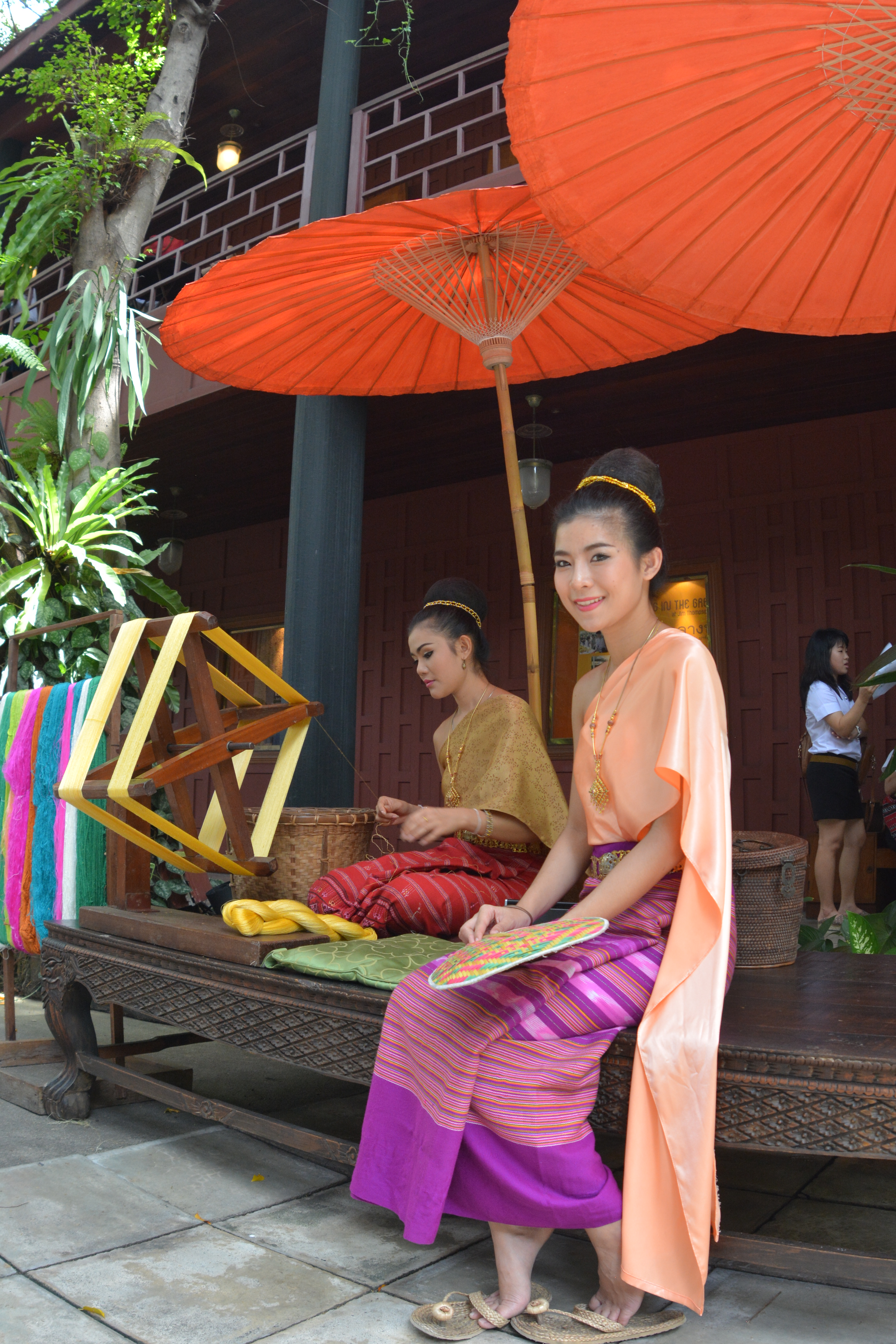
Thai women wearing sabai, Jim Thompson House

Traditional Thai painting lacks linear perspective, instead sizing elements based on their degree of importance. Composition relied on apportioning areas with "space transformers" to isolate main elements. Perspective was only introduced in the mid-19th century through Western influence, spearheaded by the monk-artist Khrua In Khong. Popular narrative subjects include Jataka stories, the Buddha's life, Buddhist cosmology, Thai versions of the Ramayana and Mahabharata, and Thai folklore.

=== Architecture ===
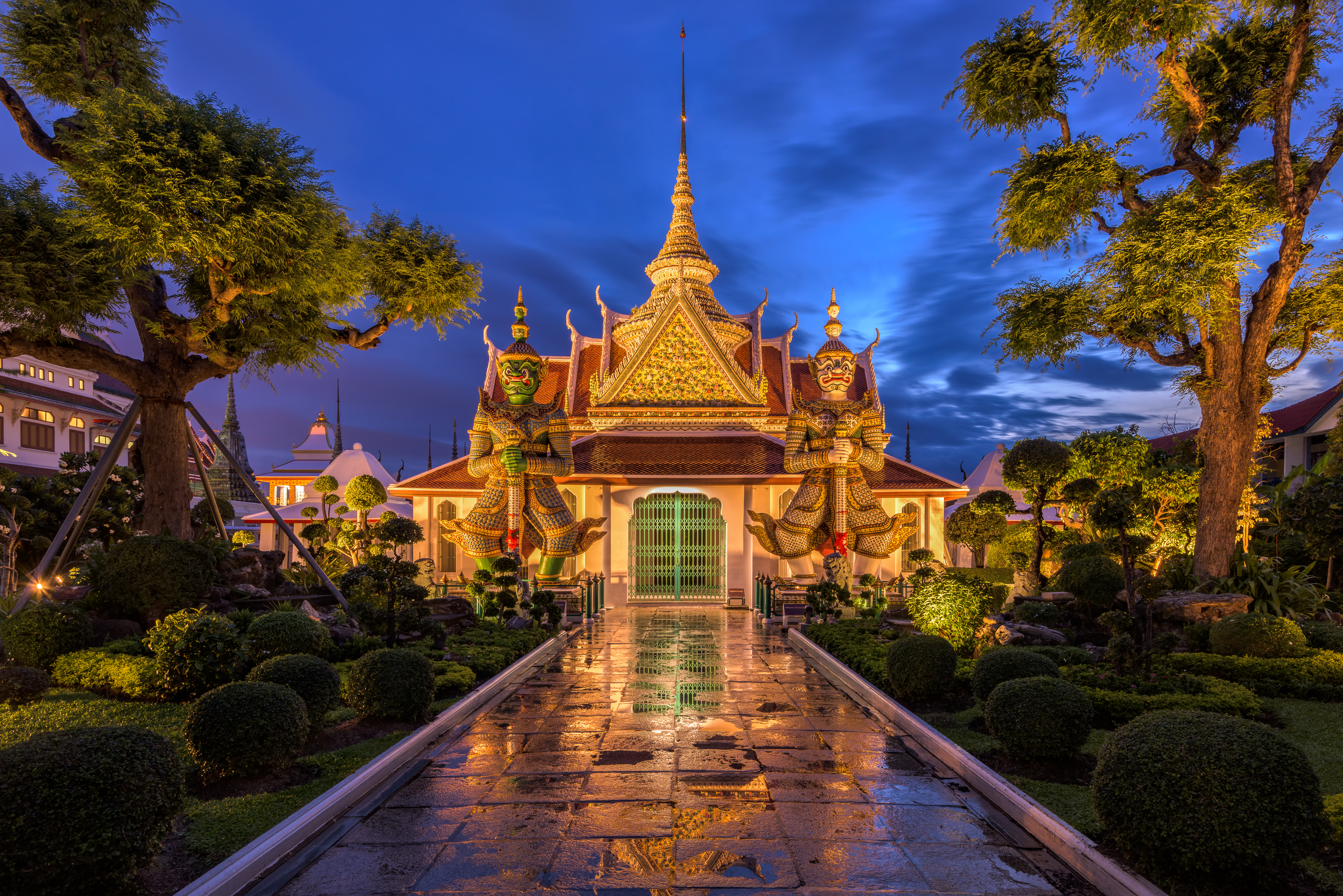
Two sculptures guarding the eastern gate of the main chapel at Wat Arun

Buddhist temples in Thailand are known as "wats", derived from the Pāḷi word vāṭa (enclosure), referencing the walls that separate the sacred space from the secular world. While wats display diverse regional layouts, they generally adhere to the same structural principles. Ayutthaya Kingdom architecture, designed to display might and riches, notably featured temples with steep roofs and elaborate eaves stretching from the masterhead.

=== Literature ===
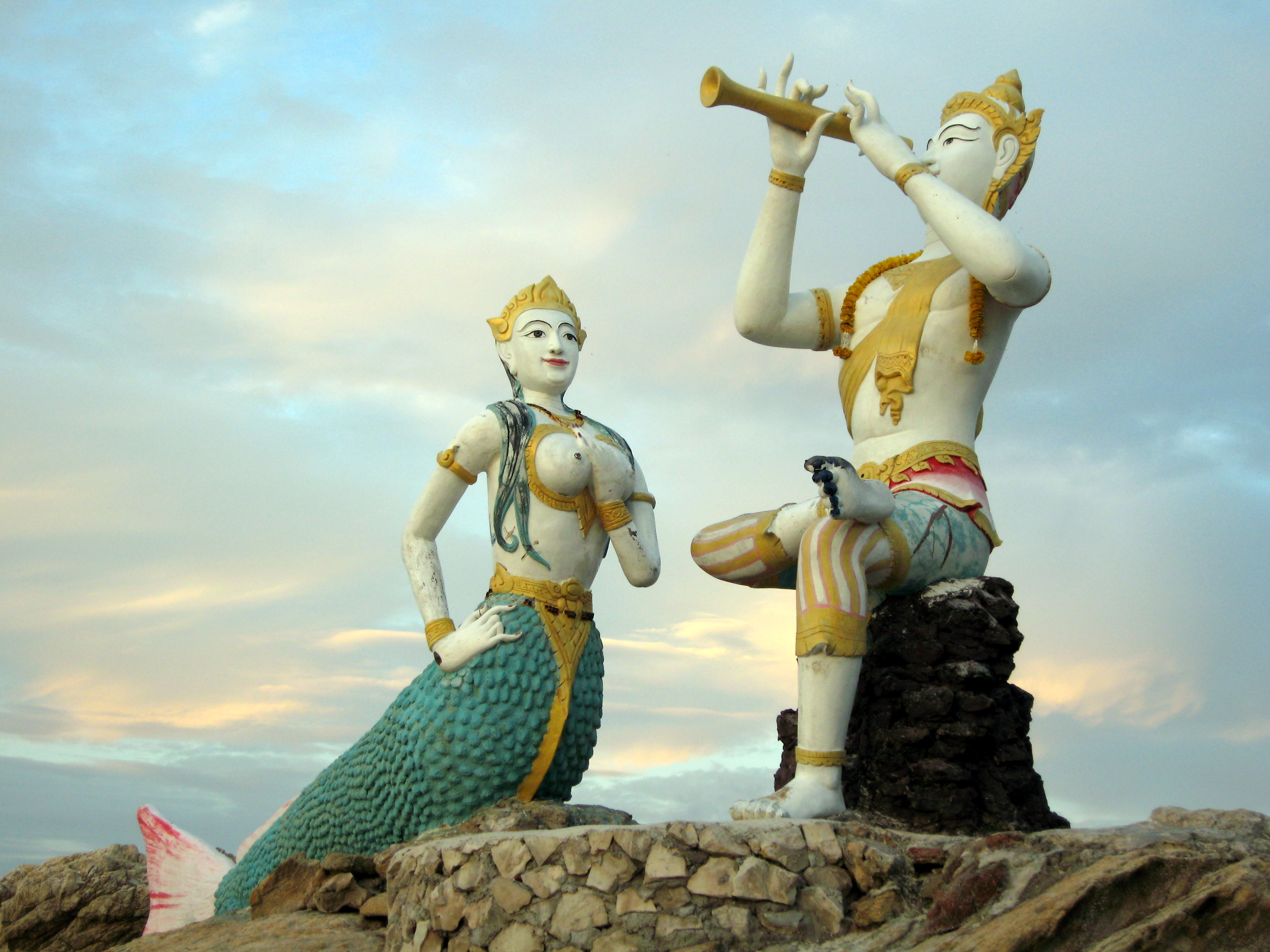
Sculptures of Phra Aphai Mani and the Mermaid from the epic poem Phra Aphai Mani, a work of Sunthorn Phu

Early Thai literature from the Sukhothai period was written in simple prose with basic alliteration. The Ram Khamhaeng Inscription is often considered the first Thai literary work, though its authenticity remains debated. King Maha Thammaracha I's Trai Phum Phra Ruang (1345) expounds on Buddhist philosophy and is considered one of the nation's earliest theological treatises.

The Ayutthaya period introduced new poetic forms, metres, and rhyme schemes, often combining them within a single work. Notable pieces include the narrative poem Lilit Yuan Phai and Prince Thammathibet's Kap He Ruea, sung during royal barge processions. The Thonburi period produced the Ramakien, a verse drama contributed to by King Taksin.

Rattanakosin-era literature often dealt with war and military strategy, reflecting ongoing conflicts with Burma. This era is heavily defined by the poet Sunthorn Phu, the "bard of Rattanakosin," whose masterpiece Phra Aphai Mani popularised the fantasy-adventure epic in Thai literature. Modern literary figures include Kukrit Pramoj, Kulap Saipradit, Chart Korbjitti, and Duanwad Pimwana.

=== Music and dance ===
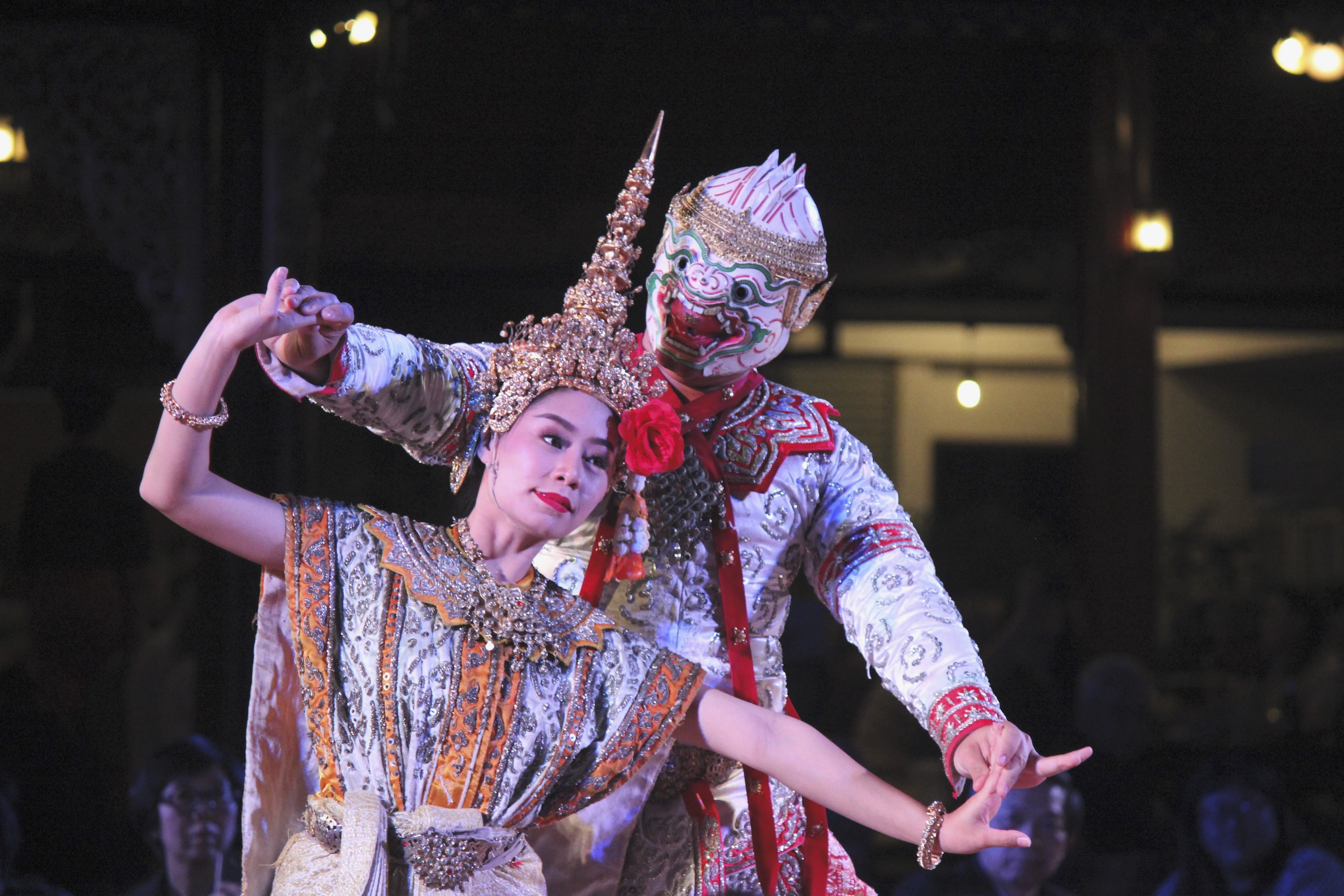
Khon show

Alongside folk dances like the southern Menora and central Ramwong, Thailand's two major forms of classical dance drama are Khon and Lakhon nai. Originally exclusive to the royal courts, they eventually influenced likay, a popular dance theatre style for commoners. Ritual dances such as the ram muay and wai khru are traditionally performed before muay Thai matches as an homage to teachers. Classical Thai music is primarily performed by three ensemble types: the Piphat, Khrueang sai, and Mahori.

=== Media ===
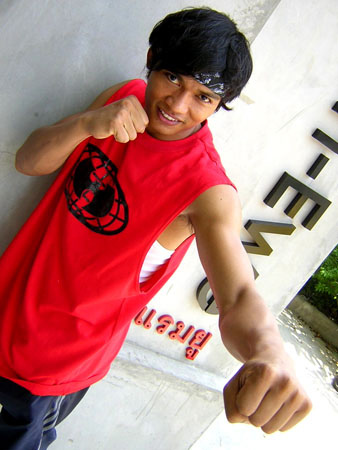
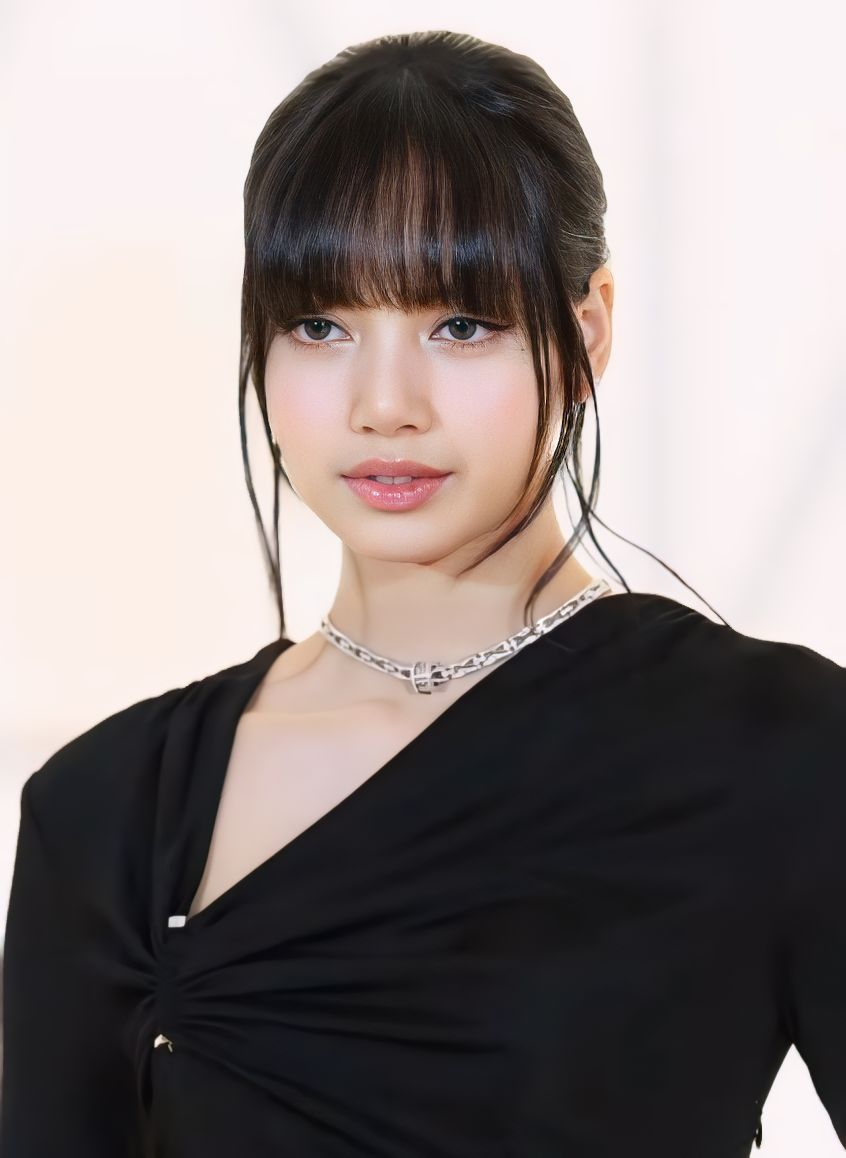
Tony Jaa and Lalisa Manobal (Note: Lisa spells her surname Manobal in the Latin alphabet. However, Manoban is a better approximation of the Thai pronunciation and is the spelling recommended by the Royal Thai General System of Transcription.)

Thai films and television dramas (lakorn) have developed a strong regional and international presence. Notable cinematic exports include the critically acclaimed horror film Shutter (2004), the martial arts hits Ong-Bak: Muay Thai Warrior (2003) and Tom-Yum-Goong (2005) starring Tony Jaa, and the thriller Bad Genius (2017), which broke box office records across Asia. Economically, the entertainment industry is a major contributor to Thailand's GDP, generating billions in direct revenue and supporting tens of thousands of jobs. Thailand has also produced internationally successful K-pop artist Lisa, as well as T-pop artists such as Violette Wautier, Jeff Satur, and Tata Young, alongside hip-hop artists Illslick and F.Hero, and rock bands such as Loso, Bodyslam, Silly Fools, and Carabao.

=== Cuisine ===
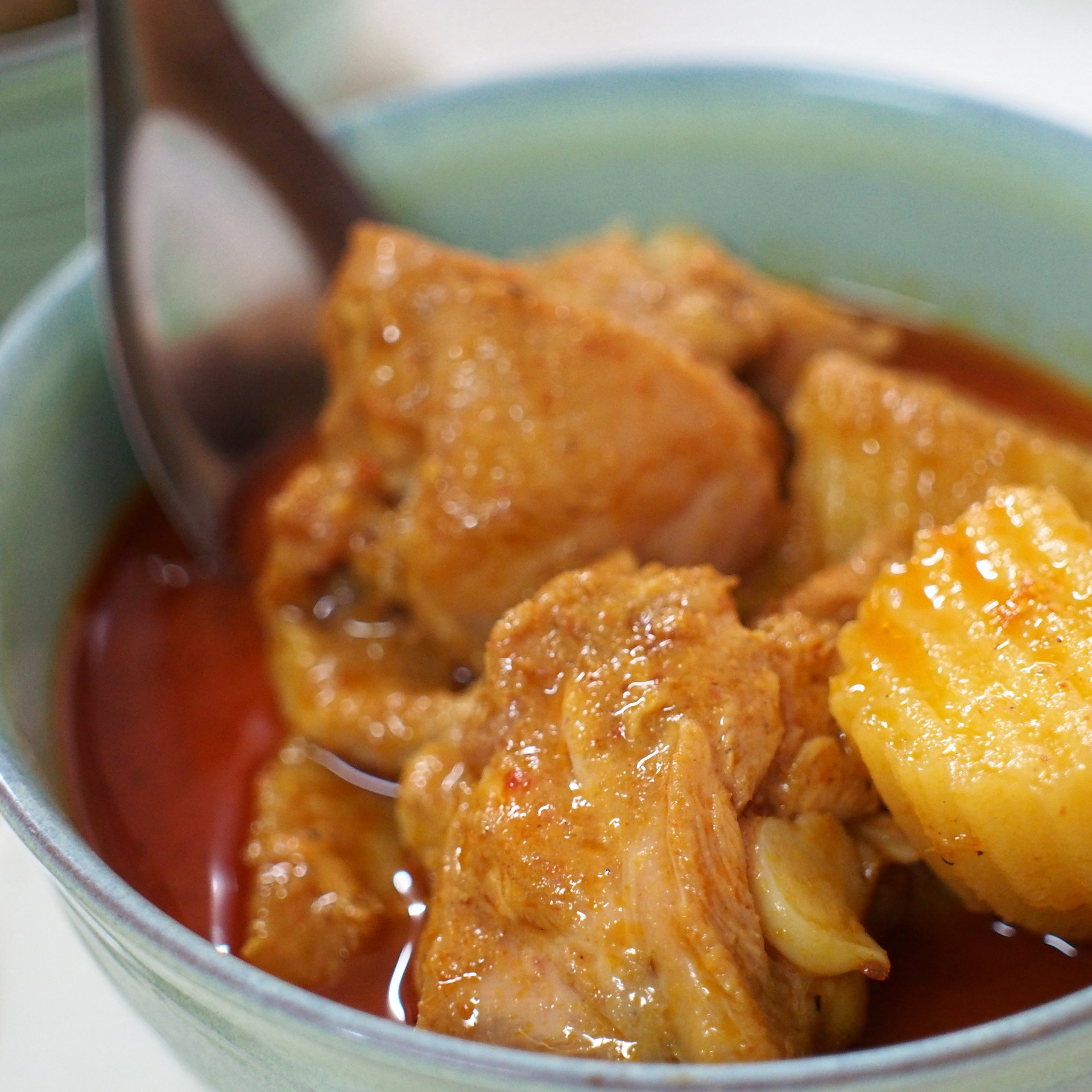
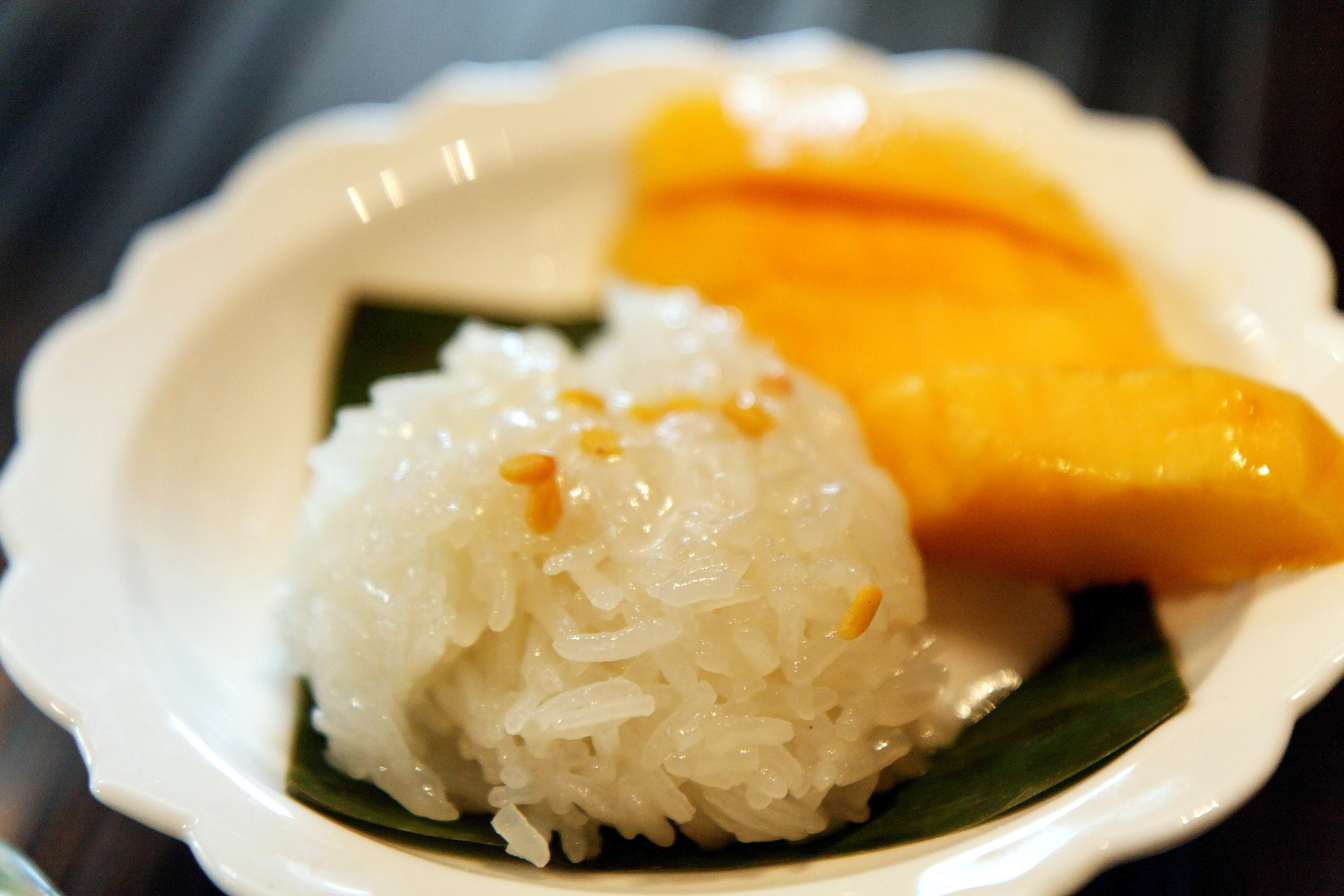
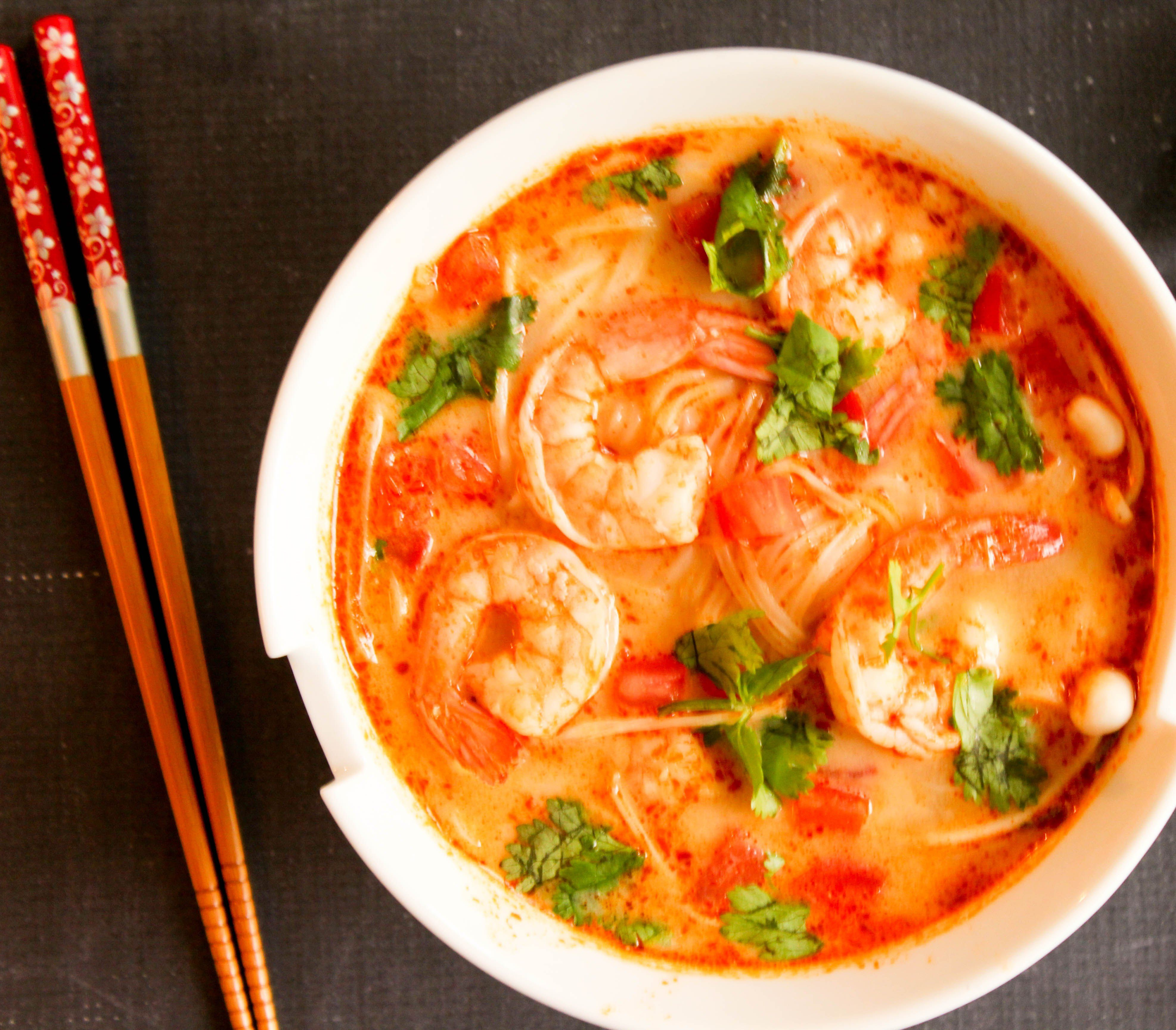
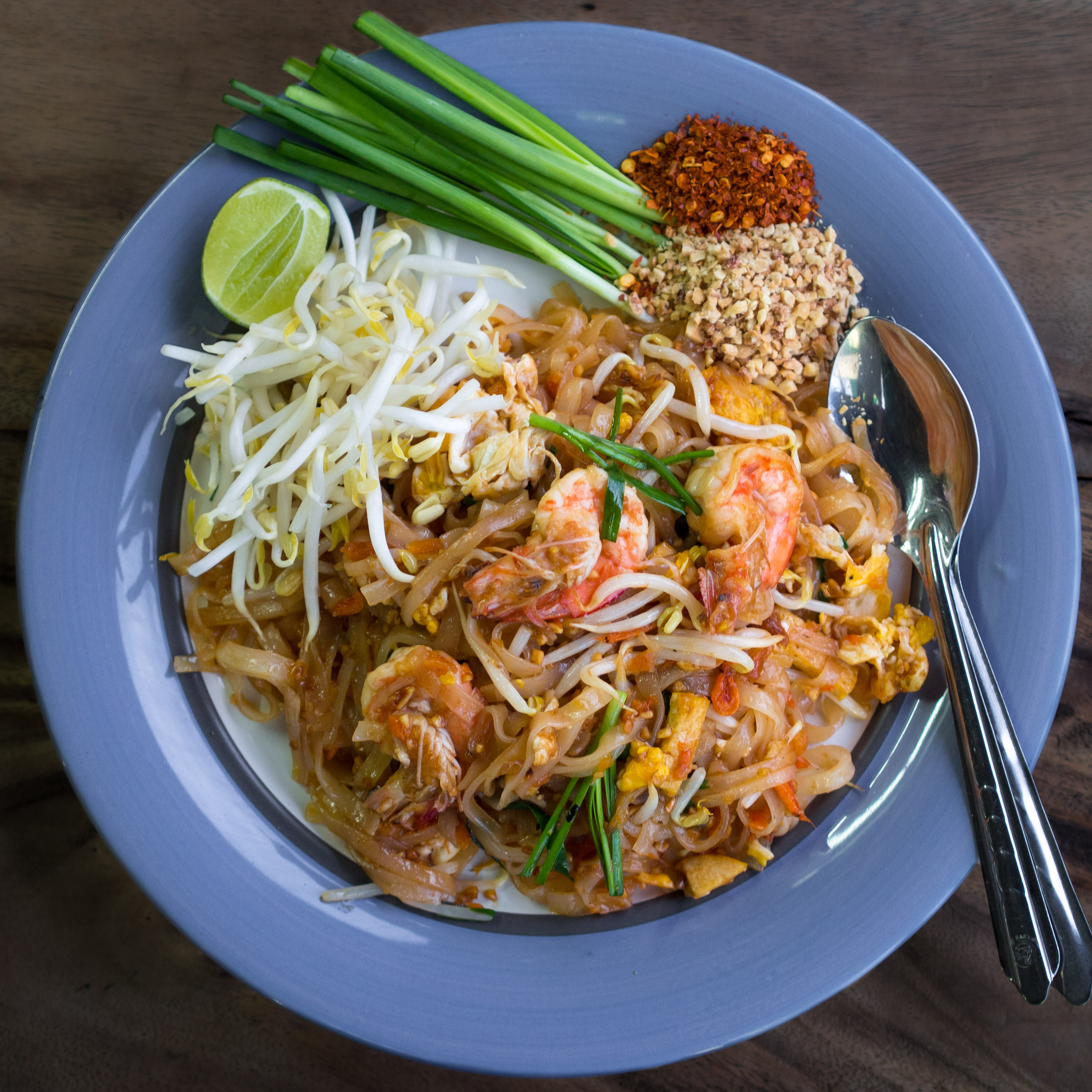
Clockwise from top left: Chicken massaman curry; mango sticky rice; pad Thai; and tom yum

Thai cuisine is highly celebrated globally, characterised by ingredients like garlic, lemongrass, kaffir lime, galangal, turmeric, coriander, and coconut milk. Cuisine varies distinctly by region: kaeng khiao wan (green curry) in the central region, som tam (green papaya salad) in the northeast, khao soi in the north, and massaman curry in the south. In 2017, seven Thai dishes—including tom yam goong, pad thai, and massaman curry—were featured on CNN Travel's "World's 50 Best Foods" list, more than from any other country.

Rice, particularly jasmine rice, is the staple of almost every meal. Thailand is a top global exporter of rice, with domestic consumption exceeding 100 kg per person annually. The country is also renowned for its vast street food culture—with Bangkok often called the street food capital of the world—and is a global leader in the edible insect industry.

=== Units of measurement ===
Thailand predominantly uses the metric system. However, traditional units are still used for land area, and imperial units are occasionally used for building materials. The Buddhist Era (B.E.) year is standard in government, education, and the civil service, while the Common Era is increasingly used in banking, industry, and commerce.

=== Sport ===
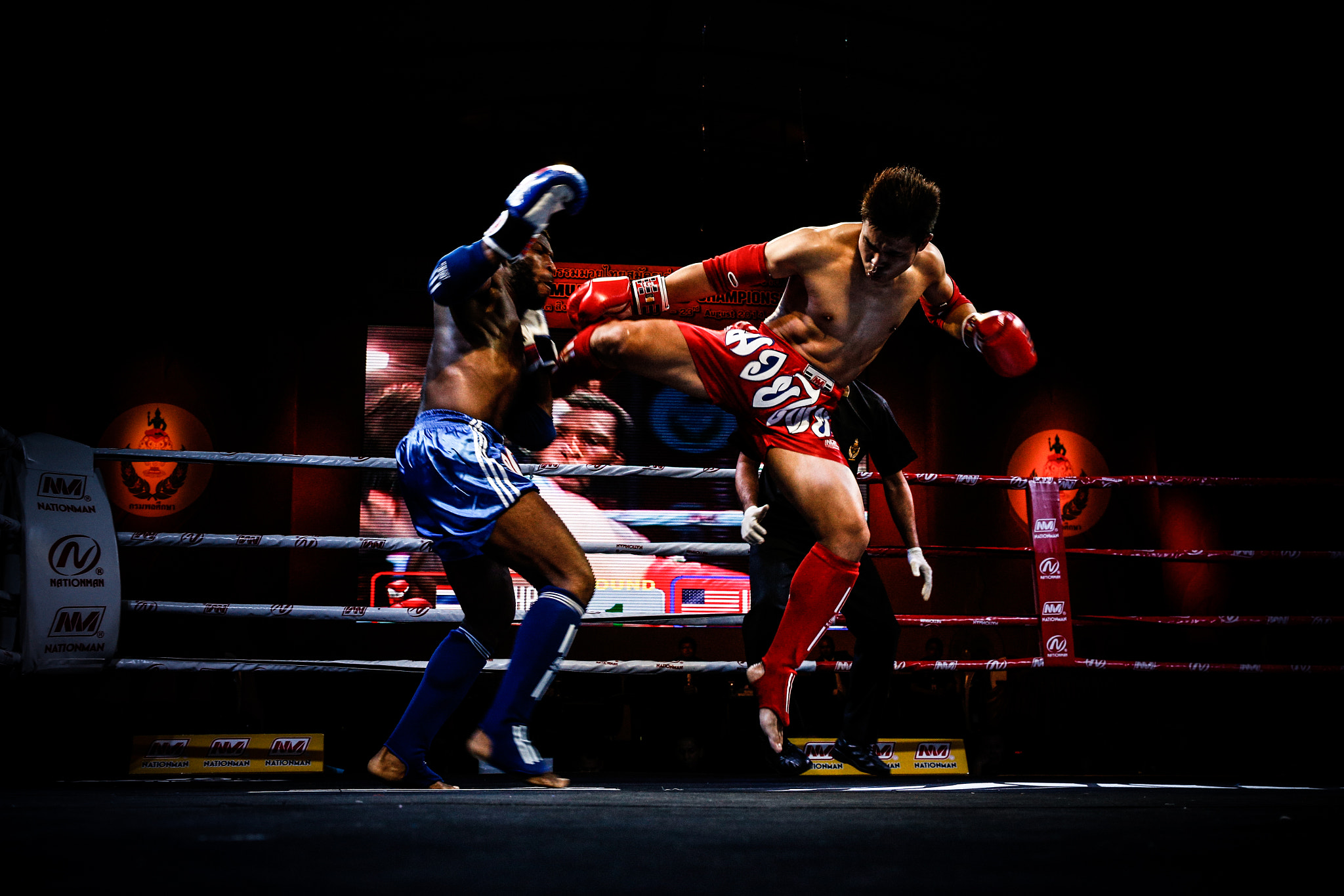
Muay Thai, Thailand's signature sport

Muay Thai (Thai boxing) is a native combat sport famed for its stand-up striking and clinching techniques. It gained international prominence in the late 20th century through practitioners like Buakaw Banchamek and Samart Payakaroon. Major fights take place at venues like the renowned Lumpinee Boxing Stadium in Bangkok. Today, Association football has overtaken Muay Thai as the most widely followed sport in the country. The Thailand national football team has competed in the AFC Asian Cup six times, and Thailand hosted the tournament in 1972 and co-hosted the tournament in 2007 alongside Indonesia, Malaysia, and Vietnam.

Volleyball is rapidly growing in popularity, led by the highly successful women's national team, which has won the Asian Championship multiple times. Another traditional sport is Sepak takraw, a native game similar to volleyball where players use only their feet, knees, chest, and head to hit a rattan ball. Thailand also features over 200 world-class golf courses, attracting golf tourism from across Asia and Western countries. The country's largest sporting arena is Rajamangala National Stadium, with a capacity of approximately 50,000.

== See also ==
- International rankings of Thailand
- Outline of Thailand

== Bibliography ==
- Baker, Chris; Phongpaichit, Pasuk (2014). A History of Thailand (3rd ed.). Singapore: Cambridge University Press. ISBN 978-1-107-42021-2.
- Baker, Chris; Phongpaichit, Pasuk (2017). A History of Ayutthaya. Cambridge University Press. ISBN 978-1-107-19076-4.
- Coedès, George (1968). Vella, Walter F. (ed.). The Indianized States of Southeast Asia. Translated by Cowing, Susan Brown. University of Hawaii Press. ISBN 978-0-8248-0368-1.
- Harvey, G. E. (1925). History of Burma. London: Frank Cass & Co. Ltd. OCLC 7656028.
- Higham, Charles (1989). The Archaeology of Mainland Southeast Asia. Cambridge University Press. ISBN 978-0-521-27525-5.
- Higham, Charles (2014). Early Mainland Southeast Asia. Bangkok: River Books Co., Ltd. ISBN 978-616-7339-44-3.
- Hoshino, Tatsuo (2002). "Wen Dan and its neighbours: the central Mekong Valley in the seventh and eighth centuries". In Ngaosrivathana, Mayoury; Breazeale, Kennon (eds.). Breaking New Ground in Lao History: Essays on the Seventh to Twentieth Centuries. Chiang Mai: Silkworm Books. ISBN 978-974-7551-93-8.
- Jumsai, M. L. Manich (1967). History of Laos. Chalermnit. OCLC 24502140.
- Kasetsiri, Charnvit (2005). อยุธยา: ประวัติศาสตร์และการเมือง [Ayutthaya: History and Politics] (in Thai). Thammasat University Press. ISBN 978-974-91572-7-5.
- Keyes, Charles F. (1997). "Cultural Diversity and National Identity in Thailand". In Brown, Michael E.; Ganguly, Sumit (eds.). Government policies and ethnic relations in Asia and the Pacific. MIT Press. ISBN 978-0-262-52245-8.
- LePoer, Barbara Leitch (1989). Thailand: A Country Study. Federal Research Division, Library of Congress. OCLC 28066032.
- Lonely Planet's Best of Thailand. Lonely Planet guidebooks. Footscray, Vic.: Lonely Planet. 2020. ISBN 978-1-78701-366-7. OCLC 1312080896.
- Nolan, Cathal J. (2002). The Greenwood Encyclopedia of International Relations: S-Z. Greenwood Publishing. ISBN 978-0-313-32383-6.
- Ruangsilp, Bhawan (2007). Dutch East India Company Merchants at the Court of Ayutthaya: Dutch Perceptions of the Thai Kingdom c. 1604–1765. Leiden, Netherlands: Koninklijke Brill NV. ISBN 978-90-04-15600-5.
- Thepthani, Phra Borihan (1953). Thai National Chronicles: the history of the nation since ancient times (in Thai). S. Thammasamakkhi.
- Wyatt, David K. (1984). Thailand: A Short History. New Haven: Yale University Press. ISBN 978-0-300-03054-9.
- Wyatt, David K. (2001). "Relics, Oaths and Politics in Thirteenth-Century Siam". Journal of Southeast Asian Studies. 32 (1): 3–65. doi:10.1017/s0022463401000017.
- Wyatt, David K. (2003). Thailand: A Short History (2nd ed.). Yale University Press. ISBN 978-0-300-08475-7. OCLC 53392823.
- Wyatt, David K. (2013). Thailand: A Short History (in Thai). Translated by La-ongsri, Kanchanee. Foundation for the Promotion of Social Sciences and Humanities Textbooks Project, Toyota Foundation Thailand. ISBN 978-616-7202-38-9.
- Zhou, Daguan (2007). A Record of Cambodia: The Land and Its People. Translated by Harris, Peter. Silkworm Books. ISBN 978-1-62840-172-1.
