= Salim (Thai slang) =

Thai political slang term

In contemporary Thai politics, salim (Thai: สลิ่ม, pronounced [sā.lìm]) is a Thai slang referring to people who are skeptics of democracy and supports the military's involvement in politics. Politicist Surachart Bamrungsuk saw salims as representatives of right wing middle class. The term initially referred to the "multicoloured shirts" as a reference to the colourful Thai dessert sarim and was considered by some as a pejorative. It later included other people outside the "multicoloured shirts" as well. The term has been used on mainstream media by 2011. In late February 2020, the term gained popularity following the Thai Constitutional Court's order to disband the pro-democracy Future Forward Party. Students, seeing the order as a political abuse, began to use hashtags including the term salim as their online activism against the ruling.

== Origin ==
Thailand in 2005–2010 saw two main political sides either supporting or opposing then prime minister Thaksin Shinawatra. The two identified themselves by their shirt colours, nominally; the yellow shirts (anti-Thaksin) and the red shirts (pro-Thaksin). In 2010, a new political group Network of Citizen Volunteers Protecting the Land was formed and identified as the "multicoloured shirts" to distinguish it from the aforementioned two. Some netizens later called the group salim after Thai dessert sarim which is known for its colourfulness. The term is believed to be first used on Thai web-board Pantip.com.

== Definition ==
The term has always been a topic of various definitions and studies socially, politically, philosophically, and economically.

In 2010, Thatsana Thirawatphirom wrote that some shared traits in definitions of salim include ultra-royalism, religiosity (specifically Buddhism), being educated but uncritically believing the curricula, being broadly skeptical but gullible towards people who are seemingly knowledgeable, being a strong follower of political news and seeing Thaksin Shinawatra as a long-time threat to Thai politics, being bourgeois and trend-setters, and being highly hypocritical.

In 2011, Faris Yothasamuth describe the identifying qualities of salim as being the Thaksin-haters, monarchists, pro-military, democracy skeptics, who lacked reasoning and had a holier-than-thou attitude.

Since the 2020 Thai protests, the term has turned derogatory. It has since been used to refer to those who are ultraconservative, ultra-royalist, and pro-Prayut cabinet.

== Usages ==
Prior to 2020 protests, the term was sparsely used by some writers, journalists, and academics including Nidhi Eoseewong and Kham Phaka.

In late February 2020, the term gained popularity following the Thai Constitutional Court's order to disband the pro-democracy New Future Party. Students, seeing the order as a political abuse, began to use hashtags including the term salim as their online activism against the ruling. Some of them include "#BUกูไม่เอาสลิ่ม" (Bangkok University [BU] don't want salims), "#ราชภัฏอยากงัดกับสลิ่ม" (Rajabhat universities want to fight with salims), "#KUไม่ใช่ขนมหวานราดกะทิ" (Kasetsart University [KU] is not dessert with coconut milk [suggesting the dessert salim]). In 29 February, a channel SalimVEVO released the parody song named du salim (ดูสลิ่ม, lit. 'looking like a salim') with the lyrics beginning with "[salims are those who] love the specially tailored laws" on YouTube.
