= Khattiya Sawasdipol =

Thai army general and political activist

Khattiya Sawasdipol ขัตติยะ สวัสดิผล
- Born: 2 June 1951; Ratchaburi, Thailand
- Died: 17 May 2010 (aged 58); Bangkok, Thailand
- Military career
- Allegiance: Thailand
- Branch: Royal Thai Army; Royal Thai Armed Forces
- Service years: 1971-2010
- Rank: Major General
- Nickname: Se Daeng
- Commands: Internal Security Operations Command; 30th Cavalry Squadron, Queen's Guard
- Conflicts: Cold War; Laotian Civil War; Cambodian Civil War; Communist insurgency in Thailand; Communist insurgency in Malaysia; Vietnamese border raids in Thailand; Operation Chong Bok (1987); Thai–Laotian Border War; Southern Insurgency

Khattiya Sawasdipol (Thai: ขัตติยะ สวัสดิผล; RTGS: Khattiya Sawatdiphon; 2 June 1951 – 17 May 2010), alias Se Daeng (Thai: เสธ.แดง, 'red commander'), was a General officer in the Royal Thai Army, assigned to the Internal Security Operations Command, a political activist, and a book author.

Khattiya became known for his role in the 1970s campaign against communist insurgents in northeastern Thailand. After the 2006 coup d'état that toppled Prime Minister Thaksin Shinawatra, he joined the Red Shirt movement and led its most intransigent and militant wing. He was killed, apparently by a sniper, while giving an interview during the May 2010 unrest in Bangkok.

== Personal life ==
Khattiya was born in Photharam District, Ratchaburi Province. His father was an army captain. Khattiya had three younger sisters. Khattiya was married to Senior Captain (RTN) Janthra Sawasdipol, who died of cancer in 2006. One of their daughters, Khattiyah Sawasdipol, succeeded her father as a Red Shirt activist and was elected to parliament on the Pheu Thai Party's list in 2011.

Besides publishing a series of books ("Khom...Seh Daeng") about his adventures that became bestsellers in Thailand, he frequently appeared on television talk shows and had a cult following, achieving almost celebrity status. He came into conflict with the Thai police commander, General Seri Temiyavet, during the investigation of a gambling den in 2006. General Seri filed a libel suit against Khattiya, who was arrested and sentenced to prison for four months. Khattiya subsequently brought a 600 million baht libel suit against Seri for defamation.

== Military career ==
After graduating from Armed Forces Academies Preparatory School (class 11), and Chulachomklao Royal Military Academy (class 22), Khattiya began his army service in 1971. He was assigned to the paramilitary unit of Thahan Phran ("Rangers"), who fought against communist insurgents in the 1970s.

In his bestselling memoirs, Khattiya claimed to have taken part in CIA operations in Laos and Cambodia during the Second Indochina War and to have supported pro-American Hmong General Vang Pao in the Laotian Civil War. He reported that he took part in the assassination of 20 communists in 1976. Moreover, he described how he supposedly infiltrated jihadi groups in Aceh and Malaysia during the 1990s.

Khattiya was named the first commander of 30th Cavalry Squadron, Queen's Guard in 1990, and served in the position for one year before being promoted to colonel. Seven years later, he was promoted to Major General.

== Political activity ==
Khattiya was a supporter of former Prime Minister Thaksin Shinawatra, and an opponent of the 19 September 2006 military coup d'état. He joined the Red Shirt movement that is considered close to Thaksin, protested against the coup and the military-backed government that took power afterwards. The pro-Thaksin camp returned to power after their electoral victory in January 2008, and Khattiya vowed to protect it against a potential new coup attempt—if necessary with military force. On 18 October 2008, during the anti-Thaksin People's Alliance for Democracy (PAD) (or "Yellow Shirt") protests against the government, he announced his intention to "mobilise government supporters against any military attempt to seize political power", threatening that members of the pro-government Democratic Alliance against Dictatorship (DAAD) would use Molotov cocktails against any military vehicles taking part in a coup attempt.

Because of his comments, the commander-in-chief of the Thai army, General Anupong Paochinda, removed Khattiya from his post in the Internal Security Operations Command (ISOC) and reassigned him as the army's aerobics instructor. Khattiya, humiliated by the transfer, retorted that he had prepared a dance called the "throwing-a-hand-grenade dance". Khattiya organised the "Ronin Warriors", a group of a few dozen armed militants to fight against Yellow Shirts. He boasted of his fighters terrorising the protesters using M79 grenade launchers, killing one PAD guard and injuring 40.

On 14 January 2010, Army Commander Anupong Paochinda ordered the suspension of Khattiya Sawasdipol after an inquiry committee found that Khattiya had openly supported the DAAD, a political pressure group that called for new elections, which breached the principle that military officers not take sides in politics. The following day, Anupong's office in the Royal Thai Army Headquarters was attacked by high explosive rounds fired from an M79 grenade launcher, leaving the office demolished but no one injured. Khattiya denied responsibility for the attack.

In the news of the attack, Khattiya was described by BBC as a "renegade Thai general who backs anti-government protesters." A member of the protesters' radical wing, he accused the Red Shirt leaders—many of whom then distanced themselves from him—of not being hard line enough. During the Red Shirt occupation of Ratchaprasong, he expressed himself ready to lead his men into combat against the Thai army, if it dared to try to break up the protests by force.

== Death ==
At 19:20 on 13 May 2010, Khattiya was shot in the head, apparently by a sniper, at the intersection of the Sala Daeng BTS station, as he was being interviewed by Thomas Fuller of the New York Times. Critically wounded, he was admitted to Huachiew Hospital. On 16 May 2010, he suffered renal failure and underwent dialysis. His death was announced on 17 May 2010 at 09:20. At the time of his death, he was about to be cashiered from the Royal Thai Army for his refusal to obey orders to stay neutral.

During Khattiya's funeral, a woman named Laddawal Polrit appeared, claiming herself to have a son with the deceased Major General. Her claim stated that she and Khattiya first met in 2004 and had been involved in an intimate relationship, before Laddawal gave birth to a boy in 2005. Her claim also further stated that Khattiya would often find opportunity to spend time with her and her son as family, and even allowed the boy, Nakrob "Daeng Noi" Sawasdipol, the surname "Sawasdipol" after himself. The boy's status was later approved by Trang's Provincial Familial Court to be a legal son of the late General, part due to lack of appeal to such judgement.
