= Sarim (dessert) =

Thai dessert

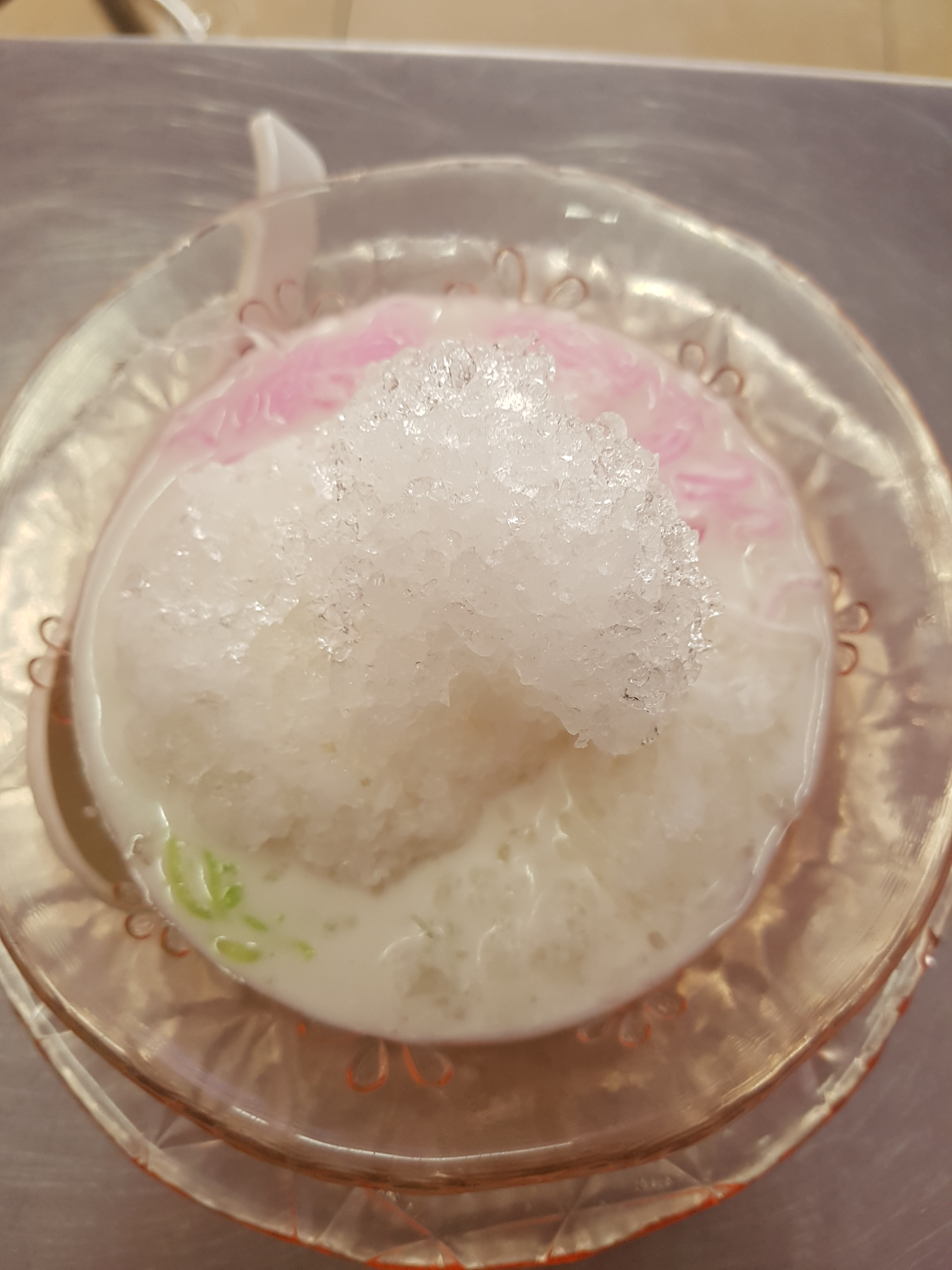
Sarim, served with ice on top

Sarim (Thai: ซ่าหริ่ม, pronounced [sâːrìm]; or ซาหริ่ม, pronounced [sāːrìm]) is a Thai dessert. It consists of colourful (usually pink and green) thin noodles made from mung bean flour in coconut milk and syrup, served cold with crushed ice. The dish is mentioned in the Kap He Chom Khrueang Khao Wan poem of King Rama II (r. 1809 – 1824), though back then it was seasoned with patchouli rather than served with ice.

== See also ==
- Salim (Thai slang), a political slur originating from the dessert's name
