= Network of Citizen Volunteers Protecting the Land =

The Network of Citizen Volunteers Protecting the Land (Thai: กลุ่มประชาชนเพื่อพิทักษ์ชาติ ศาสน์ กษัตริย์ or เครือข่ายพลเมืองอาสาปกป้องแผ่นดิน), commonly known as Multicolor Shirts, is a Thai political pressure group and protest movement, directed against the United Front for Democracy Against Dictatorship (UDD, or "Red Shirts"). It is led by Dr. Tul Sithisomwong, lecturer at the medical faculty of the Chulalongkorn University. Other names under which the movement operates include "Alliance of Patriots", "Protect the Nation", and "Civil Network against Thaksin's Corruption Pardon".

The grouping has got together out of disagreement with the Red Shirts' heavy protests in 2010 which led to several road closures and blockage of major shopping malls around the Ratchaprasong intersection. The clashes between Red Shirts and security forces caused the loss of lives, considerable damage to the national economy, and spread of terror amongst the population. The network holds the UDD alone liable for these devastating effects. The Multicolor Shirts' agenda is to make the Red Shirt leaders accountable for the damages and crimes. Meanwhile, they supported the government of Abhisit Vejjajiva and the approach of the command of the armed forces that ordered its troops to crack down the protests. Unlike the UDD ("Red Shirts"), and the People's Alliance for Democracy (PAD, or "Yellow Shirts"), the network's adherents wear shirts in various colors. The network's supporters, predominantly originating from the Bangkok middle-classes, customarily wave masses of tricolour Thai national flags.

The first major public action of the "Multicolor Shirt" group was a gathering in front of the Victory Monument in Bangkok, on 13 April 2010. Since this day, the movement has held demonstrations nearly every day. In September 2010, the network started a signature collection against a bill granting amnesty to anyone prosecuted for actions connected to the 2010 political protests. In addition to rallies in public, the movement's leader, Dr. Tul, regularly files complaints before the Election Commission and the National Anti-Corruption Commission (NACC), and lawsuits against prominent "Red Shirt" activists and Pheu Thai Party politicians, including controversial MP Jatuporn Prompan, and Prime Minister-elect Yingluck Shinawatra. After the Election Commission endorsed the parliamentarian's status of Jatuporn, the movement also announced to sue the EC itself.

The network's supporters include several exponents of show business and the popular culture, such as musician "J" Jetrin Wattanasin, film maker Suthep Po-ngam, or singer-actor Leo Putt.
