= Hiro Muramoto =

Hiro Muramoto (村本 博之, Muramoto Hiroyuki; c.1966 – April 10, 2010) was a Japanese TV cameraman and journalist, who worked for the Australian Broadcasting Corporation in Tokyo in the 1990s, and who reported for Reuters television for more than 15 years. Muramoto was based in Reuters' Tokyo bureau.

Muramoto was the first reporter killed during the 2010 Thai street protests. Photojournalist Fabio Polenghi died in another demonstration on May 19, 2010.

== Career ==
A graduate of Temple University (Japan Campus), Muramoto worked at NBC and then ABC. He joined Reuters as a freelance cameraman in 1992 and became full-time in 1995. During his time with Reuters, he traveled to high-risk areas North Korea and the Philippines (during political instability). He also covered human-interest stories such as Tokyo monkey-waiters and the man who married a character from a video game.

Also active in charity projects, Muramoto walked 100 km in two days in the areas around Mount Fuji to raise money for impoverished communities in Africa. His plan was to attend this walk for a third time starting April 22.

== Death ==
Muramoto was shot and killed on April 10, 2010, while covering violent clashes during the 2010 Thai political protests between Thai troops and anti-government protesters. Muramoto was filming clashes between protests and government forces on Rajdamnoen Road in Bangkok. Muramoto was shot in the chest during the clash. The bullet exited his back, though doctors could not tell what type of bullet. Muramoto was taken to Klang Hospital where he was pronounced dead, according to hospital director, Dr. Pichaya Nakwatchara. He was 43 years old and survived by his wife, Emiko, and two children.

The Thai military initially claimed to be shooting rubber bullets and tear gas, and only shooting live rounds into the air. However, video footage showed soldiers firing assault rifles in fully automatic fire mode in the direction of protesters. Protest leaders claimed that a number of people were hit by army snipers from nearby buildings. The military later admitted that troops fired live rounds directly at protesters, allegedly shooting only single rounds to protect injured troops retreating from the clashes.

== Reactions ==
Reuters Editor-in-Chief David Schlesinger reacted in response to Muramoto's death, "I am dreadfully saddened to have lost our colleague Hiro Muramoto in the Bangkok clashes... Journalism can be a terribly dangerous profession as those who try to tell the world the story thrust themselves in the center of the action. The entire Reuters family will mourn this tragedy."

A Thai Army spokesperson claimed that protesters had attacked soldiers with grenades and petrol bombs before troops responded. The 2010 clashes, which led to calls for the resignation of Prime Minister Abhisit Vejjajiva's government, have been the worst political violence in Bangkok for 18 years.

== See also ==
- Kenji Nagai, photojournalist shot by a soldier in Rangoon, 2007
- Fabio Polenghi, an Italian freelance photographer, 2010
- Lucas Dolega, photojournalist shot by a policeman in Tunis, 2011
- Press Freedom Index

== Further reading and resources ==
- Agence France-Presse (2010-04-13). "Remains of slain Japanese journalist returned from Thailand". AFP. mysinchew.com. Archived from the original on 2013-12-25.
- Committee to Protect Journalists (2010-04-12). "Reuters cameraman killed in Thai political violence". New York: Committee to Protect Journalists. Archived from the original on 2010-04-15.
- Joyce, Rodney (2010-04-12). "Remembering Hiro's gentle smile". Analysis and Opinion. Reuters. Archived from the original on 2010-04-14.
- Reporters Without Borders (2010-04-10). "Japanese cameraman fatally shot in clashes between troops and Red Shirts". Reporters Without Borders.
- Tahara, Norimasa; Yomiuri Shimbun (2010-04-13). "Death stuns Muramoto family". Yomiuri Shimbun. Archived from the original on 2010-04-22.
- Mainichi Daily News (2010-04-13). "Reuters confirms Japanese cameraman killed amid violent clashes in Bangkok". Mainichi Japan. Archived from the original on 2010-04-15.
