= 2010 Thai military crackdown =

State suppression of pro-democracy protests in Bangkok, Thailand

- Part of 2010 Thai political protests
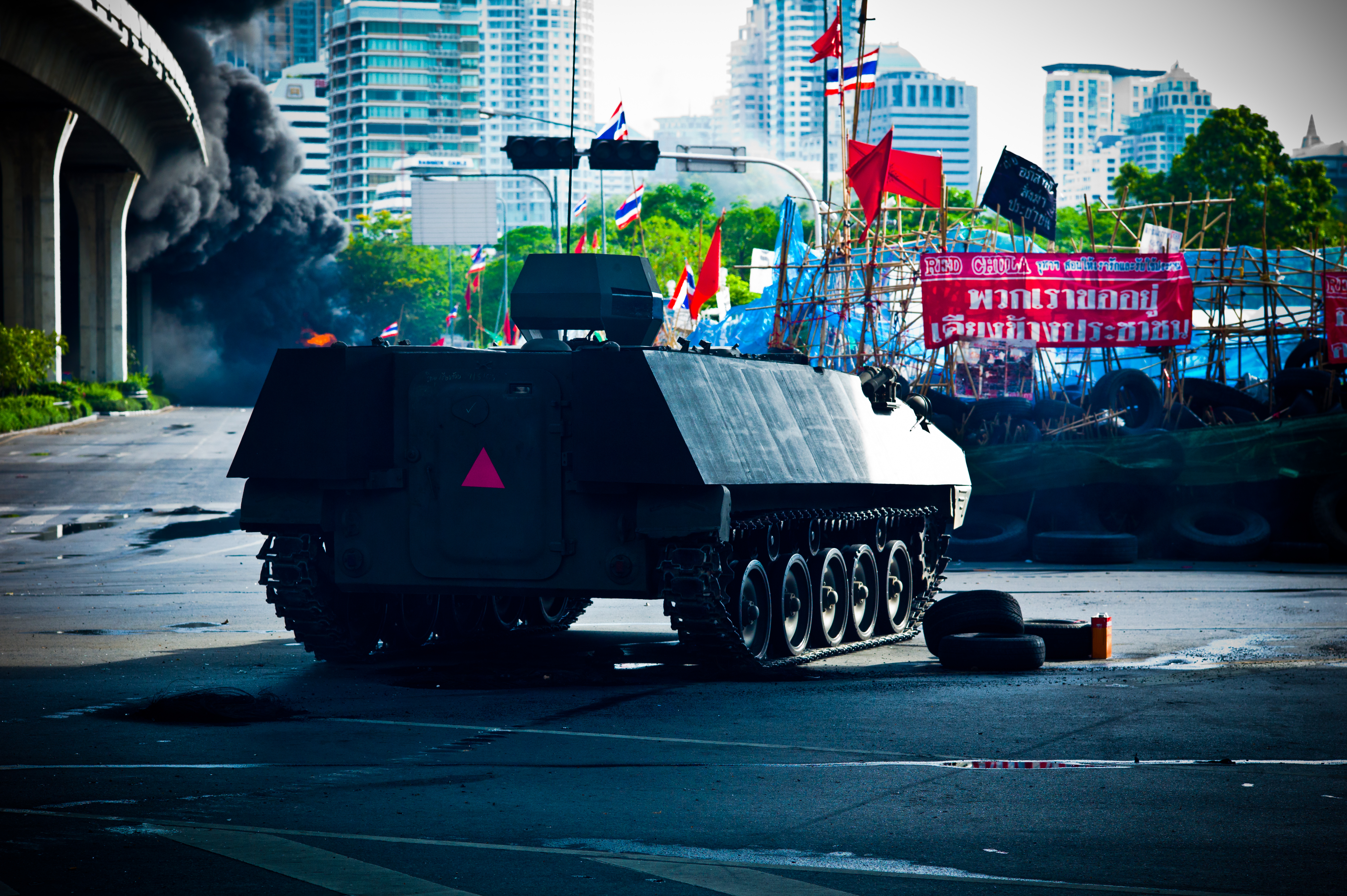
- A Type 85 AFV prepares to assault the Red Shirt barricade at Sala Daeng intersection, 19 May 2010
- Location: Bangkok, Thailand
- Date: April to May 2010
- Attack type: Extended large-scale military crackdown
- Deaths: 87 (79 civilians, 8 soldiers), 51 missing civilians as of 8 June.
- Injuries: At least 2,100
- Perpetrators: Royal Thai Army and associated Royal Thai Government security forces

On 10 April and 13–19 May 2010, the Thai military cracked down on the United Front for Democracy Against Dictatorship (UDD) protests in central Bangkok, the capital of Thailand. The crackdown was the culmination of months of protests that called for the Democrat Party-led government of Abhisit Vejjajiva to dissolve parliament and hold elections. The crackdowns occurred in the vicinity of protest sites near Phan Fa Lilat Bridge and Ratchaprasong intersection. More than 85 were killed, including more than 80 civilians according to the Erawan EMS Center. Two foreigners and two paramedics were killed. More than 2,000 were injured, an undisclosed number of arrests occurred, and 51 protesters remained missing as of 8 June. The Thai media dubbed the crackdowns "Cruel April" (Thai: เมษาโหด, RTGS: mesa hot) and "Savage May" (Thai: พฤษภาอำมหิต, RTGS: phritpha ammahit). After the protest, its leaders surrendered at the conclusion of the 19 May crackdown, followed by dozens of arson attacks nationwide, including at CentralWorld. Two red shirts who were accused of arson were acquitted later in both courts.

On 10 April, troops executed an unsuccessful crackdown on protesters at Phan Fa Bridge on Ratchadamnoen Avenue, resulting in 25 deaths (including a Japanese journalist and five soldiers) and over 800 injuries. Troops fired on protesters near Makkhawan Rangsan Bridge during the afternoon. Later that evening, automatic gunfire, explosives, and tear gas were used in clashes on Khao San Road and Khok Wua Intersection. The Erawan Center noted that among the dead were soldiers disguised as protesters. The military claimed that soldiers only used live rounds to defend themselves, and claimed that the military deaths were due to terrorists. While the April crackdown was unsuccessful, the protest leaders at Phan Fa ultimately decided to move out of the location and join the main protest group at Ratchaprasong, citing safety considerations.

Ratchaprasong was surrounded with armoured vehicles and snipers in the days leading to 13 May. On the evening of 13 May, Khattiya Sawasdiphol ("Seh Daeng"), a popular security adviser to the protesters, was shot in the head by a sniper's bullet while he was giving an interview to The New York Times. The state of emergency, already in place in Bangkok, was expanded to 17 provinces and the military commended an extended crackdown, leading to an additional 41 civilian deaths (including an Italian photographer) and more than 250 injuries by 8:30 pm on 18 May. One military death occurred due to friendly fire. The military claimed that all civilians killed were either armed terrorists or civilians shot by terrorists, and noted that some civilians were shot by terrorists disguised in army uniforms. The military declared the area a "live fire zone", and medics were banned from entering. On 16 May, UDD leaders said they were ready for talks as long as the military pulled back, but the government demanded the protesters' unconditional dispersal. The government rejected a Senate call for a ceasefire and Senate-mediated negotiations. On 17 May, Amnesty International called for the military to stop using live ammunition. Armored vehicles led the final assault into Ratchaprasong in the early morning of 19 May, killing at least five. Soldiers were reported to have fired on medical staff who went to the aid of shooting victims. By 1:30 pm, UDD leaders surrendered to police and told protesters to disperse. Dozens of arson attacks broke out nationwide. A curfew was declared and troops were authorized to shoot on sight anybody inciting unrest.

== Background ==
In Thailand, a series of political protests against the Democrat Party-led government occurred in March to May 2010 as a result of an ongoing political crisis. Anger against Thai Prime Minister Abhisit Vejjajiva's government was high throughout 2009, due to the controversial legal and military maneuvering that led to the formation of the government. In February 2010, Abhisit tightened security in anticipation of a controversial Supreme Court ruling on former Prime Minister Takshin Shinawatra. When the 26 February ruling confirmed the bribery accusations, protests were limited, but the UDD announced it would organize a 14 March protest and call for new elections. Abhisit further tightened security in anticipation of the protest. The media was censored, and radio stations and television stations sympathetic to the protesters were shut down.

== Timeline ==
=== 10 April ===
The crackdown against protesters on 10 April occurred along the middle stretch of Ratchadamnoen Avenue, from Phan Fa Lilat Bridge towards the Democracy Monument, along with the surrounding area. Military personnel dropped tear gas from helicopters and shot at protesters. The clashes led to 19 civilian deaths from the afternoon to late evening, mostly concentrated at Khok Wua Intersection and Dinso Road at the north side of the Democracy Monument. In the late evening, around 8:30 pm, a group of armed people dressed in black emerged at Khok Wua, attacking the soldiers with guns and explosives. Five soldiers were killed by an explosion during the clashes.

As of 2020, the identity of these 'men in black' (Thai: ชายชุดดำ, romanized: chai chut dam) remain unclear. The government stated that they were aligned with the protesters and often cited them later to justify its use of force. Later cases of violence during the subsequent crackdowns would often be attributed to "men in black", which came to be used interchangeably with "terrotist".

Having failed to reclaim the area, the military withdrew from the area. One civilian, a zookeeper mistaken for a protester, was later shot at the nearby Dusit Zoo. Despite managing to hold the site, the protest leaders at Phan Fa subsequently decided to end the protest at the location on 14 April. The protesters then moved to join the main group, which had been occupying the shopping district around Ratchaprasong Intersection.

=== 13–18 May ===
On Thursday, 13 May, Thai Army Major General Khattiya Sawasdipol, better known as Seh Daeng ('Commander Red'), a self-described key military adviser to the red-shirts who was suspended from duty in the Thai army, was shot by an unknown sniper around 7 pm local time while being interviewed by The New York Times. A backer and part of the protesters' more radical wing, he had accused Red Shirt leaders of not being hardline enough.

On Friday, 14 May, Thai police army units moved in to surround and cut off the protesters' main camp, meeting heavy resistance from the Red Shirts resulting in the deaths of two people with dozens more injured. One of the Red Shirt leaders, Nattawut Saikuar, accused Prime Minister Abhisit Vejjajiva of starting a civil war. This came as there were reports of a policeman opening fire on soldiers near a police station in Bangkok, showing that there may be divisions within the security services themselves. Both the British and US embassies in Bangkok confirmed they were to close for security reasons.

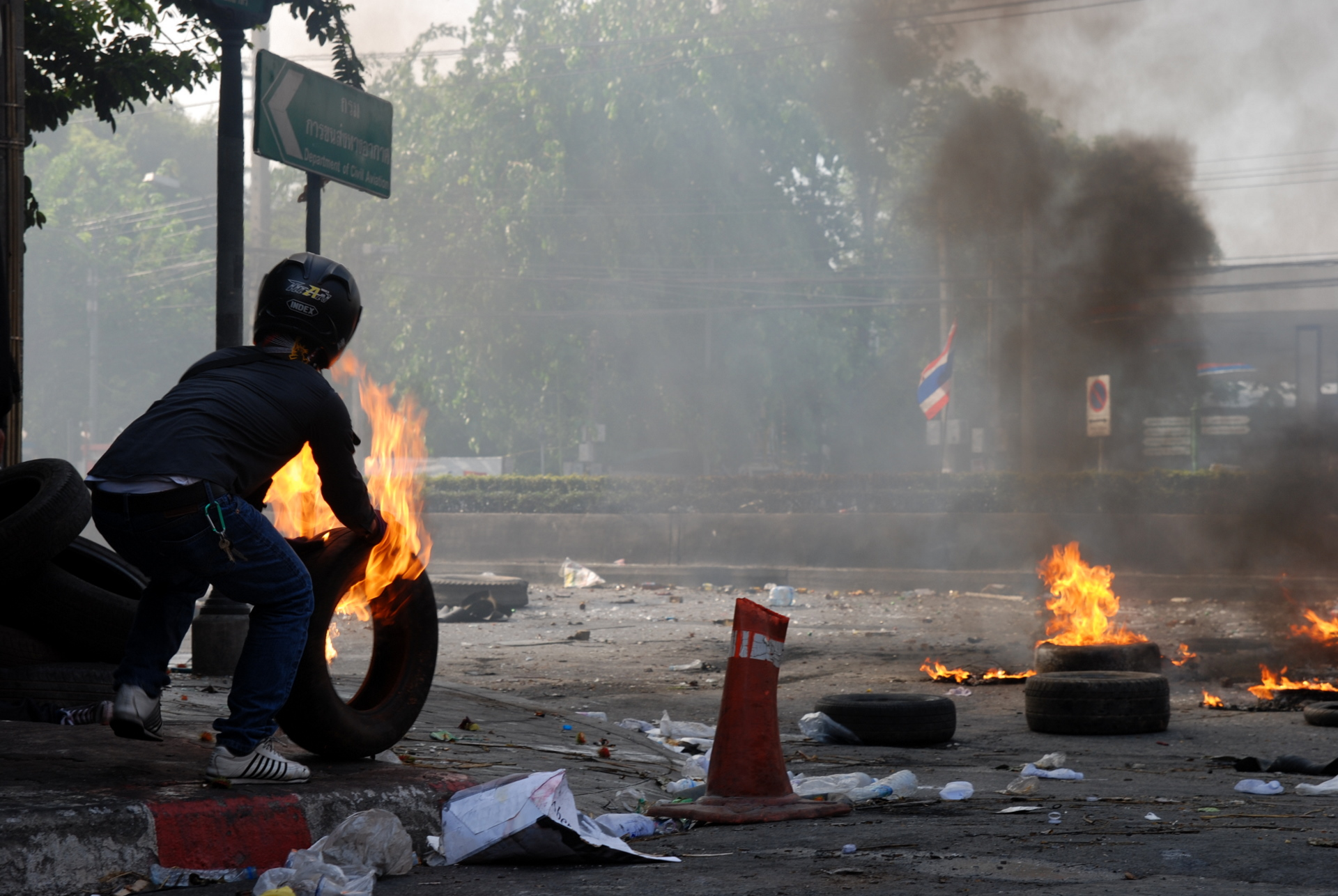
Rama IV Road during clashes, 15 May 2010

Just before 3:00 pm GMT on 14 May, Sky News reported that the death-toll from the latest fighting had risen to five, with 46 others wounded. People in Bangkok claimed that the area has descended into a war zone as the two sides battled for control. During the clashes, France 24 journalist Nelson Rand was "gravely wounded" by bullets from a Thai Army assault rifle, although who actually used the weapon is still unknown. On Friday night, several grenade explosions were heard from a nearby shopping centre and municipal railway station in the up-scale shopping area. As of 6:00 pm 14 May, the BBC reported that seven people had died and over 100 were wounded in the latest violence in Bangkok, as Canada announced the temporary closure of its embassy.

According to The Telegraph, as of 9:40 pm GMT 14 May, at least 16 people had been killed, none of whom were members of the security services. There were several incidents of police officers joining with the Red Shirts and exchanging fire with the Thai Army, prompting fears that a civil war was coming. The number of injured was thought to be 157, with that number predicted to rise significantly as fighting continued.

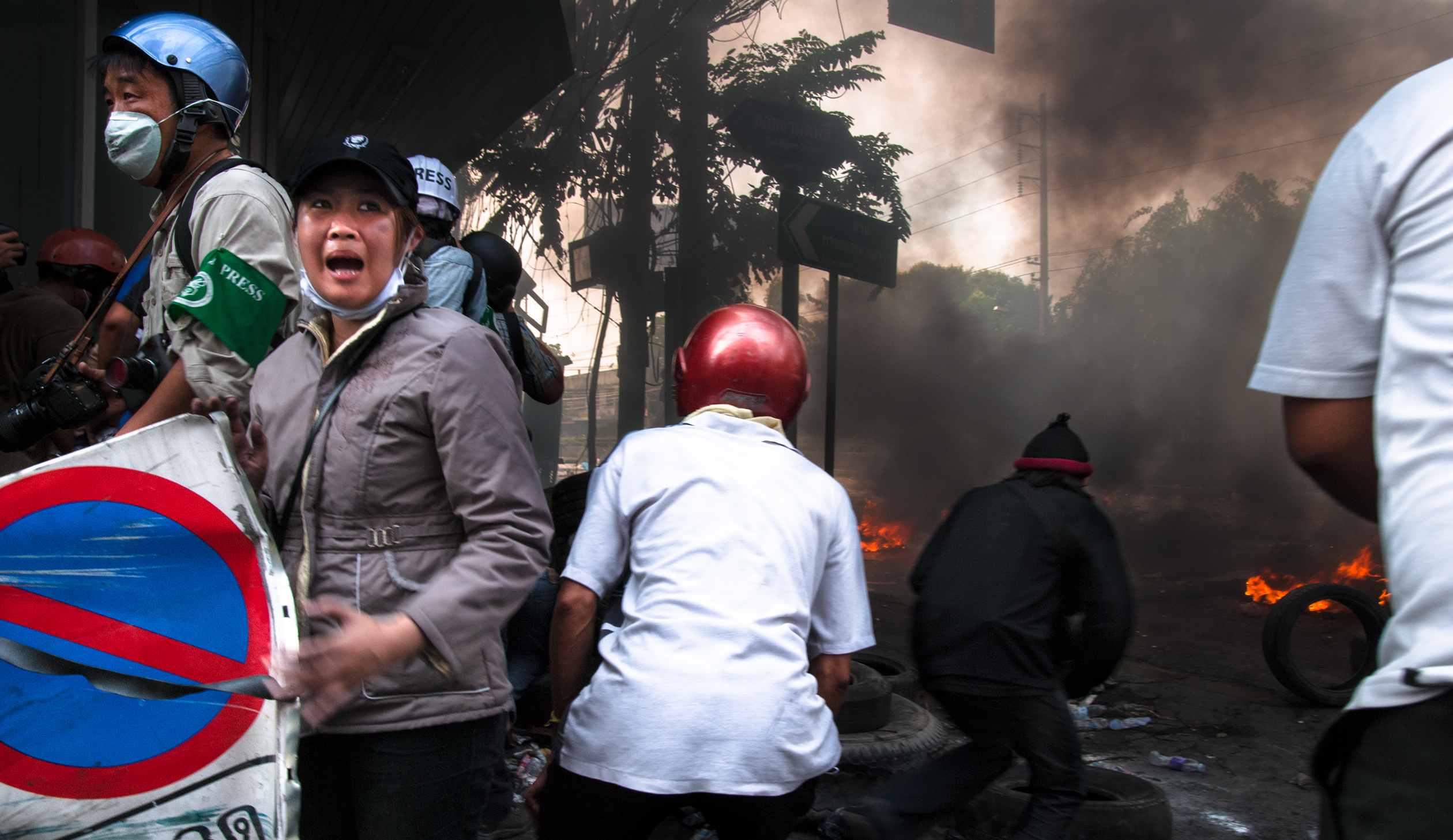
Rescue workers try to reach two wounded men under army fire, 15 May 2010

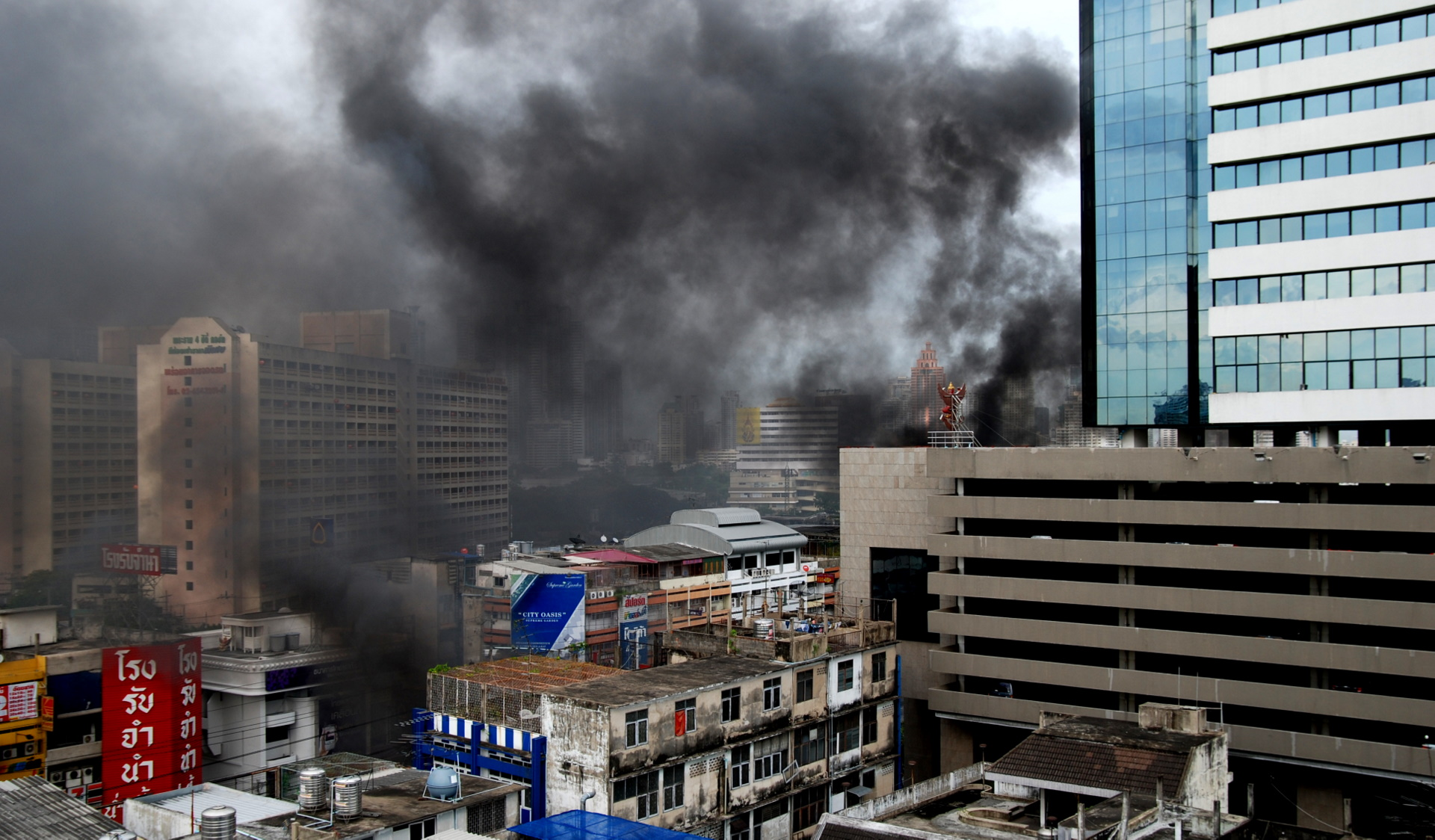
Smoke from burning tires hangs over Bangkok, 16 May 2010

By 2:20 am GMT on 15 May, the death toll reached 16, with more than 157 injured. Street battles continued, with no end in sight. Total casualties since 12 May amount to 24 killed, with 187 injured on the night of 14/15 May alone. One of the dead was a sergeant of the Royal Thai Air Force, who was killed by friendly fire.

Protest leaders once again warned of civil war if the army attempted to storm their camp. Several areas of the city near the protesters were designated as "live fire zones" by the military, and protesters entering these zones were to be shot on sight. Due to food and water shortages as a result of the army blockade, it was estimated the protesters would only be able to hold out for a few more days, and after that have to start plundering the available local shops.

On 16 May, the death toll rose to 33, with the number of wounded rising to 230. Reporters in the vicinity of the violence had to cancel live broadcasts due to the threat of sniper attacks from military forces in the area. The government urged the very young and very old to leave the camp by Monday afternoon, prompting fears of an army crackdown. The Red Shirt leaders started telling the public that the foreign media, such as CNN, BBC, Reuters, and many others, cannot be trusted as they are biased, prompting a backlash of their international followers. On 17 May, Khattiya Sawasdiphol, who was shot in the head by a sniper on 13 May, died.

On 17 May, Thai military helicopters dropped leaflets on the Red Shirt's main encampment, urging them to leave. The Red Shirts responded by firing homemade rockets at the helicopters. The encampment was completely surrounded, and the Thai government gave Red Shirts a deadline of 3:00 pm local time to withdraw. Clashes continued, with Thai troops firing directly towards or at any movement around the protest perimeter with live ammunition, and protesters also using potentially lethal tactics, according to a Canadian journalist. Red Shirts shot fireworks at the Army, and utilized a broom handle to rapidly fire firecrackers. At least two Red Shirt protesters were shot by Thai Army snipers. According to Thai medical officials, the casualty toll stood at 35 dead, and 242 wounded. By the end of the day, the casualty toll had risen to 37 dead and 266 wounded.

Sporadic clashes continued on 18 May, but these skirmishes were less intense than some previous confrontations had been. The death toll rose to 39 as the day progressed, and it was widely believed that a military crackdown was imminent as troops and APC's gathered around the protest site urging residents and protestors to leave, declaring that a military operation was soon to commence. The Army moved in soon afterward, backed by armoured personnel carriers (APC) and smashed through the protestors main barricades. Two Red Shirts were shot and wounded during the opening stages of this operation as other Red Shirts set alight the kerosene soaked barricades to deter advancing soldiers and obscure their view.

=== 19 May assault ===
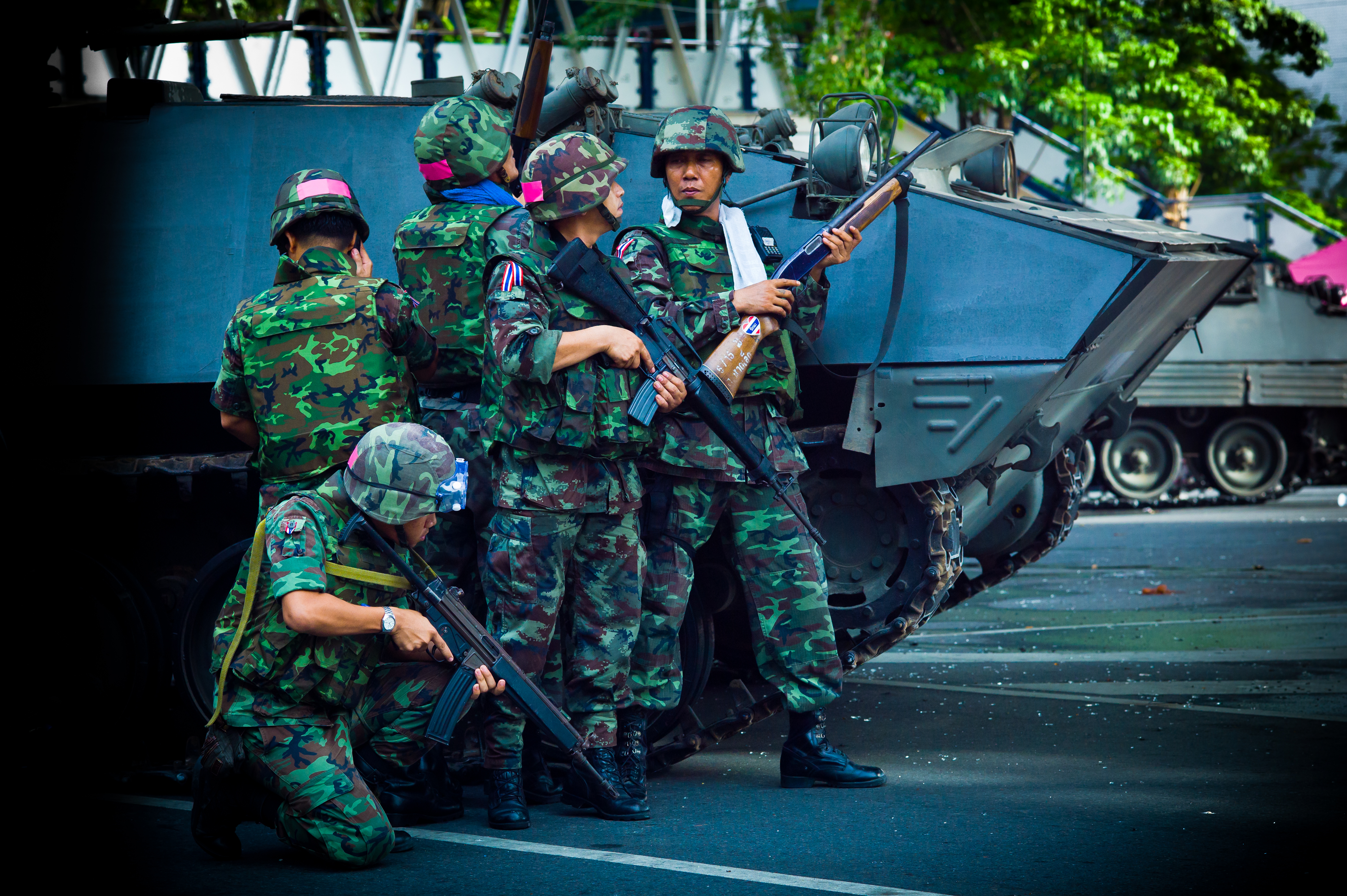
Soldiers of the Royal Thai Army take cover next to a Type 85 AFV near the Red Shirt barricade at Chulalongkorn Hospital

On 19 May, the army launched an all-out assault using APCs and breached Red Shirt barricades, leaving at least five dead along Ratchadamri Road leading up to Ratchaprasong, including Italian freelance photojournalist Fabio Polenghi. Two soldiers were seriously wounded in a grenade attack, possibly from an M79. The protest leaders surrendered to police in an attempt to avoid further bloodshed.

After the leaders declared the protests over, a number of protesters moved along Rama I Road to take shelter in Wat Pathum Wanaram, a Buddhist temple which had been used as a "safe zone" and contained first aid tents. Troops shot into the temple, killing six, which included volunteer medical personnel.

Fighting between Red Shirt protesters and the army continued in many parts of the city. Red Shirts also gathered in front of provincial halls in other provinces in response to the news of the crackdowns in Bangkok and were met by military personnel. Various provinces saw standoffs, which led to three protester deaths in two of the provinces, namely Khon Kaen and Udon Thani. Some provinces saw arson attacks against provincial halls and other buildings.

In Bangkok, there were arson attacks at the Central World mall and at least two other shopping centres, the Stock Exchange of Thailand and various banks, a TV station, and a cinema, which burned to the ground. The total number of burnt buildings was 35. Two Red Shirts were accused of setting fire at the Central World mall, but were acquitted three years later due to a lack of witnesses. The Appeal Court also ruled the two Red Shirts not guilty.

As of 2010, the total death toll since 14 May was believed to stand at 44.

== Death of Sergeant Phongchalit Phitayanonthakan ==
Sergeant Phongchalit Phitayanonthakan (จ่าอากาศเอกพงศ์ชลิต พิทยานนทกาญจน์), aged 51, of the Royal Thai Air Force's Ground Security Force Corps was shot and killed by friendly fire at an army checkpoint at 1:20 am of 17 May. Phongchalit and a Pilot Officer Aphichat Songyong (เรืออากาศตรีอภิชาติ ซ้งย้ง), aged 26, were wearing plainclothes and driving an unmarked Vigo pickup truck to the Sala Daeng Intersection checkpoint at high speed. Army troops at the checkpoint reported being fired upon by the people in the truck. The troops manning the checkpoint fired on the truck causing it to lose control and hit police vehicles parked nearby. The two men were taken to nearby Bangkok Christian Hospital, but Phongchalit was dead on arrival. Aphichat was injured, and later picked up from the hospital by commanders of the RTAF Ground Security Force Corps. The commanders had no comments about the circumstances of Sergeant Phongchalit's death. Phongchalit was one of the two troops killed in the extended 13–19 May military crackdown.

== Death of Fabio Polenghi ==
Deputy Prime Minister Suthep Thaugsuban claimed that Italian photographer Fabio Polenghi was killed by a grenade launched from a terrorist M79 grenade launcher and died side by side with a soldier. However, numerous reports including one by the International Federation of Journalists noted that Polenghi was shot. Autopsy results showed that Polenghi died from a high-velocity bullet that entered the heart, and caused damage to his lungs and liver. A reporter from Der Spiegel who was with Polenghi noted that he was photographing from the protesters' side and was running from advancing soldiers. The Italian Embassy announced it was pursuing its own investigation.

In May 2013, the results of a lengthy investigation in Thailand revealed that Fabio Polenghi, 48 years old at the time of his death, was felled by a 5.56 mm (M16) bullet from a soldier's weapon and was running away at the moment he was killed. Testimony from journalists Michel Maas, Manit Kamnan and Bradley Cox were included in the proceedings. Polenghi's work had appeared in Vanity Fair, Vogue, Marie Claire, and Elle.

== Aftermath ==
In the hours after military operations had wrapped up, a curfew was imposed on Bangkok for the first time since 1992, as well as on 23 provinces. Unrest spread to other cities across the country as Red Shirt sympathizers vandalized government facilities in Udon Thani and burned down the town hall, with the provincial governor requesting military intervention to stop the unrest. Early estimates into the economic impact of the fighting by the Thai finance ministry placed the total cost of the fighting at US$1.5 billion. Foot and motor vehicle patrols conducted by the Thai military were confronted by Red Shirt holdouts with small arms fire in an attempt to restrict the military's movement through territory previously held by the protesters. After the surrender of the protest leaders, dozens of arson attacks occurred throughout the nation, including Central World shopping center and the Stock Exchange of Thailand.

On 17 September 2012, the Truth for Reconciliation Commission of Thailand (TRCT) released its final report on the April–May 2010 political violence. According to US-based Center for Strategic and International Studies, "...the TRCT's final report seems to give a balanced treatment to both sides involved in the political violence two years ago—alleging that both the UDD and government security forces, including the military, were responsible for escalating the situation."
