= Red Shirts (Thailand) =

Thai political movement

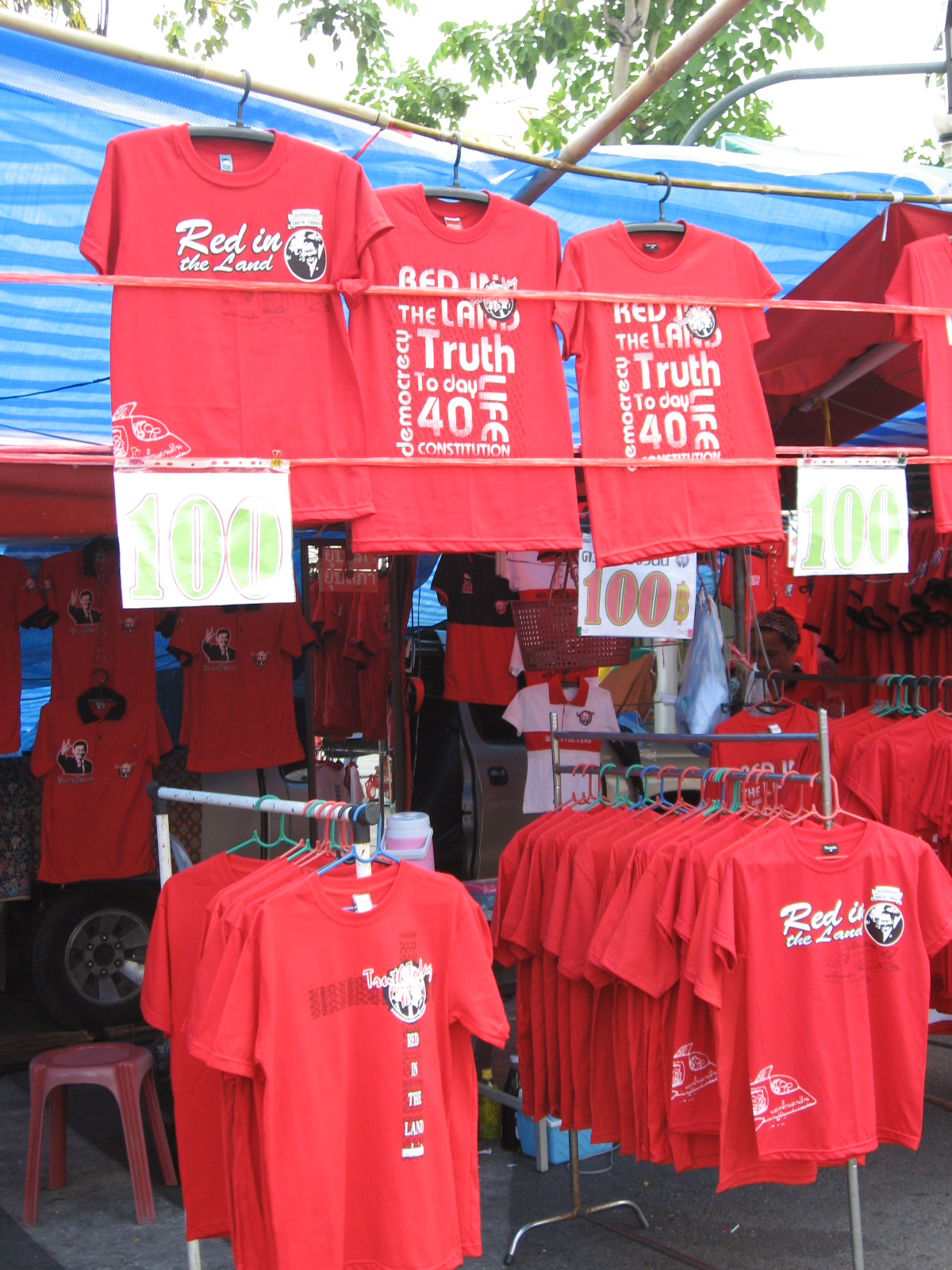
Red shirts for sale during UDD protests in 2010, Bangkok.

The Red Shirts (Thai: เสื้อแดง, romanized: Suea Daeng) are a political movement in Thailand, formed following the 2006 coup d'état which deposed then-Prime Minister Thaksin Shinawatra. Originally synonymous with the United Front for Democracy Against Dictatorship (UDD), a group formed to protest the coup and resulting military government, the movement subsequently expanded to include various groups with diverse political priorities. Its members range from left-wing and/or liberal activists and academics to the large number of Thaksin's rural and working-class supporters. The movement emerged as the result of socioeconomic changes in Northeast Thailand in the 1990s and 2000s, including a growing middle class, rising aspirations, and an increasing awareness of the extreme inequality and of the fundamentally weak democracy in Thailand, typified by Thailand's primate city problem. Red Shirts group dynamics center on frustrated economic and political aspirations to improve democracy and overcome inequality, which contributed to the 2009 Thai political unrest and the 2010 Thai political protests, as well as shared suffering at the hand of the ruling class hegemony. As with other minorities, the Red Shirts have been dehumanized and demonized, with insults such as "Red Buffalo" (Thai: ควายแดง, romanized: khwai daeng; khwai, 'buffalo', is a common insult in Thai meaning a stupid person), since reclaimed by some of its targets. Their claims for transitional justice following the 2010 Thai military crackdown have been subverted by the Thai state.

== See also ==
- People's Alliance for Democracy, or "yellow shirts", an opposing protest group
