= 2009 Thai political unrest =

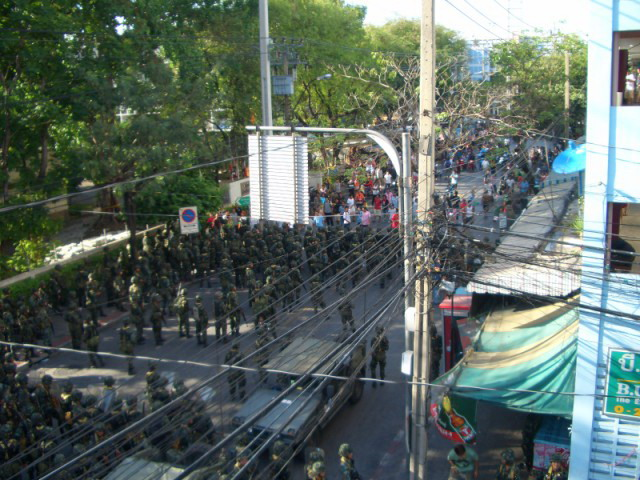
Red Shirt protesters confront the military on Pracha Songkhro Road, Bangkok, 13 April 2009

A series of political demonstrations and following unrest occurred in Thailand from 26 March to 14 April 2009 in Bangkok and Pattaya against the government of Abhisit Vejjajiva and the military crackdown that followed. Up to 100,000 people demonstrated in central Bangkok at the height of the protests. The crackdown is also known in Thailand as "Bloody Songkran" (Thai: สงกรานต์เลือด, romanized: Songkran lueat), referring to the Thai holiday of Songkran, which takes place on 13–15 April.

== Background ==
On 17 December 2008, Abhisit Vejjajiva, leader of the Democrat Party, was named Prime Minister, after the Constitutional Court of Thailand banned then-Prime Minister Somchai Wongsawat from politics for five years. In March 2009, Thaksin Shinawatra claimed via video broadcast that Privy Council President Prem Tinsulanonda had masterminded the 2006 military coup, and that Prem and fellow Privy Councilor members Surayud Chulanont and Chanchai Likhitjittha conspired with the military to ensure that Abhisit became Premier. Although there was no proof of Thaksin's charge and Abhisit denied the accusations, thousands of Shinawatra supporters protested in Bangkok in early April, demanding that Abhisit resign as prime minister and that Prem, Surayud, and Chanchai resign from the Privy Council. Thaksin then called for a "peoples revolution" to overcome the alleged aristocratic influences of the Abhisit government. The protests, led by the red-shirted National United Front of Democracy Against Dictatorship (UDD), expanded to Pattaya, where the Fourth East Asia Summit was to be held. Violent clashes broke out between the UDD and blue-shirted government supporters affiliated with Newin Chidchob, leader of the Bhumjaithai Party. The protesters broke into the hotel and forced the summit to be cancelled, causing Abhisit to declare a state of emergency in both Pattaya and Chonburi on 11 April.

== Popular protests ==
=== 8 April ===
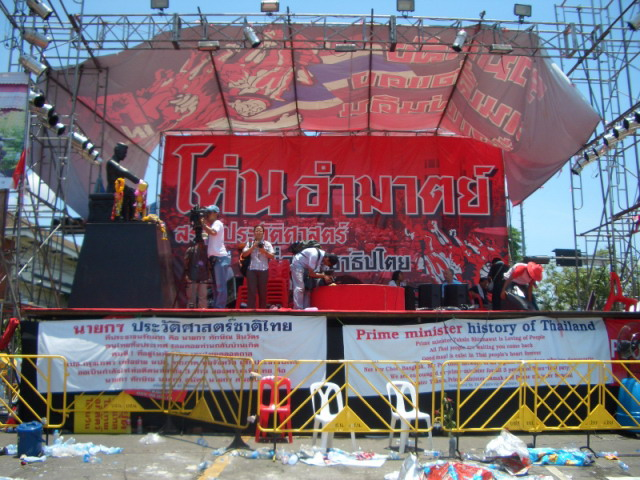
The red shirt stage

The mass protest began with 100,000 demonstrators, supporters of ousted former Prime Minister Thaksin Shinawatra, were at Government House and the nearby Royal Plaza by the evening.

Veera Musikapong, Jatuporn Prompan, Nattawut Saikua and Jakrapop Penkair leaders of the National United Front of Democracy Against Dictatorship (UDD) have bulletin "8 April: The Day for Fall of Aristocratic Polity" for Abhisit Vejjajiva resign from the Premiership and that Prem Tinsulanonda, Surayud Chulanont and Chanchai Likhitjittha resign from the Privy Council within 24 hours, otherwise it would announce raising the level of its anti-government protest.

On 04.45 p.m. UDD protesters marched from the residence of Privy Council president Prem Tinsulanonda to the Victory Monument, the city's largest traffic and transport hub, to join about hundred taxi drivers who parked their vehicles blocked roads around the area.

=== 11 April ===
The protests, led by the red-shirted National United Front of Democracy Against Dictatorship (UDD) expanded to Pattaya, the site of an ASEAN summit. The taxi-drivers with their cabs, leading supporters of the UDD, were rallied, heading to Pattaya before dawn. Major roads, the gates to Pattaya were blocked. Violent clashes occurred between the UDD and government supporters wearing dark blue T-shirts in the afternoon as the protesters were heading to the site of the summit. There were reports of blue-shirts throwing bombs at the UDD. Since the police failed to halt the rallies, the masses eventually stormed the hotel, the summit building.

The protests caused the ASEAN summit to be cancelled. The security force escorted the foreign leaders, leaving from the hotel by the navy ships and helicopters. The prime minister Abhisit therefore declared a state of emergency in the areas of Pattaya and Chonburi. The protest eventually ended in the afternoon.

=== 12 April ===
Protesters returned to Bangkok after Arisman Pongreungrong, the protest leader was detained by the police for causing the cancellation of the ASEAN summit.

Suporn Attawong and protesters attempted on the Prime Minister's life and injured his secretary general, Niphon Promphan, and Promphan's driver.

=== 13 April ===
Thai soldiers in full combat kit fired live rounds and training rounds from automatic weapons to clear protesters from the Din Daeng intersection near the Victory Monument in central Bangkok, injuring at least 70 people. The Army later claimed that live rounds were only fired into the air while training rounds were fired at the crowd. Human Rights Watch confirmed that there are some cases where the Army fired live ammunition directly at protesters. Also on 13 April, Sean Boonpracong, the UDD's official international spokesman, gave a phone interview to Al-Jazeera English, admitting that some UDD protesters used hand guns during street protests though he claimed that the guns are used in defence of the military crackdown. The UDD claimed one protester injured from gunshot wounds sustained during the military's attack. However, the Army later claimed that the wound was not caused by an M-16, the standard Army rifle. Also on Monday the government ordered the blocking of satellite news station D Station, an affiliate of the UDD which, at the time, was broadcasting the clashes. Several UDD community radio stations were shut down and searched upon suspicion of being supporters of the UDD. Violent clashes at numerous locations in Bangkok continued while arrest warrants were issued for Thaksin and 13 protest leaders.

=== 14 April ===
Surrounded by the military, many protesters eventually gave in on 14 April 2009, ending the violence. As the troops encircled the major location of the demonstration, near the Government House, demonstrators agreed to end their activity. The government confirmed the peaceful measure towards the protesters, free transport were provided for taking the protesters back to their home in the provinces. The demonstration ended 'officially' and peacefully in around noon time.

== Aftermath ==
According to government figures, over 120 people were injured in the unrest, most of them UDD demonstrators. At least one UDD protester injured from gunshot wounds sustained during the military's attack in Din Daeng, although the Army claimed the wound was not caused by their standard firearm. The UDD claimed that at least 6 demonstrators were killed in the unrest and their bodies hauled away by the military, although the Army rejected the claim. The dead bodies of 2 UDD protesters were found floating in the Chao Phraya River, their hands tied behind their backs and their bodies badly beaten, although police had yet to conclude whether their murders were politically motivated. On 11 September 2009, The House-appointed committee in charge of investigating the unrest has completed its report saying no death inflicted by crowd control.

Abhisit aide Satit Wongnontaey claimed that Red-shirted protesters shot a person dead and injured two others when residents of the Nang Lerng Market came out to criticise the protesters. The Bangkok Metropolitan Administration estimated that it had incurred 10 million Baht (approximately US$300,000) in property damages, including 31 damaged and burned buses. But, the Federation of Thai Tourism Industry estimated that the damage to the tourism industry could be as high as 200 billion Baht and resulting in 257,000 jobs lost.

== See also ==
- Constitution of Thailand
- 1973 Thai popular uprising
- 1976 Thammasat University massacre
- 2005–06 Thai political crisis
- 2006 Thai coup d'état
- Public opinion of the 2006 Thai coup d'état
- 2008 Thai political crisis
- 2010 Thai political protests
- 2010 Thai military crackdown
- 2013–2014 Thai political crisis
- 2014 Thai coup d'état
- 2014 interim constitution of Thailand
- 2019 Thai general election
