= Nattawut Saikua =

Thai politician and activist (born 1975)

- ณัฐวุฒิ ใสยเกื้อ
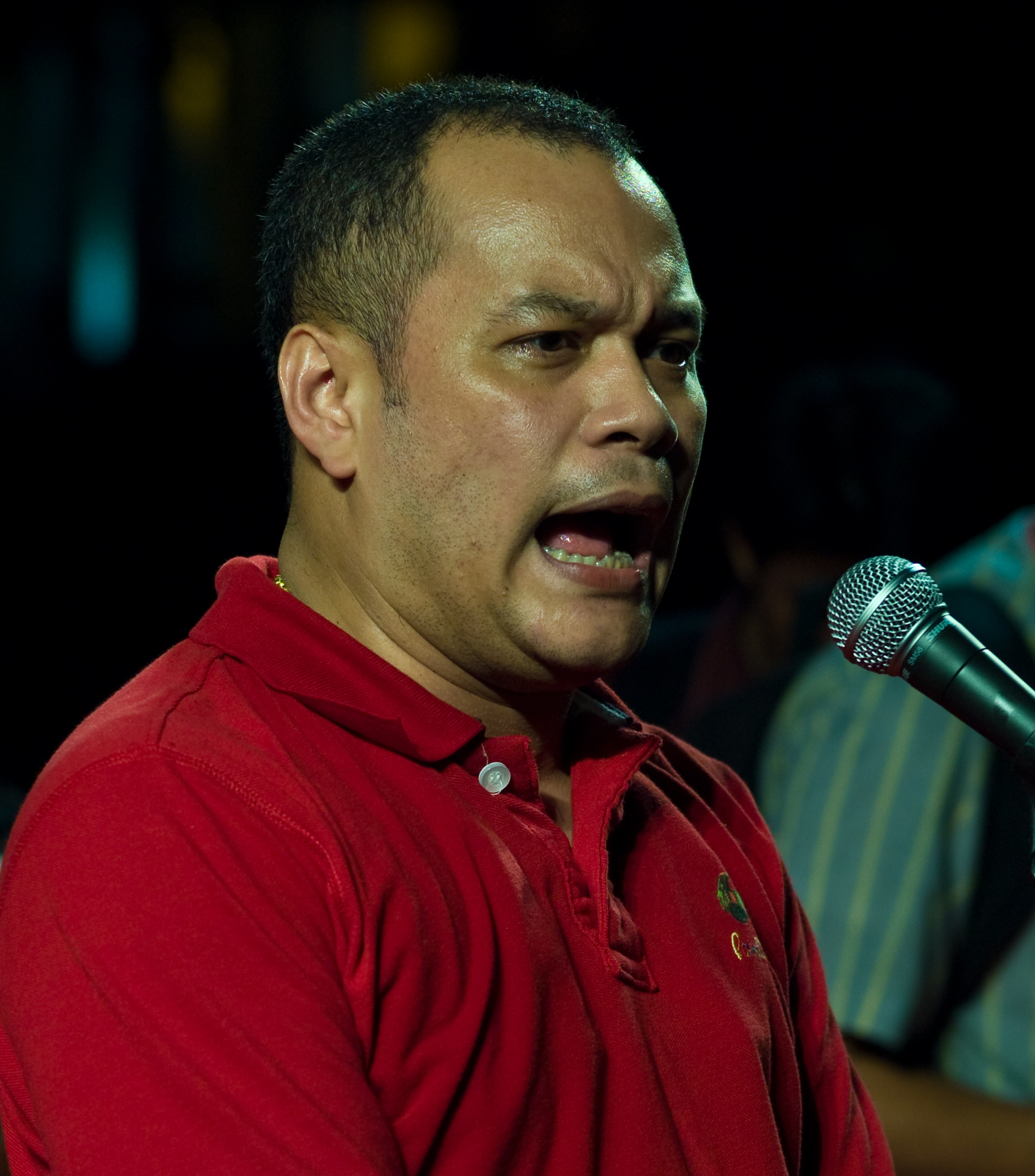
- Nattawut Saikua addressing a UDD rally in Bangkok on 13 March 2010

Deputy Minister of Commerce
- In office 28 October 2012 – 22 May 2014
- Prime Minister: Yingluck Shinawatra
- Preceded by: Poom Sarapol; Siriwat Kachornprasart
- Succeeded by: Apiradi Tantraporn

Deputy Minister of Agriculture and Cooperatives
- In office 18 January 2012 – 28 October 2012
- Prime Minister: Yingluck Shinawatra
- Preceded by: Pornsak Charoenprasert
- Succeeded by: Siriwat Kachornprasart; Yuttapong Charasathien

Secretary-General of the United Front for Democracy Against Dictatorship
- Incumbent
- Assumed office 2006
- President: Veera Musikapong; Thida Thavornseth

Government spokesperson
- In office 7 October 2008 – 17 December 2008
- Prime Minister: Somchai Wongsawat
- Preceded by: Wichianchote Sukchotra
- Succeeded by: Panitan Wattanayagorn

Personal details
- Born: 4 June 1975 (age 51) Sichon, Nakhon Si Thammarat, Thailand
- Party: Pheu Thai (2022–present)
- Other political affiliations: Thai Raksa Chart (2018–2019); Pheu Thai (2008–2018); People's Power (2007–2008); United Front for Democracy Against Dictatorship (UDD or "red shirts") (2006–present); Thai Rak Thai (2004–2007); National Development (2000–2004)
- Spouse: Sirisakul Saikua
- Children: Napok Saikua; Chard-aporn Saikua
- Education: Dhurakij Pundit University; NIDA
- Occupation: Politician; political activist; spokesman; MC

Nattawut Saikua (Thai: ณัฐวุฒิ ใสยเกื้อ; RTGS: Natthawut Sai-kuea; born 4 June 1975) is a Thai politician and political activist. He is the secretary-general and spokesman of the United Front for Democracy Against Dictatorship ("Red Shirts"), and a Member of Parliament for the Pheu Thai Party list. In 2008, he was spokesman for the Somchai Wongsawat government. From January 2012 to May 2014, he served as Deputy Minister in Yingluck Shinawatra's cabinet.

== Education and family ==
Nattawut was born in Sichon District, Nakhon Si Thammarat Province. He has one older brother, Jettanan. Nattawut studied communication studies at the Dhurakij Pundit University, where he graduated with a bachelor's degree in 1998. Later, he attended the Master of Public and Private Management programme of the National Institute of Development Administration, graduating in 2005. He is married to Sirisakul Saikua, and they have one son and one daughter.

== Orator and TV personality ==
Nattawut has a reputation as a stirring orator. Already as a high school student, he successfully participated in debating contests, including an appearance on Thai TV Channel 3. Later, he worked as a speech trainer. Nattawut gained fame on the Thai television program Sapa Joke ("Joke Parliament") on iTV, a show that travestied Thai parliament and politics. He "dubbed" Trairong Suwankiri, who was the deputy leader of the Democrat Party.

== Political career and activism ==
Nattawut joined the National Development Party in 2001 and moved to the Thai Rak Thai Party (TRT) of Prime Minister Thaksin Shinawatra in 2005. Inside TRT, he formed a faction together with his "buddies" and political allies Jatuporn Prompan and Veera Musikapong. After the overthrow of Thaksin and the forced dissolution of TRT, he represented the People's Power Party in the 2007 Thai elections. He became Deputy Spokesman for the Samak Sundaravej government on February 6, 2008. On October 7, 2008, he became the spokesman for the Somchai Wongsawat government.

Nattawut, alongside Jatuporn and Veera, is one of the leaders of the United Front of Democracy Against Dictatorship (UDD), colloquially called the "Red Shirts". The UDD is a political pressure group that campaigned and fiercely protested against the 2006 Thai coup d'état, which overthrew the government of Thaksin Shinawatra, against the military-installed government and the government of Abhisit Vejjajiva. Nattawut and his friends had a role in the initiation of the pro-Thaksin PTV channel. Moreover, they hosted the political talkshow Truth Today.

Nattawut co-organised the mass protests in 2009 and, together with the other UDD heads, led the "Red Shirts" in the fierce protests from March to May 2010 that led to the bloody military crackdowns of April and May. Nattawut, Jatuporn Prompan and other Red-Shirt leaders surrendered themselves to police to prevent further bloodshed during the violent military crackdown on 19 May 2010. Afterwards, Nattawut was prosecuted on terrorism charges. He was released on bail terms on 22 February 2011.

At the 2011 Thai general election Nattawut Saikua was elected Member of Parliament on the winning Pheu Thai Party list. When Prime Minister Yingluck Shinawatra reshuffled her cabinet on 18 January 2012, Nattawut was named Deputy Minister of Agriculture and Cooperatives. After the Cabinet reshuffle on 28 October 2012, he changed to the Ministry of Commerce. He lost his government office during the coup d'état on 22 May 2014. After the coup, he was held in military detention for seven days, alongside other "Red Shirt" leaders.

== Controversies ==
In a 2010 speech, Nattawut insinuated that Jarungjit Thikara, a lady-in-waiting of Queen Sirikit, ordered the army to crack down on the 2010 protests on the queen's behalf.

On 22 June 2013, a music video surfaced on YouTube featuring Nattawut singing about and promoting local grocery stores. The video received harsh criticism, with some viewers stating it was a waste of government spending.
