= Kokaew Pikulthong =

Thai politician (born 1965)

- ก่อแก้ว พิกุลทอง
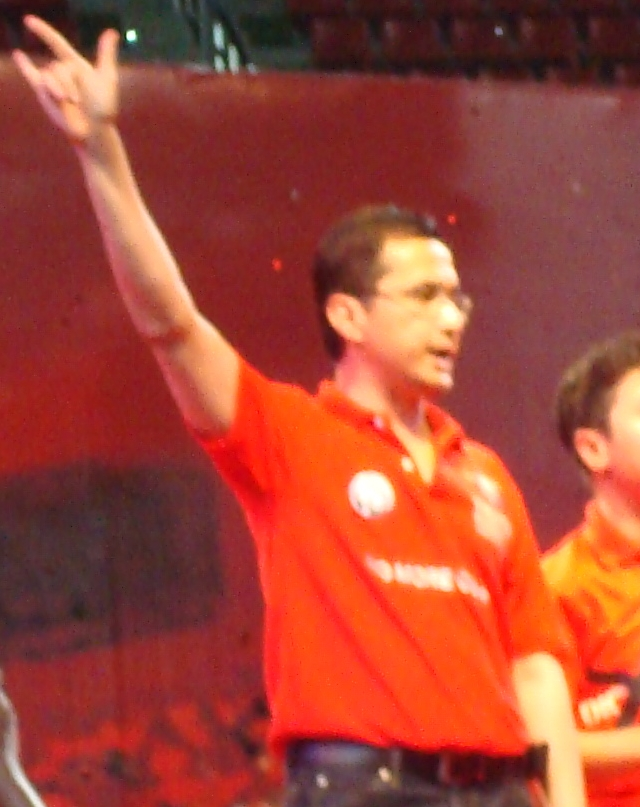
- Kokaew on UDD stage at Rajamangala Stadium in 2008
- Born: October 5, 1965; Phang Nga, Thailand
- Education: Bangkok University
- Occupations: Politician; political activist
- Years active: 2010–present
- Political party: Pheu Thai Party

Kokaew Pikulthong (Thai: ก่อแก้ว พิกุลทอง, RTGS: Kokaeo Phikunthong; born March 27, 1965) is a Thai politician.

Kokaew was born at Amphoe Takua Thung, Phang Nga. He is the son of Ti and Sin Pikulthong. He attended King Mongkut's Institute of Technology Ladkrabang and Bangkok University.

As of June 2010, he was a member of the Pheu Thai Party, and a leader of the National United Front of Democracy Against Dictatorship. On August 1, 2014, he demanded that Prayuth Chan-ocha would halt military curfew and charge them according to war tribunal laws, since the army have arrested 26 people in connection with the August 2014 bloodless coup in Khon Kaen.

== See also ==
- Truth Today
