= Weng Tojirakarn =

Thai physician and political activist

- เหวง โตจิราการ
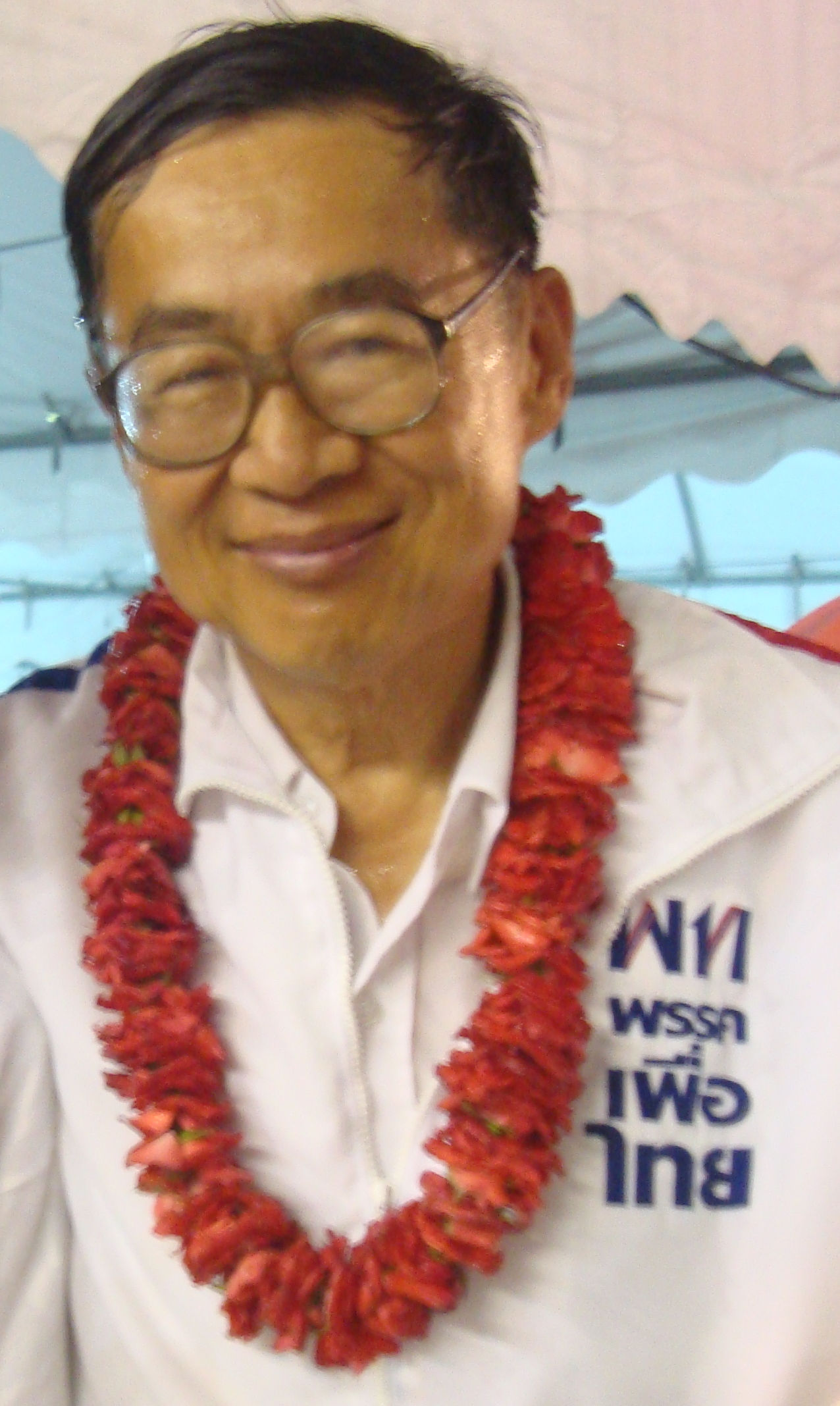
- Weng Tojirakarn at a Pheu Thai rally in 2011
- Born: 1 April 1951 (age 75); Thailand
- Education: Mahidol University (MD)
- Occupations: Physician; politician
- Political party: Pheu Thai Party
- Spouse: Thida Thavornseth

Weng Tojirakarn (Thai: เหวง โตจิราการ, RTGS: Weng Tochirakan, Thai pronunciation: [wěːŋ toːt͡ɕìʔraːkaːn]; born 1 April 1951) is a Thai medical doctor and politician. He is an activist of the United Front for Democracy Against Dictatorship (UDD), colloquially known as "Red Shirts" and since 2011 a member of parliament for the Pheu Thai Party.

== Life and political activism ==
=== Youth and activity in the democracy movement ===
Born into a family of poor Chinese immigrants, Weng Tojirakarn was admitted to the prestigious Triam Udom Suksa School for his outstanding intelligence. He studied at the Faculty of Medicine Ramathibodi Hospital, Mahidol University and was the secretary-general of the Medical Students Centre of Thailand. Weng considered himself a disciple of the Buddhist monk Buddhadasa Bhikku and thinks that the influence of Buddhadasa's teachings has motivated him to his political and social activism. He participated in the pro-democracy uprising in October 1973 and the student protests in 1976 that led to the Thammasat University massacre and the return to military rule.

Like other radical intellectuals, Weng and his wife, the microbiologist and pharmacist Asst. Prof.Thida Thavornseth, joined the illegal Communist Party of Thailand and fled to their camps in the jungle. During the following six years, Weng was part of the Communists' medical unit that cured wounded comrades. After the defeat of the Communists, he returned to Bangkok. In 1992, he joined the protests against the military-installed government of Suchinda Kraprayoon, that are recalled as the Black May. He co-founded the Confederation for Democracy.

=== Opposition against Thaksin ===
Weng opposed the administration of prime minister Thaksin Shinawatra. In particular, he criticised the "custom-tailored" law that allowed Thaksin and his family to sell multi-billion baht shares of their company Shin Corp to investors from Singapore without paying taxes. He joined the citizens' movement against Thaksin alongside Chamlong Srimuang who had already been the spokesman of the democracy movement of 1992. The anti-Thaksin movement became the People's Alliance for Democracy (PAD), commonly known as "Yellow Shirts", but Weng became increasingly alienated from the demands of his political friends. He finally broke with the PAD when they called for a new prime minister appointed by the king (which was rejected by the king as undemocratic), or military intervention. Weng perceived demands like these as undemocratic and accused the "Yellow Shirts" of developing in a neo-Nazi-like, selfish, corrupt and terrorist direction.

=== Activism in the UDD ===
After the 2006 Thai coup d'état that ousted Prime Minister Thaksin and installed a military-backed government, Weng joined the opposite political camp, the pro-Thaksin "Red Shirts". After the fierce "Red Shirts" protests against the government from March to May 2010, and the bloody military crackdowns in April and May, Weng, alongside other Red Shirt leaders, surrendered to the police on 18 May and was arrested. On 1 December 2010, his wife Thida was made chairwoman of the UDD. Weng was released on bail terms on 22 February 2011. He was elected member of parliament on the winning Pheu Thai Party list in the 2011 election.

In 2014 he asserted that Kamol Duangphasuk, a well known Thai poet and activist who was killed in his own car, was assassinated.
