= Truth Today =

- Truth Today's logo
- Country of origin: Thailand
- Original language: Thai

Production
- Running time: 45 minutes

Original release
- Release: 2008

Truth Today (Thai: ความจริงวันนี้, romanized: Kwamjing Wannee) is a Thai political talk show hosted by Veera Musikapong, Jatuporn Prompan and Nattawut Sai-kua. The talkshow began in 2008 during the Samak Sundaravej government on the National Broadcasting Services of Thailand TV station. After Abhisit Vejjajiva was appointed prime minister, the talkshow was banned by emergency decree. In 2009, D-Station began airing the talkshow again.

== See also ==
- National United Front of Democracy Against Dictatorship
