= Somsak Jaikaew =

Thai politician (1959–2021)

Somsak Jaikaew (Thai: สมศักดิ์ ใจแคล้ว) (5 January 1959 – 28 August 2021) was a Thai politician.

From 2011 to 2019, he served as a member of the House of Representatives of Thailand representing the Pheu Thai Party.

Jaikaew died from COVID-19 in 2021, aged 62.
