= 2011 Thai general election =

- 3 July 2011

All 500 seats in the House of Representatives 251 seats needed for a majority
- Registered: 46,939,549
- Turnout: 75.03% (▲2.63pp)
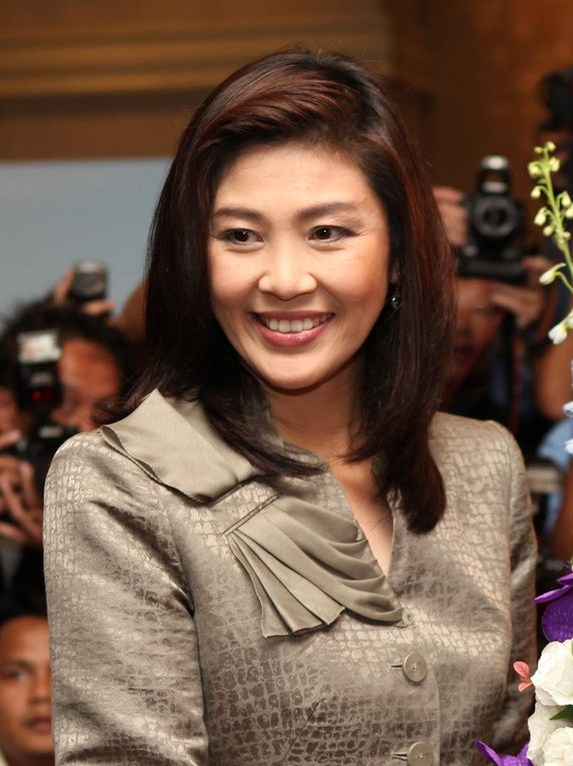

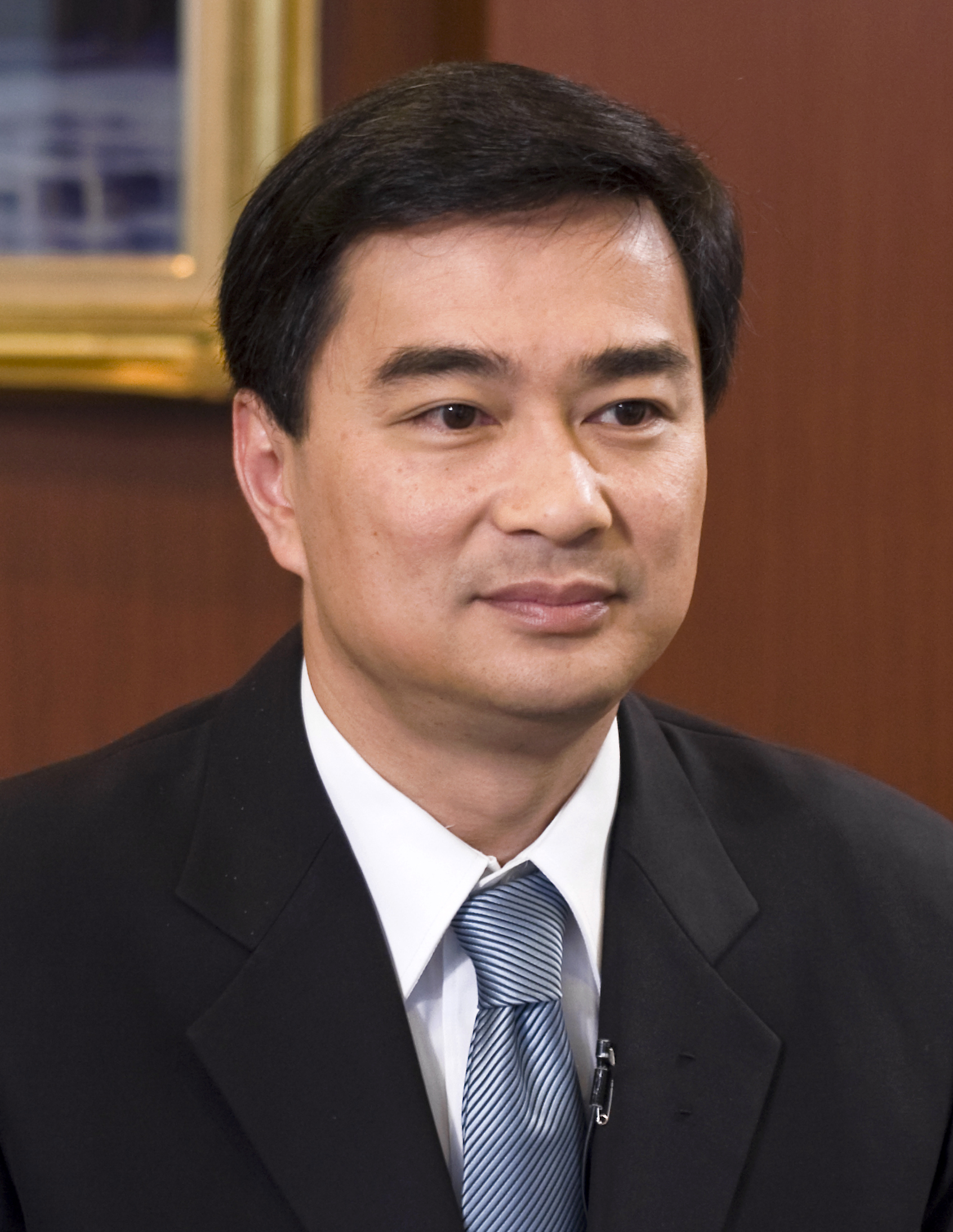

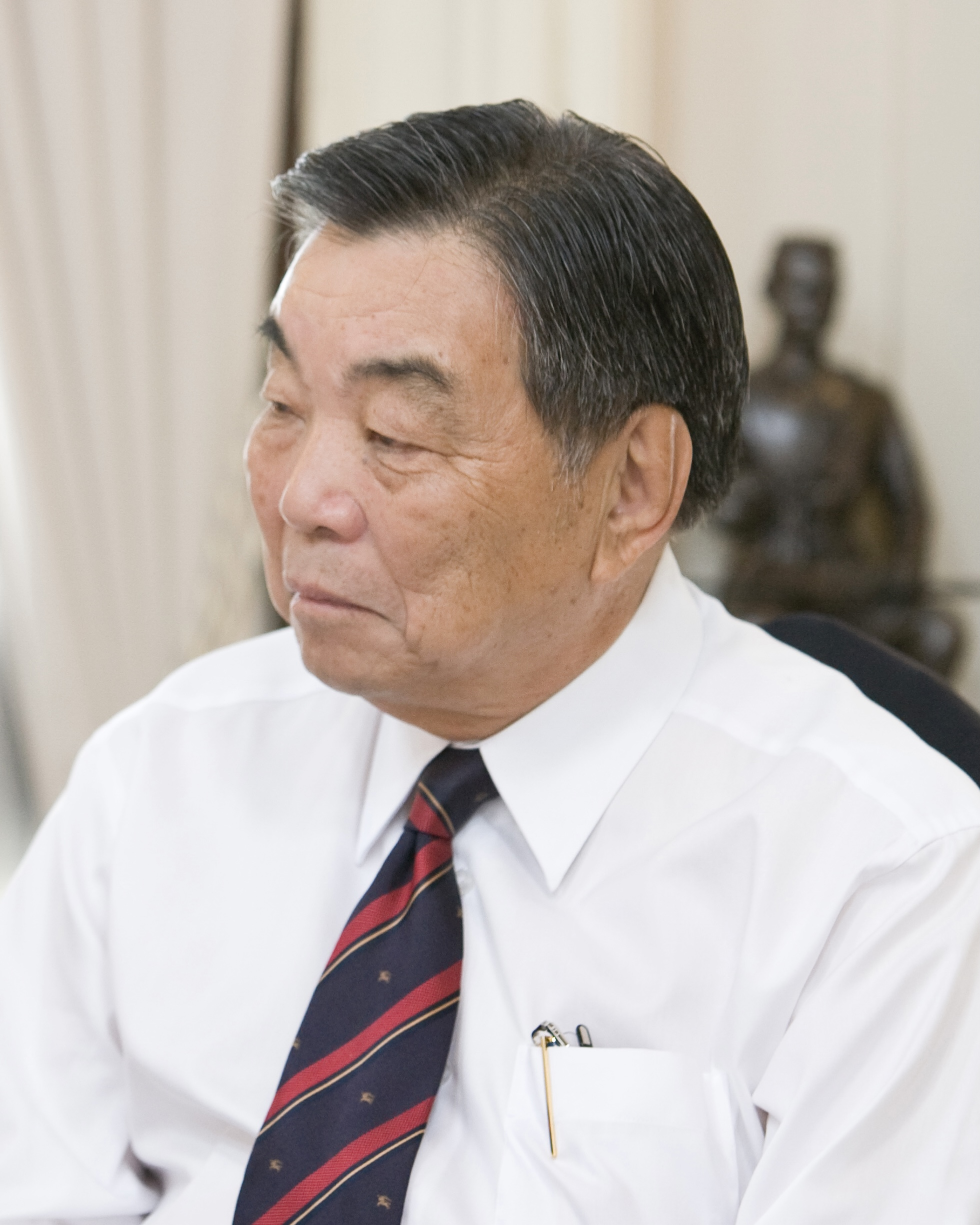

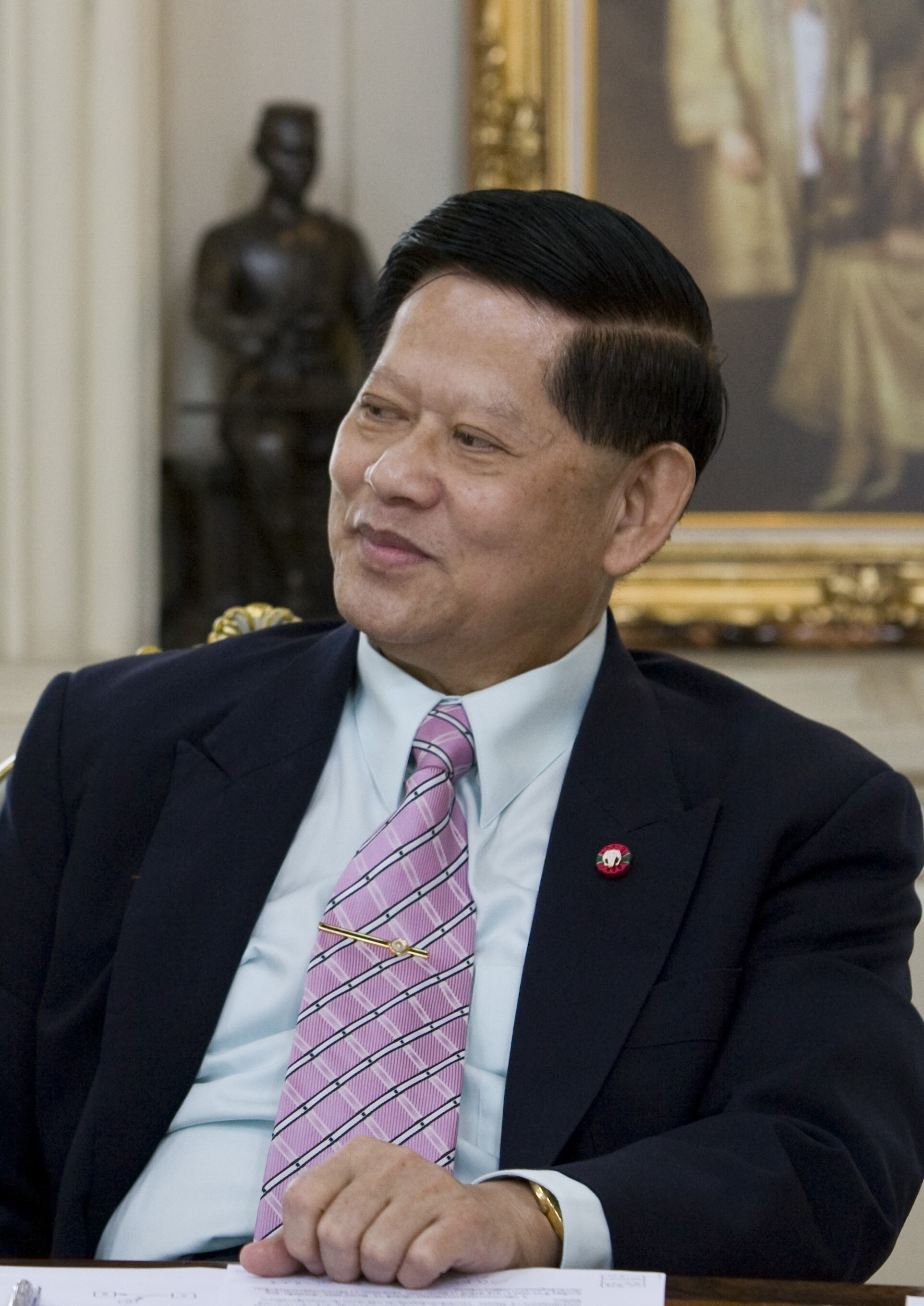
	First party	Second party
Leader	Yingluck Shinawatra	Abhisit Vejjajiva
Party	Pheu Thai	Democrat
Last election	233 seats (Note: As People's Power Party)	164 seats
Seats won	265	159
Seat change	▲32	▼5
Constituency vote	14,272,771	10,138,045
% and swing	43.02% (▲6.93pp)	30.55% (▲0.94pp)
Party-list vote	15,752,470	11,435,640
% and swing	47.03% (▲7.19pp)	34.14% (▼5.09pp)
	Third party	Fourth party
Leader	Chavarat Charnvirakul	Chumpol Silpa-archa
Party	Bhumjaithai	Chart Thai Pattana
Last election	–	34 seats
Seats won	34	19
Seat change	New	▼15
Constituency vote	3,523,331	1,534,027
% and swing	10.62% (New)	4.62% (▼4.06pp)
Party-list vote	1,281,652	907,106
% and swing	3.83% (New)	2.71% (▼6.37pp)
- Results by constituency
Prime Minister before election
Abhisit Vejjajiva
Democrat
Prime Minister-designate
Yingluck Shinawatra
Pheu Thai

General elections were held in Thailand on 3 July 2011 to elect the 24th House of Representatives.

The protestors of the United Front for Democracy Against Dictatorship (UDD) or "Red Shirts" who occupied downtown Bangkok in April and May 2010 had demanded new elections. The government's counter-proposal to hold elections on 14 November 2010 was rejected by them and was followed by a violent crackdown when the protestors refused to disperse. Elections were finally announced in May 2011.

With a turnout of 75%, populist Pheu Thai Party won a majority with 265 seats. Its leader Yingluck Shinawatra became the first female prime minister in the history of Thailand. The Democrat Party therefore became the main opposition party with a total of 159 seats.

The election results were acknowledged on 27 July after the Election Commission dealt with a number of objections regarding alleged irregularities. Reelections and recount were ordered to be held in several provinces, due to electoral fraud discovered by the commission. The first session of the National Assembly was convoked on Monday, 1 August at Ananta Samakhom Throne Hall and its state opening was held at the same time.

Following the victory by Pheu Thai Party, several countries, including Germany and Japan, lifted the ban that had once been imposed upon Thaksin Shinawatra, a convicted felon in Thailand.

== Background ==
After the 2007 Thai general election, the People’s Power Party won a majority of seats in the parliament and became the leading party to set up the new government. Samak Sundaravej, party leader, became the 25th Prime Minister of Thailand. This election victory led to a series of political demonstrations by the royalist Peoples Alliance for Democracy ("Yellow Shirts").

On 2 December 2008 the People’s Power Party had been dissolved by the Constitutional Court over vote buying. The PPP's executive team was banned from politics for 5 years. After the party's dissolution, all of the party's members of parliament had to join another party if they wished to retain their seat. The majority of them transferred to the newly founded Pheu Thai Party. Some representatives defected to the Democrats, which enabled the Democrat Party leader Abhisit Vejjajiva to be elected by parliament as prime minister.

The National United Front of Democracy Against Dictatorship ("Red Shirts") was a pressure group that opposed the Thai military's alleged influence in the formation of Abhisit's government. It promptly organised several rounds of protests and calls for general elections. Abhisit government finally ordered the military to crack down on the Red Shirts in 2009, resulting in several deaths and hundreds of injuries on both sides.

The Red Shirts launched a new round of protests in mid-2010, again demanding new elections. The 14 March protest, centered around Phan Fah bridge, were the largest in Thai history and were mostly peaceful. In April and May 2010 heavy Red Shirt protests led to violent clashes and the military cracked down on the protest camp in the heart of Bangkok from 13 to 19 May 2010.

Abhisit government's had passed several major amendments on electoral laws on 11 February 2011, transforming the constituency vote from multiple-seats-per-constituency to single-seat-per-constituency, reducing the number of constituency MPs, and increasing the proportional party list MPs. In the previous general elections in 2007, the Democrat Party had lost the constituency vote but won the proportional party list vote.

On 17 February 2011 Prime Minister Abhisit announced that parliament would be dissolved by June. On 11 March 2011, it was further announced that parliament would be dissolved by the first week of May 2011.

== Election date ==
Previously a proposal had made to hold the election on 14 November 2010, however, this was pushed back following a failure to come to agreement during the crisis.

On 9 May Prime Minister Abhisit Vejjajiva announced that he would dissolve the lower house of parliament to hold an election on 3 July. King Bhumibol Adulyadej signed a royal decree on the dissolution the same day. This motion followed a court ruling the same day that the recently approved electoral laws (to 2007 Constitution §§93–98 involving method of electing members of parliament) are constitutional. Had parliament been dissolved without the ruling, there would have been a possibility of challenging the election date.

== Contesting parties ==
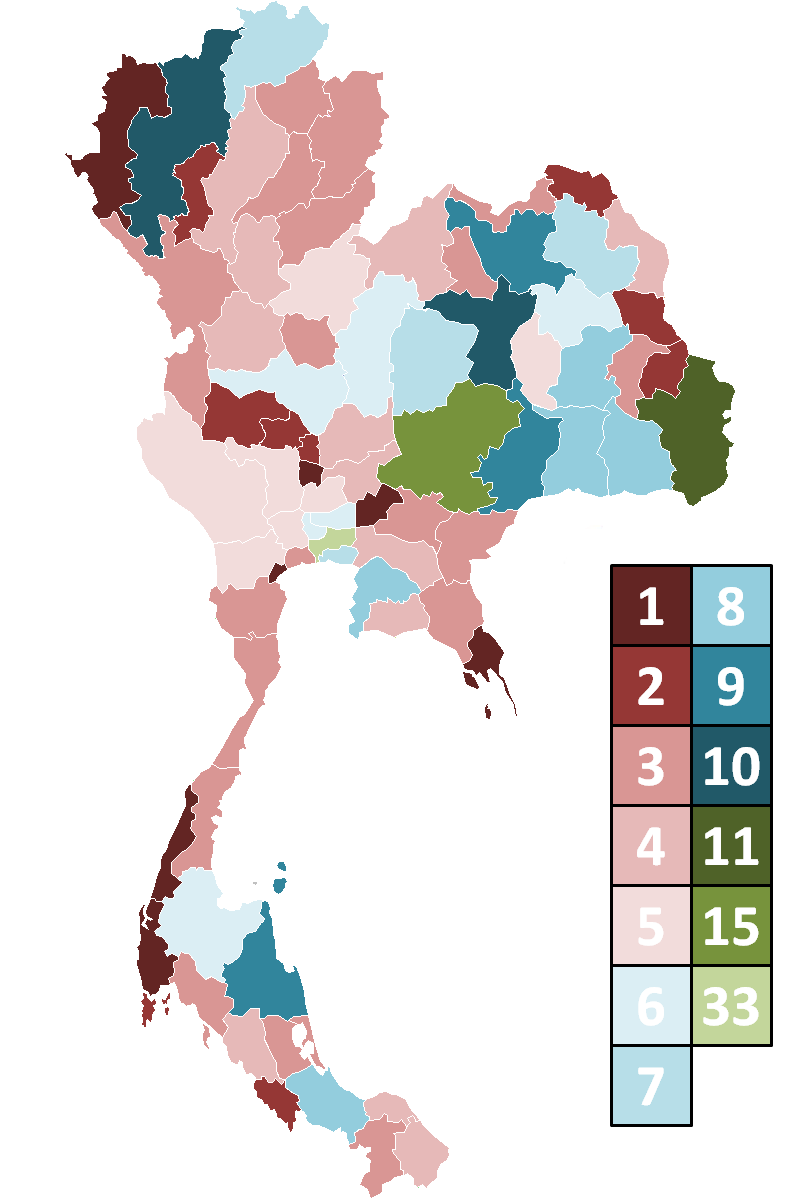
Appropriation of constituency seats by province

This election covered 375 single-member constituencies, and 125 under proportional party lists. After registration closed, party leaders participated in a random drawing of the number determining the order in which their parties appear on ballots, numbers which are also used in nationwide campaigning. Yingluck Shinawatra received a major psychological boost when her Pheu Thai party drew the number one; sitting prime minister Abhisit Vejjajiva's Democrat Party drew number ten.

Represented number	Party's name
1	Pheu Thai Party*
2	Chart Pattana Puea Pandin Party*
3	New Democracy Party
4	Thai Citizen Party
5	Rak Thailand Party
6	Phalang Chon Party
7	Prachatham Party
8	Dumrongthai Party
9	Mass Power Party
10	Democrat Party*
11	Thai Por-Pieng Party
12	Rak Santi Party
13	Thaipensuk Party
14	Social Action Party*
15	Thai Pen Thai Party
16	Bhumjaithai Party*
17	Thaen Khun Phaendin Party
18	For Heaven and Earth Party
19	The Farmer Network of Thailand Party
20	New Politics Party

Represented number	Parties name
21	Chartthaipattana Party*
22	Liberal Party
23	Chart Samuccee Party
24	Bamrungmueang Party
25	Kasikornthai Party
26	Matubhum Party
27	Better Life Party
28	Palung Sungkom Thai Party
29	Thai Party for Thai People
30	Mahachon Party
31	Prachachon Chow Thai Party
32	Rakpandin Party
33	Civil Peace Party
34	New Aspiration Party*
35	Asamatupoom Party
36	Sport Party of Thailand
37	Parung Chownathai Party
38	Thai Sangsun Party
39	Puen Kaset Thai Party
40	Maharatpattana Party

* Sent 125 candidates for all party-list seats

== Campaign issues ==
After the drawing, the Election Commission of Thailand distributed handouts nationwide, listing all registered parties by number, name and logo; each party's list of candidates and party platform; modified for each district with campaign portraits of their candidates, again in numerical order. Local campaigners add party numbers to pre-printed campaign posters, or print new ones. In most cases, the numbers are in Red, but in the latter part of the campaign, the Democrat Party (10) changed theirs to Green.

=== Thaksin and the monarchy ===
The Democrat Party promised that with their rule all Thais would live "under the same sky" with all groups being served fairly, whereas a Pheu Thai victory would result in "mob rule" in which social division and violence would spread and some groups could stand above the law. Abhisit referred to former prime minister Thaksin Shinawatra as a poison that had to be detoxified. The Democrats have repeatedly accused Thaksin and the Pheu Thai Party of disloyalty to King Bhumibol.

=== Alliances ===
The parties Bhumjaithai and Chartthaipattana formed a pre-campaign electoral alliance pledging to support whichever party won. The parties were members of Abhisit's coalition.

=== Jailing of opposition leaders ===
Red Shirt leaders Jatuporn Prompan and Nisit Sinthuprai had been jailed for months on charges of violating national security and insulting King Bhumibol following the 2010 crackdown on the Red Shirts. They had been released on bail, but the bail was revoked immediately after Abhisit announced the 2011 elections. They were not allowed to vote in the elections.

=== Celebrities and political heirs ===
Abhisit unveiled a slate of candidates highlighted by 30 celebrities and heirs of political families, including Chitpas Bhirombhakdi, heiress of the Singha Beer fortune and former staff member of Abhisit's secretariat office. She had earlier resigned after she was caught handing out nude calendars to secretariat office staff.

The Chartthaipattana fielded four sports celebrities as candidates: former national team football player Piyapong Pue-on, tennis player Paradorn Srichaphan, Olympic taekwondo bronze medallist Yaowapa Boorapolchai, and former rugby player Apirak Areemitr.

=== Minimum wage ===
Abhisit promised to increase the minimum wage by 25% if the Democrat Party won the election.

The Pheu Thai Party promised to increase the minimum wage to 300 baht per day. Abhisit had promised to raise the minimum wage to 300 baht prior to the elections, but changed his mind after pressure from employers.

=== Angry Man ===
Rak Thailand Party of Chuwit Kamolvisit conducted a vigorous "Angry Man" campaign pledging to be in opposition to whichever party won.

=== NO campaign ===
For Heaven and Earth Party (political arm of the Santi Asoke Buddhist sect) supported the NO campaign of some PAD supporters, which featured proverbial animals in color-coded suits as non-human electoral candidates, most bearing the slogan: Don’t let animals enter parliament (อย่าปล่อยสัตว์เข้าสภา). Also prominent: Flee (หนี...) (blue-suited tiger) For (ปะ...) (red-suited crocodile). Chamlong Srimuang, a key supporter of the "vote-no" movement, did not vote "no" after all. In fact, he did not vote at all; his and his wife’s names were not on the list of eligible voters as they had voted in advance in the previous election but did not realise that they had to inform election officials that they did not want to do so in this one.

=== Other ===
Other PAD supporters, however, formed the New Politics Party whose logo is a yellow sauwastika under a Trairanga rainbow.

== Opinion polls ==
Results of a Suan Dusit Rajabhat University poll (4–18 June): Pheu Thai 51.55%; Democrat 34.04%; Bhum Jai Thai 3.43%; Rak Prathet Thai 2.48%; Chart Thai Pattana 1.60%; against all 1.41%; undecided 2.38%

23–28 May: Pheu Thai 43.16%; Democrat 37.45%; Bhum Jai Thai 2.64%; Chart Thai Pattana 2.46%; Rak Prathet Thai 1.43%; others 4.42%; undecided 7.08; rest would not vote – Democrats strongest in Southern Region (65.89%), Pheu Thai in Northern (73.17%)

19–22 May: Pheu Thai 41.22%; Democrat 36.88%; Bhum Jai Thai 3.88%; Chart Thai Pattana 3.20%; Rak Prathet Thai 1.59%

=== Preferred party-list ===
Fieldwork date(s)	Polling firm	Sample	Pheu Thai	Democrat	No party Undecided	Others	Lead
17-18 May 2011	Nida Poll	1,272	16.90	12.74	52.04	18.24	33.80
24-25 May 2011	Nida Poll	1,234	17.99	12.07	48.38	1.05	30.39
1-2 June 2011	Nida Poll	1,230	16.67	9.19	45.93	28.21	17.72
7-8 June 2011	Nida Poll	1,338	18.59	9.15	43.73	1.15	25.14

=== Preferred party ===
Fieldwork date(s)	Polling firm	Sample	Pheu Thai	Democrat	No party Undecided	Others	Lead
17-18 May 2011	Nida Poll	1,272	17.77	14.23	49.76	18.24	31.52
19-22 May 2011	Suan Dusit Poll	3,584	41.22	36.88	6.49	15.41	4.34
23-28 May 2011	Suan Dusit Poll	4,694	43.16	37.45	7.08	12.31	5.71
24-25 May 2011	Nida Poll	1,234	18.31	11.75	48.95	1.22	30.64
1-2 June 2011	Nida Poll	1,230	16.67	9.19	45.93	28.21	17.72
7-8 June 2011	Nida Poll	1,338	18.01	9.51	43.88	28.60	15.28
13 June 2011	Nida Poll	1,247	29.51	17.40	28.07	25.02	1.44
4-18 June 2011	Suan Dusit Poll	102,944	51.55	34.05	2.38	12.02	17.50

== Conduct ==
=== Violence ===
Pracha Prasopdee, ex-MP for Samut Prakan Province who had won all five of the previous elections, was shot in the back on the night of 10 May. Pracha had been a member of the Thai Rak Thai, Peoples Power, and Pheu Thai parties.

=== Overseas and early voting ===
In this election more eligible voters turned up to vote. The number of Thais registered to vote from abroad is 147,330, the equivalent of just over half the population of Mae Hong Son Province and soared from 90,205 in 2008 – in Singapore the figure has surpassed 10,000 while in the United Kingdom the number has doubled from 2,296 to 4,775. Early voting arranged on Sunday (26 June 2011) only while prior elections arranged on Saturday and Sunday. Around 2.6 million people, including 1.07 million in Bangkok turned up to vote; however, many potential voters were unable to vote due to large crowds.

== Results ==
Exit polls indicated that Pheu Thai had won the election outright, winning a majority of seats.

According to preliminary results Pheu Thai won 265 seats (204 constituency-based + 61 party-list), Democrats 159 (115 + 44), Bhumjai Thai 34 (29 + 5), Chartthaipattana 19 (15 + 4), Palung Chon 7 (6 + 1), Chart Pattana Puea Pandin 7 (5 + 2), Love Thailand 4 (all party-list), Matubhum 2 (1 + 1), New Democrat 1 (party-list) and Mahachon one party-list seat. Prime Minister Abhisit Vejjajiva has already conceded the victory of Puea Thai Party and congratulated Ms. Shinawatra as the designated Prime Minister.

According to preliminary figures from the Electoral Commission the voter turnout was at 65.99%.

Following the provisional results, Ms. Shinawatra said that "Puea Thai had already reached an agreement with one smaller party, Chart Thai Pattana, about joining a coalition, and was in negotiations with others."

Party	Party-list			Constituency			Total seats	+/–
Party	Votes	%	Seats	Votes	%	Seats	Total seats	+/–
Pheu Thai Party	15,752,470	47.03	61	14,272,771	43.02	204	265	+32
Democrat Party	11,435,640	34.14	44	10,138,045	30.55	115	159	–5
Bhumjaithai Party	1,281,652	3.83	5	3,523,331	10.62	29	34	New
Rak Thailand Party	998,668	2.98	4				4	New
Chartthaipattana Party	907,106	2.71	4	1,534,027	4.62	15	19	–15
Chart Pattana Puea Pandin Party	495,762	1.48	2	1,258,464	3.79	5	7	–26
Rak Santi Party	284,100	0.85	1	138,758	0.42	0	1	New
Matubhum Party	251,674	0.75	1	369,526	1.11	1	2	New
Phalang Chon Party	178,042	0.53	1	246,879	0.74	6	7	New
Mahachon Party	133,752	0.40	1				1	+1
New Democracy Party	125,753	0.38	1	992	0.00	0	1	New
Social Action Party	81,824	0.24	0	114,978	0.35	0	0	New
Thaen Khun Phaendin Party	57,801	0.17	0	2,336	0.01	0	0	New
Mass Power Party	57,793	0.17	0	4,290	0.01	0	0	New
Thai Por-Pieng Party	49,065	0.15	0	1,144	0.00	0	0	New
Sport Party of Thailand	39,778	0.12	0	13,148	0.04	0	0	New
Prachatham Party	38,748	0.12	0	26,229	0.08	0	0	New
Farmer Network of Thailand Party	36,931	0.11	0	20,133	0.06	0	0	0
Thai Citizen Party	35,475	0.11	0	3,728	0.01	0	0	0
New Politics Party	34,883	0.10	0	3,080	0.01	0	0	New
Liberal Party	34,111	0.10	0	2,791	0.01	0	0	New
Thai Pen Thai Party	27,193	0.08	0	1,897	0.01	0	0	0
Maharatpattana Party	22,221	0.07	0				0	New
New Aspiration Party	21,195	0.06	0	31,246	0.09	0	0	0
Puen Kasetthai Party	15,606	0.05	0	13,580	0.04	0	0	0
Thai Party for Thai People	15,071	0.04	0	734	0.00	0	0	New
Prachachon Chow Thai Party	13,010	0.04	0				0	New
Civil Peace Party	12,912	0.04	0	20,084	0.06	0	0	New
For Heaven and Earth Party	12,823	0.04	0	13,674	0.04	0	0	New
Dumrongthai Party	12,489	0.04	0	1,811	0.01	0	0	0
Kasikorn Thai Party	11,268	0.03	0				0	0
Chartsamuccee Party	9,601	0.03	0	1,041	0.00	0	0	0
Thaipensuk Party	9,132	0.03	0	1,561	0.00	0	0	New
Parung Chownathai Party	7,332	0.02	0	260	0.00	0	0	New
Better Life Party	6,882	0.02	0	92	0.00	0	0	New
Asamatupoom Party	6,692	0.02	0				0	New
Bamrungmueang Party	6,568	0.02	0				0	New
Rakpandin Party	6,501	0.02	0				0	New
Palung Sungkom Thai Party	4,861	0.01	0	91	0.00	0	0	New
Thai Sangsun Party	2,842	0.01	0	39	0.00	0	0	New
Thailand's Future				208	0.00	0	0	New
Blank votes	958,213	2.86	–	1,419,148	4.28	–	–	–
Total	33,493,440	100.00	125	33,180,116	100.00	375	500	+20
Valid votes	33,493,440	95.10		33,180,116	94.21			
Invalid votes	1,726,768	4.90		2,040,261	5.79			
Total votes	35,220,208	100.00		35,220,377	100.00			
Registered voters/turnout	46,939,549	75.03		46,939,549	75.03			
Source: Election Commission

=== Results by province ===
Province	Total seats	Seats won							
Province	Total seats	PTP	Dem	BJT	CT	PC	CPPPP	MB	Others
Amnat Charoen	2	1	1						
Ang Thong	2				2				
Bangkok	33	10	23						
Bueng Kan	2	2							
Buriram	9	2		7					
Chachoengsao	4	2	2						
Chai Nat	2			2					
Chaiyaphum	7	6		1					
Chanthaburi	3		3						
Chiang Mai	10	10							
Chiang Rai	7	7							
Chonburi	8	1	1			6			
Chumphon	3		3						
Kalasin	6	6							
Kamphaeng Phet	4	3	1						
Kanchanaburi	5	2	3						
Khon Kaen	10	10							
Krabi	3		3						
Lampang	4	4							
Lamphun	2	2							
Loei	4	4							
Lopburi	4	2		2					
Mae Hong Son	1		1						
Maha Sarakham	5	5							
Mukdahan	2	2							
Nakhon Nayok	1			1					
Nakhon Pathom	5	4			1				
Nakhon Phanom	4	4							
Nakhon Ratchasima	15	8		3			4		
Nakhon Sawan	6	4	1				1		
Nakhon Si Thammarat	9		9						
Nan	3	3							
Narathiwat	4		4						
Nong Bua Lamphu	3	3							
Nong Khai	3	3							
Nonthaburi	6	6							
Pathum Thani	6	6							
Pattani	4		2	1				1	
Phang Nga	1		1						
Phatthalung	3		3						
Phayao	3	3							
Phetchabun	6	5	1						
Phetchaburi	3		3						
Phichit	3		1		2				
Phitsanulok	5	2	3						
Phra Nakhon Si Ayutthaya	5	4			1				
Phrae	3	3							
Phuket	2		2						
Prachinburi	3			2	1				
Prachuap Khiri Khan	3		3						
Ranong	1		1						
Ratchaburi	5			4	1				
Rayong	4		4						
Roi Et	8	8							
Sa Kaeo	3	3							
Sakon Nakhon	7	7							
Samut Prakan	7	6		1					
Samut Sakhon	3	1	2						
Samut Songkhram	1		1						
Saraburi	4	2	1	1					
Satun	2		1		1				
Sing Buri	1	1							
Sisaket	8	7		1					
Songkhla	8		8						
Sukhothai	4		2	2					
Suphan Buri	5	1			4				
Surat Thani	6		6						
Surin	8	7		1					
Tak	3		3						
Trang	4		4						
Trat	1		1						
Ubon Ratchathani	11	7	3		1				
Udon Thani	9	9							
Uthai Thani	2		1		1				
Uttaradit	3	3							
Yala	3		3						
Yasothon	3	3							
Partylist	125	61	44	5	4	1	2	1	7
Total	500	265	159	34	19	7	7	2	7
Source: Election Commission (1, 2, 3, 4

Party-list Votes
Province	Pheu Thai		Democrat		Others		Total Votes
Province	Votes	%	Votes	%	Votes	%	Total Votes
Amnat Charoen	93,633	50.22	75,469	40.48	17,337	9.30	186,439
Ang Thong	80,738	52.22	27,330	17.68	46,552	30.11	154,620
Bangkok	1,209,508	42.26	1,277,669	44.64	374,794	13.10	2,861,971
Bueng Kan	154,937	80.41	9,251	4.80	28,505	14.79	192,693
Buriram	329,568	44.92	116,278	15.85	287,769	39.23	733,615
Chachoengsao	160,227	43.77	150,315	41.06	55,536	15.17	366,078
Chai Nat	82,374	44.37	60,617	32.65	42,673	22.98	185,664
Chaiyaphum	422,315	73.65	76,025	13.26	75,067	13.09	573,407
Chanthaburi	142,233	52.70	97,039	35.95	30,632	11.35	269,904
Chiang Mai	606,897	66.02	215,816	23.48	96,504	10.50	919,217
Chiang Rai	445,093	72.48	93,212	15.18	75,796	12.34	614,101
Chonburi	142,843	21.64	268,328	40.65	248,952	37.71	660,123
Chumphon	18,261	7.08	217,948	84.46	21,850	8.47	258,059

== Aftermath ==
=== Acknowledgement of election result ===
After the election was held on 3 July, the next procedure is that the Election Commission acknowledges the election result within thirty days from the election date in order that Abhisit Vejjajaiva, Caretaker Prime Minister, would enact a royal decree convoking the House of Representatives to have the new President of the House, Vice President of the House and Prime Minister selected respectively, and the President of the House would then advice and consent the King to appoint a new prime minister according to the resolution of the House.

The Election Commission met to consider the election result in the afternoon of 12 July. The meeting was held until nightfall. More than fifty Red-Shirt members gathered in front of the Election Commission Office awaiting the outcome, with strict control of the police officers. That night, three hundred and fifty candidates were acknowledged by the Election Commission as the members of the House, but not including Yingluck Shinawatra, Abhisit Vejjajiva and Nattawut Saikua by cause of a great number of objections pending consideration. The remainders, that is, one hundred and forty two elected candidates, are to be acknowledged by 20 July, said the Election Commission. Yingluck described the postponement as part of a "normal process" for the commission.

On 19 July, both Yingluck and Abhisit were acknowledged as the members of the House. On 27 July, the acknowledgement extended to further ninety four elected candidates. Now and eventually, the number acknowledged sufficed to constitute the House. This, however, did not include Jatuporn Prompan whom the Election Commission declared to have lost the suffrage due to failure to vote in both the previous and the present elections. The Constitution requires that a member of the House must possess the suffrage, and also prescribes that a person failing to vote in an election loses the suffrage but regains it once he votes in the next election.

The Election Commission's announcements of the acknowledgement were published in the Government Gazette as follows:

#	Announcements	Number of candidates acknowledged	Date of acknowledgement	Published in
Proportional
1	Announcement of the Election Commission, Re: Results of election of members of the House of Representatives on proportional basis, dated 12 July 2011	109	12 July 2011	Government Gazette: volume 128/part 58 A/page 6/21 July 2011
2	Announcement of the Election Commission, Re: Results of election of members of the House of Representatives on proportional basis (2nd group), dated 19 July 2011	2	19 July 2011	Government Gazette: volume 128/part 59 A/page 6/27 July 2011
3	Announcement of the Election Commission, Re: Results of election of members of the House of Representatives on proportional basis (3rd group), dated 21 July 2011	6	21 July 2011	Government Gazette: volume 128/part 59 A/page 11/27 July 2011
4	Announcement of the Election Commission, Re: Results of election of members of the House of Representatives on proportional basis (4th group), dated 27 July 2011	7	27 July 2011	Government Gazette: volume 128/part 60 A/page 10/28 July 2011
Constituency
5	Announcement of the Election Commission, Re: Results of election of members of the House of Representatives on constituency basis, dated 12 July 2011	249	12 July 2011	Government Gazette: volume 128/part 58 A/page 11/21 July 2011
6	Announcement of the Election Commission, Re: Results of election of members of the House of Representatives on constituency basis (2nd group), dated 19 July 2011	10	19 July 2011	Government Gazette: volume 128/part 59 A/page 4/27 July 2011
7	Announcement of the Election Commission, Re: Results of election of members of the House of Representatives on constituency basis (3rd group), dated 21 July 2011	26	21 July 2011	Government Gazette: volume 128/part 59 A/page 7/27 July 2011
8	Announcement of the Election Commission, Re: Results of election of members of the House of Representatives on constituency basis (4th group), dated 27 July 2011	87	27 July 2011	Government Gazette: volume 128/part 60 A/page 11/28 July 2011

=== Disqualifications ===
Five red cards were expected during balloting in Sukhothai Province, Chaiyaphum Province, Maha Sarakham Province, Sisaket Province and Buriram Province in reference to campaign fraud. There have been allegations of massive electoral fraud against third-place finisher Bhumjaithai Party that could potentially lead to the party dissolution by the Constitutional Court

On 21 July, the Election Commission ordered the re-elections to be held in Sukhothai province and Nong Khai Province. It also ordered a recount in Yala Province.

=== First sessions ===
Abhisit enacted on 29 July the Royal Decree Convoking the National Assembly, BE 2554 (2011), by which the National Assembly, both the House of Representatives and the Senate, convened on Monday, 1 August 2011 at Ananta Samakhom Throne Hall. The state ceremony of opening the National Assembly was presided over by Crown Prince Vajiralongkorn instead of his aged father who has been confined in hospital for so long. In this first joint session of the National Assembly, Somsak Kiatsuranont has been elected as the President of the House of Representatives (ex officio President of the National Assembly of Thailand); several other members have been selected as the Vice Presidents of the House. The first separate session of the House of Representatives was held in the morning of 5 August to select a new prime minister. In which 296 of the 500 members of parliament voted to approve the premiership of Yingluck Shinawatra, three disapproved, and 197 abstained. Four Democrat lawmakers were absent. Somsak Kiatsuranont, President of the National Assembly, advised and consented King Bhumibol Adulyadej to appoint Yingluck Prime Minister on 8 August. The Proclamation on her appointment has taken retroactive effect from 5 August.

Yingluck has set up her Council of Ministers on 9 August. She and her Ministers were sworn in on 10 August. They must then complete addressing their administrative policy to the National Assembly. According to the Constitution, the address must be made within fifteen days from the effective date of the Proclamation on Yingluck's appointment.

=== By-elections ===
By-elections were held to replace disqualified MPs. For Bangkok's 12th electoral district (which covered most of Don Mueang District, Pheu Thai MP Karun Hosakul was disqualified and banned for five years for defaming rival candidate Tankhun Jitt-itsara and the Democrat Party. A by-election was held to replace him. Tankhun Jitt-itsara re-ran as the Democrat candidate, while Yuranunt Pamornmontri, a party list MP, was chosen as Pheu Thai's candidate. He then resigned from his House seat on 27 May 2013 to run for the vacant seat. Tankhun won the by-election, resulting in a Democrat gain for the constituency.

== Reactions ==
On 4 July, Abhisit Vejjajiva stepped down as the leader of the Democrat Party, as he had promised in the case of a defeat of his party. The Chartthaipattana Party, Chart Pattana Puea Pandin Party, Phalang Chon Party and Mahachon Party agreed to join a coalition government led by the Pheu Thai Party which would have 299 seats in the new House of Representatives. Acting defense minister General Prawit Wongsuwan declared that the armed forces would accept the results and "allow politicians to work it out" without any interference, while the Commander-in-Chief of the Royal Thai Army, General Prayuth Chan-ocha, pledged not to make any comments during the process of government formation.

The Cambodian foreign minister Hor Namhong congratulated the winners of the election, stating "We cannot hide that we are happy with the Pheu Thai Party's victory" and expressed confidence that, under the new government, the Cambodian–Thai border dispute would be settled. Thai stock markets reacted positively at the news of the Pheu Thai victory, rising by 5% on the first trading day after the election. The markets viewed the Pheu Thai's strong mandate as an opportunity for short-term political stability.

On 10 July, Lamian Yusuk, an 80-year-old Rayong inhabitant and supporter of the Democrat Party, committed suicide by consuming herbicide after the party's poor performance. Many Democrat members of the House of Representatives attended her funeral. Abhisit, who did not attend, later offered condolences to Yusuk's relatives by phone. Yusuk's death attracted both positive and negative criticism of the deceased.

The Election Commission's eventual acknowledgment of election results caused the Thai stock market to be rise by 3.67 on 28 July. Stock market assistant director Thirada Chaiyuenyong said that the shares index for that day was quite strong, comparing to regional indexes. Many States, including Germany and Japan, also lifted the ban on entry which has been imposed on Thaksin Shinawatra during the regime of Abhisit.
