= For Heaven and Earth Party =

For Heaven and Earth Party พรรคเพื่อฟ้าดิน
- Leader: Mingmai Mungmachon
- Secretary-General: Nungfa Navabunniyom
- Founded: 5 April 2000
- Headquarters: Bangkok, Thailand

For Heaven and Earth Party (Thai: พรรคเพื่อฟ้าดิน) is a political party in Thailand founded on 5 April 2000. The party, founded by Nitiphumthanat Ming-rujiralai registered with the Election Commission of Thailand as the Cooperative Party on 5 April 2003. After Nitiphumthanat went abroad, Santi Asoke changed the name to what it is now.

== Election ==
Since the party was founded, they have not sent candidates to election until the 2011 Thai general election. In this election, the party sent 157 candidates for election as number 18, with one candidate for Party list and the remaining for Constituency.
