= Panitan Wattanayagorn =

Thai political scientist

- ปณิธาน วัฒนายากร
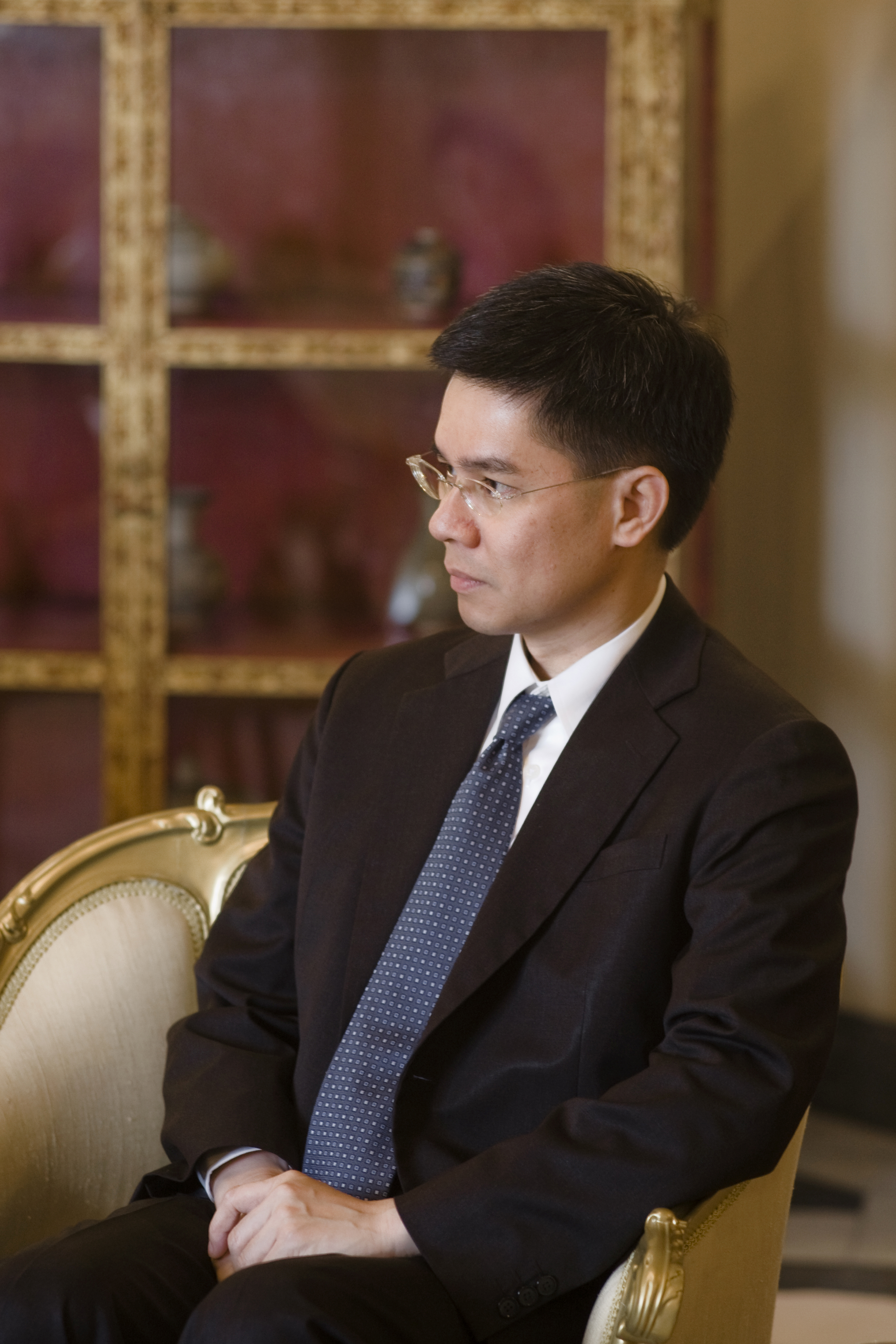
- Panitan Wattanayagorn in 2010

Deputy Secretary-General to the Prime Minister and Acting Government spokesperson
- In office 30 December 2008 – 31 July 2011
- Prime Minister: Abhisit Vejjajiva
- Preceded by: Nattawut Saikua
- Succeeded by: Thitima Chaisang

Personal details
- Born: 16 December 1960 (age 65) Yala, Thailand
- Spouse: Pimkarn Chanarath
- Children: Two sons
- Education: Northern Illinois University; University of Akron
- Occupation: Political scientist

Panitan Wattanayagorn (Thai: ปณิธาน วัฒนายากร, RTGS: Panithan Watthanayakon; born 16 December 1960) is a Thai political scientist and an associate professor in the Faculty of Political Science, Chulalongkorn University. He has held advisory and executive positions in government of Thailand administrations over the past two decades. He is Chairman of the Prime Minister's Security Advisory Committee and an adviser to the National Security Council and a member of Thailand's National Cyber Security Committee.

== Education ==
Panitan received his PhD in political science with specialization in comparative defense policy from Northern Illinois University. He holds an MA degree in urban studies from the University of Akron and a bachelor's degree in political science from Ramkhamhaeng University in Thailand.

== Career ==
Panitan began his career as a lecturer at the Department of International Relations in the Faculty of Political Science, Chulalongkorn University in 1993. He was Director of the Defense Studies Program at the Institute of Security and International Studies] (ISIS) in Bangkok from 1994 to 1996. In 1999, he was assistant professor and became an associate professor in 2004. In 2006, he was C.V. Starr Distinguished Visiting professor at the School of Advanced International Studies (SAIS), Johns Hopkins University. Between 2014 and 2018, he was Director of the College of Politics and Governance at King Prajadhipok's Institute.

== Political experience ==
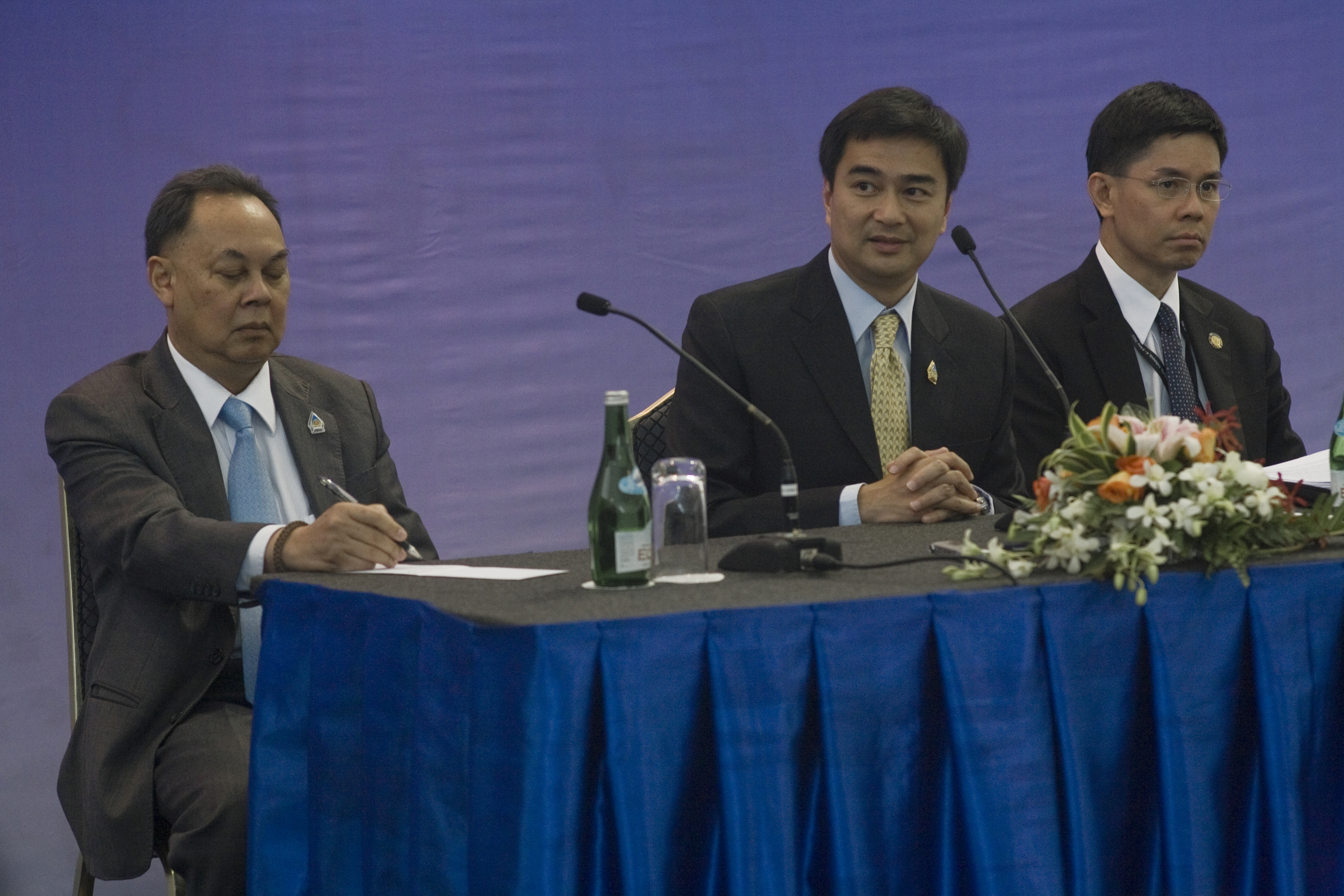
Panitan with Prime Minister Abhisit Vejjajiva and Foreign Minister Kasit Piromya

At the onset of the 1997 Asian financial crisis, Panitan was seconded from Chulalongkorn University to the Prime Minister's Office to work as Head of a Special Working-Group on Defense for the prime minister and Minister of Defense, Chuan Leekpai. He returned to the university in 2001. In 2005, he was appointed foreign affairs adviser to the Leader of the Opposition in the Thai Parliament by Abhisit Vejjajiva. Panitan was appointed a member of the Prime Minister's Eminent Persons Advisory Board during the premiership of General Surayud Chulanont during 2006–2007. From 2009 to 2011, he was on leave from the university and was appointed Deputy Secretary-General to the Prime Minister for Political Affairs while serving as acting government spokesman in the administration of Prime Minister Abhisit Vejjajiva. Between 2014 and 2019, he was appointed by the Thai Cabinet as adviser to the Deputy Prime Minister for Security, General Prawit Wongsuwan and helped draft Thailand's national strategy in the government of Prime Minister Prayut Chan-o-cha.

== Personal life ==
He was born in Betong district, Yala province, the southernmost region of Thailand, into a well-to-do family. His father was employed as a banker, while his mother worked as a teacher. His uncle, Sawat Wattanayagorn served as a Privy Councillor during the reign of King Bhumibol Adulyadej (Rama IX).

Panitan married at the age of 55 to a former student of his at Chulalongkorn University. He stated that he did not recall her during her studies, but the two later became acquainted when she was serving as a civil servant under the Bureau of the Royal Household (now part of the Royal Secretariat Bureau). The couple subsequently had two sons, and as of 2025, their younger son was eight years old.

Throughout much of his life, he did not own a private residence or personal vehicle, residing instead in university dormitories. It was only after his marriage that he acquired a home for his family.
