= Jatuporn Prompan =

Thai politician and activist (born 1965)

- จตุพร พรหมพันธุ์
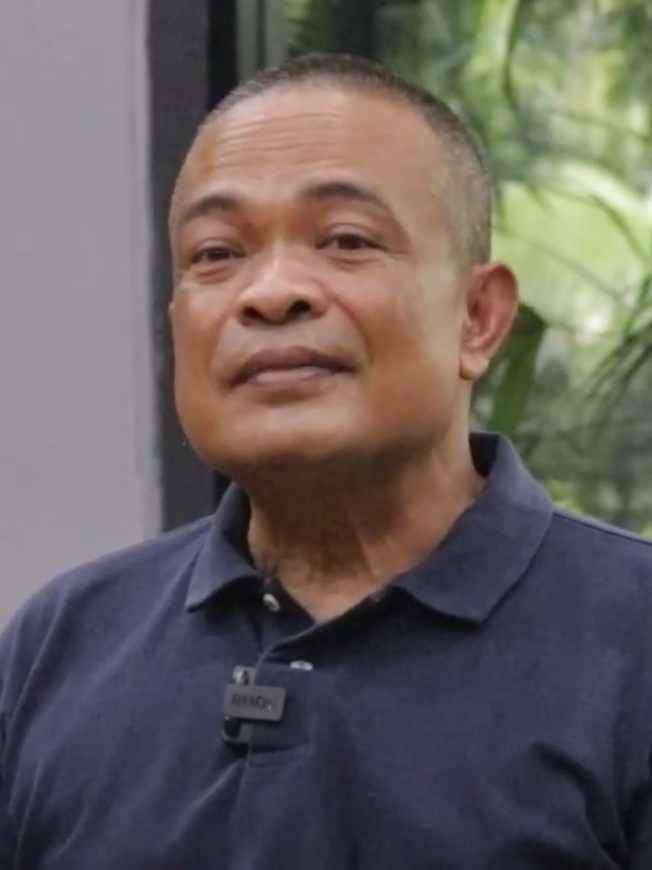
- Jatuporn in November 2023

Member of the House of Representatives for Party List
- In office 3 July 2011 – 18 May 2012 (Proportional); 23 December 2007 - 10 May 2011

Personal details
- Born: Jatuporn Prompan; October 5, 1965 (age 60) Ban Na San, Surat Thani, Thailand
- Party: Pheu Thai Party
- Education: Ramkhamhaeng University
- Occupation: Political Activist
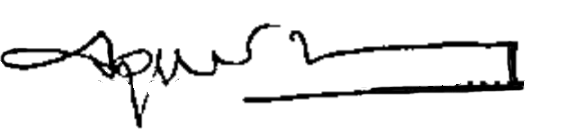
- Signature

Jatuporn Prompan (Thai: จตุพร พรหมพันธุ์; RTGS: Chatuphon Phromphan; Thai pronunciation: [t͡ɕàʔtùʔpʰɔːn pʰrompʰan]; born October 5, 1965) is a Thai politician and activist. He is one of the core leaders of the National United Front of Democracy Against Dictatorship (UDD), also known as the "Red Shirts", and a former Member of Parliament of the Pheu Thai Party. In July 2017, he was given a one-year prison sentence for defamation.

== Early life and education ==
Jatuporn was born in Amphoe Ban Na San, Surat Thani Province to Chuan Prompan and his wife Nuam Buakaew. At age 8, Jatuporn went to live with his older brother in Nakhon Si Thammarat. Following his father's death in 1977, he stayed at Bangkok's Wat Bowonniwet temple, where his brother was then a Buddhist monk. He completed vocational school training in building construction, then volunteered to teach in a remote, mountainous area near Chiang Mai. He returned to Bangkok 3 years later and studied political science at open admission Ramkhamhaeng University, eventually graduating with a bachelor's degree. Jatuporn is married and has three daughters.

== Political activism ==
In the May 1992 pro-democracy uprising after government troops secured the area around Phan Fa Bridge and the Democracy Monument, Jatuporn joined protest leaders in demonstrations at Ramkhamhaeng University, eventually resulting in military-backed Prime Minister Suchinda Kraprayoon's resignation on 24 May 1992.

Jatuporn joined the Palang Dharma Party in 1996, but he defected to Thaksin Shinawatra's new Thai Rak Thai Party two years later. After the dissolution of the Thai Rak Thai Party for vote buying, he ran as a candidate of the People's Power Party in the 2007 parliamentary election. However, the Supreme Court ruled that the People's Power Party was simply a proxy for the already banned TRT. Jatuporn moved to the Pheu Thai Party and retained his seat as an MP and became one of the core leaders of the pro-Thaksin National United Front of Democracy Against Dictatorship (UDD), commonly known as the "Red Shirts".

Jatuporn led the Red-shirts in the massive 2010 Thai political protests that seized control of downtown Bangkok and culminated in violence in April and May. Jatuporn, Nattawut Saikua and other Red-Shirt leaders surrendered to police to prevent further bloodshed following the military crackdown on 19 May 2010.

Jatuporn, along with Nisit Sinthuprai, was jailed on terrorism charges for alleged involvement in the shooting of Army Major General "Seh Daeng" Khattiya Sawasdipol, after bail was denied on 12 May 2011.

Jatuporn, number 8 on the Pheu Thai party list candidates, was unable to vote in the general election on 3 July. This disqualified him from serving as a Member of Parliament. However, when the House of Representatives was convoked, the Election Commission (EC) ignored this and endorsed Jatuporn's status as a party list MP, and he was released on bail on 2 August 2011.

In November 2011, the Election Commission reconsidered its approval, forwarding the matter to the Constitutional Court. On 18 May 2012, the court ruled that Jatuporn was ineligible.

On 16 March 2014, he was named the leader of the Red Shirts, replacing Thida Thavornseth.

In July 2017, he was given a one-year prison sentence for defaming former Prime Minister Abhisit Vejjajiva. In 2010, Prompan had called Vejjajiva a murderer for using military force against civilians in a protest which resulted in the death of dozens of civilians.

After release from prison, he changed his attitude, becoming increasingly critical of Thaksin Shinawatra. On 25 May 2025, he announced that he was against Thaksin, joining forces with Sondhi Limthongkul and other allies.

== See also ==
- Truth Today

Party political offices
| Preceded by Thida Thavornseth | President of the United Front for Democracy Against Dictatorship; 2015–present | Incumbent |
