= Thai Pen Thai Party =

Thai Pen Thai Party พรรคไทยเป็นไท Free Thais Party
- Leader: Pongsuchin Weerakitpanit
- Secretary-General: Bun-udom Jaila
- Founded: 9 December 1998
- Dissolved: 30 March 2016
- Headquarters: Sukhothai

The Thai Pen Thai Party (Thai: พรรคไทยเป็นไท Phak Thai Pen Thai, translated as Thais Is Thai Party [sic] or Free Thais Party) is a political party in Thailand. Its original names were Phak Kaset Mahachon (พรรคเกษตรมหาชน) and then Phak Khon Kho Plot Ni (พรรคคนขอปลดหนี้) and then Phak Thai Pen Thai (พรรคไทเป็นไท with different spelling). At the last legislative elections, 6 February 2005, the party secured 0.6% of the popular vote and could not win any seat out of 500 seats.

The party was dissolved on 30 March 2016.
