= Thida Thavornseth =

Thai political activist

Thida Thavornseth (Thai: ธิดา ถาวรเศรษฐ, RTGS: Thida Thawonset, Thai pronunciation: [tʰídaː tʰǎːwɔːnsèːt]; born January 25, 1944) is a Thai assistant professor, microbiologist, pharmacist, and political activist. She is a retired university lecturer. Since 2010 she has been the chairperson of the United Front for Democracy Against Dictatorship (UDD), colloquially known as the "Red Shirts".

== Life and political activism ==
Thida Thavornseth was born in Surat Thani in Southern Thailand. She graduated from the Faculty of Pharmaceutical Sciences, Chulalongkorn University and is married to the physician Dr.Weng Tojirakarn, who shares her political activism. Thida participated in the pro-democracy uprising of October 1973, ending the military dictatorship, and the later leftist students protests in October 1976 that led to the Thammasat University massacre and a return to military rule. Both Thida and Weng then joined the illegal Communist Party of Thailand and fled to its camps in the jungle, hiding there for more than six years. In May 1992, she took part in the protests against the military-installed Prime Minister Suchinda Kraprayoon, which are now known as the Black May.

Once a critic of ousted prime minister Thaksin Shinawatra, she joined the UDD, a political pressure group close to Thaksin, campaigning against the influence of the military and "royalist circles" following the 2006 coup d'état, against perceived injustice, and for a fundamental change of power structures in the Thai society. After the fierce "Red Shirts" protests from March to May 2010, which ultimately led to the bloody military crackdowns in April and May and the arrests of the most important UDD leaders including her husband, Thida became chairwoman of the "United Front for Democracy Against Dictatorship" that December. Thida is considered a moderate, generally rejecting violence in favour of political action.

== Academic rank ==
- Assistant Professor
