= United Front for Democracy Against Dictatorship =

Pro-democracy political pressure group in Thailand

- Founded: 2006 (as the "Democratic Alliance Against Dictatorship" or DAAD)
- Type: Pressure group Political group
- Purpose: Dissolve the "aristocratic polity"
- Region served: Thailand
- Key people: Jatuporn Prompan; Veera Musikapong; Nattawut Saikua; Dr.Weng Tojirakarn; Kokaew Pikulthong; Thida Thavornseth

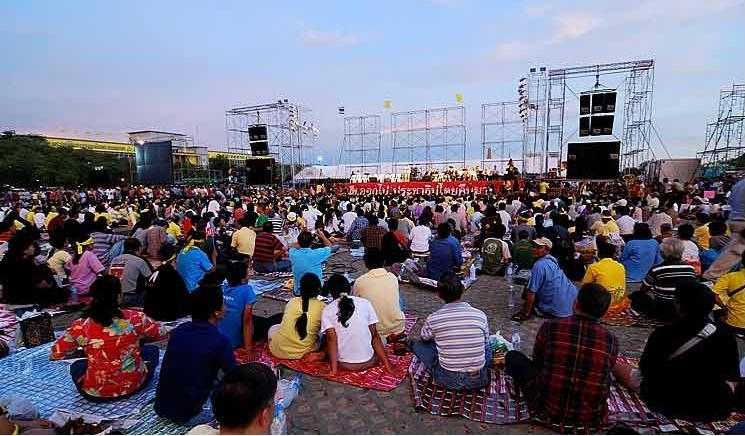
The UDD in 2007

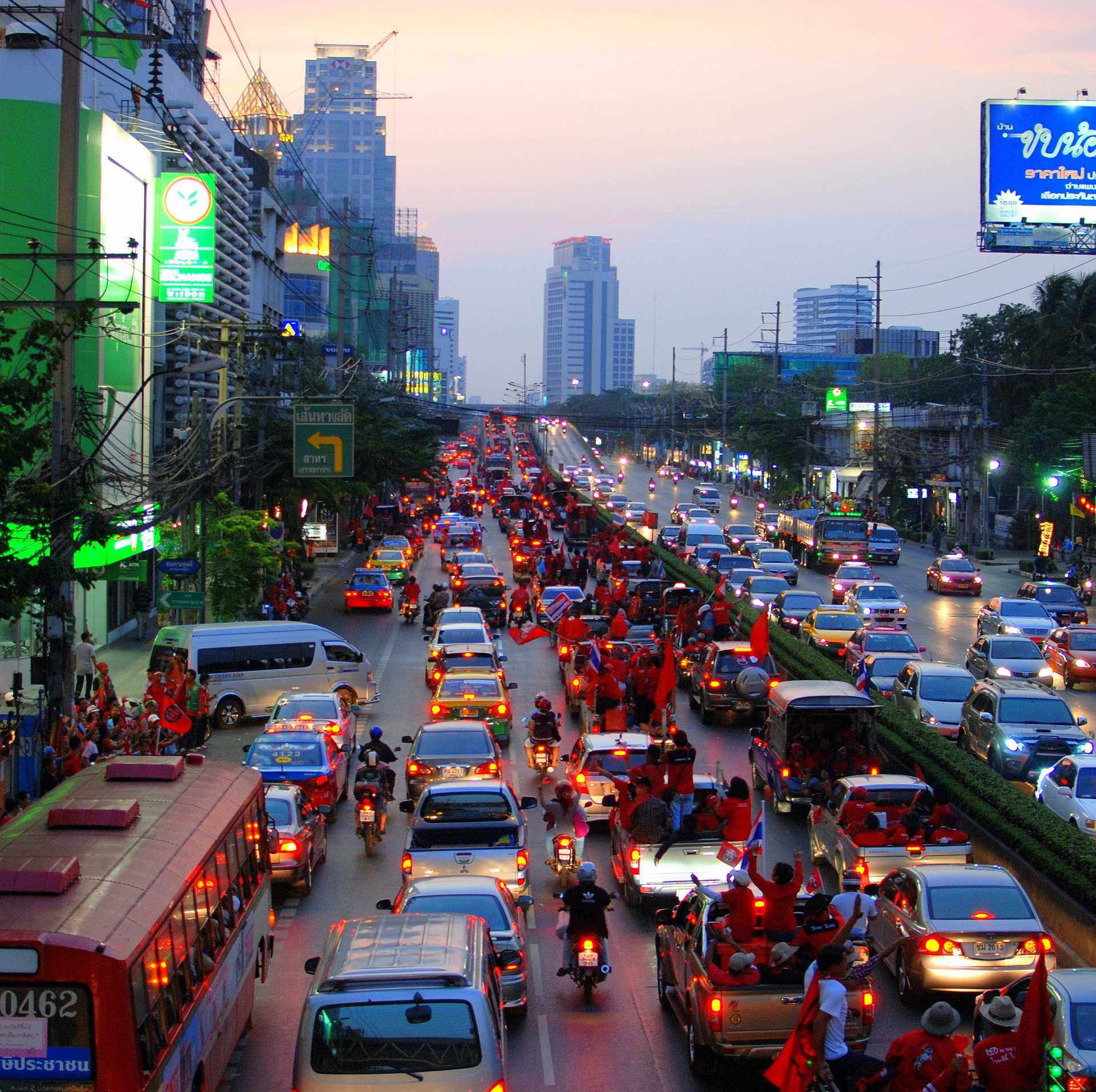
The demonstration of 20 March 2010, Rama 4 Road

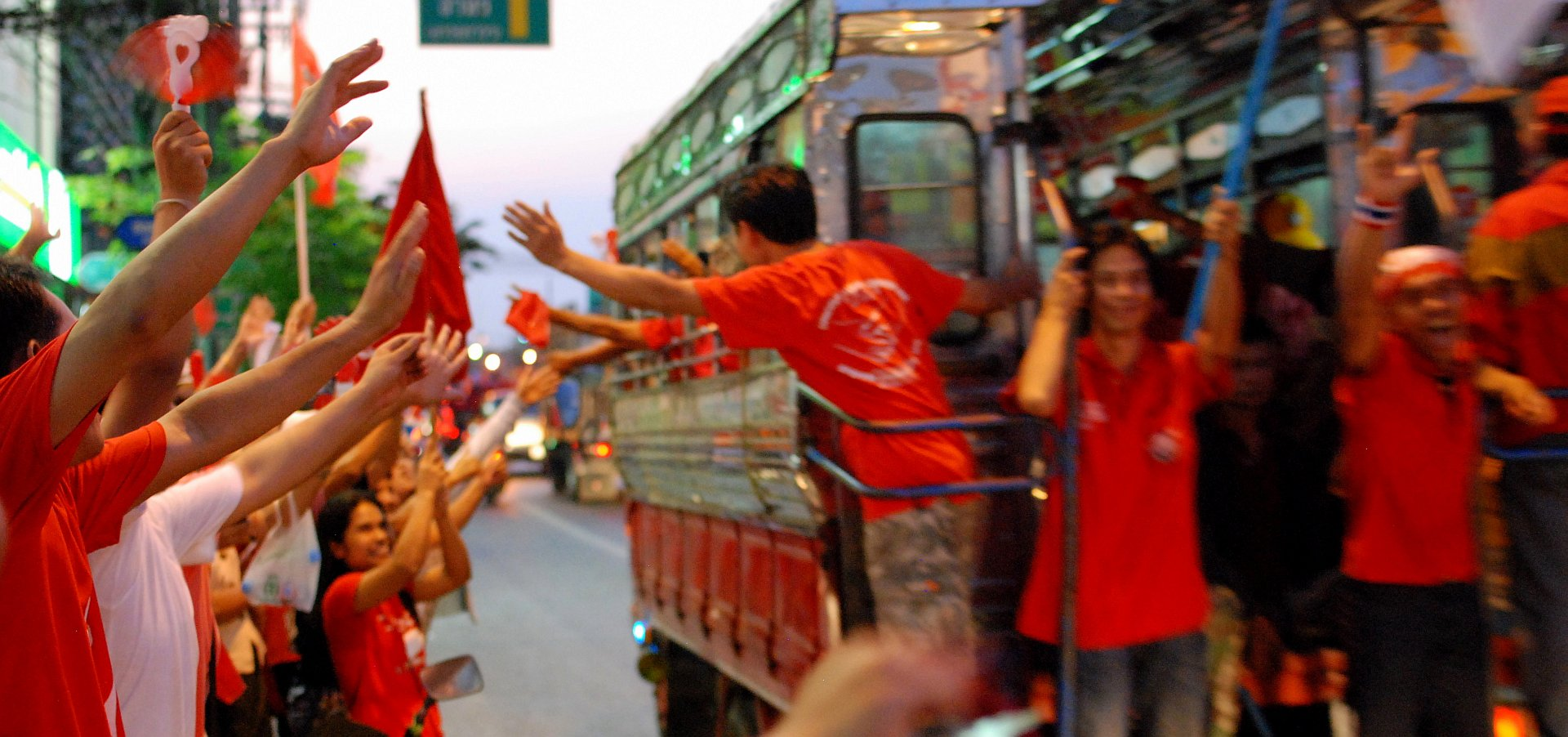
Supporters on Rama 4 Road, 20 March 2010

The United Front for Democracy Against Dictatorship (UDD; Thai: แนวร่วมประชาธิปไตยต่อต้านเผด็จการแห่งชาติ; นปช., alternatively translated as National Democratic Alliance against Dictatorship), whose supporters are commonly called Red Shirts, is a political pressure group opposed to the People's Alliance for Democracy (PAD), the 2006 Thai coup d'état, and supporters of the coup. Notable UDD leaders include Jatuporn Prompan, Nattawut Saikua, Veera Musikapong, Jaran Ditapichai, and Weng Tojirakarn. The UDD allies itself with the Pheu Thai Party, which was deposed by the 2014 military coup.

Before the July 2011 national elections, the UDD claimed that Abhisit Vejjajiva's government took power illegitimately, backed by the Thai Army and the judiciary. The UDD called for the Thai Parliament to be dissolved so that a general election could be held. UDD accused the country's extra-democratic elite—the military, judiciary, certain members of the privy council, and other unelected officials—of undermining democracy by interfering in politics. The UDD is composed of mostly rural citizens from northeast (Isan) and north Thailand, of urban lower classes from Bangkok, and of intellectuals. Although the movement seems to receive support from former prime minister-in-exile Thaksin Shinawatra, not all UDD members support the deposed prime minister.

== History ==
The UDD first formed in 2006 to oppose the military government and the military coup which overthrew former prime minister-in-exile, Thaksin Shinawatra, five weeks before scheduled elections. UDD organized anti-government rallies during the military government's rule in 2006–2007 and opposed the military's 2007 constitution. The UDD stopped protests after the 2007 general election, which the People's Power Party won. In response to violent anti-government PAD rallies and the yellow shirt seizure of Government House in May 2008, the UDD organized counter-demonstrations, which would sporadically result in injuries and deaths. After Prime Minister Abhisit Vejjajiva took office, the UDD led major anti-government rallies in April 2009 and March–May 2010, leading to violent clashes with military forces.

The UDD calls for the replacement of the Ammatayathipatai (อำมาตยาธิปไตย, aristocratic polity)—the system in which palace insiders, the military, and bureaucrats effectively ignore the popular mandate—with an electoral democracy. One of the UDD's favorite targets is Prem Tinsulanonda, the president of the privy council. Protests urge the immediate resignation of Prem from the privy council. Due to its insistence that palace insiders stop interfering in politics, the UDD has been criticized by the PAD as being an "anti-monarchist", and even a "republican" movement, and many websites and other media sympathetic to the UDD have been shut down under Thailand's strict lèse majesté laws. UDD leaders and supporters have been jailed under the same laws.

== UDD versus PAD, 2008 ==
UDD supporters have been anti-PAD since the 2006 coup, when they accused PAD of supporting the coup. From then on, clashes between supporters of the two groups have occurred from time to time, such as the clash in Udon Thani in July 2008. There, red-shirted UDD supporters attacked a PAD rally, injuring several PAD supporters. A PAD meeting in Chiang Mai, a bastion of Thaksin Shinawatra, was also disturbed.

Before daybreak on 2 September 2008, UDD supporters rallying at Sanamluang attacked PAD demonstrators gathering on the Makkhawan Rangsan Bridge at Ratchadamnoen Klang Avenue. The ensuing clash left several injured on both sides and one dead on the UDD side, causing a state of emergency in Bangkok. The military was called in to secure the situation, but not to disperse the demonstrators. The UDD was then seen by the public as the main adversary of the PAD, the red/yellow rivalry becoming evident.

== 2009 unrest ==
In March 2009, Thaksin Shinawatra claimed via a video broadcast to a UDD rally that Privy Council President Prem Tinsulanonda masterminded the 2006 military coup, and that Prem and fellow Privy Councillor members Surayud Chulanont and Chanchai Likhitjittha conspired with the military and other members of the "Ammatayathipatai" (อำมาตยาธิปไตย—aristocratic polity) to ensure that Abhisit became premier. Although Abhisit denied the accusations, thousands protested in Bangkok in early-April 2009, demanding that Abhisit resign from the premiership and that Prem, Surayud, and Chanchai resign from the privy council. Thaksin called for a "peoples revolution" to overcome the alleged aristocratic influences of the Abhisit government.

=== Pattaya ===
The UDD protests expanded to Pattaya, the site of the Fourth East Asia Summit. On 11 April 2009, violent clashes occurred between the UDD and blue-shirted government supporters brought in by coalition partner Newin Chidchob. The protests caused the summit to be cancelled, leading Abhisit to declare a state of emergency in the areas of Pattaya and Chonburi on 11 April after his vehicle was attacked and damaged by UDD demonstrators. The protest subsided on the afternoon of the same day. Legislation authorizing emergency decrees was originally pushed through parliament in 2005 by the Thaksin government, provoking charges of authoritarianism at the time by Abhisit. Under the state of emergency, gatherings of more than five persons were prohibited and the press was not permitted to present news which could incite worry.

=== Bangkok ===
As the week-long Songkran (Thai New Year) holiday began, protests escalated in Bangkok. On 8 April 2009, 100,000 UDD demonstrators rallied at Government House and nearby Royal Plaza in the evening. The government decided to declare a state of emergency in Bangkok and surrounding areas, and military forces were brought into the capital.

Fighting erupted between anti-government protesters, government supporters, and the general population. At a demonstration in front of Prem's residence, a yellow shirted driver plunged her car into a crowd of UDD protesters injuring several before driving away. She was not arrested. Abhisit denounced the UDD protesters as "national enemies". Abhisit issued a red shirt decree that empowered the government to censor television broadcasts.

In the pre-dawn of Monday, 13 April, soldiers used tear gas and fired live and training rounds to clear protesters from the Din Daeng intersection near the Victory Monument in central Bangkok, injuring at least 70 people. The army later claimed that live rounds were only fired into the air while training rounds were fired at the crowd. However, Human Rights Watch confirmed that there were some cases where the army fired live ammunition directly at protesters. The UDD claimed that dozens of protesters died from gunshot wounds sustained during the military's attack. The army claimed that the wounds were not caused by M-16s, the standard army rifle. Also on Monday the government ordered the blocking of satellite news station D Station, an affiliate of the UDD which, at the time, was broadcasting the clashes. Several community radio stations were shut down and searched upon suspicion of supporting the UDD.

On 21 April, Abhisit declared a "media war" designed to attack the UDD. He also announced the public distribution of millions of VCDs documenting the government's views on the unrest. At the time, the government's emergency and censorship decrees were still in place. The state of emergency, but not the censorship decree, was lifted on 24 April.

Soon afterwards, Abhisit revoked Thaksin's ordinary passport (Abhisit had revoked Thaksin's diplomatic passport shortly after taking office) and issued arrest warrants for dozens of other protest leaders.

According to government figures, over 120 people were injured in the unrest, most of them UDD demonstrators. At least one UDD red shirt protester injured from gunshot wounds sustained during the military's attack in Din Daeng, although the army claimed the wound was not caused by their standard firearm. The UDD claimed that at least six demonstrators were killed in the unrest and their bodies hauled away by the military, although the army rejected the claim. The dead bodies of two UDD protesters were found floating in the Chao Phraya River, their hands tied behind their backs and their bodies badly beaten, although police had yet to conclude if their murders were politically motivated. Abhisit aide Satit Wongnontaey claimed that red-shirted protesters shot a person dead and injured two others when residents of the Nang Lerng Market came out to criticise the protesters. No arrests were made and there was a lack of evidence to back his claims. The Bangkok Metropolitan Administration estimated that it had incurred 10 million baht (approximately US$300,000) in property damage, including 31 damaged and burned buses. The Federation of the Thai Tourism Industry estimated that the damage to the tourism industry could be as high as 200 billion baht (US$6 billion), resulting in 257,000 jobs lost.

Prior to a gathering of the red shirts planned for 30 August 2009, the prime minister approved the establishment of the Center for the Administration of Peace and Order (CAPO) (ศูนย์อำนวยการแก้ไขสถานการณ์ฉุกเฉิน (ศอฉ.) CAPO) to draw up plans and measures to prevent and end any violent incidents that might be planned by ill-intentioned groups.

== 2010 protests ==
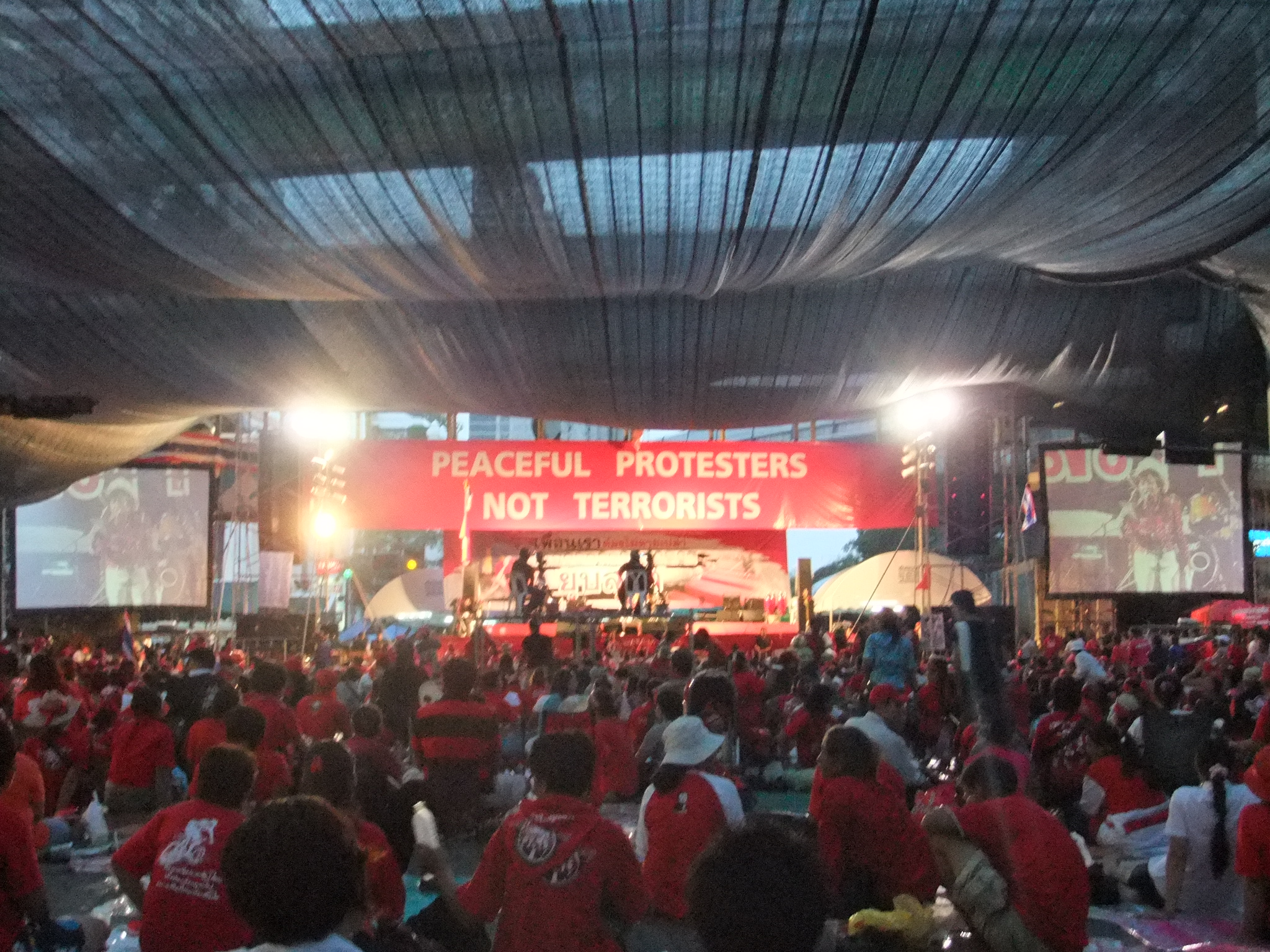
UDD assembly, Chit Lom Station, Bangkok.

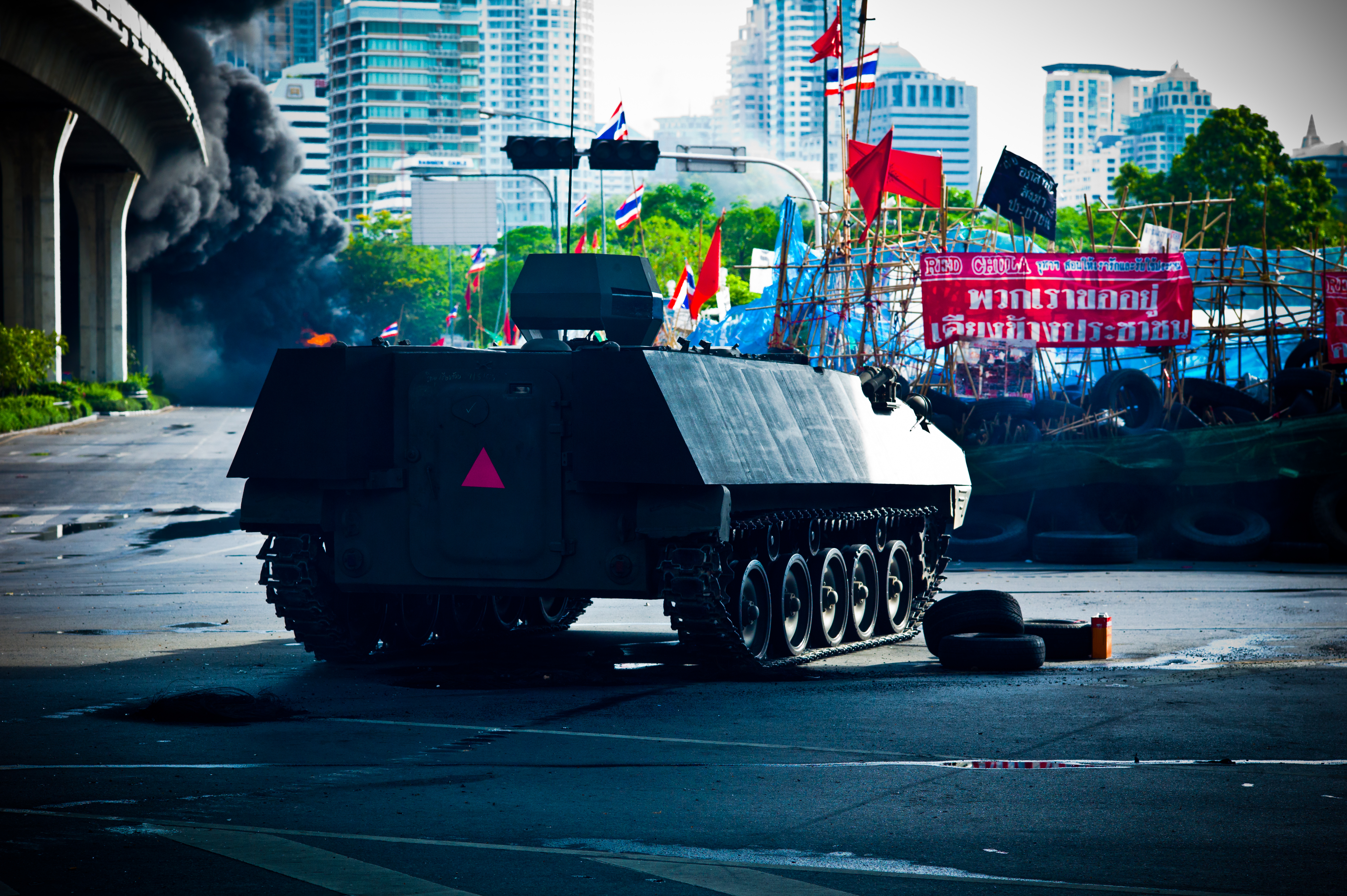
Thai Type 85 APCs during 2010 Thai political protests

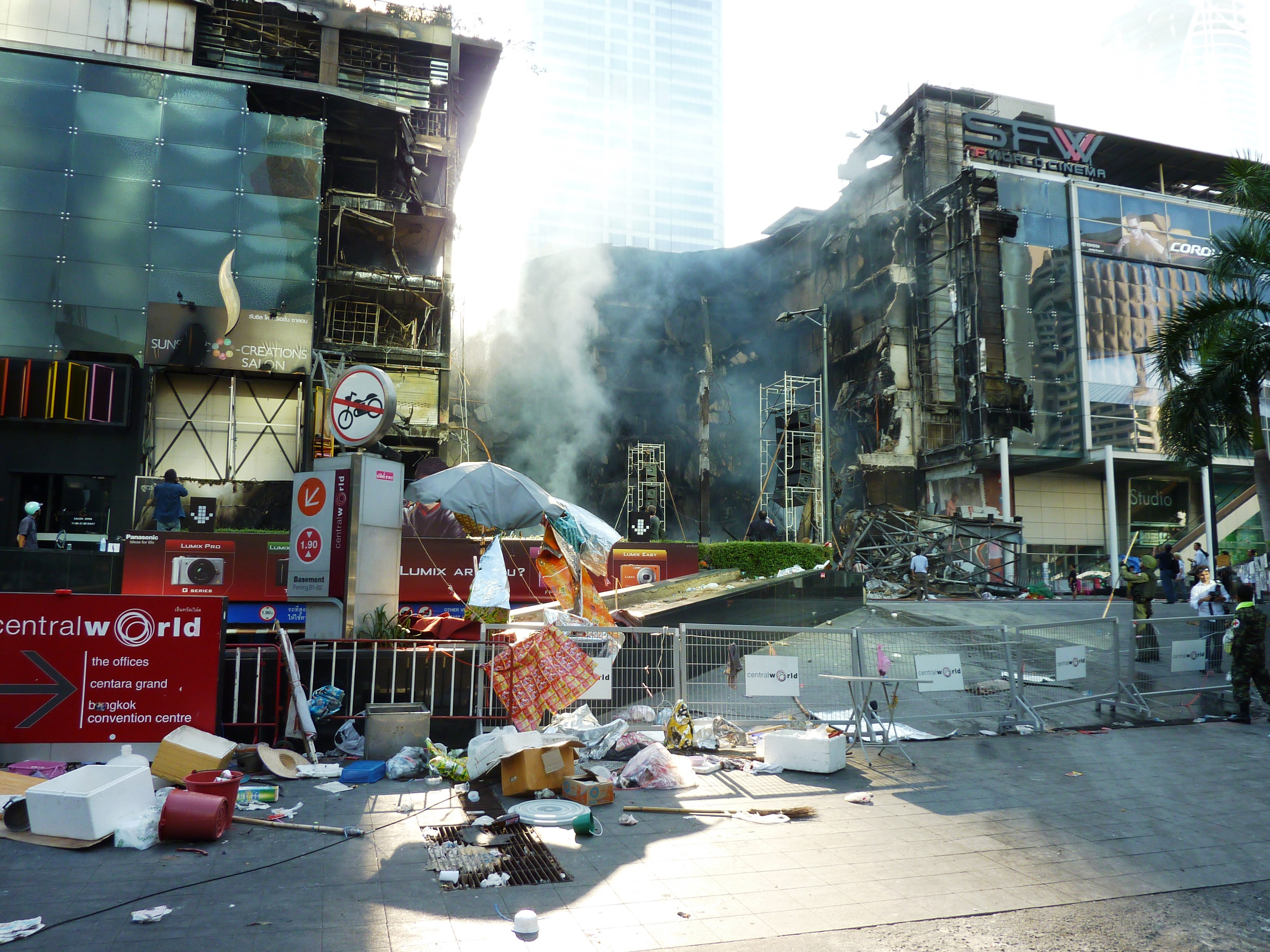
CentralWorld after the fire on 19 May 2010

Abhisit's government expected UDD-led unrest immediately following the announcement of the supreme court's verdict on Thaksin Shinawatra's asset seizure case, despite UDD's announcement that it would not protest the verdict. Protest suppression measures were enacted, and security was increased throughout the nation. Despite the government's warnings, the UDD did not protest the verdict, but instead announced that they would hold a large-scale protest in Bangkok on 14 March calling for elections.

Abhisit increased security measures to suppress 14 March protests. In the days prior to the protest, checkpoints were set up to inspect protester caravans entering Bangkok, especially those coming from UDD strongholds in the north and northeast, with orders to detain any protesters with weapons. A government/military situation room for monitoring the protest, officially called the Peacekeeping Operations Command, was established at the 11th Infantry Regiment in Bang Khen. Pro-government elements in the northeast issued threats to deter people from leaving for the capital.

Abhisit claimed to have received intelligence that there was a terrorist threat of sabotage taking place on 14 March. The UDD denied Abhisit's allegations and dared him to reveal any evidence backing his claims. Suthep claimed that the UDD protesters planned to "besiege government offices and residences of important figures, like Privy Council President Prem Tinsulanonda."

On 9 March, Abhisit imposed the Internal Security Act from 11 to 23 March. A 50,000-strong security force was deployed in Bangkok.

On Friday, 12 March, police and military checkpoints were set up along all main routes leading to Bangkok to inspect UDD protesters for weapons being carried into the capital. The police issued a warning that bus operators transporting people to Bangkok without official permission could have their concessions revoked. Five bombs exploded in Surat Thani, a Democrat Party stronghold, in the early morning of 12 March. Nobody was injured or killed. It was not clear who was behind the bombings. No arrests were made.

The protests on Sunday, 14 March were the largest in Thai history, and were peaceful. However, Thailand's free-to-air TV channels, all controlled by the government or military, claimed that there were only 25,000 protesters at the main protest site, Phan Fah Bridge. On Tuesday, UDD protesters announced that they would be collecting 10 milliliters of blood from volunteer protesters and pouring the blood in a symbolic sacrifice at Government House and other sites in Bangkok. These public blood rituals were a highly effective publicity stunt and drew widespread attention to the protests. However, critics have said that the UDD's association with blood tarnished the movement's efforts to keep its campaign "clean" and may have discouraged potential supporters, in addition to the associated cost and the health risk for cleanup crew due to HIV and hepatitis-infected blood being part of the ceremony.

Negotiations between the protesters and the government failed to result in a resolution of the situation (these negotiations took place into May 2012). Even though the demonstrators conditions were met, an alleged last minute phone call from Thaksin said no to making an agreement. On 27 March, protesters marched to seven locations in Bangkok where troops had been stationed in preparation for a crackdown and convinced them to withdraw. There were dozens of bombings in Bangkok during the weeks of the protest, with nobody claiming responsibility and no arrests made. A Porsche was rammed into protester motorcycles at Rajprasong intersection, injuring several. In a separate incident, a woman rammed her car into a crowd of protesters, but drove away before she could be arrested.

Abhisit declared a state of emergency on the evening of 8 April. Troops barricaded the uplink station for the Thaicom satellite to prevent it from airing People Channel, a popular TV station sympathetic to the UDD. Protesters surrounded the station in the afternoon of 9 April. Tear gas was fired into the crowd, prompting the protesters to storm the station. The troops withdrew to avoid bloodshed as the protesters stole over 20 M-16 rifles from the armoury of the stationed units.

On 10 April, the protests turned violent when government troops approached the red shirt encampment and fired live ammunition at some protesters. Twenty-five people were killed in the confrontation, with more than 800 people injured. Tensions continued to grow, as pro-government rallies started to appear alongside anti-government rallies. On 22 April, a series of explosions in Bangkok killed at least one person and injured more than 85 others, including four foreigners. At least some of the explosions were caused by grenades, which the government claimed were fired from the Red Shirt encampment. On 28 April, Thai security forces and anti-government protesters clashed on the outskirts of Bangkok, with troops firing both over and then directly into a crowd of red shirts to keep them from expanding their demonstrations. At least 16 protesters were wounded and one soldier was killed. The soldier was found to have been shot in the back by another soldier in a case of friendly fire.

Jatuporn Prompan, Nattawut Saikua and other Red Shirt leaders surrendered to police, according to them, to prevent further bloodshed during the military crackdown on 19 May 2010. In the aftermath of this attack, 27 buildings were set ablaze in Bangkok. The Thai military largely removed the protesters there, but pockets of resistance still remained as of Thursday 20 May.

== 2011 ==
CAPO (Center for the Administration of Peace and Order), first established in August 2009, was re-established after the cabinet approved the imposition of Chapter 2 of the Internal Security Act (ISA) in seven districts of Bangkok from 9–23 February to control the rallies by the yellow shirt People's Alliance for Democracy (PAD) and the red shirt United Front for Democracy against Dictatorship (UDD), to which local reaction to the Cambodian–Thai border dispute forms a background.

== 2012 ==
PAD (yellow shirt) leaders Sondhi Limthongkul, Chamlong Srimuang, and others were indicted on 27 December for storming the prime minister's office compound and sealing off parliament during the massive anti-government rallies in 2008.
