= Veera Musikapong =

Thai politician (born 1948)

Veerakarn Musikapong
- วีระกานต์ มุสิกพงศ์
- Born: Veera Musikapong Thai: วีระ มุสิกพงศ์ 24 May 1948 (age 78); Songkhla, Thailand
- Occupations: Politician; activist
- Political party: Thai Rak Thai Party
- Spouse: Srivilai Prasutanon

Military service
- Allegiance: Thailand
- Branch/service: Volunteer Defense Corps
- Rank: VDC Col

Veerakarn Musikapong (Thai: วีระกานต์ มุสิกพงศ์, RTGS: Wirakan Musikaphong), born Veera Musikapong (Thai: วีระ มุสิกพงศ์) on 24 May 1948 in Ranot, Songkhla Province, is a Thai politician. Veera was government spokesman of Prime Minister Seni Pramoj, Deputy Minister of Agriculture, of Communications, and of Interior in the governments of Prem Tinsulanonda, secretary general of the Democrat Party, executive member of the Thai Rak Thai Party and longstanding Member of Parliament. Since 2006, he has been one of the leaders of the United Front for Democracy Against Dictatorship or Red Shirts.

In 1987, while serving as secretary general of the Democrat Party, he emerged as a leading figure of a group known as the "January 10 Group." The group consisted of 40 Democrat MPs who supported Chalermphan Srivikorn, a former secretary general of the party, in his bid to replace the incumbent party leader, Bhichai Rattakul. The group was dissatisfied with various aspects of Bhichai's management of the party. Its challenge created considerable internal turmoil within the Democrat Party and contributed to the political pressure that eventually led Prime Minister General Prem Tinsulanonda to dissolve Parliament and call a new election. Following the dissolution, members of the group left the Democrat Party and joined various other political parties. Veera later founded the Damrong Thai Party and contested the 1995 general election, but the party was unsuccessful.
